= Ani-Maeda Onsen Station =

Railway station in Kitaakita, Akita Prefecture, Japan

Ani-Maeda-Onsen Station 阿仁前田温泉駅
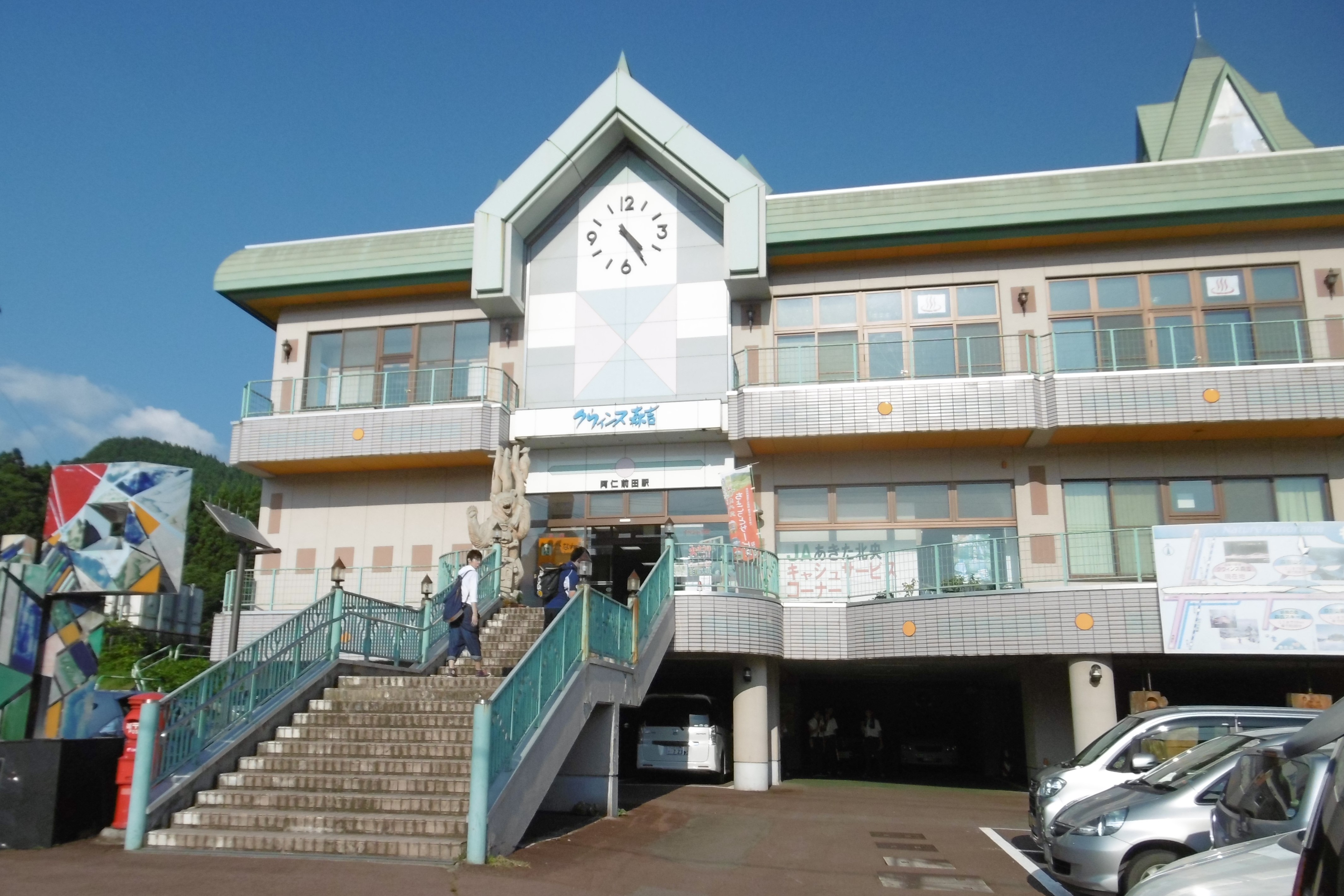
- Ani-Maeda-Onsen Station, 2016

General information
- Location: Donoshita Komata, Kitaakita-shi, Akita-ken 018-4513; Japan
- Coordinates: 40°03′40.74″N 140°25′4.00″E
- Operator: Akita Nariku Railway
- Line: ■ Nairiku Line
- Distance: 25.2 kilometers from Takanosu
- Platforms: 2 side platforms

Other information
- Status: Staffed
- Website: Official website

History
- Opened: November 15, 1935
- Former names: Ani-Maeda (until 2021)

Passengers
- FY2016: 59
Location
- Location within Akita Prefecture Location within Japan

Ani-Maeda Onsen Station (阿仁前田温泉駅, Ani-Maeda-Onsen-eki) is a railway station located in the city of Kitaakita, Akita Prefecture, Japan, operated by the third sector railway operator Akita Nairiku Jūkan Railway.

== Lines ==
Ani-Maeda Onsen Station is served by the Nariku Line, and is located 25.2 km (15.7 mi) from the terminus of the line at Takanosu Station.

== Station layout ==
The station consists of two side platforms serving two tracks, connected to the station building by a level crossing. The three-story station building also incorporates a hot spring spa. The station is staffed.

=== Platforms ===
1	■ Akita Nairiku Jūkan Railway Akita Nairiku Line	for Takanosu
2	■ Akita Nairiku Jūkan Railway Akita Nairiku Line	for Kakunodate

== Adjacent stations ==
«	Service	»
Akita Nairiku Jūkan Railway Akita Nairiku Line
Yonaizawa	Express Moriyoshi	Aniai
Katsurase	-	Maeda-Minami

== History ==
Ani-Maeda Station opened on 15 November 1935, as a station on the Japanese Government Railways serving the village of Maeda, Akita. The line was extended on to Aniai Station by 25 September 1936. The line was privatized on 1 November 1986, becoming the Akita Nairiku Jūkan Railway.

The station was renamed Ani-Maeda Onsen Station on 13 March 2021.

== Surrounding area ==
- National Route 105
