= Katsurase Station =

Railway station in Kitaakita, Akita Prefecture, Japan

Katsurae Station 桂瀬駅
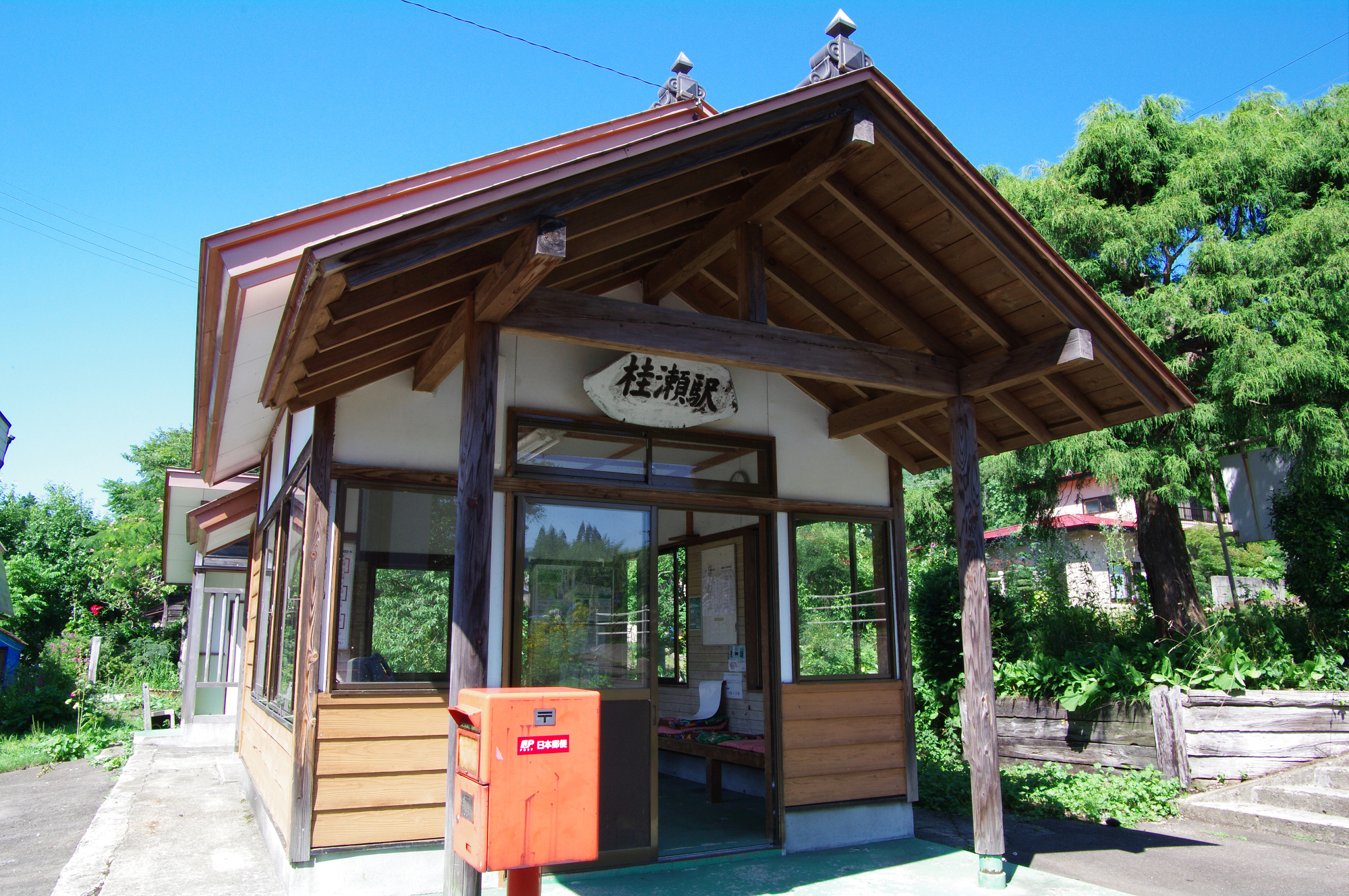
- Katsurase Station, October 2012

General information
- Location: Katsurae, Kitaakita-shi, Akita-ken; Japan
- Coordinates: 40°06′5.36″N 140°25′4.44″E
- Operator: Akita Nariku Railway
- Line: ■ Nairiku Line
- Distance: 20.5 kilometers from Takanosu
- Platforms: 1 side platform

Other information
- Status: Unstaffed
- Website: Official website

History
- Opened: November 15, 1935

Passengers
- FY2016: 16
Location
- Location within Akita Prefecture Location within Japan

Katsurase Station (桂瀬駅, Katsurase-eki) is a railway station located in the city of Kitaakita, Akita Prefecture, Japan, operated by the third sector railway operator Akita Nairiku Jūkan Railway.

== Lines ==
Katsurae Station is served by the Nariku Line, and is located 20.5 km from the terminus of the line at Takanosu Station.

== Station layout ==
The station consists of one side platform serving a single bi-directional track. The station is unattended.

== Adjacent stations ==
«	Service	»
Akita Nairiku Jūkan Railway Akita Nairiku Line
Rapid: Does not stop at this station
Yonaizawa	-	Ani-Maeda Onsen

== History ==
Katsurae Station opened on 15 November 1935 as a station on the Japan National Railways (JNR) serving the village of Maeda, Akita. The line was extended on to Aniai Station by 25 September 1936. The line was privatized on 1 November 1986, becoming the Akita Nairiku Jūkan Railway.

== Surrounding area ==
- National Route 105
- Ani River
- Moriyoshi Junior High School
