= Ōnodai Station =

Railway station in Kitaakita, Akita Prefecture, Japan

Ōnodai Station 大野台駅
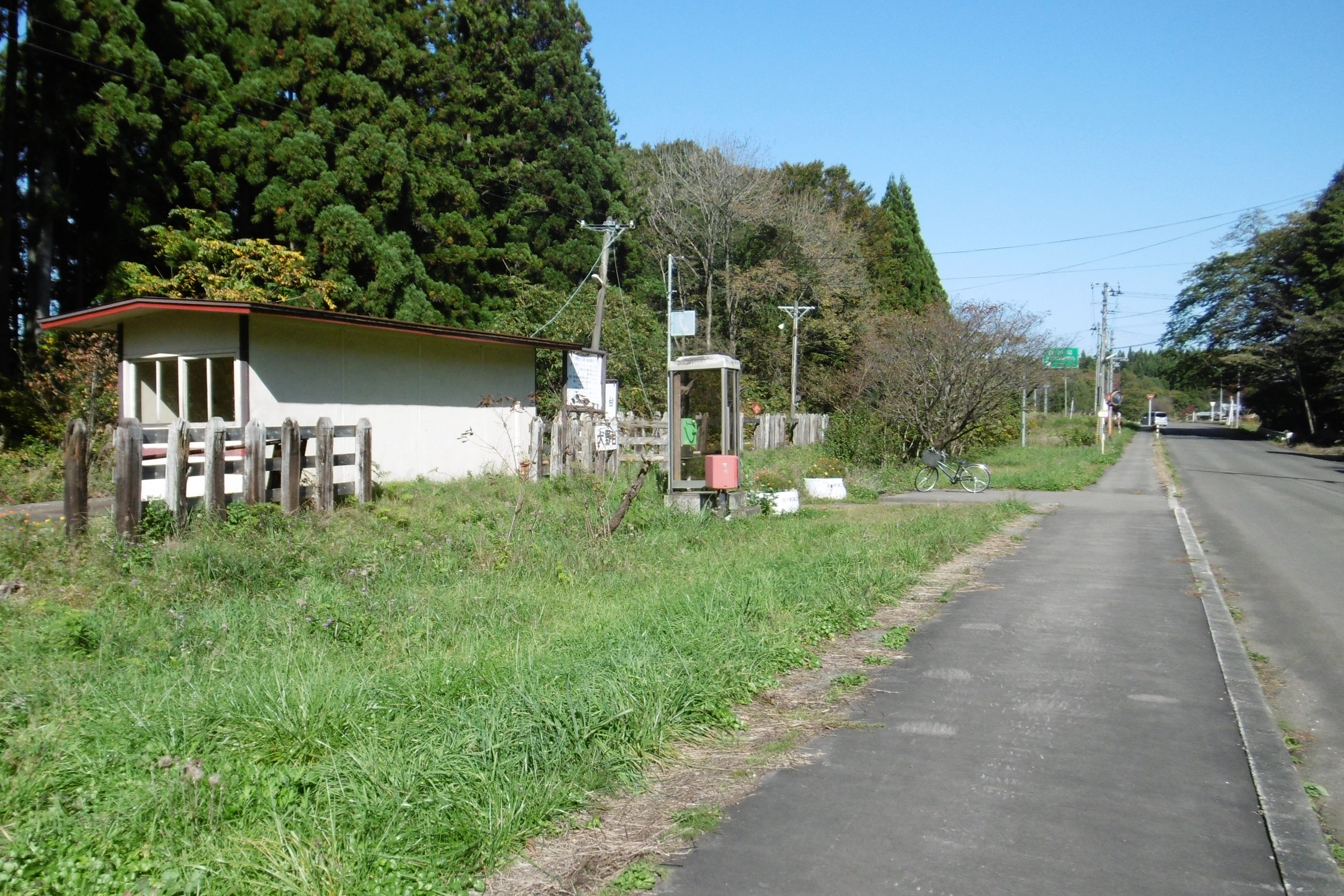
- Ōnodai Station, October 2016

General information
- Location: Kanezawa Kamisugi, Kitaakita-shi, Akita-ken 018-4231; Japan
- Coordinates: 40°11′13.16″N 140°20′26.77″E
- Operator: Akita Nariku Railway
- Line: ■ Nairiku Line
- Distance: 6.1 kilometers from Takanosu
- Platforms: 1 side platform

Other information
- Status: Unstaffed
- Website: Official website

History
- Opened: April 20, 1965

Passengers
- FY2016: 7
Location
- Location within Akita Prefecture Location within Japan

Ōnodai Station (大野台駅, Ōnodai-eki) is a railway station located in the city of Kitaakita, Akita Prefecture, Japan, operated by the third sector railway operator Akita Nairiku Jūkan Railway.

== Lines ==
Ōnodai Station is served by the Nariku Line, and is located 6.1 km from the terminus of the line at Takanosu Station.

== Station layout ==
The station consists of one side platform serving a single bi-directional track. The station is unattended.

== Adjacent stations ==
«	Service	»
Akita Nairiku Jūkan Railway Akita Nairiku Line
Rapid: Does not stop at this station
Jōmon-Ogata	-	Aikawa

== History ==
Ōnodai Station opened on April 20, 1965 as a station on the Japan National Railways (JNR) serving the town of Aikawa, Akita. The line was privatized on 1 November 1986, becoming the Akita Nairiku Jūkan Railway.

== Surrounding area ==
- National Route 105
- Ani River
