= Okashinai Station =

Railway station in Kitaakita, Akita Prefecture, Japan

Okashinai Station 笑内駅
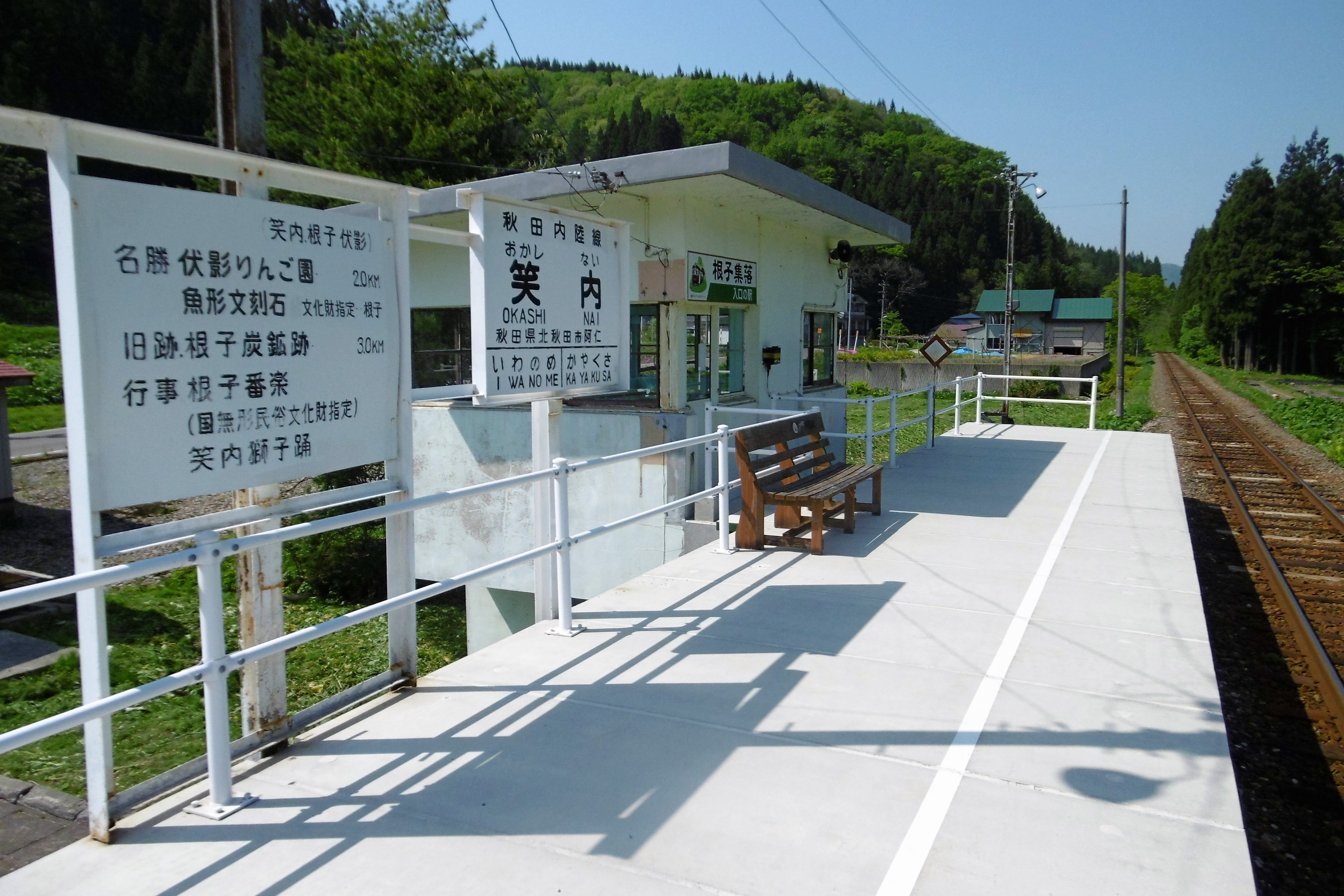
- Okashinai Station, May 2017

General information
- Location: Okashinai Aniokashinai, Kitaakita-shi, Akita-ken 018-4743; Japan
- Coordinates: 39°56′6.50″N 140°24′47.08″E
- Operator: Akita Nariku Railway
- Line: ■ Nairiku Line
- Distance: 40.9 kilometers from Takanosu
- Platforms: 1 side platform

Other information
- Status: Unstaffed
- Website: Official website

History
- Opened: October 15, 1963
Location
- Location within Akita Prefecture Location within Japan

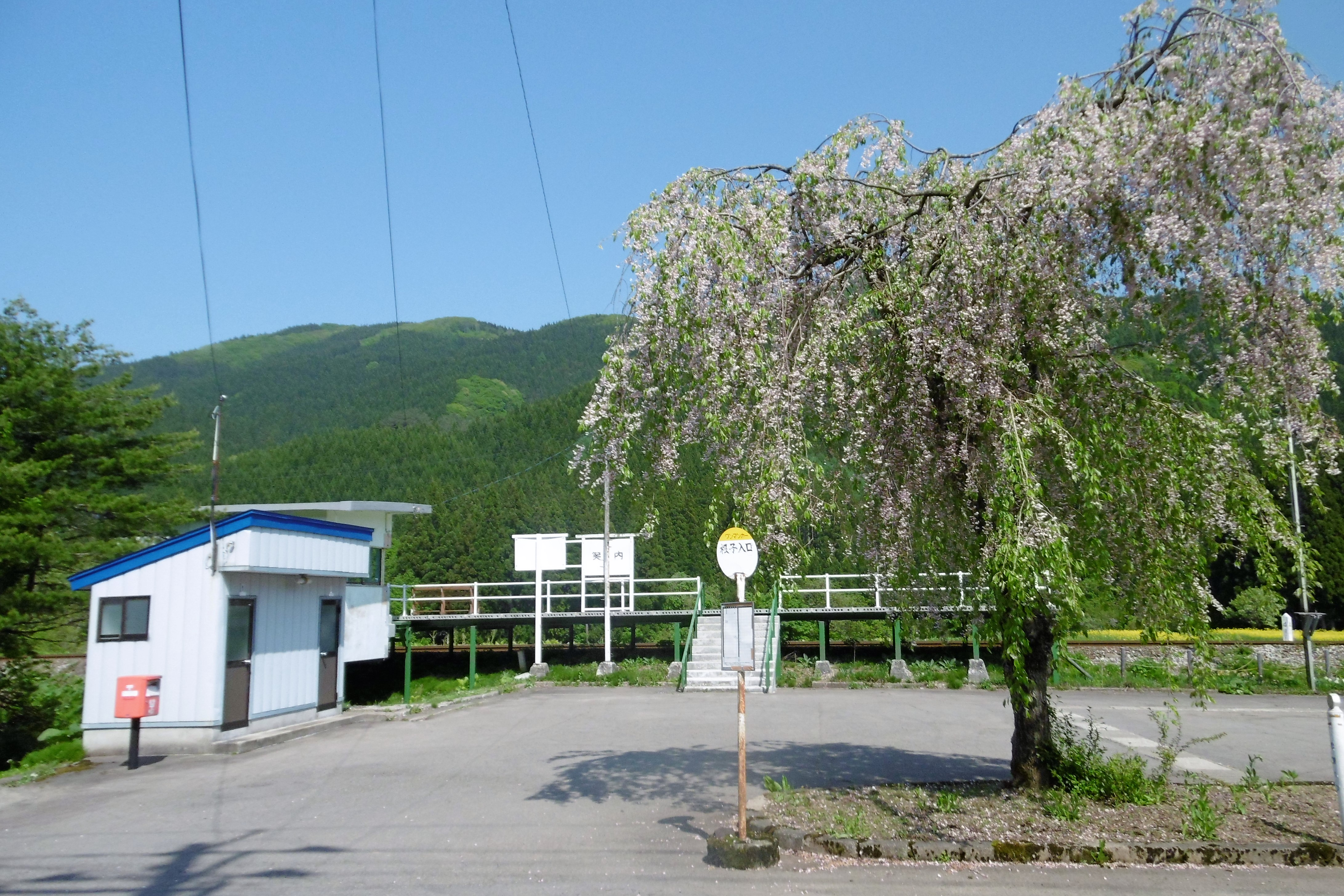
Station building

Okashinai Station (笑内駅, Okashinai-eki) is a railway station located in the city of Kitaakita, Akita Prefecture, Japan, operated by the third sector railway operator Akita Nairiku Jūkan Railway.

== Lines ==
Okashinai Station is served by the Nariku Line, and is located 40.9 km from the terminus of the line at Takanosu Station.

== Station layout ==
The station consists of one side platform serving a single bi-directional track. The station is unattended.

== Adjacent stations ==
«	Service	»
Akita Nairiku Jūkan Railway Akita Nairiku Line
Rapid: Does not stop at this station
Kayakusa	-	Iwanome

== History ==
Okashinai Station opened on 15 October 1963 as a station on the Japan National Railways (JNR) serving the town of Ani, Akita. The line was privatized on 1 November 1986, becoming the Akita Nairiku Jūkan Railway.

== Surrounding area ==
- National Route 105
