= Yonaizawa Station =

Railway station in Kitaakita, Akita Prefecture, Japan

Yonaizawa Station 米内沢駅
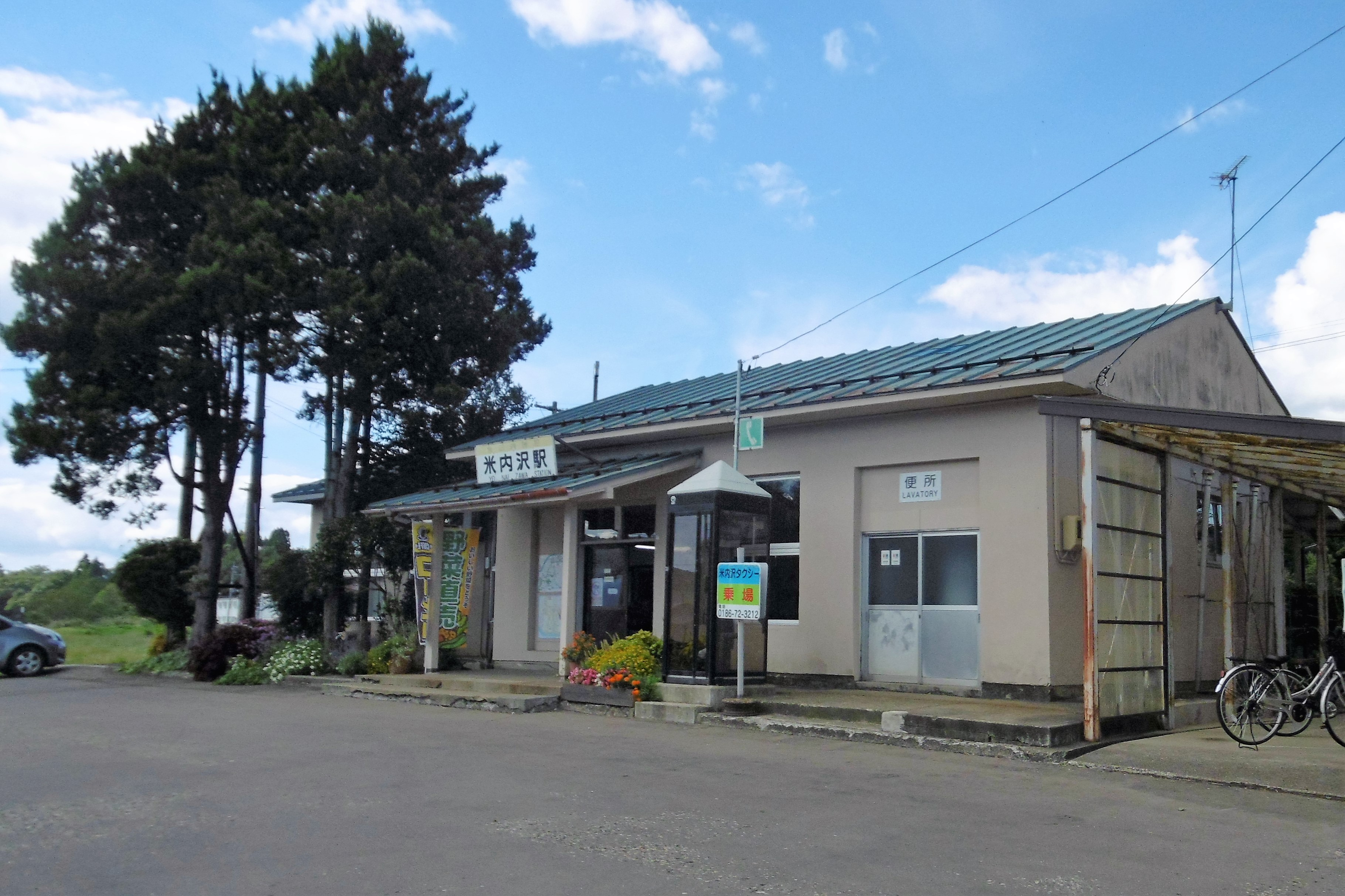
- Yonaizawa Station, October 2016

General information
- Location: Uwano Yonaizawa, Kitaakita-shi, Akita-ken 018-4301; Japan
- Coordinates: 40°07′41.61″N 140°22′24.48″E
- Operator: Akita Nariku Railway
- Line: ■ Nairiku Line
- Distance: 15.0 kilometers from Takanosu
- Platforms: 1 side platform

Other information
- Status: Unstaffed
- Website: Official website

History
- Opened: December 10, 1934

Passengers
- FY2016: 76
Location
- Location within Akita Prefecture Location within Japan

Yonzaizawa Station (米内沢駅, Yonaizawa-eki) is a railway station located in the city of Kitaakita, Akita Prefecture, Japan, operated by the third sector railway operator Akita Nairiku Jūkan Railway.

== Lines ==
Yonaizawa Station is served by the Nariku Line, and is located 15.0 km from the terminus of the line at Takanosu Station.

== Station layout ==
The station consists of one side platform serving a single bi-directional track. The station is unattended.

== Adjacent stations ==
«	Service	»
Akita Nairiku Jūkan Railway Akita Nairiku Line
Rapid: Does not stop at this station
Kamisugi	-	Katsurase

== History ==
Yonaizawa Station opened on 10 December 1934 as a station on the Japan National Railways (JNR) serving the village of Maeda, Akita. The line was extended on to Aniai Station by 25 September 1936. The line was privatized on 1 November 1986, becoming the Akita Nairiku Jūkan Railway.

== Surrounding area ==
- National Route 105
- National Route 285
- former Moriyoshi Town Hall
- Ani River
