= Iwanome Station =

Railway station in Kitaakita, Akita Prefecture, Japan

Iwanome Station 岩野目駅
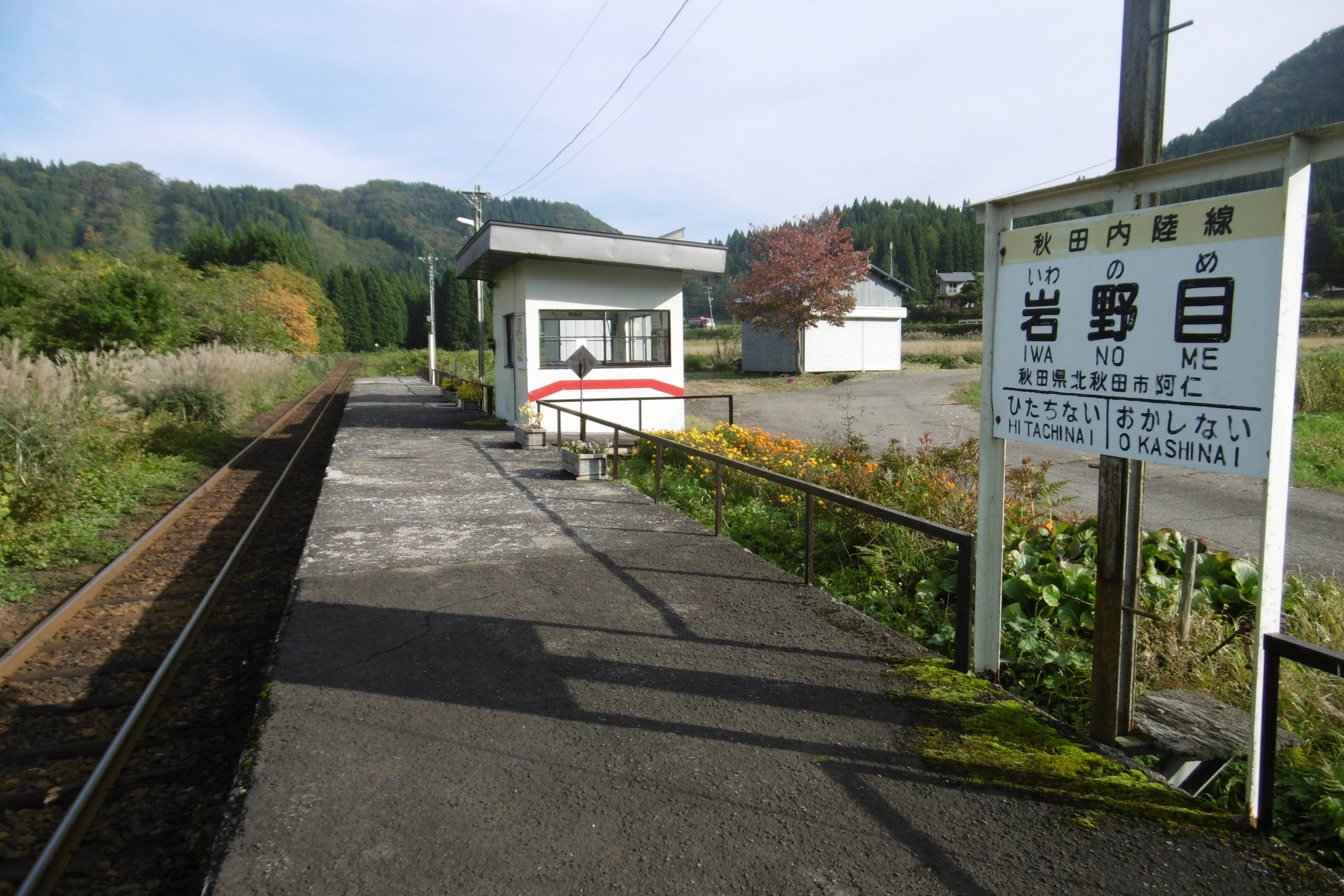
- Iwanome Station, October 2016

General information
- Location: Ani-Koyawatari Iwanome, Kitaakita-shi, Akita-ken; Japan
- Coordinates: 39°55′16.38″N 140°25′50.47″E
- Operator: Akita Nariku Railway
- Line: ■ Nairiku Line
- Distance: 43.4 kilometers from Takanosu
- Platforms: 1 side platform

Other information
- Status: Unstaffed
- Website: Official website

History
- Opened: October 15, 1963
Location
- Location within Akita Prefecture Location within Japan

Iwanome Station (岩野目駅, Iwanome-eki) is a railway station located in the city of Kitaakita, Akita Prefecture, Japan, operated by the third sector railway operator Akita Nairiku Jūkan Railway.

== Lines ==
Iwanome Station is served by the Nariku Line, and is located 43.3 km from the terminus of the line at Takanosu Station.

== Station layout ==
The station consists of one side platform serving a single bi-directional track. The station is unattended.

== Adjacent stations ==
| « | Service | » |
Akita Nairiku Jūkan Railway Akita Nairiku Line
Rapid: Does not stop at this station
| Okashinai | - | Hitachinai |

== History ==
Iwanome Station opened on 15 October 1963 as a station on the Japan National Railways (JNR) serving the town of Ani, Akita. The line was privatized on 1 November 1986, becoming the Akita Nairiku Jūkan Railway.

== Surrounding area ==
- National Route 105
