= Maeda-Minami Station =

Railway station in Kitaakita, Akita Prefecture, Japan

Maeda-Minami Station 前田南駅
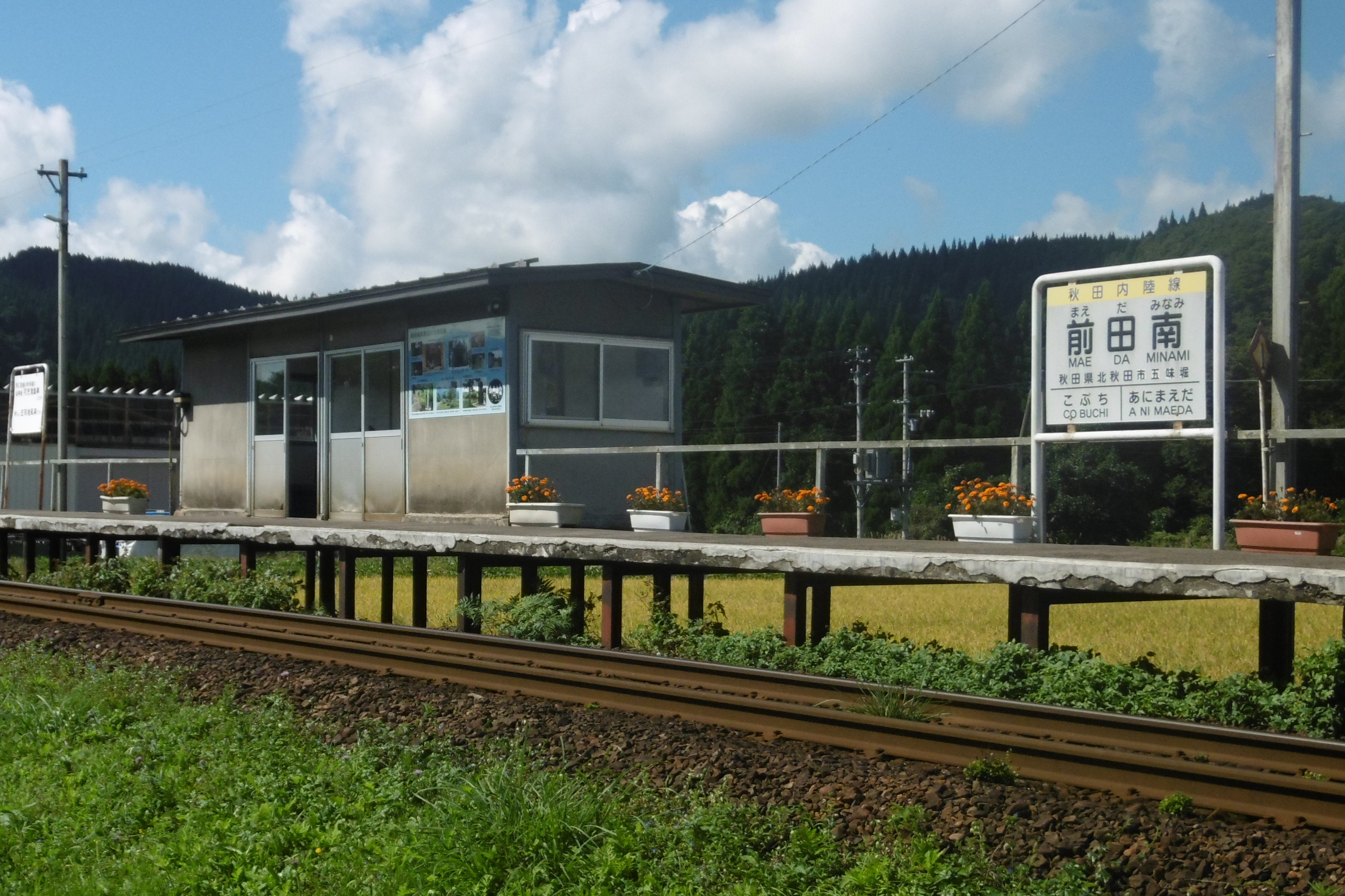
- Maeda-Minami Station, September 2016

General information
- Location: Donomae Gomihori, Kitaakita-shi, Akita-kan 018-4514; Japan
- Coordinates: 40°03′2.13″N 140°24′8.21″E
- Operator: Akita Nariku Railway
- Line: ■ Nairiku Line
- Distance: 21.1 kilometers from Takanosu
- Platforms: 1 side platform

Other information
- Status: Unstaffed
- Website: Official website

History
- Opened: October 15, 1963

Passengers
- FY2016: 7
Location
- Location within Akita Prefecture Location within Japan

Maeda-Minami Station (前田南駅, Maeda-Minami-eki) is a railway station located in the city of Kitaakita, Akita Prefecture, Japan, operated by the third sector railway operator Akita Nairiku Jūkan Railway.

== Lines ==
Maeda-Minami Station is served by the Nariku Line, and is located 21.1 km from the terminus of the line at Takanosu Station.

== Station layout ==
The station consists of one side platform serving a single bi-directional track. The station is unattended.

== Adjacent stations ==
«	Service	»
Akita Nairiku Jūkan Railway Akita Nairiku Line
Rapid: Does not stop at this station
Ani-Maeda Onsen	-	Kobuchi

== History ==
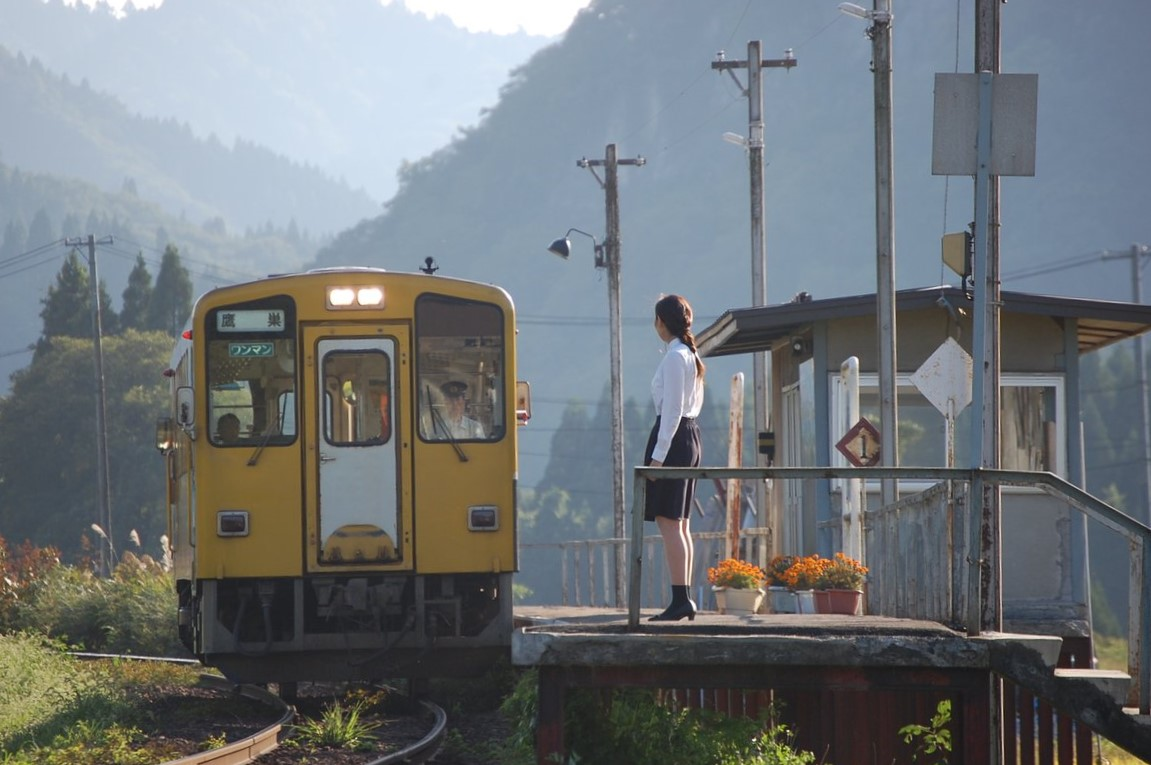
The station photographed with a composition similar to the scene with the station in Your Name

Maeda-Minami Station opened on 15 October 1963 as a station on the Japan National Railways (JNR) serving the town of Moriyoshi, Akita. The line was privatized on 1 November 1986, becoming the Akita Nairiku Jūkan Railway.

In 2016 the success of the animated film Your Name brought many visitors to Maeda-Minami Station, since fans noticed the close similarity of the station with a station illustrated in the film. In response, the Akita Nairiku Jūkan Railway ran an express train service that stops at Maeda-Minami from October 7 to November 6.

== Surrounding area ==
- National Route 105
- Ani River
