= Kayakusa Station =

Railway station in Kitaakita, Akita Prefecture, Japan

Kayakusa Station 萱草駅
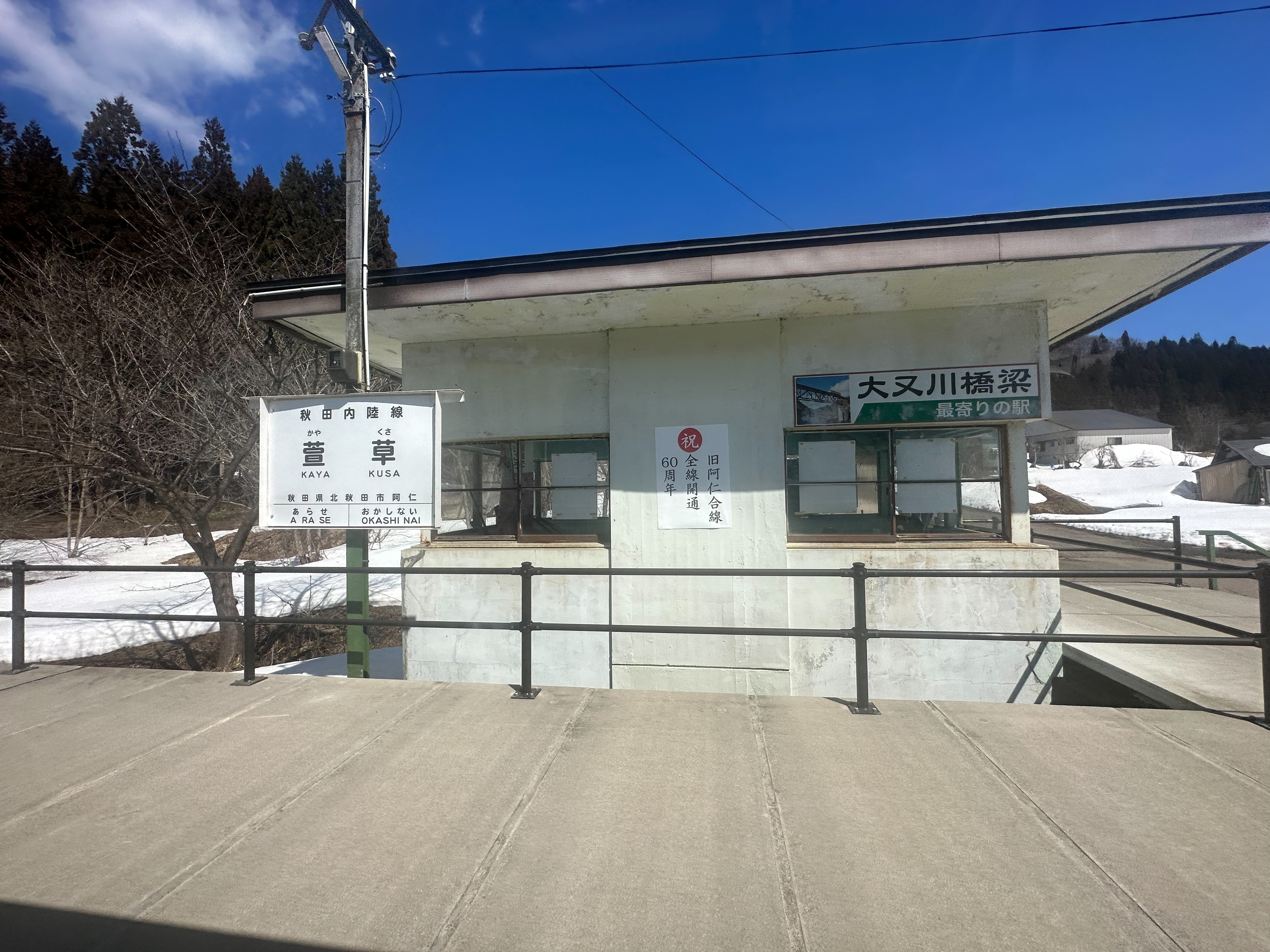
- Kayakusa Station, 2024

General information
- Location: Mizukamiguchi Anikayakusa, Kitaakita-shi, Akita-ken 018-4745; Japan
- Coordinates: 39°57′30.97″N 140°24′44.50″E
- Operator: Akita Nariku Railway
- Line: ■ Nairiku Line
- Distance: 38.1 kilometers from Takanosu
- Platforms: 1 side platform

Other information
- Status: Unstaffed
- Website: Official website

History
- Opened: October 15, 1963
Location
- Location within Akita Prefecture Location within Japan

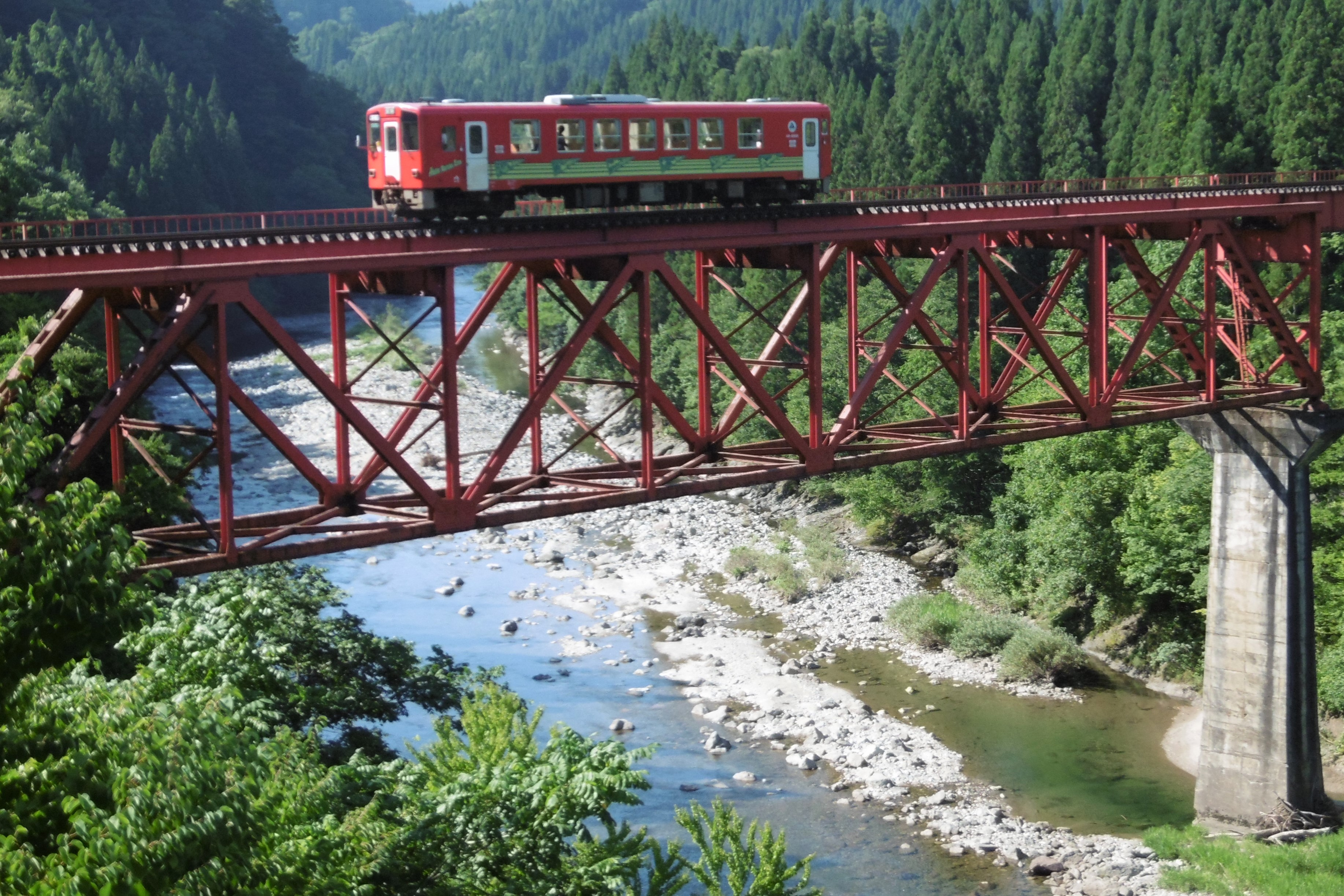
Omatagawa bridge

Kayakusa Station (萱草駅, Kayakusa-eki) is a railway station located in the city of Kitaakita, Akita Prefecture, Japan, operated by the third sector railway operator Akita Nairiku Jūkan Railway.

== Lines ==
Kayakusa Station is served by the Nariku Line, and is located 38.1 km from the terminus of the line at Takanosu Station.

== Station layout ==
The station consists of one side platform serving a single bi-directional track. The station is unattended.

== Adjacent stations ==
«	Service	»
Akita Nairiku Jūkan Railway Akita Nairiku Line
Rapid: Does not stop at this station
Arase	-	Okashinai

== History ==
Kayakusa Station opened on 15 October 1963 as a station on the Japan National Railways (JNR) serving the town of Ani, Akita. The line was privatized on 1 November 1986, becoming the Akita Nairiku Jūkan Railway.

== Surrounding area ==
- National Route 105
- Ani River
