= Kobuchi Station (Akita) =

Railway station in Kitaakita, Akita Prefecture, Japan

Kobuchi Station 小渕駅
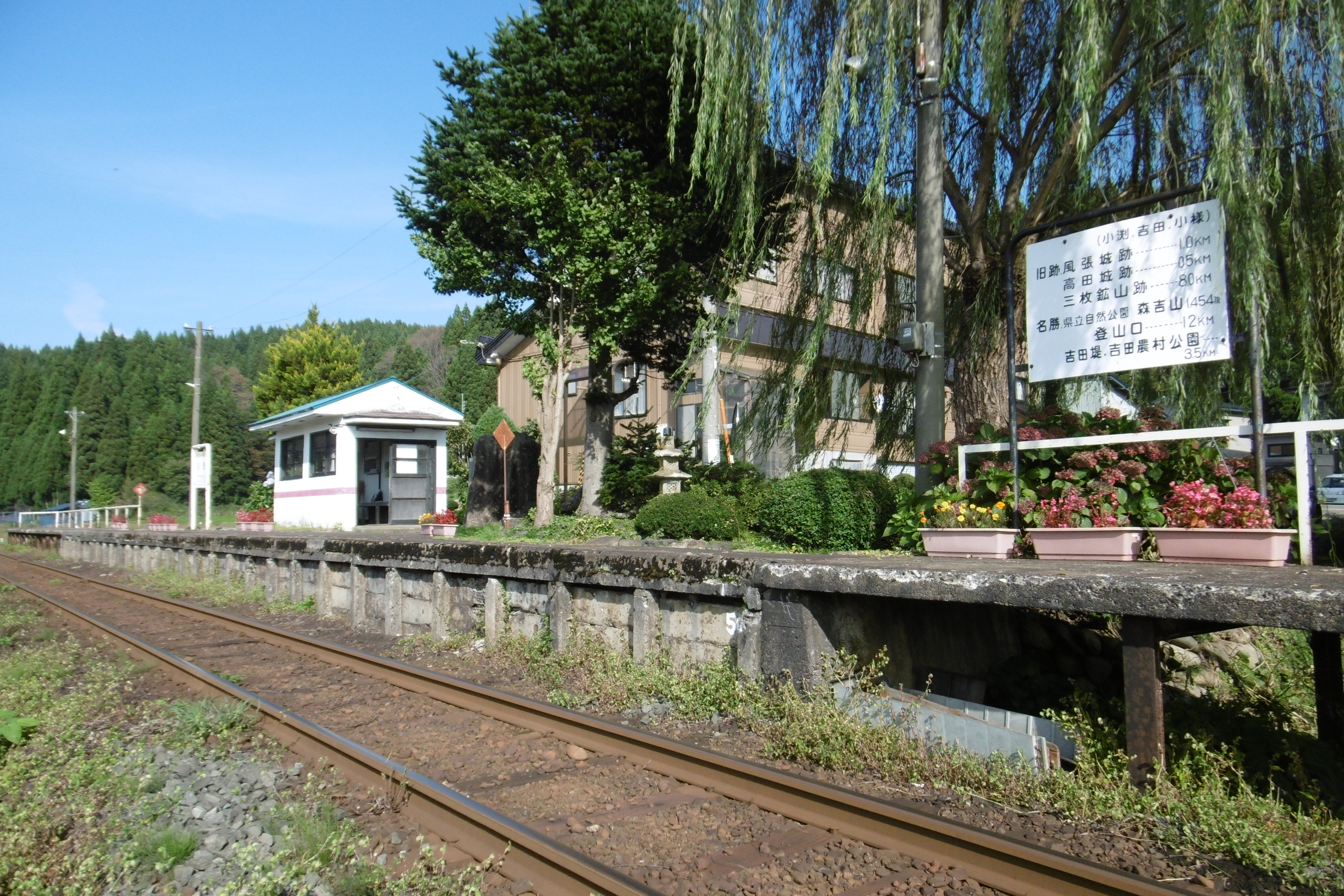
- Kobuchi Station, October 2016

General information
- Location: Yaji Anikobuchi, Kitaakita-shi, Akita-ken 018-4602; Japan
- Coordinates: 40°02′0.85″N 140°24′4.06″E
- Operator: Akita Nariku Railway
- Line: ■ Nairiku Line
- Distance: 29.1 kilometers from Takanosu
- Platforms: 1 side platform

Other information
- Status: Unstaffed
- Website: Official website

History
- Opened: September 25, 1936
Location
- Location within Akita Prefecture Location within Japan

Kobuchi Station (小渕駅, Kobuchi-eki) is a railway station located in the city of Kitaakita, Akita Prefecture, Japan, operated by the third sector railway operator Akita Nairiku Jūkan Railway.

== Lines ==
Kobuchi Station is served by the Nariku Line, and is located 29.1 km from the terminus of the line at Takanosu Station.

== Station layout ==
The station consists of one side platform serving a single bi-directional track. The station is unattended.

== Adjacent stations ==
| « | Service | » |
Akita Nairiku Jūkan Railway Akita Nairiku Line
Rapid: Does not stop at this station
| Maeda-Minami | - | Aniai |

== History ==
Kobuchi Station opened on 25 September 1936 as a station on the Japanese Government Railways (JGR) Aniai Line, serving the town of Ani, Akita. The JGR became the Japan National Railways (JNR) after World War II, and the line was extended to Hitachinai Station by 15 October 1963. The line was privatized on 1 November 1986, becoming the Akita Nairiku Jūkan Railway.

== Surrounding area ==
- National Route 105
- Ani River
