= Arase Station =

Railway station in Kitaakita, Akita Prefecture, Japan

Arase Station 荒瀬駅
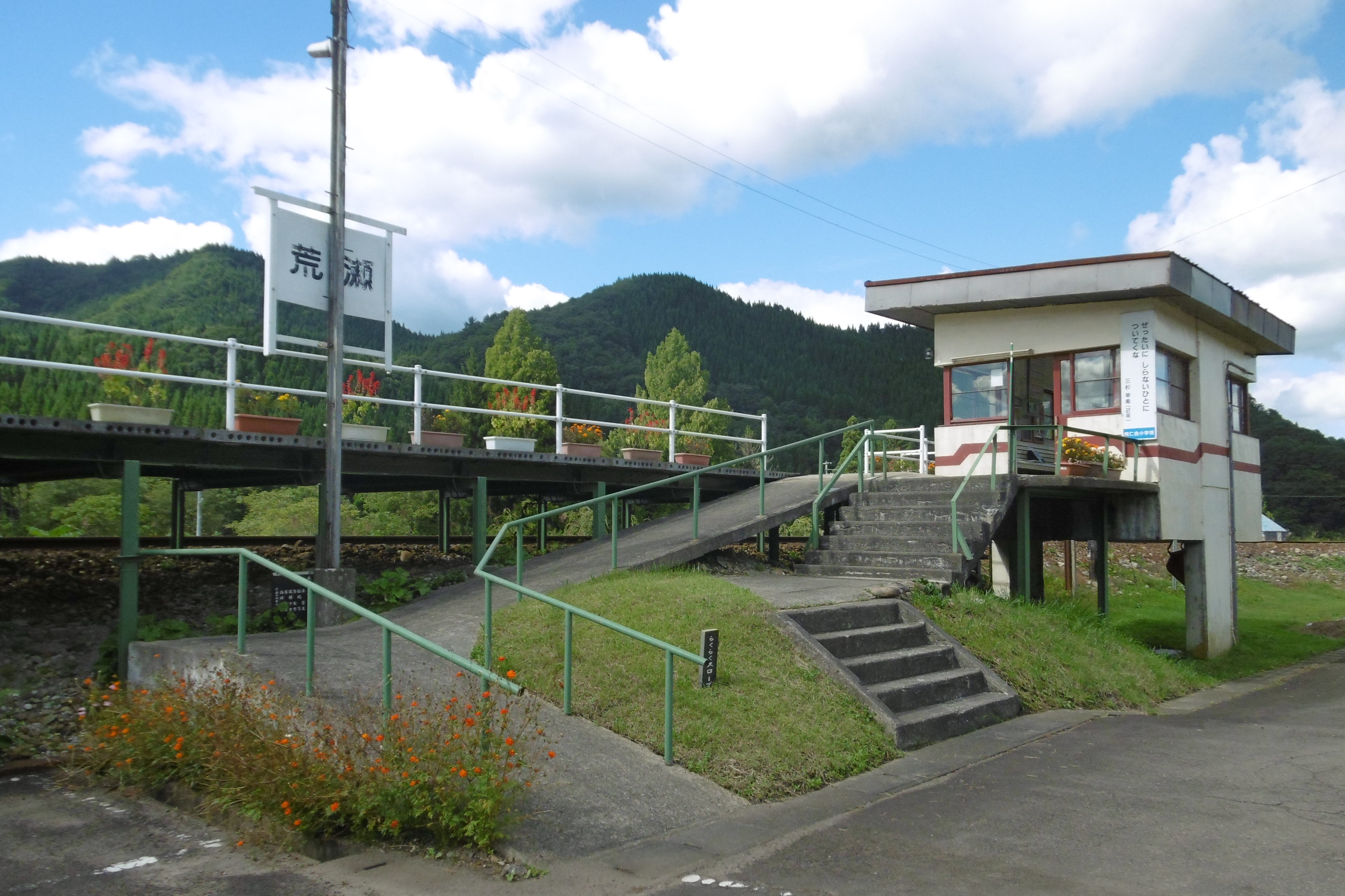
- Arase Station, October 2016

General information
- Location: Nakano Aniarase, Kitaakita-shi, Akita-ken 018-4621; Japan
- Coordinates: 39°58′48.32″N 140°24′8.92″E
- Operator: Akita Nariku Railway
- Line: ■ Nairiku Line
- Distance: 35.4 kilometers from Takanosu
- Platforms: 1 side platform

Other information
- Status: Unstaffed
- Website: Official website

History
- Opened: October 15, 1963
Location
- Location within Akita Prefecture Location within Japan

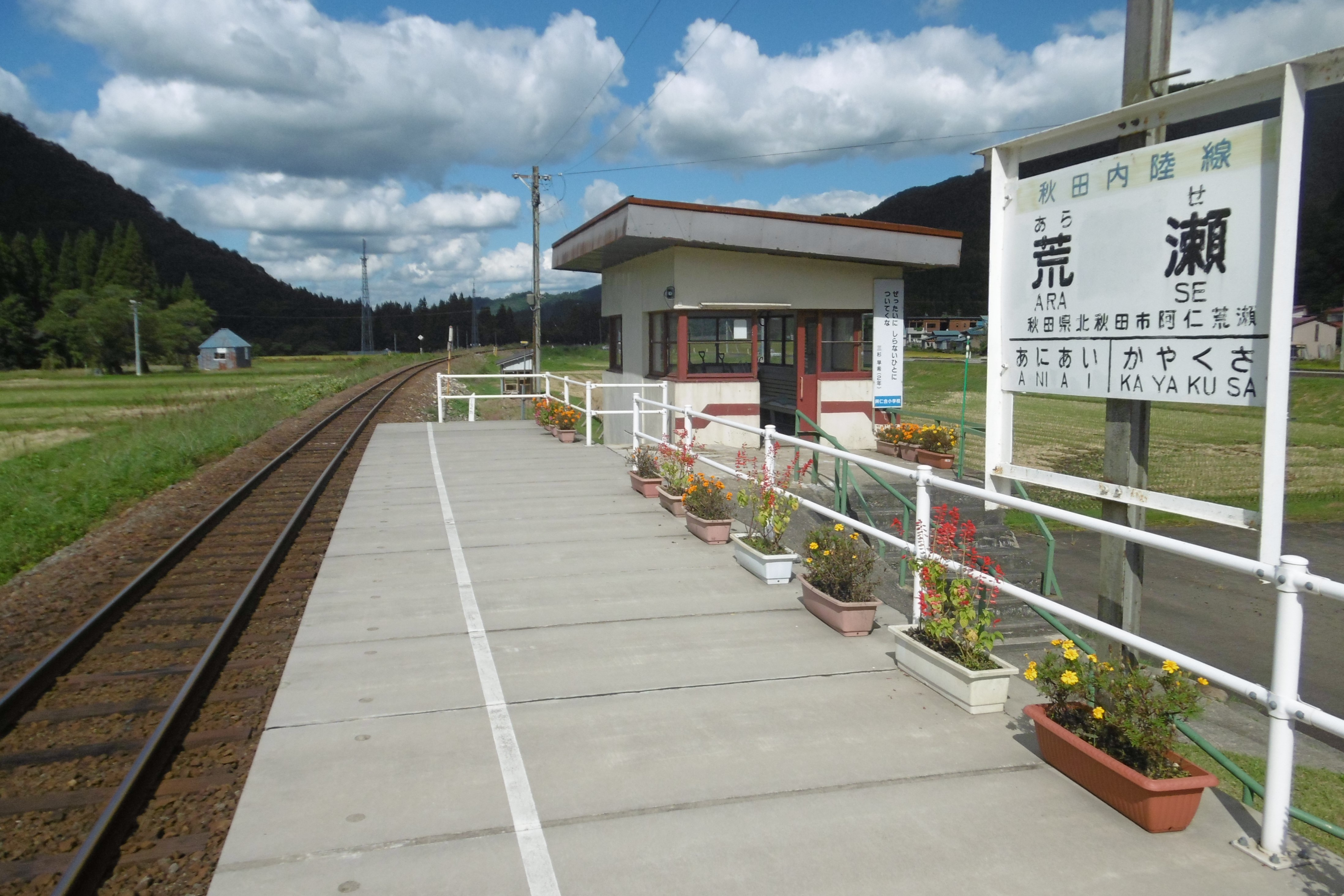
Platform

Arase Station (荒瀬駅, Arase-eki) is a railway station located in the city of Kitaakita, Akita Prefecture, Japan, operated by the third sector railway operator Akita Nairiku Jūkan Railway.

== Lines ==
Arase Station is served by the Nariku Line, and is located 35.4 km from the terminus of the line at Takanosu Station.

== Station layout ==
The station consists of one side platform serving a single bi-directional track. The station is unattended.

== Adjacent stations ==
«	Service	»
Akita Nairiku Jūkan Railway Akita Nairiku Line
Rapid: Does not stop at this station
Aniai	-	Kayakusa

== History ==
Arase Station opened on 15 October 1963, as a station on the Japan National Railways (JNR) serving the town of Ani, Akita. The line was privatized on 1 November 1986, becoming the Akita Nairiku Jūkan Railway.

== Surrounding area ==
- National Route 105
- Ani River
