= Okuani Station =

Railway station in Kitaakita, Akita Prefecture, Japan

Okuani Station 奥阿仁駅
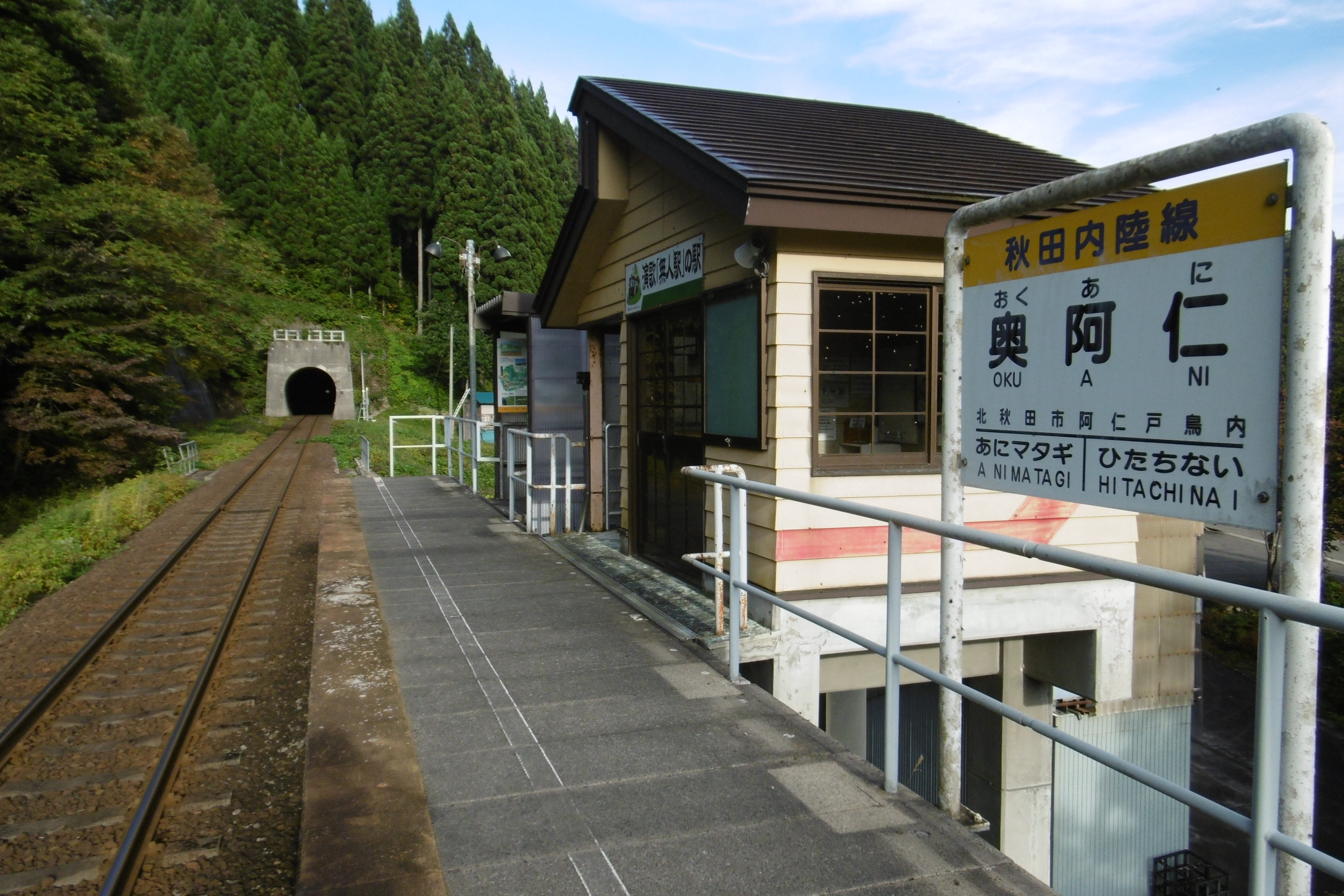
- Okuani Station, October 2016

General information
- Location: Oguradai Anitotorinai, Kitaakita-shi, Akita-ken 018-4733; Japan
- Coordinates: 39°54′40.40″N 140°29′19.64″E
- Operator: Akita Nariku Railway
- Line: ■ Nairiku Line
- Distance: 49.7 kilometers from Takanosu
- Platforms: 1 side platform

Other information
- Status: Unstaffed
- Website: Official website

History
- Opened: April 1, 1989
Location
- Location within Akita Prefecture Location within Japan

Okuani Station (奥阿仁駅, Okuani-eki) is a railway station located in the city of Kitaakita, Akita Prefecture, Japan, operated by the third sector railway operator Akita Nairiku Jūkan Railway.

== Lines ==
Okuani Station is served by the Nariku Line, and is located 49.7 km from the terminus of the line at Takanosu Station.

== Station layout ==
The station consists of one side platform serving a single bi-directional track. The station is unattended.

== Adjacent stations ==
| « | Service | » |
Akita Nairiku Jūkan Railway Akita Nairiku Line
Rapid: Does not stop at this station
| Hitachinai | - | Ani-Matagi |

== History ==
Okuani Station opened on 1 April 1989 serving the town of Ani, Akita. The opening of the station coincided with the start of operations on the central section of the Nairiku Line between Matsuba and Hitachinai.

== Surrounding area ==
- Akita Prefectural Route 308
