= Kamisugi Station =

Kamisugi Station may refer to:

- Kamisugi Station (Akita)
- Kamisugi Station (Hiroshima)
