= Hitachinai Station =

Railway station in Kitaakita, Akita Prefecture, Japan

Hitachinai Station 比立内駅
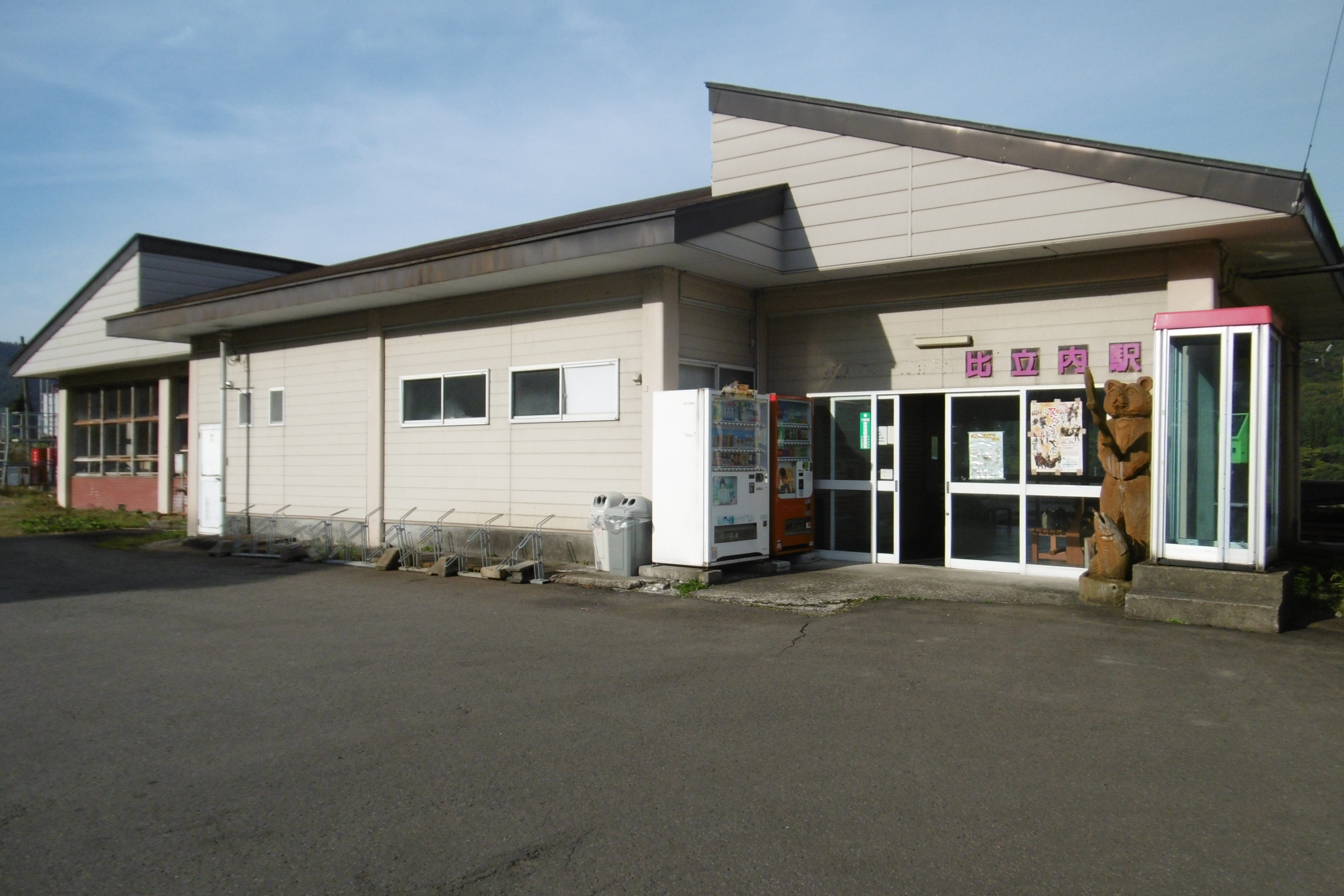
- Hitachinai Station, October 2016

General information
- Location: Anihitachinai, Kitaakita-shi, Akita-ken 018-4735; Japan
- Coordinates: 39°54′18.17″N 140°27′10.88″E
- Operator: Akita Nariku Railway
- Line: ■ Nairiku Line
- Distance: 46.0 kilometers from Takanosu
- Platforms: 1 island platform

Other information
- Status: Unstaffed
- Website: Official website

History
- Opened: October 15, 1963
Location
- Location within Akita Prefecture Location within Japan

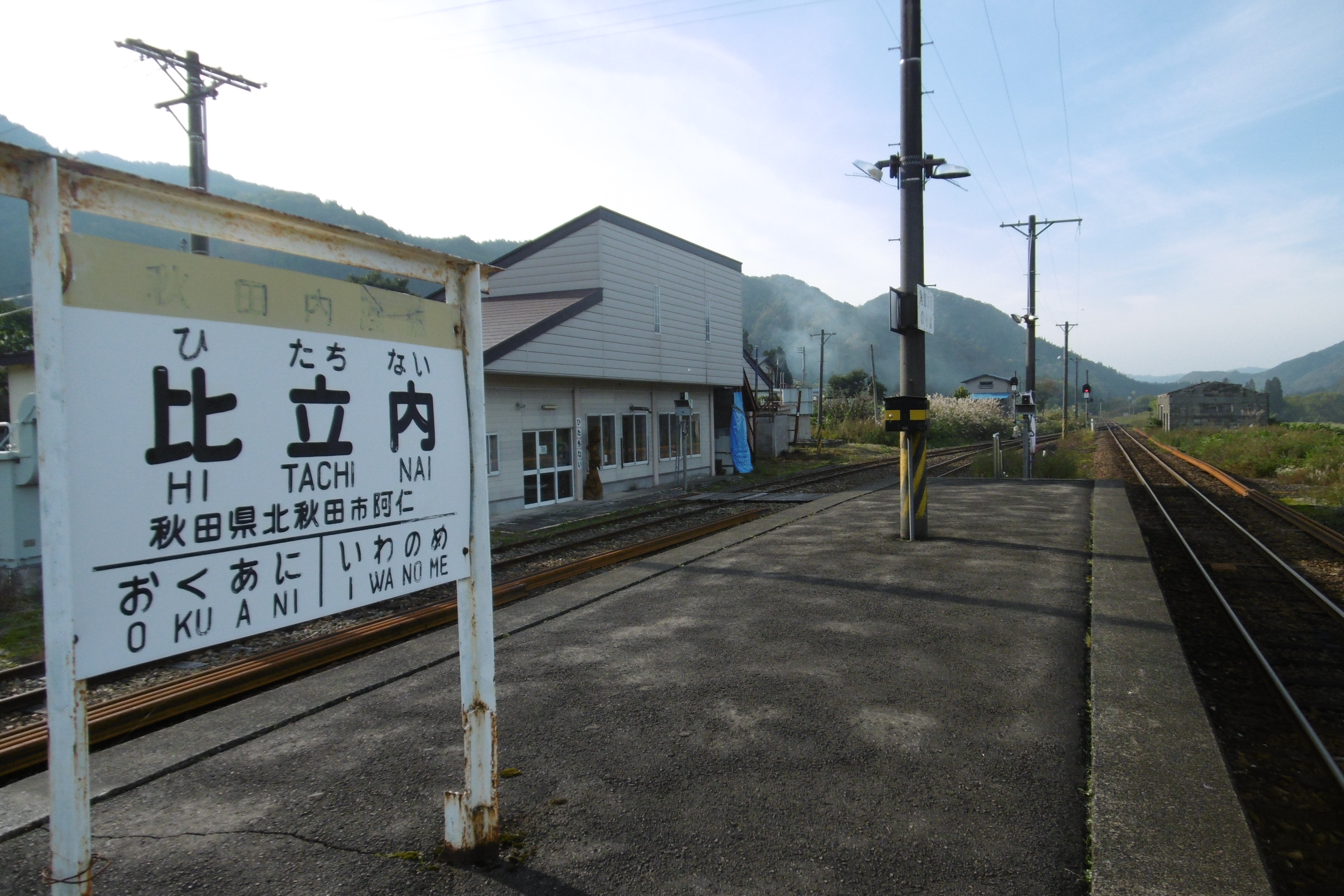
Platform

Hitachinai Station (比立内駅, Hitachinai-eki) is a railway station located in the city of Kitaakita, Akita Prefecture, Japan, operated by the third sector railway operator Akita Nairiku Jūkan Railway.

== Lines ==
Hitachinai Station is served by the Nariku Line, and is located 46.0 km from the terminus of the line at Takanosu Station.

== Station layout ==
The station consists of one island platform. The station is unattended.

== Adjacent stations ==
«	Service	»
Akita Nairiku Jūkan Railway Akita Nairiku Line
Aniai	Express Moriyoshi	Ani-Matagi
Iwanome	-	Okuani

== History ==
Hitachinai Station opened on 15 October 1963 as a station on the Japan National Railways (JNR) Aniai Line, serving the town of Ani, Akita. The line was privatized on 1 November 1986, becoming the Akita Nairiku Jūkan Railway.

== Surrounding area ==
- National Route 105
- Oani Elementary School
