= Yatsu Station =

Yatsu Station is the name of two train stations in Japan:

- Yatsu Station (Akita) (八津駅)
- Yatsu Station (Chiba) (谷津駅)
