= Yatsu Station (Akita) =

Railway station in Semboku, Akita Prefecture, Japan

Yatsu Station 八津駅
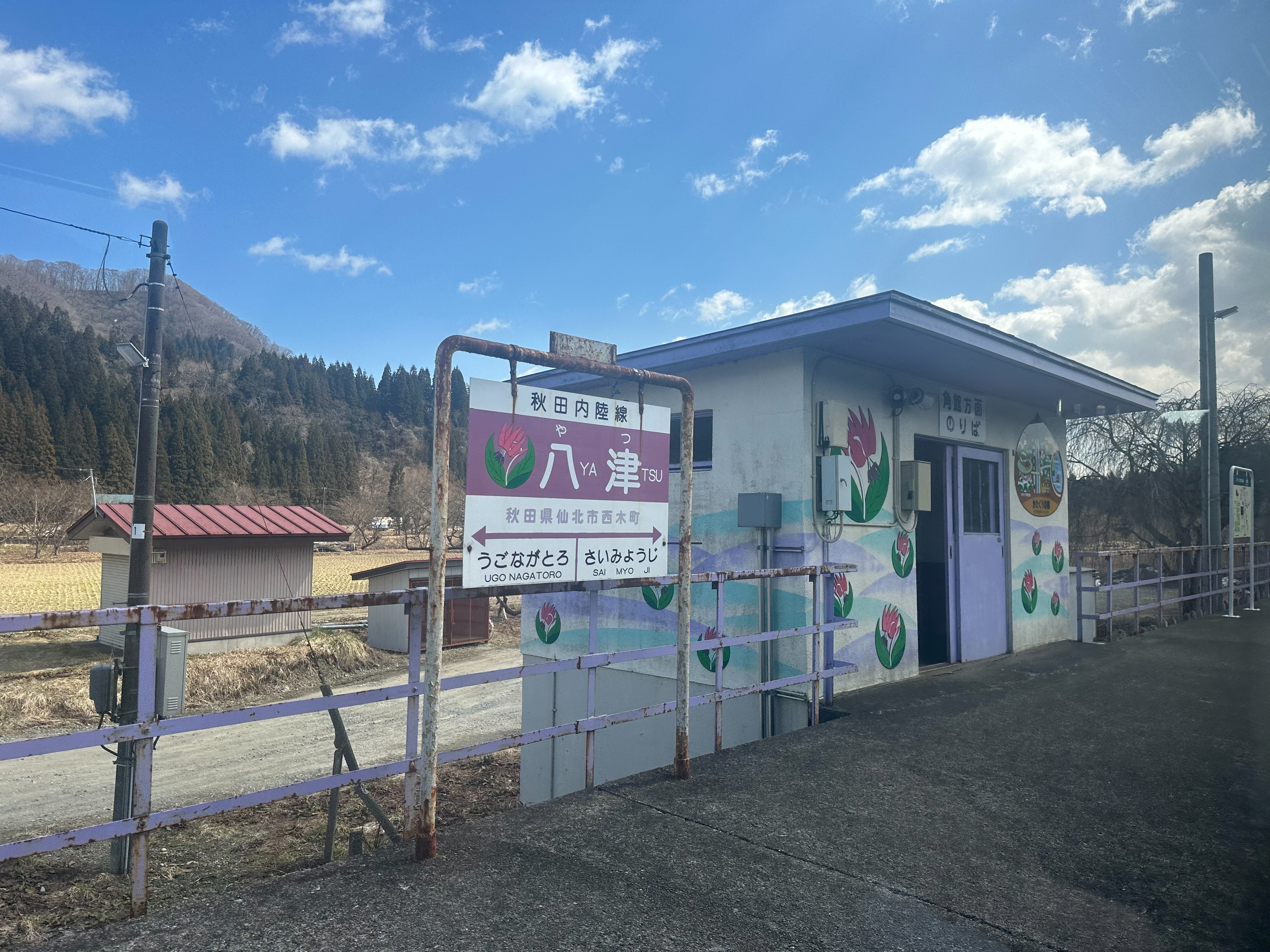
- Yatsu Station, March 2024

General information
- Location: Yatsu Nishikicho Koyamada, Semboku-shi, Akita-ken 014-0516; Japan
- Coordinates: 39°41′16.32″N 140°33′10.08″E
- Operator: Akita Nariku Railway
- Line: ■ Nairiku Line
- Distance: 82.9 kilometers from Takanosu
- Platforms: 1 side platform

Other information
- Status: Unstaffed
- Website: Official website

History
- Opened: April 1, 1989
Location
- Location within Akita Prefecture Location within Japan

Yatsu Station (八津駅, Yatsu-eki) is a railway station located in the city of Semboku, Akita Prefecture, Japan, operated by the third sector railway operator Akita Nairiku Jūkan Railway.

== Lines ==
Yatsu Station is served by the Nariku Line, and is located 82.9 km from the terminus of the line at Takanosu Station.

== Station layout ==
The station consists of one side platform serving a single bi-directional track. The station is unattended. There is no station building, but only a shelter built on the platform.

== Adjacent stations ==
«	Service	»
Akita Nairiku Jūkan Railway Akita Nairiku Line
Rapid: Does not stop at this station
Ugo-Nagatoro	-	Saimyoji

== History ==
Yatsu Station opened on November 1, 1971 as a station on the Japan National Railways (JNR) Kakunodate Line, serving the town of Nishiki, Akita. The line was privatized on 1 November 1986, becoming the Akita Nairiku Jūkan Railway.

== Surrounding area ==
- National Route 105
