= Kobuchi Station =

Kobuchi Station is the name of two train stations in Japan:

- Kobuchi Station (Akita) (小渕駅)
- Kobuchi Station (Kanagawa) (古淵駅)
