= Kamisugi Station (Akita) =

Railway station in Kitaakita, Akita Prefecture, Japan

Kamisugi Station 上杉駅
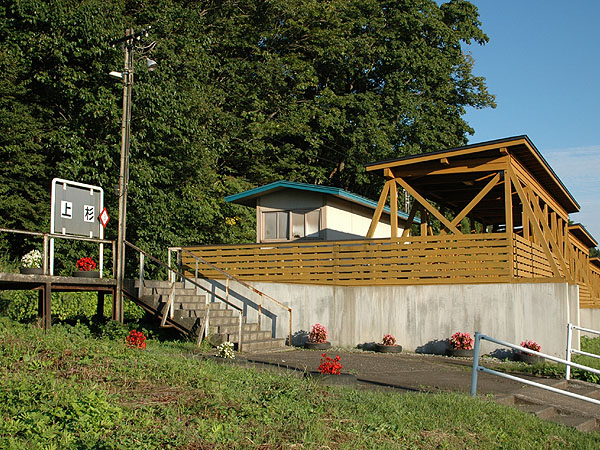
- Kamisugi Station, September 2005

General information
- Location: Sozentai Kamisugi, Kitaakita-shi, Akita-ken 018-4231; Japan
- Coordinates: 40°08′47.44″N 140°20′58.24″E
- Operator: Akita Nariku Railway
- Line: ■ Nairiku Line
- Distance: 12.1 kilometers from Takanosu
- Platforms: 1 side platform

Other information
- Status: Unstaffed
- Website: Official website

History
- Opened: November 21, 1965

Passengers
- FY2016: 10
Location
- Location within Akita Prefecture Location within Japan

Kamisugi Station (上杉駅, Kamisugi-eki) is a railway station located in the city of Kitaakita, Akita Prefecture, Japan, operated by the third sector railway operator Akita Nairiku Jūkan Railway.

== Lines ==
Kamusugi Station is served by the Nariku Line, and is located 12.1 km from the terminus of the line at Takanosu Station.

== Station layout ==
The station consists of one side platform serving a single bi-directional track. The station is unattended.

== Adjacent stations ==
«	Service	»
Akita Nairiku Jūkan Railway Akita Nairiku Line
Rapid: Does not stop at this station
Aikawa	-	Yonaizawa

== History ==
Kamisugi Station opened on 21 November 1965 as a station on the Japan National Railways (JNR) serving the town of Aikawa, Akita. The line was privatized on 1 November 1986, becoming the Akita Nairiku Jūkan Railway.

== Surrounding area ==
- Ani River
