= Nishi-Takanosu Station =

Railway station in Kitaakita, Akita Prefecture, Japan

Nishi-Takanosu Station 西鷹巣駅
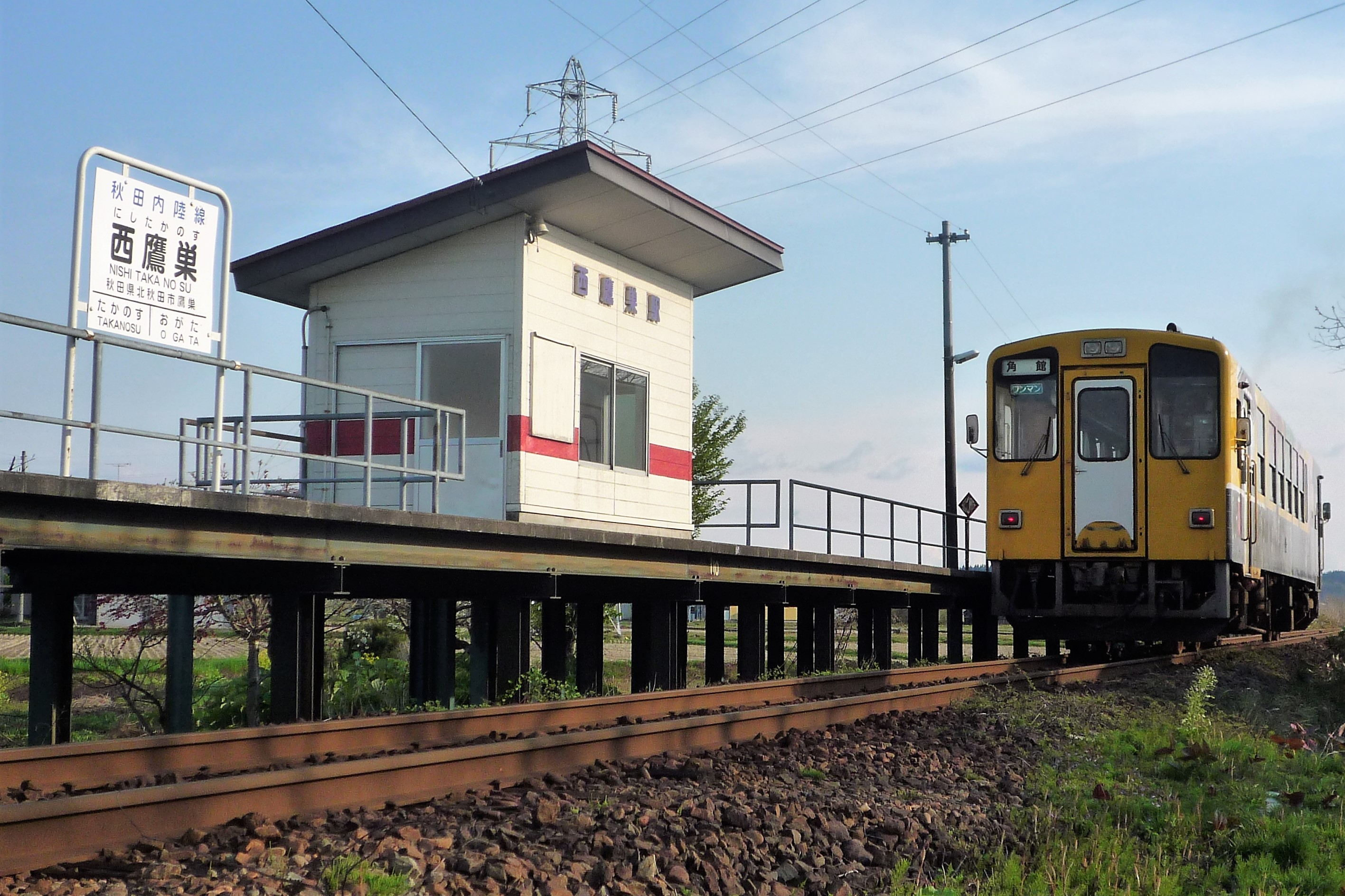
- Nishi-Takanosu Station, May 2016

General information
- Location: Higashinakatai Takanosu, Kitaakita-shi, Akita-ken 018-3331; Japan
- Coordinates: 40°13′28.86″N 140°21′28.52″E
- Operator: Akita Nariku Railway
- Line: ■ Nairiku Line
- Distance: 1.3 kilometers from Takanosu
- Platforms: 1 side platform

Other information
- Status: Unstaffed
- Website: Official website

History
- Opened: April 1, 1989

Passengers
- FY2016: 5
Location
- Location within Akita Prefecture Location within Japan

Nishi-Takanosu Station (西鷹巣駅, Nishi-Takanosu-eki) is a railway station located in the city of Kitaakita, Akita Prefecture, Japan, operated by the third sector railway operator Akita Nairiku Jūkan Railway.

== Lines ==
Nishi-Takanosu Station is served by the Nariku Line, and is located 1.3 km from the terminus of the line at Takanosu Station.

== Station layout ==
The station consists of one side platform serving a single bi-directional track. The station is unattended.

== Adjacent stations ==
«	Service	»
Akita Nairiku Jūkan Railway Akita Nairiku Line
Rapid: Does not stop at this station
Takanosu	-	Jōmon-Ogata

== History ==
Nishi-Takanosu Station opened on April 1, 1989 serving the town of Takanosu, Akita.

== Surrounding area ==
- Kitaakika City Fire Department
- Kitaakita City Police Department
