= Aniai Station =

Railway station in Kitaakita, Akita Prefecture, Japan

Aniai Station 阿仁合駅
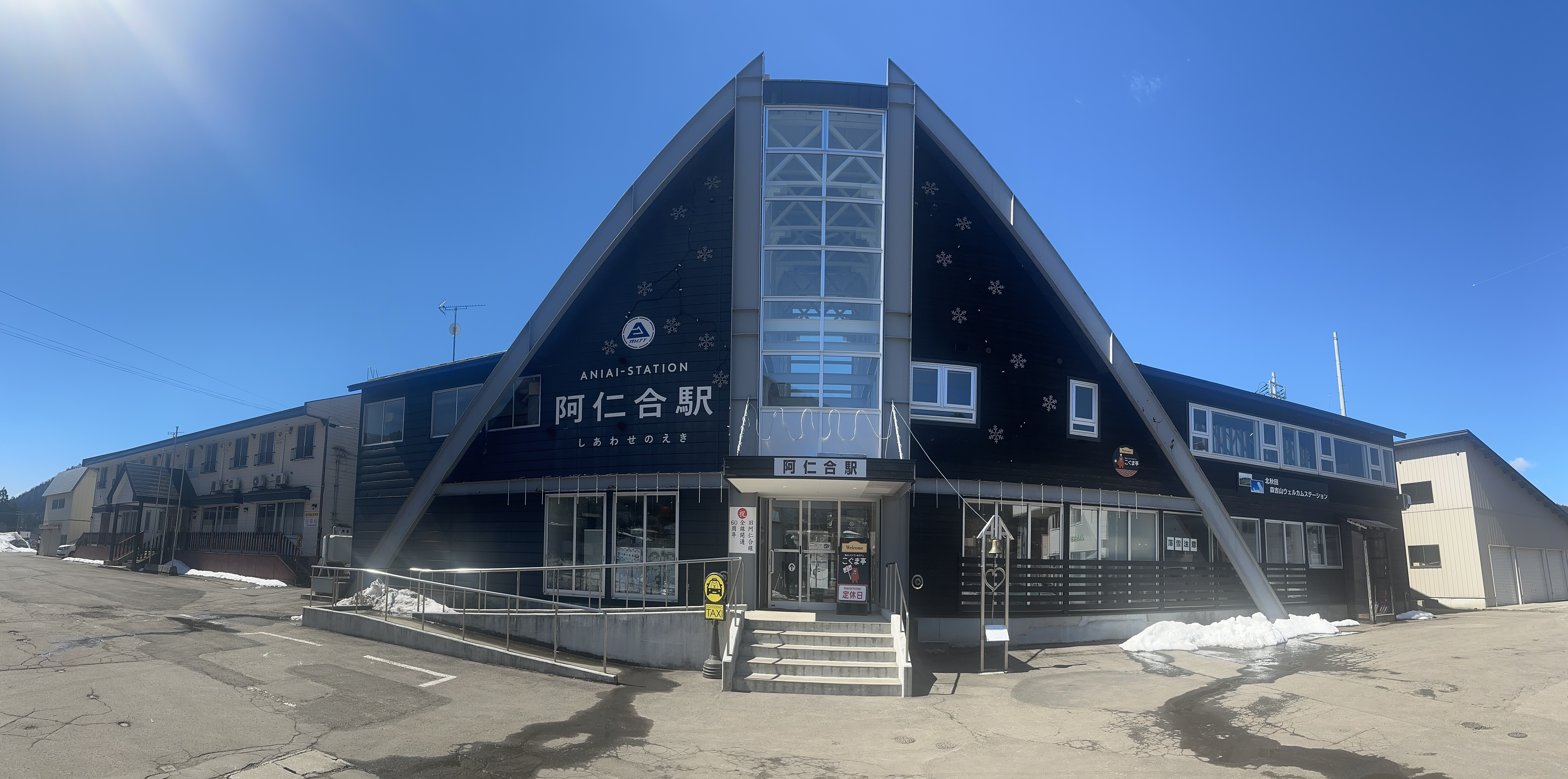
- Aniai Station (March 2024)

General information
- Location: Shimoshinmachi Aniginzan, Kitaakita-shi, Akita-ken; Japan
- Coordinates: 40°0′2.77″N 140°24′5.35″E
- Operator: Akita Nariku Railway
- Line: ■ Nairiku Line
- Distance: 33.0 kilometers from Takanosu
- Platforms: 1 island platform

Other information
- Status: Staffed
- Website: Official website

History
- Opened: September 25, 1936
Location
- Location within Akita Prefecture Location within Japan

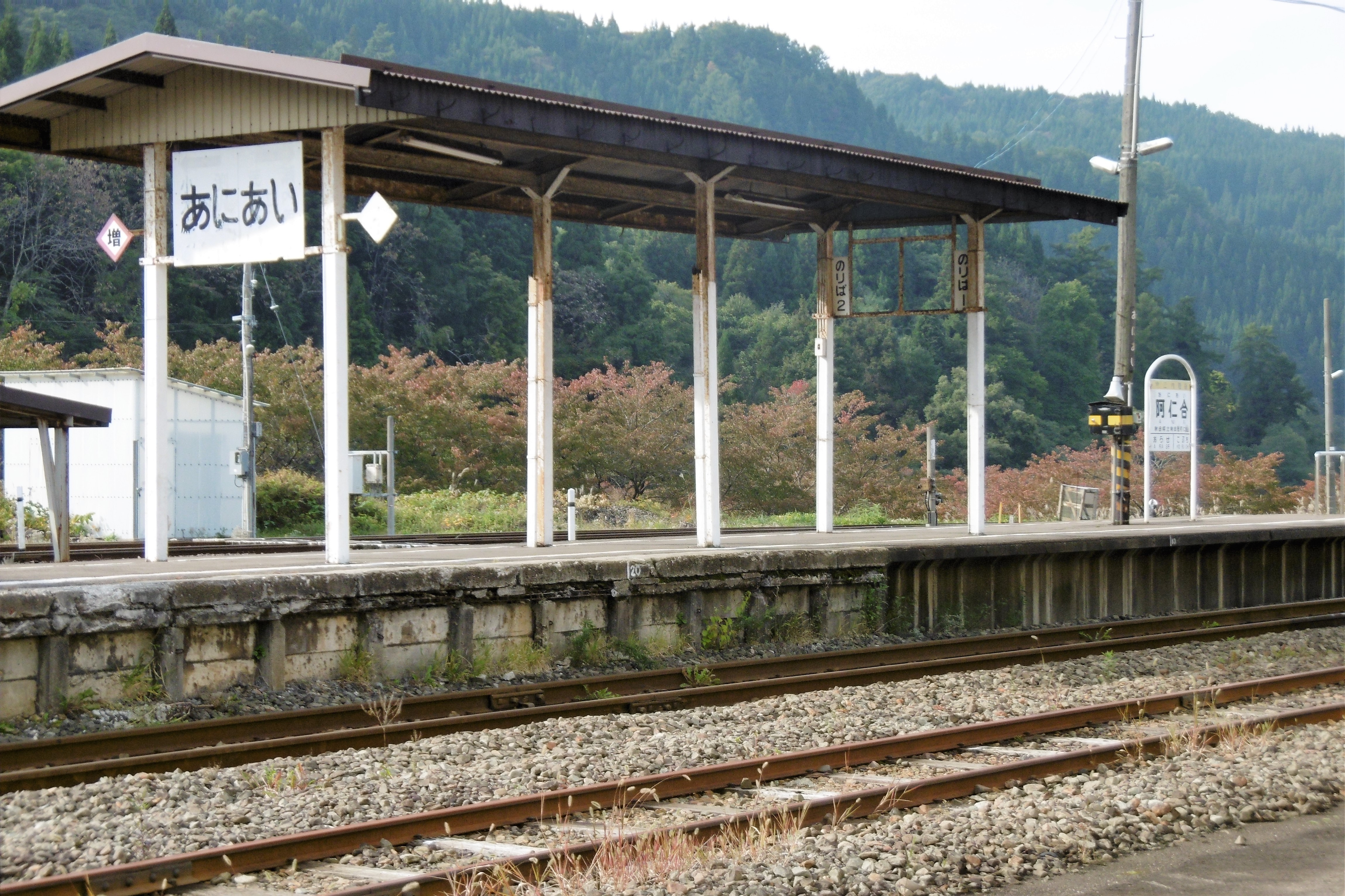
Platform

Aniai Station (阿仁合駅, Aniai-eki) is a railway station located in the city of Kitaakita, Akita Prefecture, Japan, operated by the third sector railway operator Akita Nairiku Jūkan Railway.

== Lines ==
Aniai Station is served by the Nariku Line, and is located 33.0 km from the terminus of the line at Takanosu Station.

== Station layout ==
The station consists of a single island platform serving two tracks, connected to the station building by a level crossing. The station is staffed, and the second story of the station building contains the offices of the Akita Nairiku Jūkan Railway.

== Adjacent stations ==
«	Service	»
Akita Nairiku Jūkan Railway Akita Nairiku Line
Ani-Maeda	Express Moriyoshi	Hitachinai
Kobuchi	-	Arase

== History ==
Aniai Station opened on 25 September 1936, as a station on the Japanese Government Railways (JGR) Aniai Line, serving the town of Ani, Akita. The JGR became the Japan National Railways (JNR) after World War II, and the line was extended to Hitachinai Station by 15 October 1963. The line was privatized on 1 November 1986, becoming the Akita Nairiku Jūkan Railway.

== Surrounding area ==
- National Route 105
- Aniai River
