= Akita Nairiku Line =

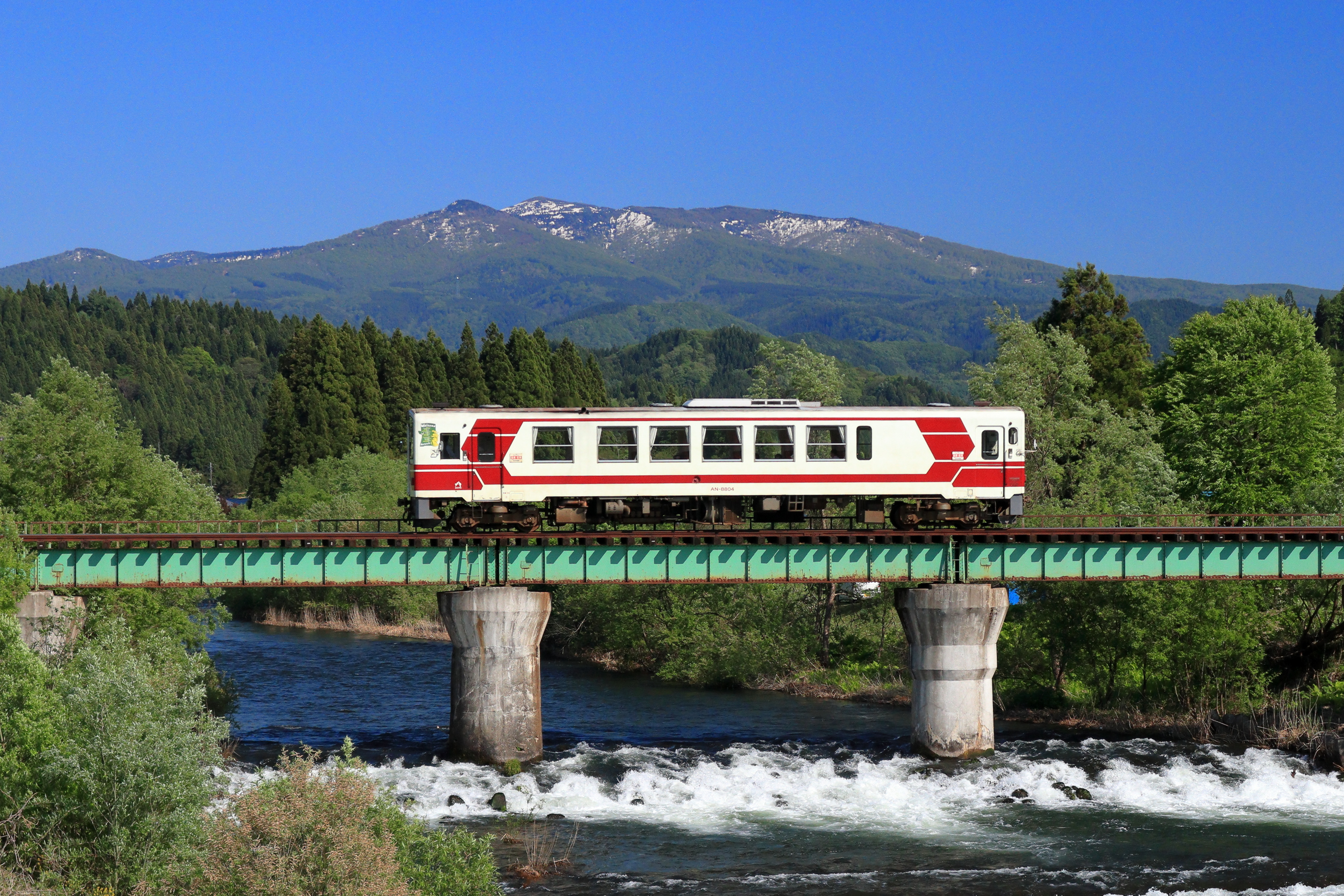
- Akita Nairiku Line and Mount Moriyoshi

Overview
- Native name: 秋田内陸線
- Status: Operational
- Owner: Akita Nairiku Jūkan Railway Company
- Locale: Akita Prefecture
- Termini: Takanosu; Kakunodate
- Stations: 29
- Website: www.akita-nairiku.com

Service
- Type: Heavy rail
- Operator: Akita Nairiku Jūkan Railway Company
- Rolling stock: AN8800 series DMU, AN8900 series DMU, AN2000 series DMU

History
- Opened: 1930; 96 years ago

Technical
- Line length: 94.2 km (58.5 mi)
- Num of tracks: Entire line single tracked
- Character: Rural
- Track gauge: 1,067 mm (3 ft 6 in)
- Electrification: None
- Operating speed: 85 km/h (53 mph)

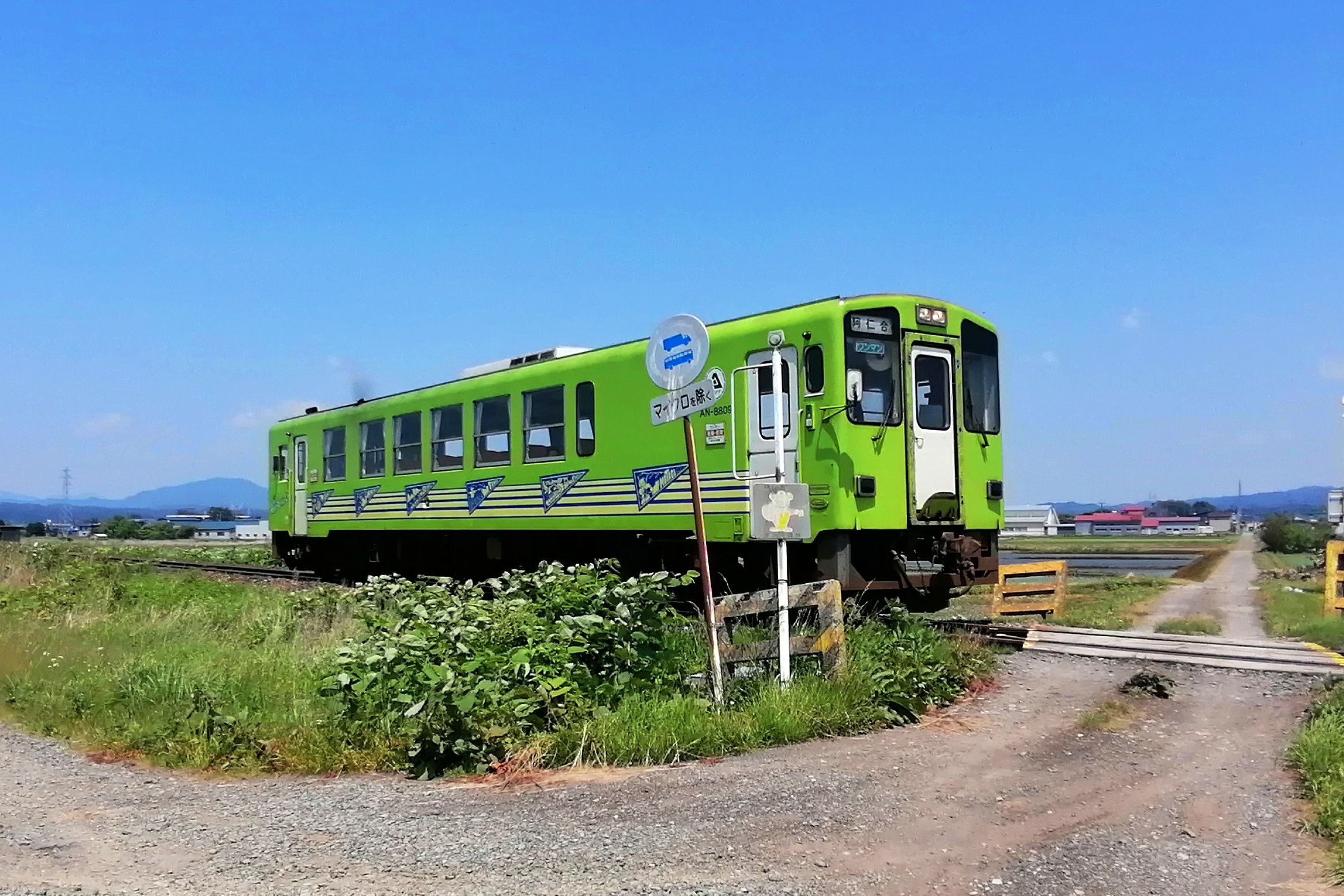
AN-8800 series DMU

The Akita Nairiku Line (秋田内陸線, Akita Nairiku-sen), nicknamed Smile Rail (スマイルレール), is a Japanese railway line located in Akita Prefecture in northern Japan. It operates between Takanosu in the city of Kitaakita and Kakunodate in the city of Semboku. The Akita Nariku Line is the only railway line operated by the third-sector company Akita Nairiku Jukan Tetsudo (秋田内陸縦貫鉄道, Akita Nairiku Jūkan Tetsudō; lit. 'Akita Inland Longitudinal Railway').

== Service outlines ==
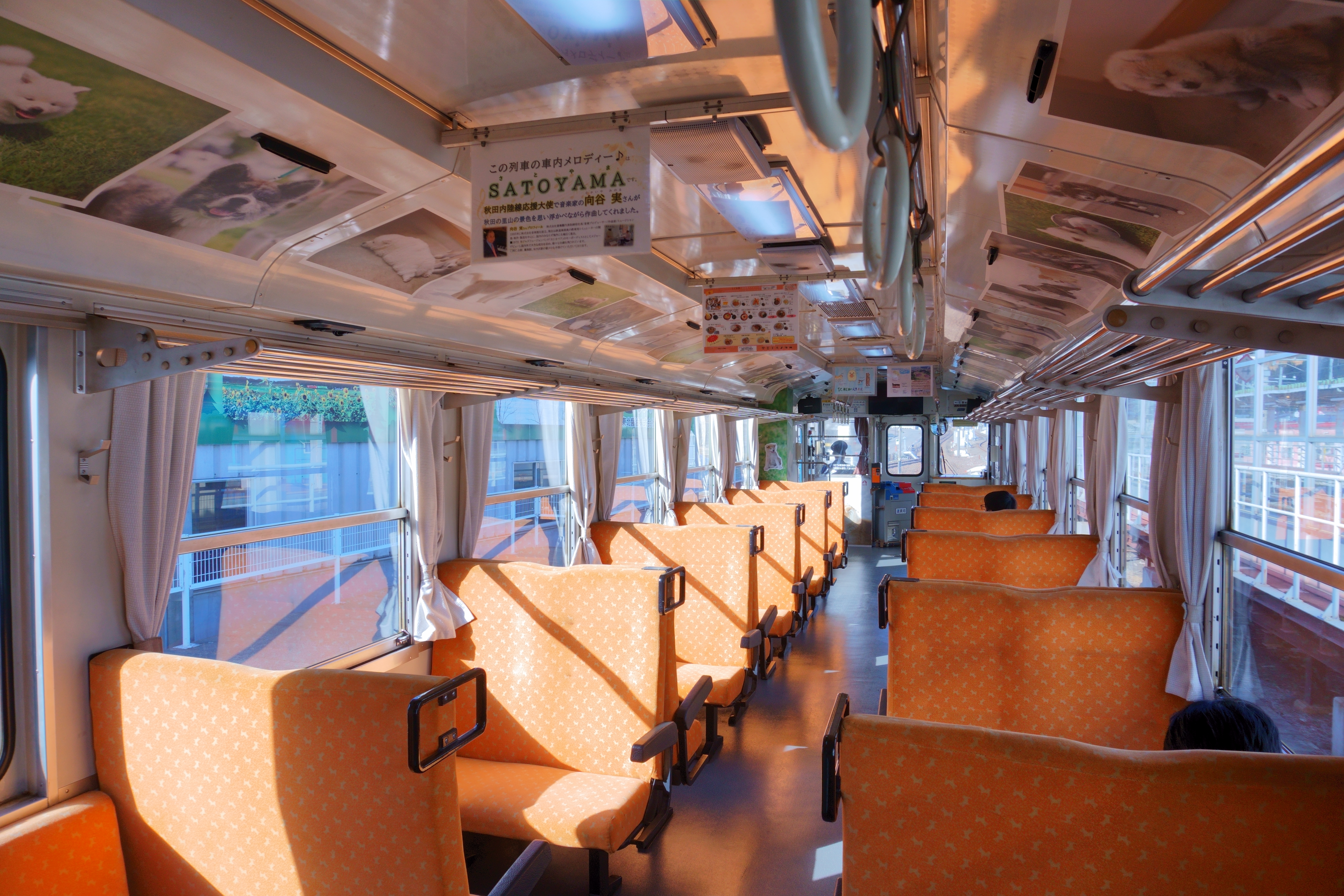
Interior of an AN-8800 series DMU

Trains on the line are operated as "Local" (all-stations), "Rapid", or "Special Rapid", along with the Express Moriyoshi service.

== Station list ==
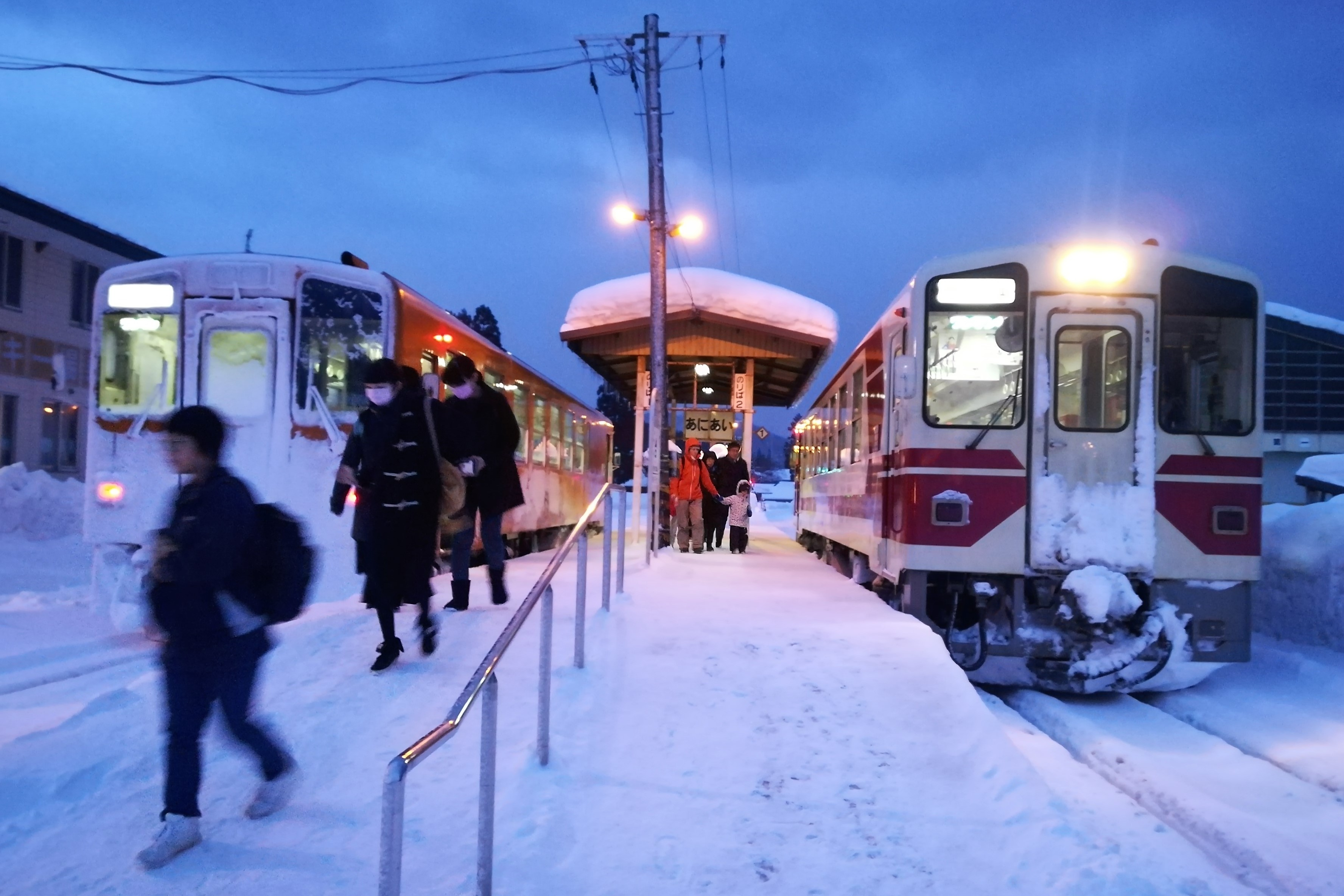
Aniai Station, February 2018

All stations are in Akita Prefecture.

Transfers are available only at Takanosu (JR Ou Main Line) and Kakunodate (JR Tazawako Line and Akita Shinkansen).

- Local trains stop all stations.
  - Rapid = Can only be used by paying a rapid fare.
  - Express Moriyoshi - Express fare costs 160 yen up to 50 km, 320 yen for longer journeys
  - ●：All trains stop
  - ◆・▲・▼：Partly trains stop（▲：Only inbound、▼：Only outbound）
  - |：Pass

Stations			km		Rapid	Express Moriyoshi	Connects	Locale
Stations			Distance	Amount distance	Rapid	Express Moriyoshi	Connects	Locale
Former Aniai Line section	Takanosu	鷹巣	-	0.0	●	●	JR East：■ Ou Main Line（Takanosu Station）	Kita-Akita
Former Aniai Line section	Nishi-Takanosu	西鷹巣	1.3	1.3	●	|		Kita-Akita
Former Aniai Line section	Jōmon-Ogata	縄文小ヶ田	2.4	3.7	●	●		Kita-Akita
Former Aniai Line section	Ōnodai	大野台	2.4	6.1	●	|		Kita-Akita
Former Aniai Line section	Aikawa	合川	3.6	9.7	●	●		Kita-Akita
Former Aniai Line section	Kamisugi	上杉	2.4	12.1	●	|		Kita-Akita
Former Aniai Line section	Yonaizawa	米内沢	2.9	15.0	●	●		Kita-Akita
Former Aniai Line section	Katsurase	桂瀬	5.5	20.5	●	|		Kita-Akita
Former Aniai Line section	Ani-Maeda Onsen	阿仁前田温泉	4.7	25.2	●	●		Kita-Akita
Former Aniai Line section	Maeda-Minami	前田南	1.9	27.1	●	|		Kita-Akita
Former Aniai Line section	Kobuchi	小渕	2.0	29.1	●	|		Kita-Akita
Former Aniai Line section	Aniai	阿仁合	3.9	33.0	●	●		Kita-Akita
Former Aniai Line section	Arase	荒瀬	2.4	35.4	◆	|		Kita-Akita
Former Aniai Line section	Kayakusa	萱草	2.7	38.1	◆	|		Kita-Akita
Former Aniai Line section	Okashinai	笑内	2.8	40.9	◆	|		Kita-Akita
Former Aniai Line section	Iwanome	岩野目	2.4	43.3	◆	|		Kita-Akita
Former Aniai Line section	Hitachinai	比立内	2.7	46.0	●	●		Kita-Akita
New section	Okuani	奥阿仁	3.7	49.7	▲	|		Kita-Akita
New section	Ani-Matagi	阿仁マタギ	2.6	52.3	●	●		Kita-Akita
New section	Tozawa	戸沢	8.9	61.2	▼	|		Semboku
New section	Kami-Hinokinai	上桧木内	4.7	65.9	●	●		Semboku
New section	Sadori	左通	1.8	67.7	▼	|		Semboku
New section	Ugo-Nakazato	羽後中里	4.0	71.7	▼	|		Semboku
Former Kakunodate Line section	Matsuba	松葉	3.3	75.0	●	●		Semboku
Former Kakunodate Line section	Ugo-Nagatoro	羽後長戸呂	2.9	77.9	▼	|		Semboku
Former Kakunodate Line section	Yatsu	八津	5.0	82.9	▼	|		Semboku
Former Kakunodate Line section	Saimyoji	西明寺	4.0	86.9	●	●		Semboku
Former Kakunodate Line section	Ugo-Ota	羽後太田	3.0	89.9	▼	|		Semboku
Former Kakunodate Line section	Kakunodate	角館	4.3	94.2	●	●	JR East： Akita Shinkansen・■ Tazawako Line	Semboku

== History ==
=== Aniai Line ===
On December 10, 1934, the Japanese Government Railways (JGR) opened the Aniai Line (阿仁合線) connecting Takanosu with Yonaizawa over a length of 15.1 kilometers. Following World War II, the JGR became the Japanese National Railways (JNR), and the line was further extended to Hitachinai by October 15, 1963.

=== Kakunodate Line ===
On November 1, 1971, the JNR Kakunodate Line began operations from Kakunodate to Matsuba, with construction continuing north towards Hitachinai to provide a connection to the Aniai Line. However construction was suspended in 1980 due to JNR funding constraints.

=== Closure ===
The Kakunodate Line was closed by JNR on 11 September 1981, and the Aniai Line on 22 June 1984.

=== Reopening ===
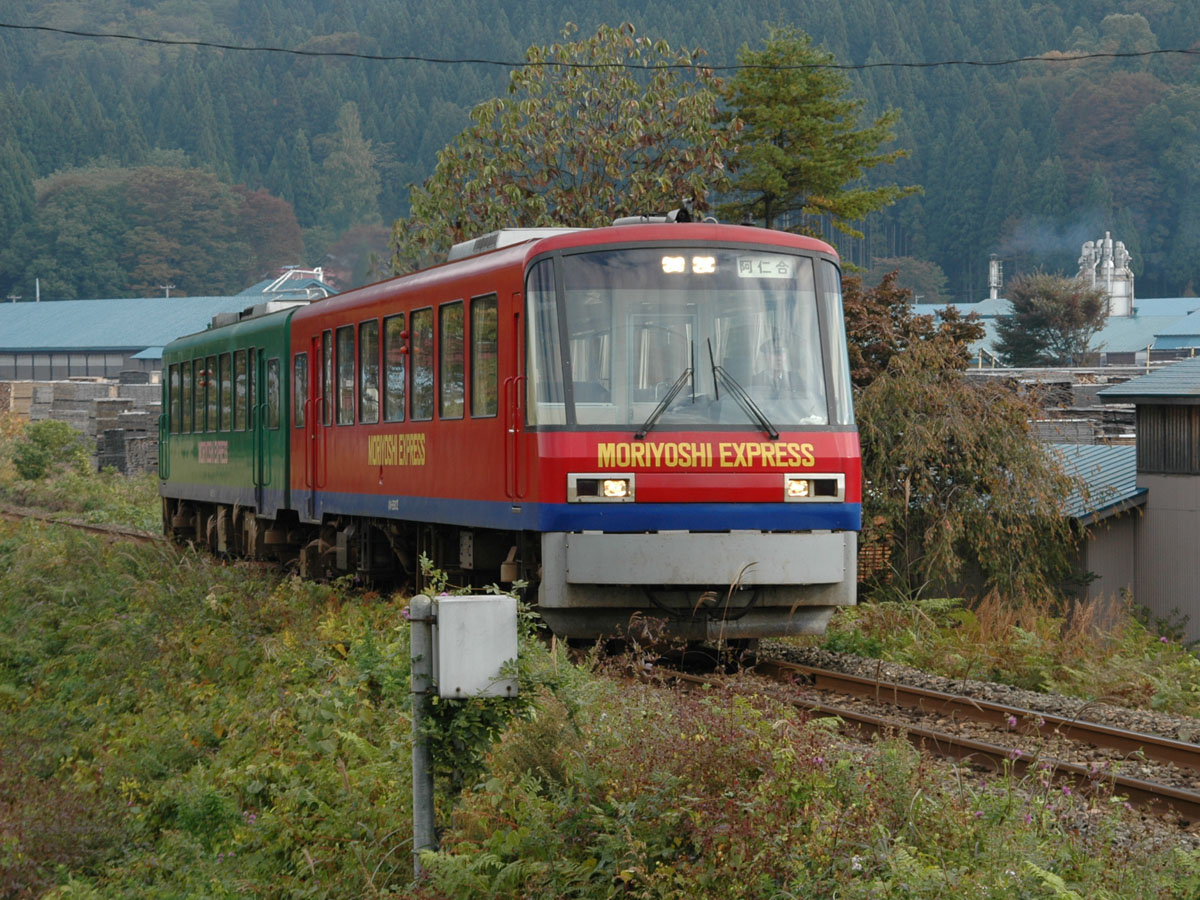
Moriyoshi Express train, October 2005

The third-sector Akita Nairiku Jūkan Railway Company reopened both the Aniai Line – as the Akita Nairiku Kita ("North") Line – and the Kakunodate Line – as the Akita Nairiku Minami ("South") Line – on November 1, 1986. It also recommenced construction of the suspended link which opened on April 1, 1989, creating the current through-route.

=== Nicknames ===
Between 2012 and 2017, the line was nicknamed the Akita Bijin Line (あきた美人ライン, Akita Bijin Rain), referencing the prefecture's beautiful women, known as Akita Bijin. On November 1, 2017, the nickname was changed to Smile Rail Akita Nairiku Line (スマイルレール秋田内陸線, Sumairu Rēru Akita Nairiku-sen).

== See also ==
- List of railway companies in Japan
- List of railway lines in Japan
