= Japan National Route 105 =

Road in Akita Prefecture, Japan

National Route 105
- 国道105号
- Japan National Route 105 highlighted in red

Route information
- Length: 170.0 km (105.6 mi)
- Existed: 1 April 1963–present

Major junctions
- South end: National Route 7 / National Route 341 in Yurihonjō
- North end: National Route 7 in Kitaakita

Location
- Country: Japan

Highway system
- National highways of Japan; Expressways of Japan
← National Route 104	→ National Route 106

National Route 105 (国道105号, Kokudō Hyaku gogō) is a national highway of Japan that traverses the prefecture of Akita in a southwest–northeast routing. It connects the city of Kitaakita in north-central Akita Prefecture and Yurihonjō on the prefecture's southwestern coast. It has a total length of 170.0 kilometers (105.6 mi).

== Route description ==
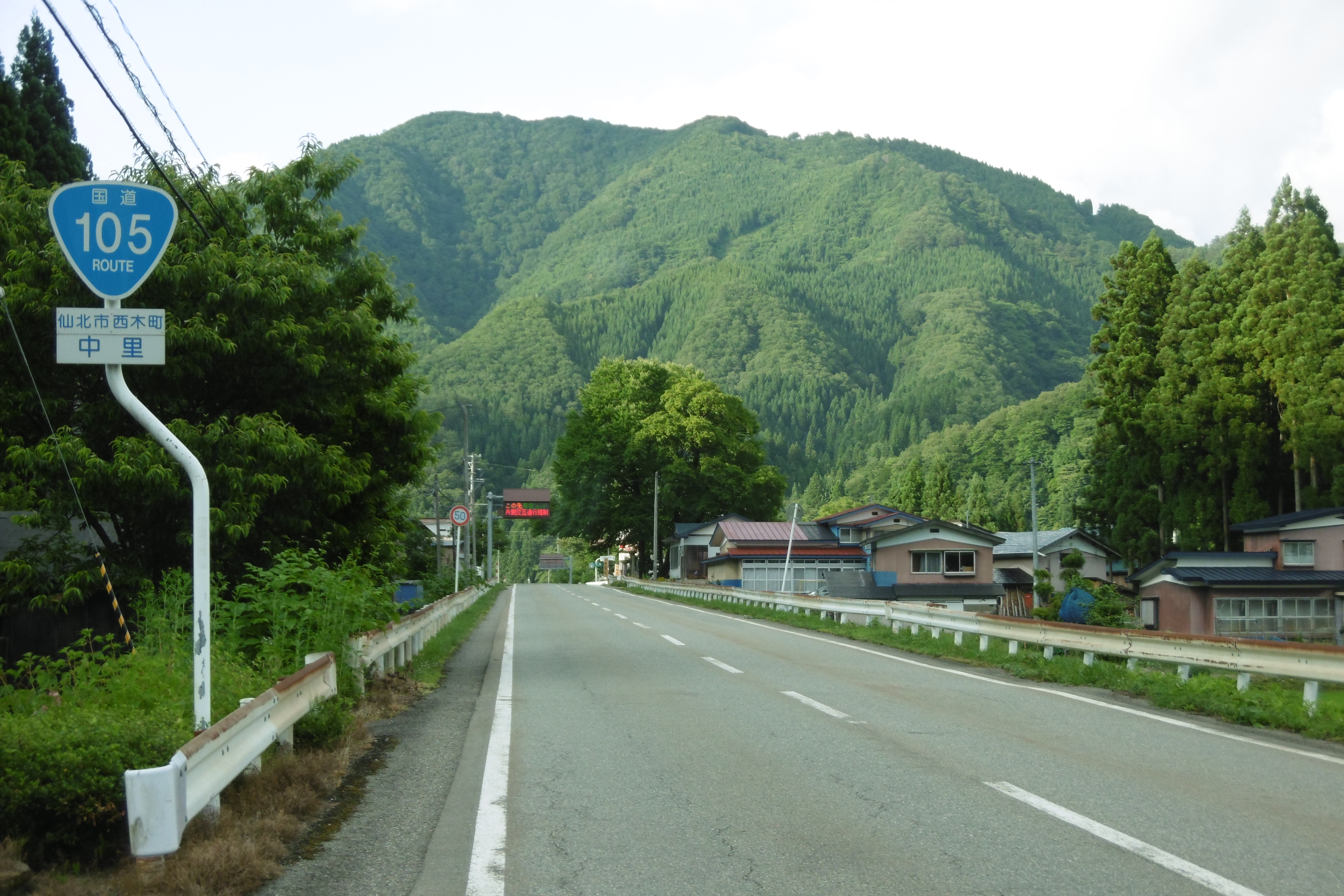
National Route 105 in Semboku looking towards Binzamori

National Route 105 crosses Akita Prefecture in a southwest–northeast routing. Beginning at a junction with national routes 7 and 341 in the coastal city of Yurihonjō, it travels east alongside National Route 107 and National Route 108 through the central district of the city. After crossing over the Uetsu Main Line, the concurrent highways leave National Route 105, with National Route 108 exiting first, heading southwest towards Miyagi Prefecture. Shortly beyond that point, National Route 107 leaves continuing east towards Iwate Prefecture while National Route 105 turns to the north, paralleling the Uetsu Line. Eventually the highway curves to the east again, heading towards Daisen. Southwest of central Daisen, the highway turns to the north at a junction with the Akita Expressway. After passing through the city it enters the city of Semboku, though it passes to the west of the central district on its way towards Kitaakita. From the former village of Kakunodate in Semboku to the former town of Takanosu in Kitaakita, the highway is called the Matagi Road. From southern Semboku to Kitaakita, the highway roughly parallels the Akita Nairiku Line. The highway terminates at a junction with National Route 7 to the north of central Kitaakita. It has a total length of 170.0 kilometers (105.6 mi).

=== Roadside Stations ===
The following Roadside Stations serve National Route 105:

- Roadside Station Ōuchi, in the city of Yurihonjō
- Roadside Station Nakasen, in the city of Daisen
- Roadside Station Ani, in the city of Kitaakita

== History ==
On 1 April 1963, the current National Route 105 was created when it was designated as Secondary National Route 105 between the cities of Ōmagari and Ōdate. The original Secondary National Route 105 was created on 18 May 1953, it is now designated as National Route 46. On 1 April 1965, Secondary National Route 105 was redesignated as General National Route 105. On 1 April 1970 the highway was extended south to Honjō (today's Yurihonjō) and north to Takanosu (today's Kitaakita). From 27 April to 30 June 2019, votes were cast to determine the name of a section of the highway between Kakunodate and Takanosu. On 8 November 2019, the government of Akita Prefecture announced the name chosen for the section of highway was "Matagi Road". The Matagi are a group of traditional winter hunters from the mountainous region of Akita Prefecture where the highway is located.

== Major intersections ==
The route lies entirely within Akita Prefecture.

Location	km	mi	Destinations	Notes
Yurihonjō	0.0	0.0	National Route 7 / National Route 341 north – Sakata, Akita; National Route 107 ends / National Route 108 ends / National Route 398 ends	Southern terminus
Yurihonjō	0.6	0.37	Akita Prefecture Route 165 east	
Yurihonjō	2.3	1.4	National Route 108 east – Yuzawa	Northern end of National Route 108 concurrency
Yurihonjō	2.6	1.6	National Route 107 east / National Route 398 east – to Nihonkai-Tōhoku Expressway, Yokote	Northern end of National Route 107 and National Route 398 concurrency
Yurihonjō	10.7	6.6	Nihonkai-Tōhoku Expressway – Nikaho, Sakata, Akita Airport, Akita	E7 exit 14-1 (Ōuchi Junction)
Yurihonjō	12.7	7.9	Akita Prefecture Route 69 north – Iwaki	Southern end of Akita Prefecture Route 69 concurrency
Yurihonjō	14.9	9.3	Akita Prefecture Route 69 south – Ōuchi Branch Office	Northern end of Akita Prefecture Route 69 concurrency
Yurihonjō	17.1	10.6	Akita Prefecture Route 9 north – Akita Airport, Yūwa	
Yurihonjō	27.9	17.3	Akita Prefecture Route 29 east – Yokote, Nakatashiro	
Daisen	38.6	24.0	Akita Prefecture Route 315 north (Dewa Green Road) – Akita Airport, Kyōwa, Kariwano	
Daisen	40.7	25.3	Akita Prefecture Route 30 (Dewa Green Road) – Jingū-ji, Ugo, Higashiyuri	
Daisen	47.7	29.6	Akita Expressway – Kitakami, Yokote, Noshiro, Akita	E46 exit 4 (Ōmagari Interchange)
Daisen	49.1	30.5	Akita Prefecture Route 36 south – Ugo	Southern end of Akita Prefecture Route 36 concurrency
Daisen	50.1	31.1	National Route 105 (Ōmagari-Nishi Road) – Kakunodate, Yokote, Central Ōmagari	Yamane Interchange; access only to eastbound Ōmagari-Nishi Road and from westbound Ōmagari-Nishi Road
Daisen	51.7	32.1	Akita Prefecture Route 36 north – Central Ōmagari	Northern end of Akita Prefecture Route 36 concurrency
Daisen	55.5	34.5	Akita Prefecture Route 36 south – Ōmagari Station	Northern end of Akita Prefecture Route 36 concurrency
Daisen	56.4	35.0	National Route 13 – Akita, Kyōwa, Yuzawa, Yokote	
Daisen	61.0	37.9	Akita Prefecture Route 261 east – Yokobori	
Daisen	61.8	38.4	Akita Prefecture Route 67 west – Jingū-ji	
Daisen	65.3	40.6	Akita Prefecture Route 256 west – Kariwano	
Daisen	66.8	41.5	Akita Prefecture Route 259 – Ugo-Nagano Station, Toyooka	
Daisen	70.5	43.8	Akita Prefecture Route 11 south – Yokote, Misato, Hotta Fort	
Semboku	71.2	44.2	Akita Prefecture Route 258 – Kakunodate Station, Shiraiwa	
Semboku	72.2	44.9	Akita Prefecture Route 257 – Kakunodate Station, Dakigaeri Gorge	
Semboku	73.8	45.9	National Route 341 south – Akita	Southern end of National Route 341 concurrency
Semboku	74.3	46.2	National Route 341 north – Morioka, Lake Tazawa	Northern end of National Route 341 concurrency
Semboku	74.6	46.4	National Route 46 (Kakunodate Bypass) – Akita, Morioka	Makiguchi Interchange
Semboku	87.6	54.4	Akita Prefecture Route 60 east – Lake Tazawa	
Semboku	93.1	57.8	Akita Prefecture Route 38 east – Lake Tazawa	
Semboku	102.0	63.4	Akita Prefecture Route 321 north – to National Route 341, Hosen Lake	
Kitaakita	122.4	76.1	Akita Prefecture Route 308 east – Utto	Southern end of Akita Prefecture Route 308 concurrency
Kitaakita	122.9	76.4	Akita Prefecture Route 308 south	Northern end of Akita Prefecture Route 308 concurrency
Kitaakita	145.4	90.3	Akita Prefecture Route 214 west – to National Route 285, Kamikoani, Akita; Akita Prefecture Route 309 east – Hinai, Lake Taihei	
Kitaakita	150.6	93.6	Akita Prefecture Route 111 east – Akarimata	
Kitaakita	154.1	95.8	National Route 285 west – Akita, Kamikoani	Southern end of National Route 285 concurrency
Kitaakita	160.7	99.9	Akita Prefecture Route 198 south – Kamifunaki	
Kitaakita	162.4	100.9	National Route 285 east / Akita Prefecture Route 324 – to National Route 7, Odate–Noshiro Airport, Noshiro, Kazuno, Hinai	Interchange; northern end of National Route 285 concurrency
Kitaakita	164.1	102.0	Akita Expressway – Akita, Aomori	E7 exit 24 (Takanosu Interchange)
Kitaakita	167.6	104.1	Akita Prefecture Route 102 – Central Takanosu, Takanosu Station, Mato	
Kitaakita	170.0	105.6	National Route 7 – Akita, Noshiro, Hirosaki, Ōdate	Northern terminus
1.000 mi = 1.609 km; 1.000 km = 0.621 mi: Concurrency terminus; Incomplete access

== Auxiliary routes ==
- Honjō–Ōmagari Road
- Yonaizawa Bypass
- Yokoiwa Bypass
