= Takanosu Station =

Railway station in Kitaakita, Akita Prefecture, Japan

Takanosu Station 鷹ノ巣駅 (鷹巣駅)
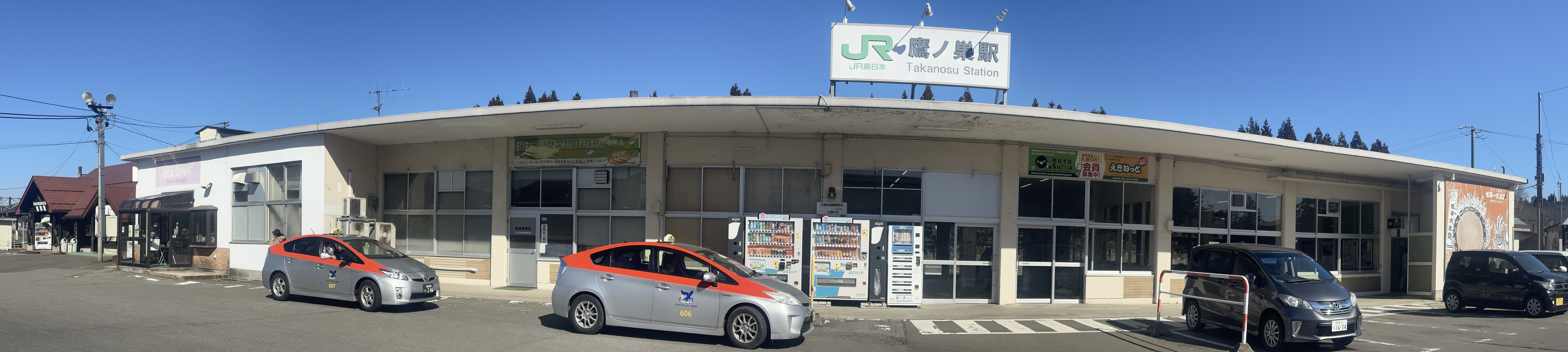
- Wide panorama of both Takanosu Stations in March 2024

General information
- Location: Matsubachō, Kitaakita-shi, Akita-ken 018-3321; Japan
- Coordinates: 40°13′55.39″N 140°22′11.49″E
- Operator: JR East; Akita Nairiku Jūkan Railway
- Lines: ■ Ōu Main Line; ■ Nariku Line
- Distance: 379.5 kilometers from Fukushima
- Platforms: 1 side + 1 island + 1 bay platform

History
- Opened: 7 August 1900

Passengers
- 2018: 581 daily (JR portion)

Services
| Preceding station | JR East | Following station |
|---|---|---|
| Futatsui towards Akita | Tsugaru | Ōdate towards Aomori |
| Futatsui towards Akita | Ōu Main Line Rapid | Hayaguchi towards Aomori |
| Maeyama towards Shinjō | Ōu Main Line Local | Nukazawa towards Aomori |
| Preceding station | Akita Nairiku Jūkan Railway | Following station |
| Ogata towards Kakunodate | Akita Nairiku Line Express Moriyoshi | Terminus |
| Nishi-Takanosu towards Kakunodate | Akita Nairiku Line Local | Terminus |
Location
- Location within Akita Prefecture Location within Japan

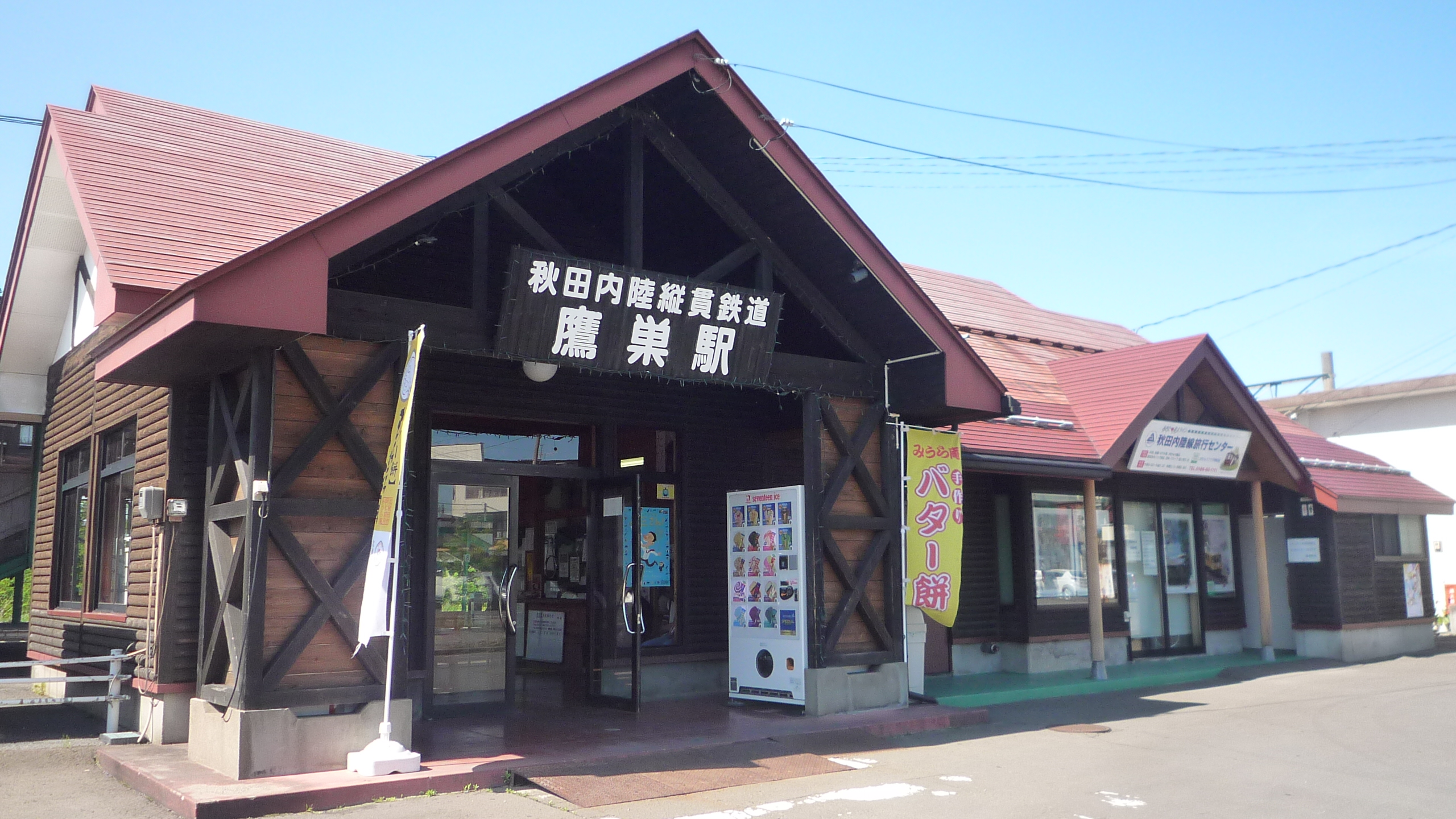
Akita Nairiku Jūkan Railway Akita Nairiku Line Takanosu Station

Takanosu Station (鷹巣駅 or 鷹ノ巣駅, Takanosu-eki) is the name of two adjacent railway stations located in the city of Kitaakita, Akita Prefecture, Japan. One is operated by JR East and the other is operated by the third sector railway operator Akita Nairiku Jūkan Railway.

== Lines ==
Takanosu Station is served by the Ōu Main Line, and is located 379.5 kilometers (235.8 mi) from the terminus of the line at Fukushima Station. It is also a terminal station for the Akita Nairiku Jūkan Railway Akita Nairiku Line and is located 94.2 kilometers (58.5 mi) from the opposing terminal of that line at Kakunodate.

== Station layout ==
Takanosu Station consists of one side platform and one island platform serving three tracks for use by the JR East portion of the station. However, Platform 3 is not in normal use. The adjacent Akita Nairiku Railway portion of the station uses a single bay platform

=== JR East platforms ===
| 1 | ■ Ōu Main Line | for Higashi-Noshiro and Akita |
| 2 | ■ Ōu Main Line | for Ōdate and Hirosaki |
| 3 | ■ Ōu Main Line | not in normal use |

=== Akita Nairiku platform ===
| 1 | ■ Akita Nairiku Line | for Kakunodate |

== History ==
Takanosu Station opened on August 7, 1900 as a station on the Japanese Government Railways (JGR) serving the town of Takanosu, Akita. The JGR Aniai Line began operations from December 10, 1934. The JGR became the Japanese National Railways (JNR) after World War II. The station was absorbed into the JR East network upon the privatization of the JNR on April 1, 1987.

== Passenger statistics ==
In fiscal 2018, the JR portion of the station was used by an average of 581 passengers daily (boarding passengers only).

== Surrounding area ==
- Kitaakita City Hall
- Kitaakita Culture Center
- Kitaakita City Library

== See also ==
- List of railway stations in Japan
