= Suzuki Matsuji =

Japanese matagi

- 鈴木 松治

Personal details
- Born: March 7, 1920 Uttō Village, Akita Prefecture, Empire of Japan
- Died: March 15, 2005 (aged 85) Kitaakita, Akita Prefecture, Japan

Suzuki Matsuji (Japanese: 鈴木 松治; 1920–2005) was a Japanese matagi.

== Biography ==
Suzuki was born on March 7, 1920, in the village of Uttō (打当), near Ani. In his village he was a shikari (しかり), a leader of hunting teams.

He was known for his mastery of the single-shot Murata rifle, and many of the bears he killed died from one shot to the head. As a result, he was sometimes called Headshot Matsu (頭撃ちの松, atamauchi no Matsu). When tracking bears in the mountains, Suzuki would often have to walk 30 to 40 kilometers in one day. About walking in the mountains, Suzuki reportedly said:

The mountains aren't something you can be taught about; you have to learn them on your own as you hike them [...] and learn with your body. Gaining experience [in this way] is what matters most. You also have to think for yourself.

In 1974, Suzuki traveled to the Himalaya Mountains as a member of the 2ⁿᵈ Himalayan Yeti Expedition Team (第二次ヒマラヤ雪男探検隊) led by Taniguchi Masahiko (谷口 正彦) of the Japanese Alpine Club.

In 1987, Suzuki provided instruction for Tamura Takahiro during production of the matagi film Itazu Kuma.

In his last years, Suzuki worked as a storyteller to preserve the heritage of Japan's ancient hunting culture and he was interviewed by anthropologists including Taguchi Hiromi. At one point, he also worked at the Ani Kuma Bokujō.

Suzuki died in 2005.

== See also ==
- Uttō Onsen
- Ōtaki Kuniyoshi

== Bibliography ==
- 長田 Nagata, 雅彦 Masahiko (2015). 朝日新聞秋田支局 Asahi Shinbun Akita Branch Office (ed.). 最後の狩人たち─阿仁マタギと羽後鷹匠 The Last Hunters – Ani Matagi and Ugo Falconers. Japan: 無明舎出版 Mumyōsha Shuppan. ISBN 489544452X.
