= Ani-Matagi Station =

Railway station in Kitaakita, Akita Prefecture, Japan

Ani-Matagi Station 阿仁マタギ駅
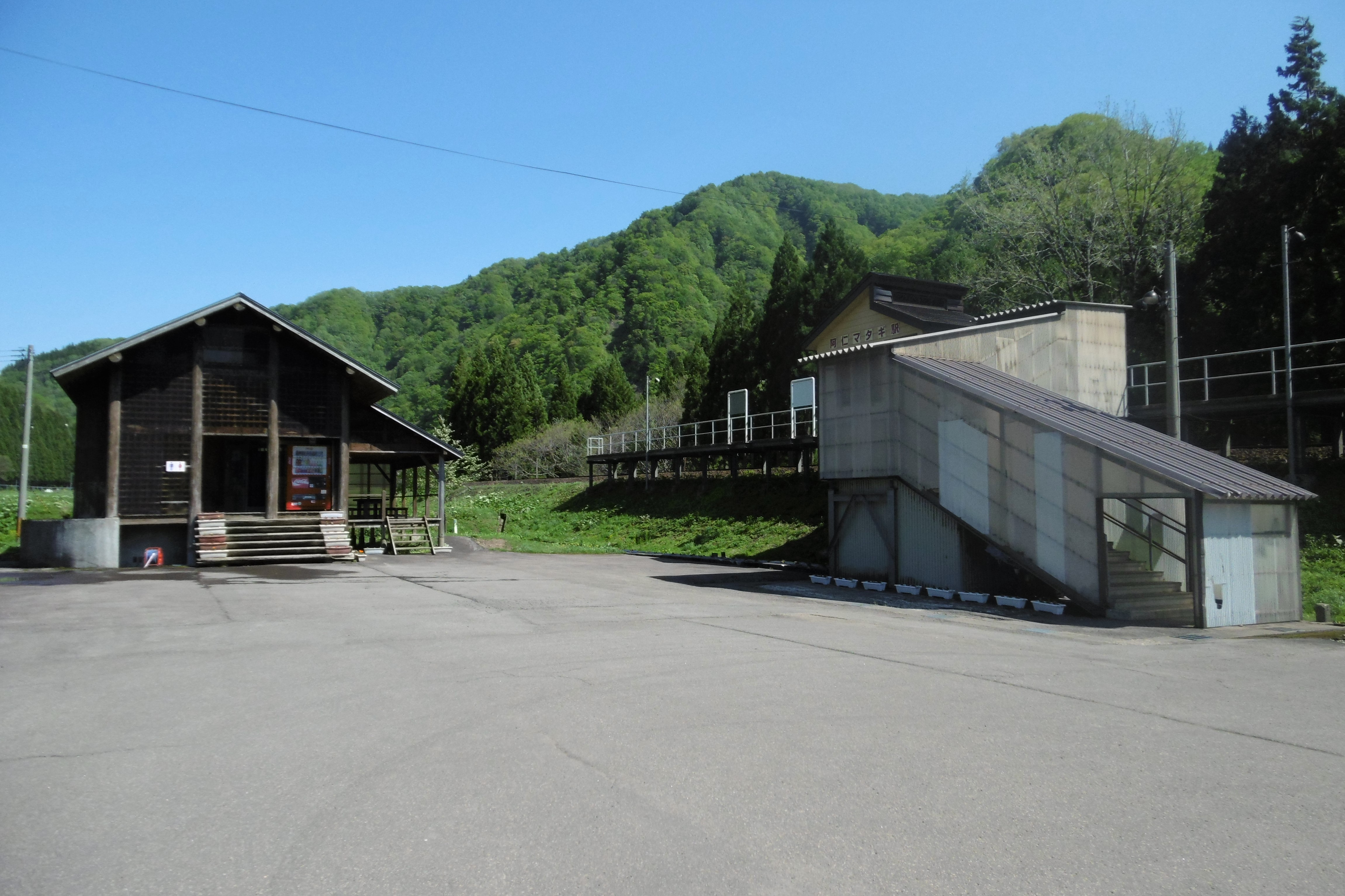
- Ani-Matagi Station, May 2018

General information
- Location: Aninakamura, Kitaakita-shi, Akita-ken 018-4732; Japan
- Coordinates: 39°55′10.45″N 140°30′56.52″E
- Operator: Akita Nariku Railway
- Line: ■ Nairiku Line
- Distance: 52.3 kilometers from Takanosu
- Platforms: 1 side platform

Other information
- Status: Unstaffed
- Website: Official website

History
- Opened: April 1, 1989
Location
- Location within Akita Prefecture Location within Japan

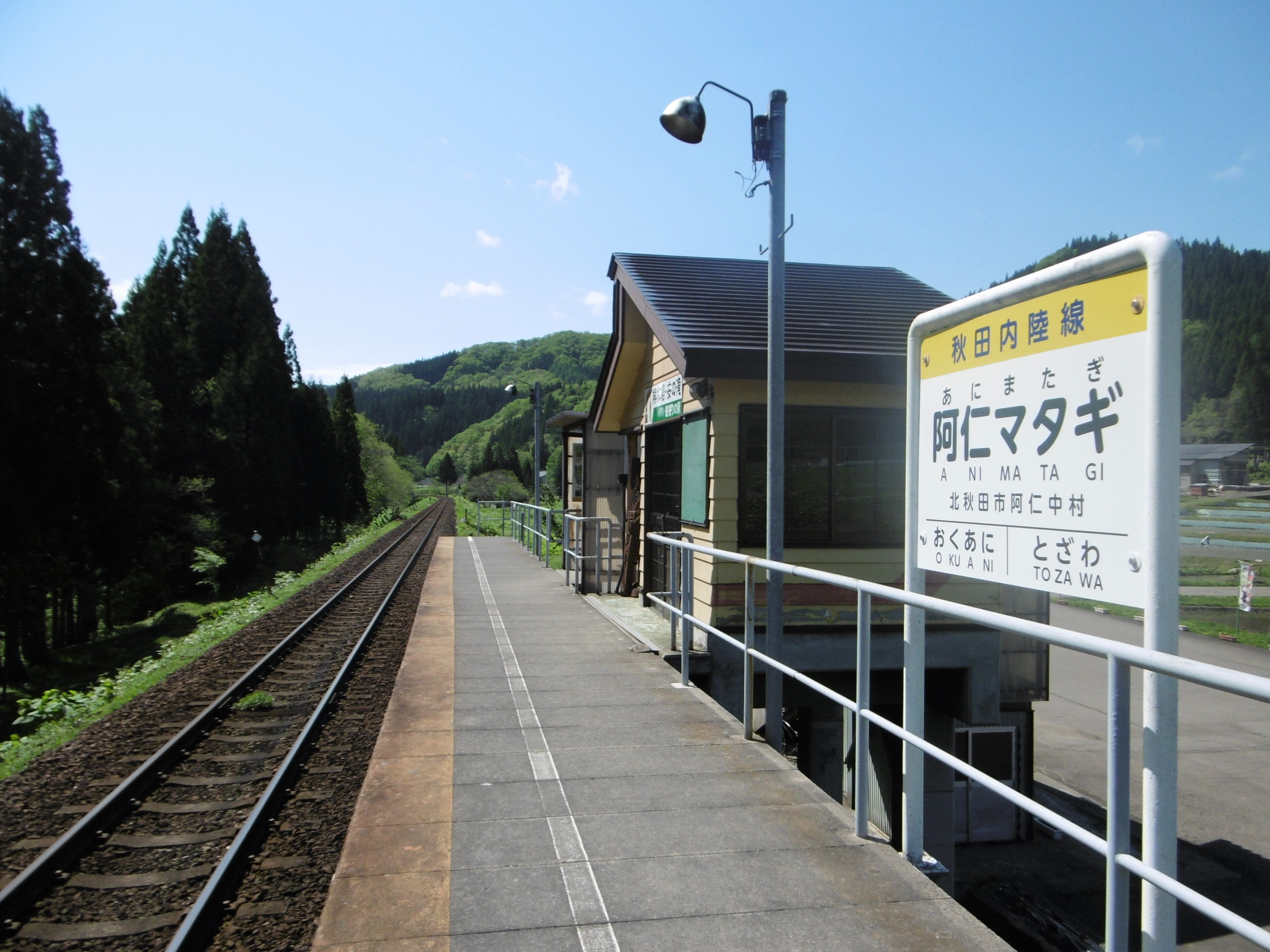
Platform

Ani-Matagi Station (阿仁マタギ駅, Ani-Matagi-eki) is a railway station located in the city of Kitaakita, Akita Prefecture, Japan, operated by the third sector railway operator Akita Nairiku Jūkan Railway.

== Lines ==
Ani-Matagi Station is served by the Nariku Line, and is located 52.3 km from the terminus of the line at Takanosu Station.

== Station layout ==
The station consists of one side platform serving a single bi-directional track. The station is unattended.

== Adjacent stations ==
| « | Service | » |
Akita Nairiku Jūkan Railway Akita Nairiku Line
Rapid: Does not stop at this station
| Okuani | - | Tozawa |

== History ==
Ani-Matagi Station opened on 1 April 1989, serving the town of Ani, Akita. The opening of the station coincided with the start of operations on the central section of the Nairiku Line between Matsuba and Hitachinai.

== Surrounding area ==
- Yasu Falls – One of Japan's Top 100 Waterfalls
