= 2021 Orix Buffaloes season =

2021 Orix Buffaloes
- Pacific League champions
- League: Pacific League
- Ballpark: Kyocera Dome Osaka/Hotto Motto Field Kobe
- Record: 70-55-18 (.560)
- League place: 1st
- Parent company: Orix
- Manager: Satoshi Nakajima

The 2021 Orix Buffaloes season was the 85th season of the franchise in Nippon Professional Baseball, their 17th season after their merger with the Osaka Kintetsu Buffaloes, and also their 17th season in Kyocera Dome Osaka. It was the Buffaloes' first season under new manager Satoshi Nakajima. For the first time since 1996 (or 2001 if one counts the history with the Kintetsu Buffaloes), the Buffaloes made the Japan Series, but lost to the Tokyo Yakult Swallows in 6 games.

== Regular season ==
After finishing in last place 2 years in a row, the Buffaloes managed to turn things around, going 70-55-18 for a .584 winning percentage. The Buffaloes also were the best at interleague, at 12–5–1, for a .761 win percentage in interleague.

=== Pacific League standings ===
2021 Pacific League standings
Pos	Team	GP	W	L	T	.Pct	GB	Home	Road
1	Orix Buffaloes	143	70	55	18	.560	—	38-22-12	32–33–6
2	Chiba Lotte Marines	143	67	57	19	.540	2½	33-32-7	34–25–12
3	Tohoku Rakuten Golden Eagles	143	66	62	15	.514	5½	31-33-8	35–29–7
4	Fukuoka SoftBank Hawks	143	60	62	21	.492	8½	31-29-11	29–33–10
5	Hokkaido Nippon-Ham Fighters	143	55	68	20	.447	14	25-36-10	30–32–10
6	Saitama Seibu Lions	143	55	70	18	.440	15	30-34-7	25–36–11
