= Nukazawa Station =

Railway station in Kitaakita, Akita Prefecture, Japan

Nukazawa Station 糠沢駅
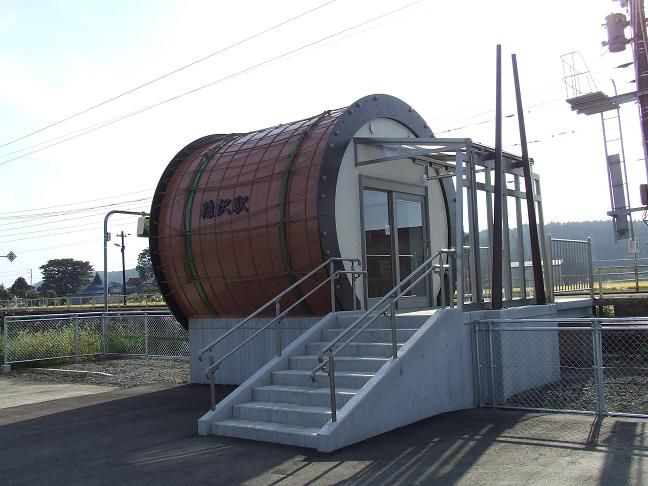
- Nukazawa Station (Sep 27, 2009)

General information
- Location: 350 Shitayachi Tsuzureko, Kitaakita-shi, Akita-ken 018-3301; Japan
- Coordinates: 40°15′3.93″N 140°23′52.17″E
- Operator: JR East
- Line: ■ Ōu Main Line
- Distance: 388.1 kilometers from Fukushima
- Platforms: 2 side platforms

Other information
- Status: Unstaffed
- Website: Official website

History
- Opened: December 3, 1956

Services
| Preceding station | JR East | Following station |
|---|---|---|
| Takanosu towards Shinjō | Ōu Main Line Local | Hayaguchi towards Aomori |
Location
- Location within Akita Prefecture Location within Japan

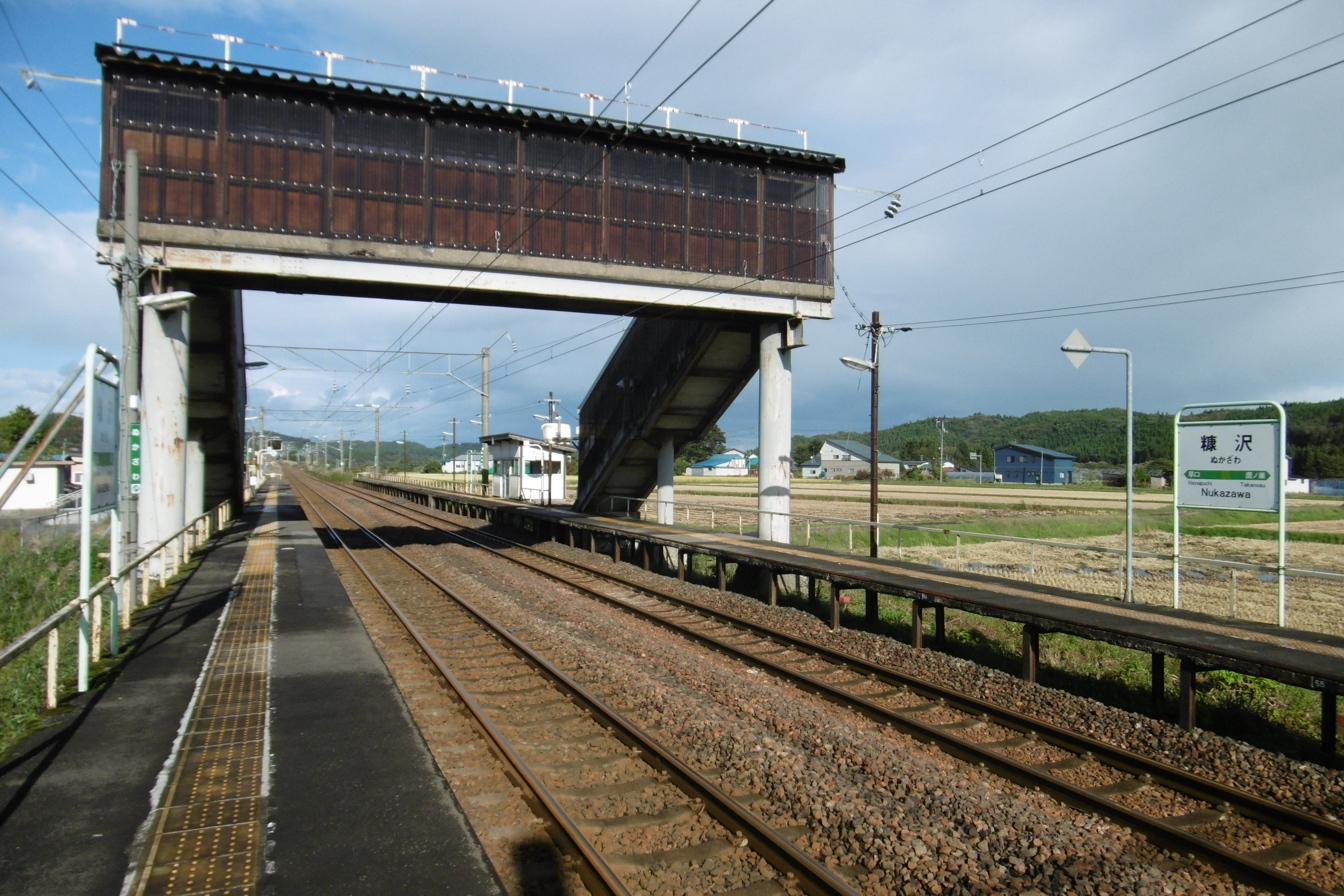
Platforms and footbridge

Nukazawa Station (糠沢駅, Nukazawa-eki) is a JR East railway station located in the city of Kitaakita, Akita Prefecture, Japan.

== Lines ==
Nukazawa Station is served by the Ōu Main Line, and is located 388.1 km from the terminus of the line at Fukushima Station.

== Station layout ==
The station consists of a two opposed side platforms serving two tracks, connected to the station building by a footbridge. The station is unattended.

=== Platforms ===
| 1 | ■ Ōu Main Line | for Ōdate and Hirosaki |
| 2 | ■ Ōu Main Line | for Higashi-Noshiro and Akita |

== History ==
Nukazawa Station was opened on December 3, 1956 on the Japan National Railways (JNR) serving the town of Takanosu, Akita. The station was absorbed into the JR East network upon the privatization of the JNR on April 1, 1987.

== Surrounding area ==
- National Route 7
- Nukazawa Jinja
