= Moriyoshi =

Moriyoshi may refer to:

- Prince Moriyoshi, Japanese prince and monk
- Moriyoshi, Akita, a town located in Kitaakita District, Akita Prefecture, Japan
- Moriyoshi Express, a railway service provided by Akita Nairiku Line
