= Aikawa Station (Akita) =

Railway station in Kitaakita, Akita Prefecture, Japan

Aikawa Station 合川駅
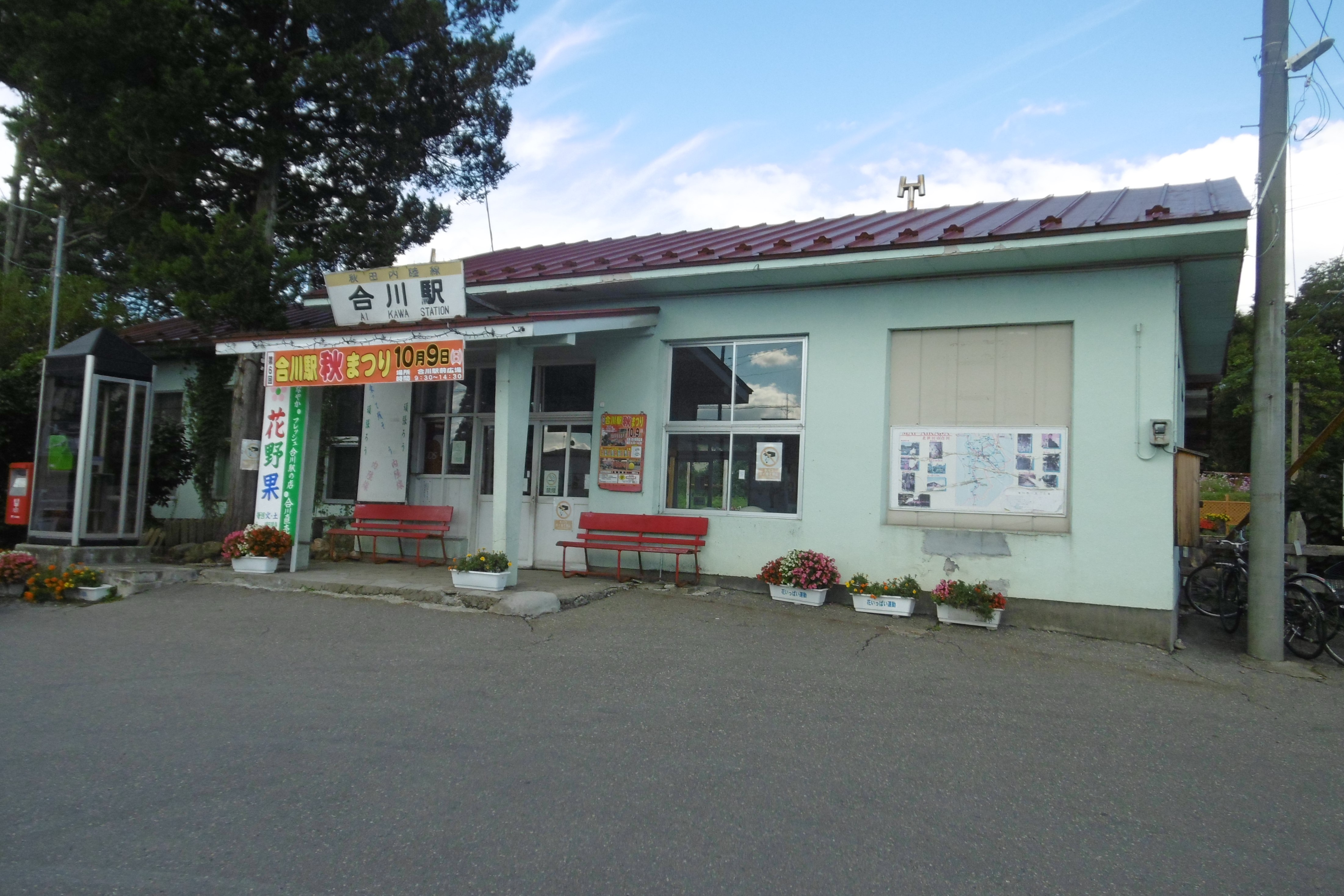
- Aikawa Station, October 2016

General information
- Location: Kawaizakai Shimosugi, Kitaakita-shi, Akita-ken; Japan
- Coordinates: 40°09′39.77″N 140°19′48.62″E
- Operator: Akita Nariku Railway
- Line: ■ Nairiku Line
- Distance: 9.7 kilometers from Takanosu
- Platforms: 1 island platform

Other information
- Status: Unstaffed
- Website: Official website

History
- Opened: December 10, 1934
- Former names: Ugo-Kamiōno (to 1956)

Passengers
- FY2016: 55
Location
- Location within Akita Prefecture Location within Japan

Aikawa Station (合川駅, Aikawa-eki) is a railway station located in the city of Kitaakita, Akita Prefecture, Japan, operated by the third sector railway operator Akita Nairiku Jūkan Railway.

== Lines ==
Aikawa Station is served by the Nariku Line, and is located 9.7 km from the terminus of the line at Takanosu Station.

== Station layout ==
The station consists of one island platform connected to the station building by a level crossing. The station is unattended.

=== Platforms ===
1	■ Akita Nairiku Jūkan Railway Akita Nairiku Line	for Takanosu
2	■ Akita Nairiku Jūkan Railway Akita Nairiku Line	for Kakunodate

== Adjacent stations ==
«	Service	»
Akita Nairiku Jūkan Railway Akita Nairiku Line
Takanosu	Express Moriyoshi	Yonaizawa
Ōnodai	-	Kamisugi

== History ==
Aikawa Station opened on December 10, 1934, as Ugo-Kamiōno Station (羽後上大野駅, Ugo-Kamiōno) on the Japan National Railways (JNR) serving the village of Ōno, Akita. The line was extended on to Aniai Station by September 25, 1936. The station was renamed to its present name on April 1, 1956. The line was privatized on 1 November 1986, becoming the Akita Nairiku Jūkan Railway.

== Surrounding area ==
- Aikawa Post Office
- former Aikawa Town Hall
