= Kitaakita District, Akita =

District in Akita prefecture, Japan

Coordinates: 39.960°N 140.321°E

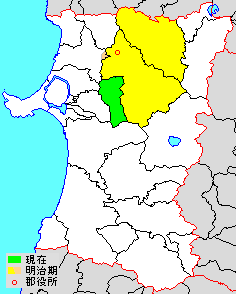
Map showing original extent of Kitaakita District in Akita Prefecture green - current yellow - former extent in early Meiji period: 1. Odate; 2. Kitaakita

Kitaakita District (北秋田郡, Kitaakita-gun) is a rural district located in Akita Prefecture, Japan.

As of April 2022, the district consists of only the village of Kamikoani with an estimated population of 2,089 and an area of 256.82 km^{2}. All of the cities of Kitaakita and Ōdate, and part of the city of Noshiro were formerly part of Kitaakita District.

== Towns and villages ==
- Kamikoani

== History ==
The area of Kitaakita District was formerly part of Akita District [ja], Dewa Province. Dewa Province was divided into the provinces of Ugo Province and Uzen Province following the Meiji restoration on January 19, 1869, with the area of Kitaakita becoming part of Ugo Province. At the time, the area consisted of two towns (Ōdate and Junishō) and 117 villages formerly under the control of Kubota Domain. Akita Prefecture was founded on December 13, 1871.

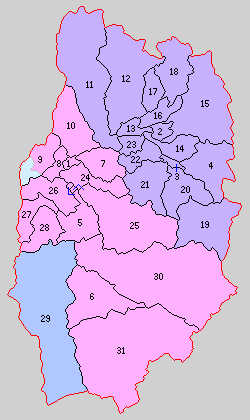
Historic Map of Kitaakita District: Purple - Ōdate-shi: 2. Ōdate; 3. Ogita; 4. Junishō; 11. Hayaguchi; 12. Yamase; 13. Shimokawasoe; 14. Kamikawasoe; 15. Nagaki; 16. Shakanai; 17. Hanaoka; 18. Yatate; 19. Ōkuzo; 20. Higashidate; 21. Nishidate; 22. Niida; 23. Manaka; Light Blue - part of Noshiro-shi: 9. Nanakura (southwest portion); Pink - Kitaakiya-shi: 1. Takanosu; 5. Yonaizawa; 6. Aniai; 7. Sakae; 8. Bōsawa; 9. Nanakura (northeast portion); 10. Tsuzureko; 24. Sawaguchi; 25. Nanukaichi; 26. Ōno; 27. Ochiai; 28. Shimokoani; 30. Maeda; 31. Arasei; Blue - Kamikoani-mura: 29. Kamikoani

== History ==
With the establishment of the municipality system on April 1, 1889, modern Kitaakita District, with two towns (Ōdate and Junishō) and 29 villages was established.

- 1896 - Ogita was elevated to town status.
- 1897 - Aniai was elevated to town status.
- 1900 - Takanosu was elevated to town status.
- 1902 - Yonaizawa was elevated to town status.
- 1932 - Hanaoka was elevated to town status.
- 1947 - Hayaguchi was elevated to town status.
- 1951 - Ōdate was elevated to city status.
- 1955 - Hanaoka was renamed Hanaya, Ogita was renamed Hinai, the town of Aikawa was established by the consolidation of four villages, and the town of Junisho was merged into Ōdate.
- 1956 - Hayaguchi was renamed Tashiro, and Yonaizawa became Moriyoshi.
- 1967 - The town of Hanaya was absorbed into Ōdate.
- On March 22, 2005 - the towns of Aikawa, Ani, Moriyoshi and Takanosu were merged to create the city of Kitaakita.
- On June 20, 2005 - the towns of Hinai and Tashiro were merged into the expanded city of Ōdate. Following this merger, Kitaakita District was left with only the village of Kamikoani.
