= Hinai, Akita =

Dissolved municipality in Akita prefecture, Japan

Hinai (比内町, Hinai-machi) was a town located in Kitaakita District, Akita Prefecture, Japan.

== History ==
The name is believed to be a Japanized form of Pi-nay, the Ainu language term for 'pebble river’.

In 2003, the town had an estimated population of 11,665 and a density of 56.79 persons per km^{2}. The total area was 205.39 km^{2}.

On June 20, 2005, Hinai, along with the town of Tashiro (also from Kitaakita District), was merged into the expanded city of Ōdate.
