= Satoshi Nakajima =

Japanese baseball player and coach

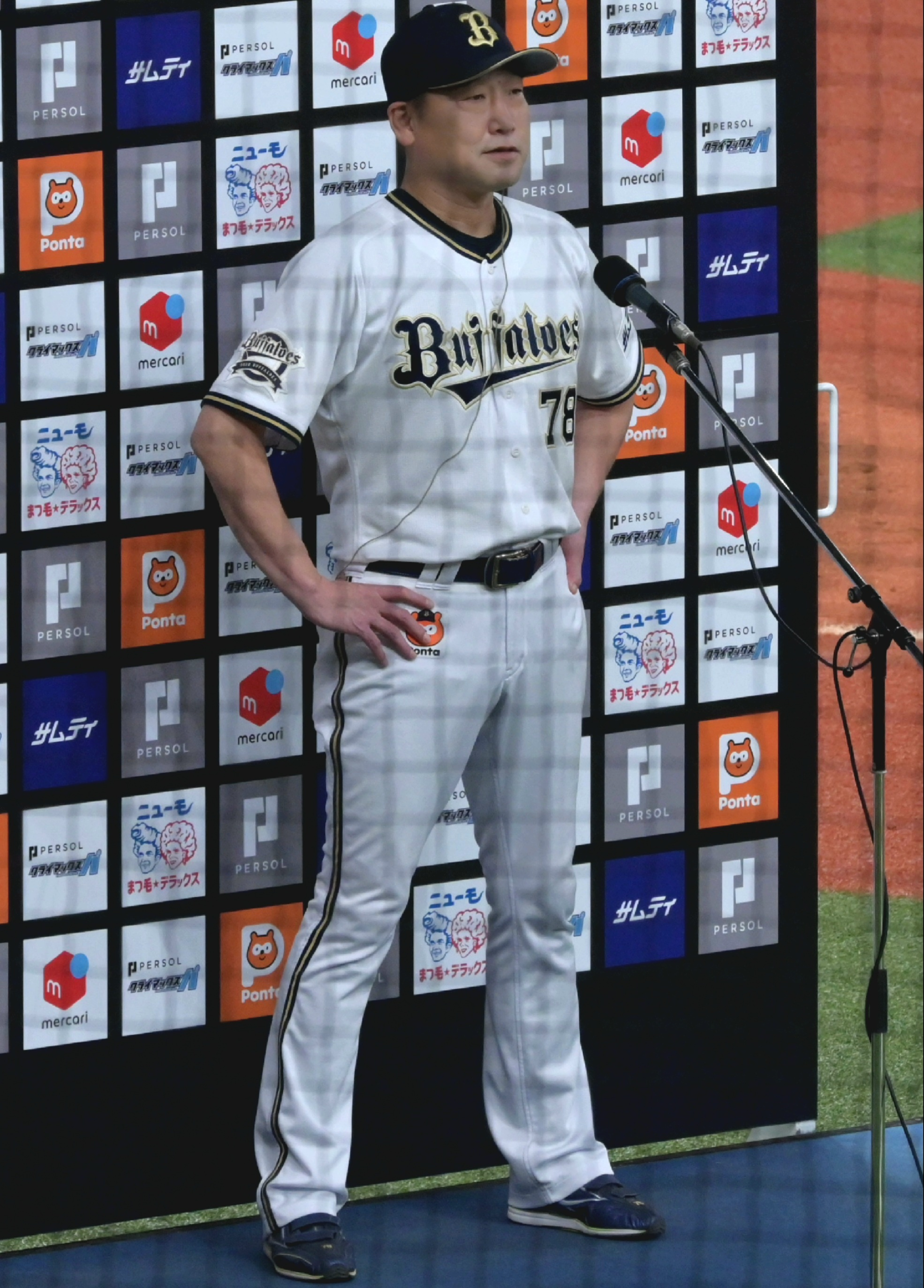
- Nakajima with the Orix Buffaloes
- Catcher/Coach/Manager
- Born: March 27, 1969 (age 56); Takanosu, (present day of Kitaakita), Akita Prefecture, Japan
- Batted: Right Threw: Right

debut
- October 18, 1987, for the Hankyu Braves

Last appearance
- August 10, 2015, for the Hokkaido Nippon-Ham Fighters

NPB statistics
- Batting average: .232
- Hits: 804
- Runs batted in: 349
- Stolen Bases: 27
- Home runs: 55
- Stats at Baseball Reference

Teams
- As player: Hankyu Braves/Orix Braves/Orix BlueWave (1987–1997); Seibu Lions (1998–2002); Yokohama BayStars (2003); Hokkaido Nippon-Ham Fighters (2004–2015); As manager: Orix Buffaloes (2020–2024); As coach: Hokkaido Nippon-Ham Fighters (2007–2015, 2018); Orix Buffaloes (2019–2020)

Career highlights and awards
- 1× Pacific League Best Nine Award (1995); 1× Pacific League Golden Glove Award (1989); 6× NPB All-Star (1989, 1990, 1991, 1995, 1996, 1999); 3× Japan Series champion (1996, 2006, 2022); Matsutaro Shoriki Award (2022)

Satoshi Nakajima (中嶋 聡, Nakajima Satoshi; born March 27, 1969) is a Japanese former professional baseball catcher. He played in Nippon Professional Baseball (NPB) from 1987 to 2015 for the Hankyu Braves/Orix Braves/Orix BlueWave, Seibu Lions, Yokohama BayStars, and Hokkaido Nippon-Ham Fighters.

== Career ==
Nakajima became the manager for the Buffaloes in 2020, replacing Norifumi Nishimura, and led the team to two consecutive Pacific League pennants and two Japan Series appearances, before winning in 2022. His efforts to help turn around the Buffaloes from an low-rated team to a Japan Series champion gave him the Matsutaro Shoriki Award in 2022. However, he stepped down October 6, 2024, he announced he was stepping down as manager after he failed to lead the Buffaloes to a 4th straight pennant and a 5th place finish.

== Awards ==
- Best Nine Award: (1995)
- Golden Glove Award: (1989)
- Shoriki Award: (2022)
- Monthly MVP: (June 1991)
- Best Battery Award: 1 time (1995)
- Pacific League Association Special Award:(B2021, 2022, 2023)

{Source:Nippon Professional Baseball}
