= Aikawa, Akita =

Aikawa 合川町
- Former municipality
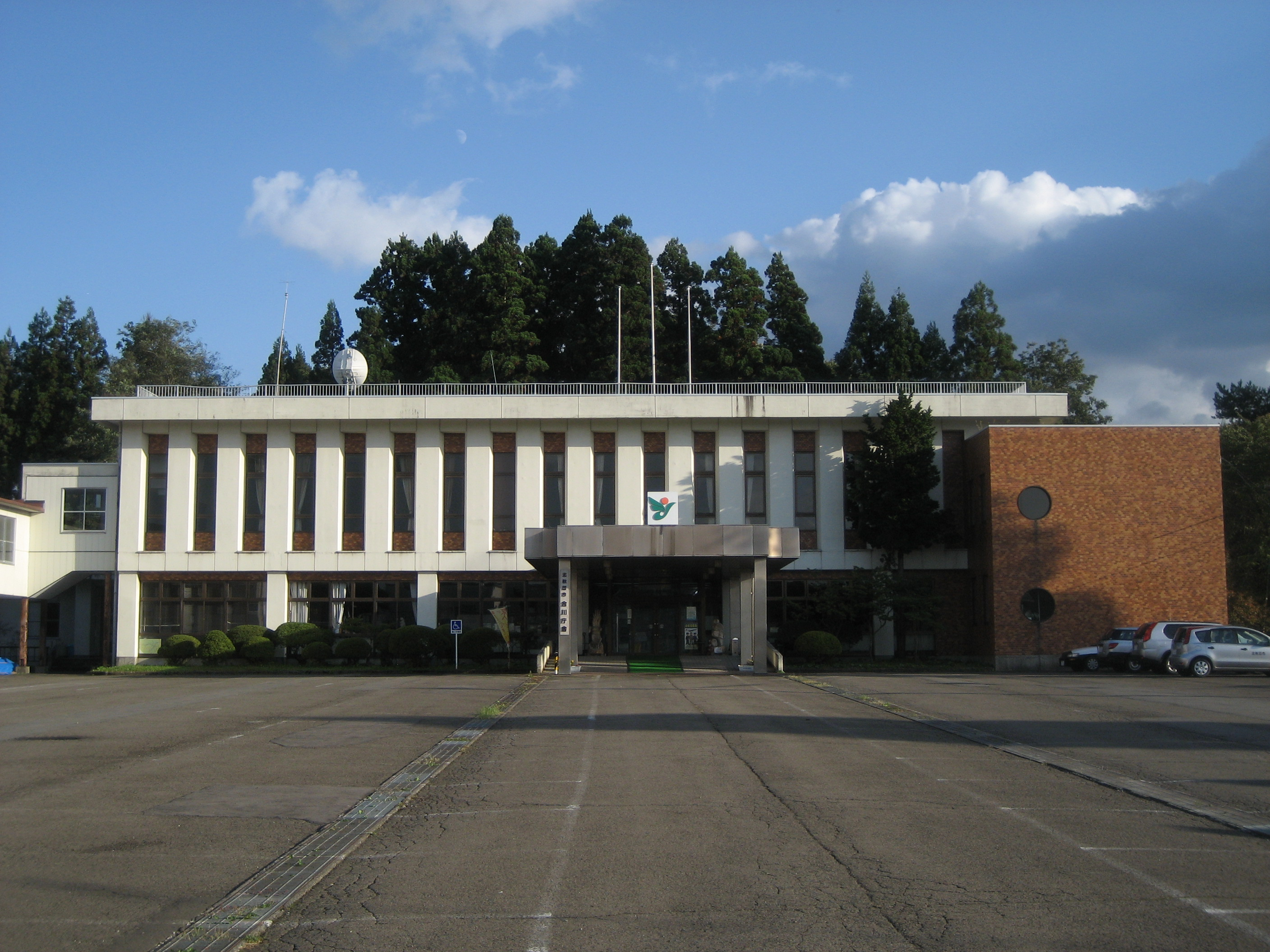
- Aikawa Town Hall

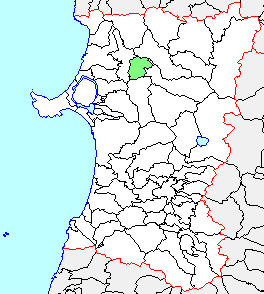
- Location of Aikawa in Akita

- Location in Japan
- Coordinates: 40°09′32.7″N 140°19′44.3″E
- Country: Japan
- Region: Tōhoku
- Prefecture: Akita
- District: Kitaakita
- Merged: March 22, 2005 (now part of Kitaakita, Akita)

Area
  - Total: 112.8 km^{2} (43.6 sq mi)

Population (March 1, 2005)
  - Total: 7,550
- Time zone: UTC+09:00 (JST)
- Symbols
- Flower: Prunus mume

Aikawa (合川町, Aikawa-machi) was a town located in Kitaakita District, Akita Prefecture, Japan.

As of March 1, 2005, the town had an estimated population of 7,550 and a density of 66.9 persons per km^{2}. The total area was 112.8 km^{2}.

== History ==
Aikawa was established on March 31, 1955, through the merger of the villages of Ochiai, Shimokoani, Kami-Ono and Shimo-Ono.

On March 22, 2005, Aikawa, along with the towns of Ani, Moriyoshi and Takanosu (all from Kitaakita District) merged to create the city of Kitaakita.

The town was served by the Japanese National Railways Aniai Line and Japan National Route 285.
