= Tashiro, Akita =

Dissolved municipality in Akita prefecture, Japan

Tashiro (田代町, Tashiro-machi) was a town located in Kitaakita District, Akita Prefecture, Japan.

In 2003, the town had an estimated population of 7,590 and a density of 24.74 persons per km^{2}. The total area was 306.77 km^{2}.

On June 20, 2005, Tashiro, along with the town of Hinai (also from Kitaakita District), was merged into the expanded city of Ōdate.
