= Odate–Noshiro Airport =

Odate–Noshiro Airport 大館能代空港
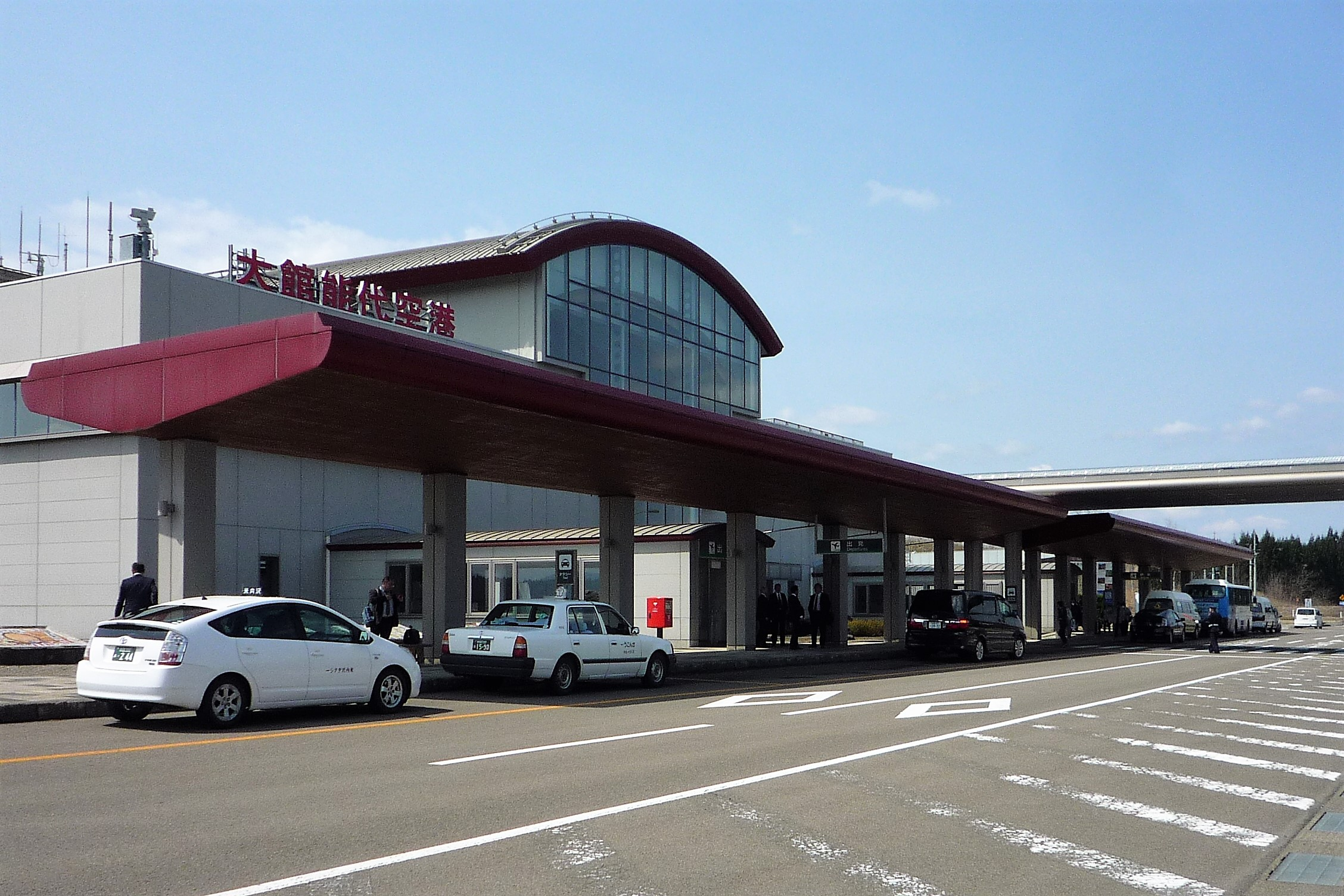
- IATA: ONJ; ICAO: RJSR

Summary
- Airport type: Public
- Operator: Odate–Noshiro Airport Administration
- Serves: Kitaakita, Ōdate, Noshiro, Kazuno, Aomori Prefecture
- Location: Kitaakita, Akita, Japan
- Elevation AMSL: 276 ft (84 m)
- Coordinates: 40°11′31″N 140°22′18″E
- Website: https://onj-airterminal.com/

Map
- Location in Japan RJSR (Japan)

Runways
Direction	Length		Surface
Direction	m	ft	Surface
11/29	2,000	6,562	Asphalt concrete

Statistics (2015)
- Passengers: 125,496
- Cargo (metric tonnes): 65
- Aircraft movement: 1,575
- Source: Japanese Ministry of Land, Infrastructure, Transport and Tourism

Odate–Noshiro Airport (大館能代空港, Ōdate-Noshiro Kūkō) (IATA: ONJ, ICAO: RJSR) is an airport in Kitaakita, Akita Prefecture, Japan and is 15.4 km (9.6 mi) west of Ōdate, at 84 m (276 ft) above sea level. It is also informally known as Akita North Airport (あきた北空港 Akita Kita Kūkō).

== History ==
Efforts to build an airport in northern Akita Prefecture began in the late 1980s. The airport site was decided in April 1989, and construction began in 1994.

Odate–Noshiro Airport opened on 18 July 1998, with Air Nippon services to Tokyo Haneda Airport and Osaka Itami Airport, and seasonal service to Sapporo New Chitose Airport. Services to Sapporo were discontinued in November 1999 followed by services to Osaka in May 2010. From January 2011, charter flight operations began to Taiwan's Taiwan Taoyuan International Airport.

The airport is located in northern Akita Prefecture, primarily serving the city of Noshiro and the surrounding region, which includes tourist destinations such as Shirakami-Sanchi, Lake Towada, and Towada-Hachimantai National Park. The airport terminal building makes extensive use of the local Akita cedar wood. However, the low local population density and competition from the Akita Shinkansen and its proximity to the nearby Aomori Airport have limited profitable airline operations.

== Facilities ==
The airport has a single, three-story terminal building with one boarding gate. The unsecured part of the terminal building also functions as a roadside station, a government-designated rest area along Akita Prefecture Route 324.

== Airlines and destinations ==
Airlines	Destinations
All Nippon Airways	Tokyo–Haneda

== Ground transportation ==
Scheduled ground transportation is provided by Shuhoku Bus Group, which operates two daily "limousine bus" services to hotels in Odate City. Taxi and rental car service is also available.
