= Mount Moriyoshi =

Mountain in Japan

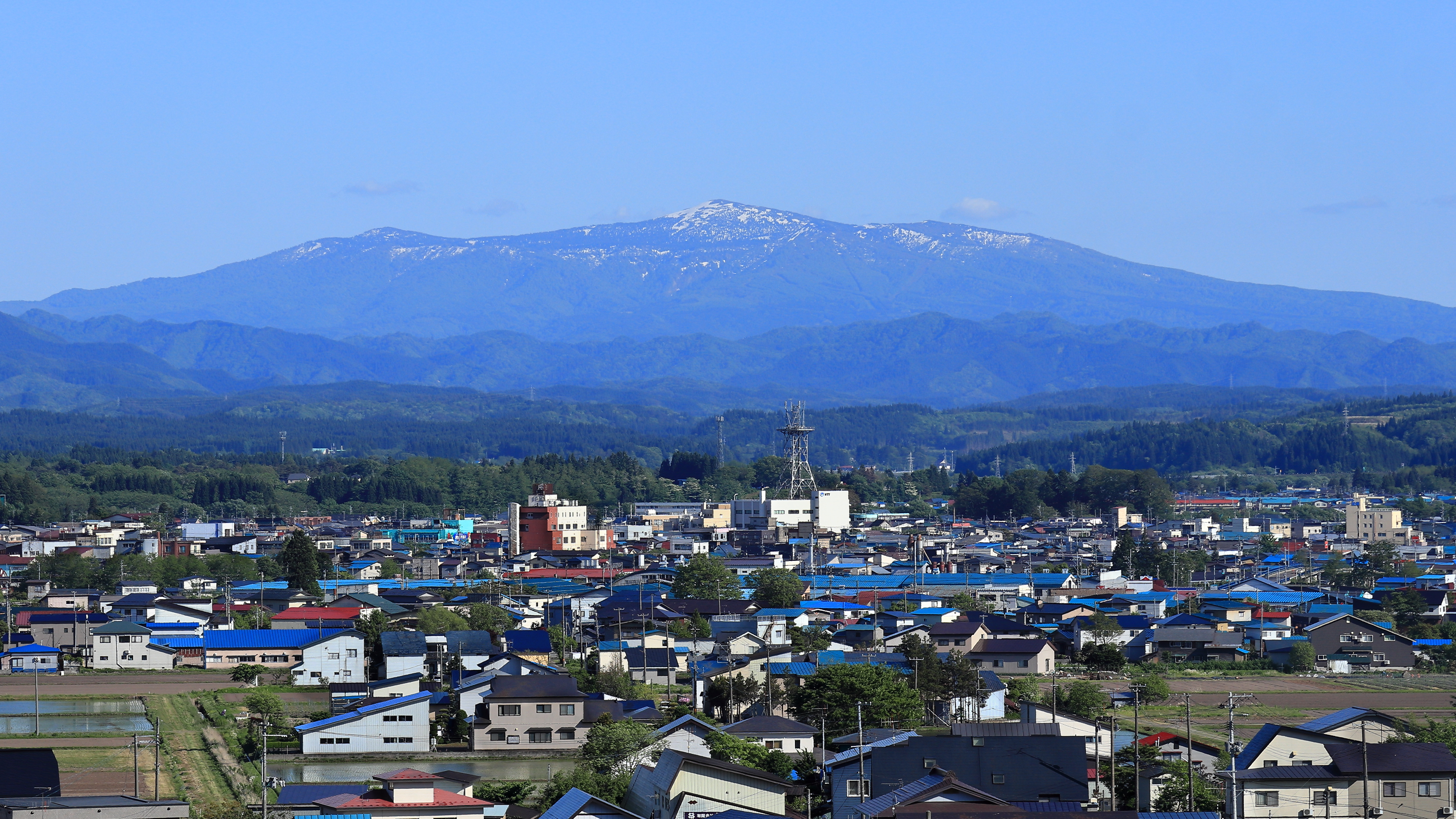
- Viewed from Tsuzureko

Highest point
- Elevation: 4,770 ft (1,450 m)
- Listing: Volcanoes in Japan
- Coordinates: 39°58′26″N 140°32′49″E

Geography
- Location within Japan
- Location: Akita Prefecture

Geology
- Mountain type: Stratovolcano
- Last eruption: Pleistocene

Mount Moriyoshi is an inactive volcano in Kitaakita, Akita Prefecture, Japan. The stratovolcano is basaltic-to-dacitic in composition. Its last eruptive activity is thought to be 1.1 million to 700 thousand years ago. The volcano appeared in the List of 100 Floral Mountains. The volcano contains about 300 species of alpine flora which has made it a tourist attraction.

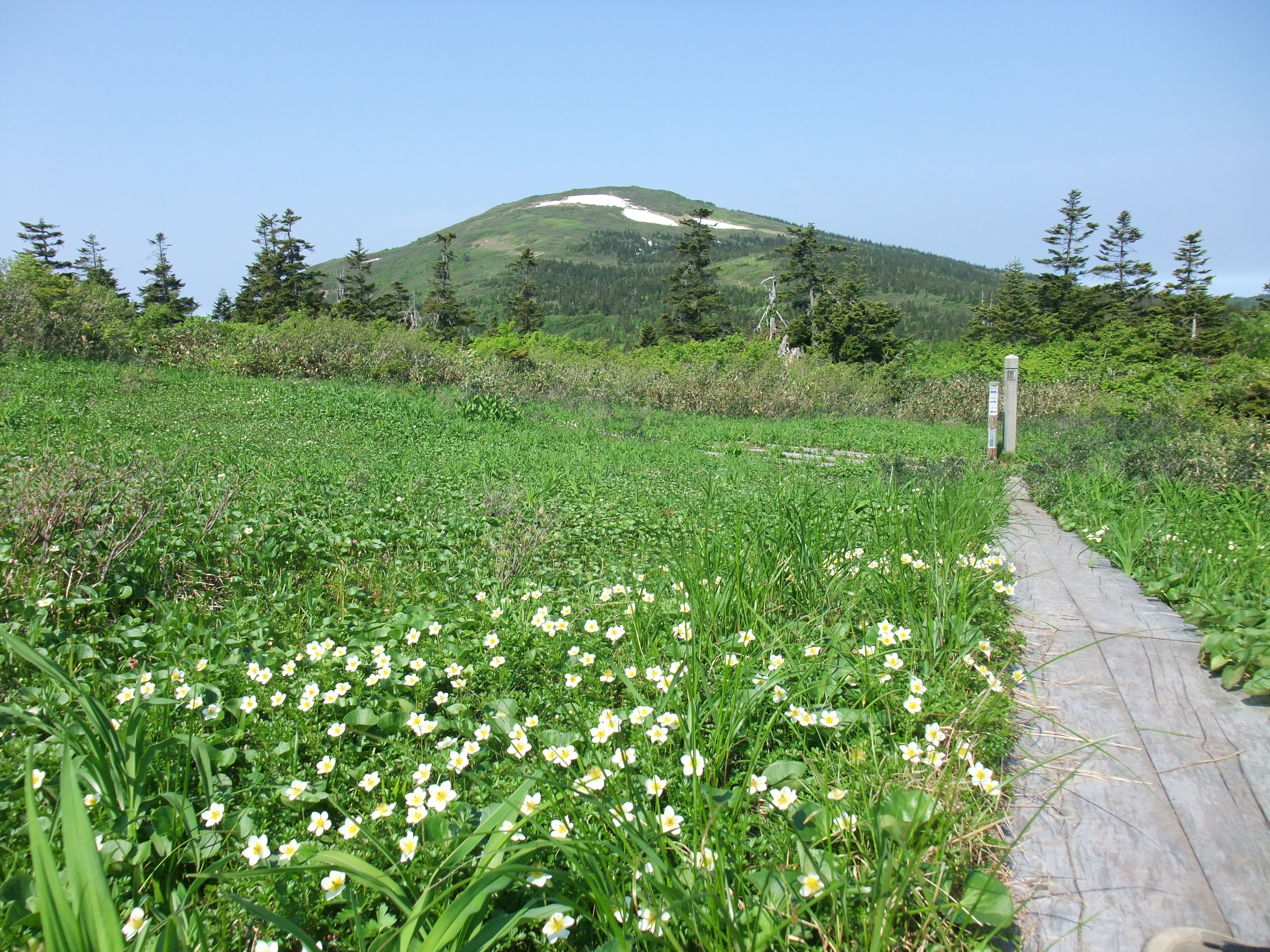
Mount Moriyoshi from the Hibakura Junction

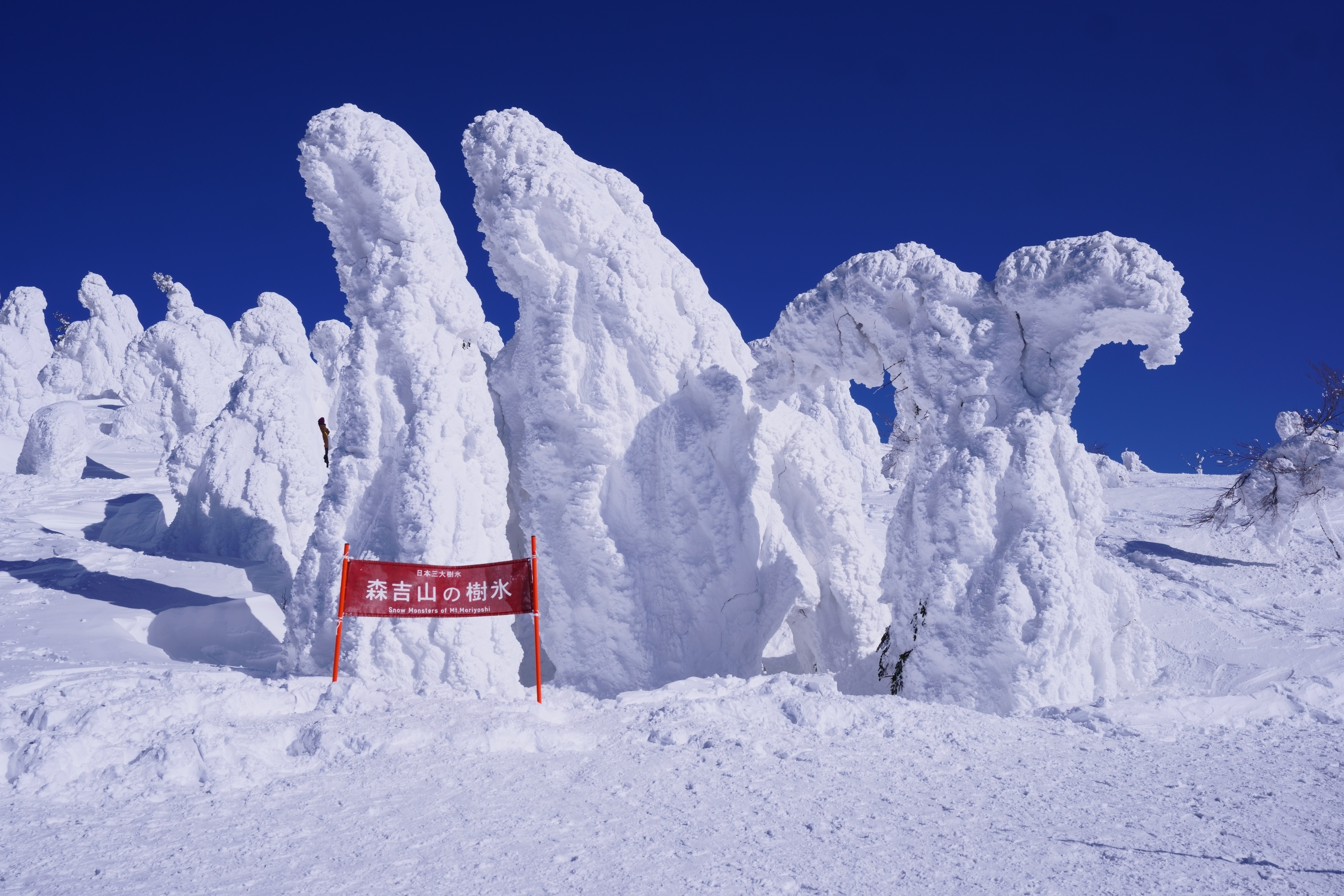
Snow monsters

== See also ==
- List of volcanoes in Japan
- List of mountains in Japan
