= Moriyoshi, Akita =

Dissolved municipality in Akita prefecture, Japan

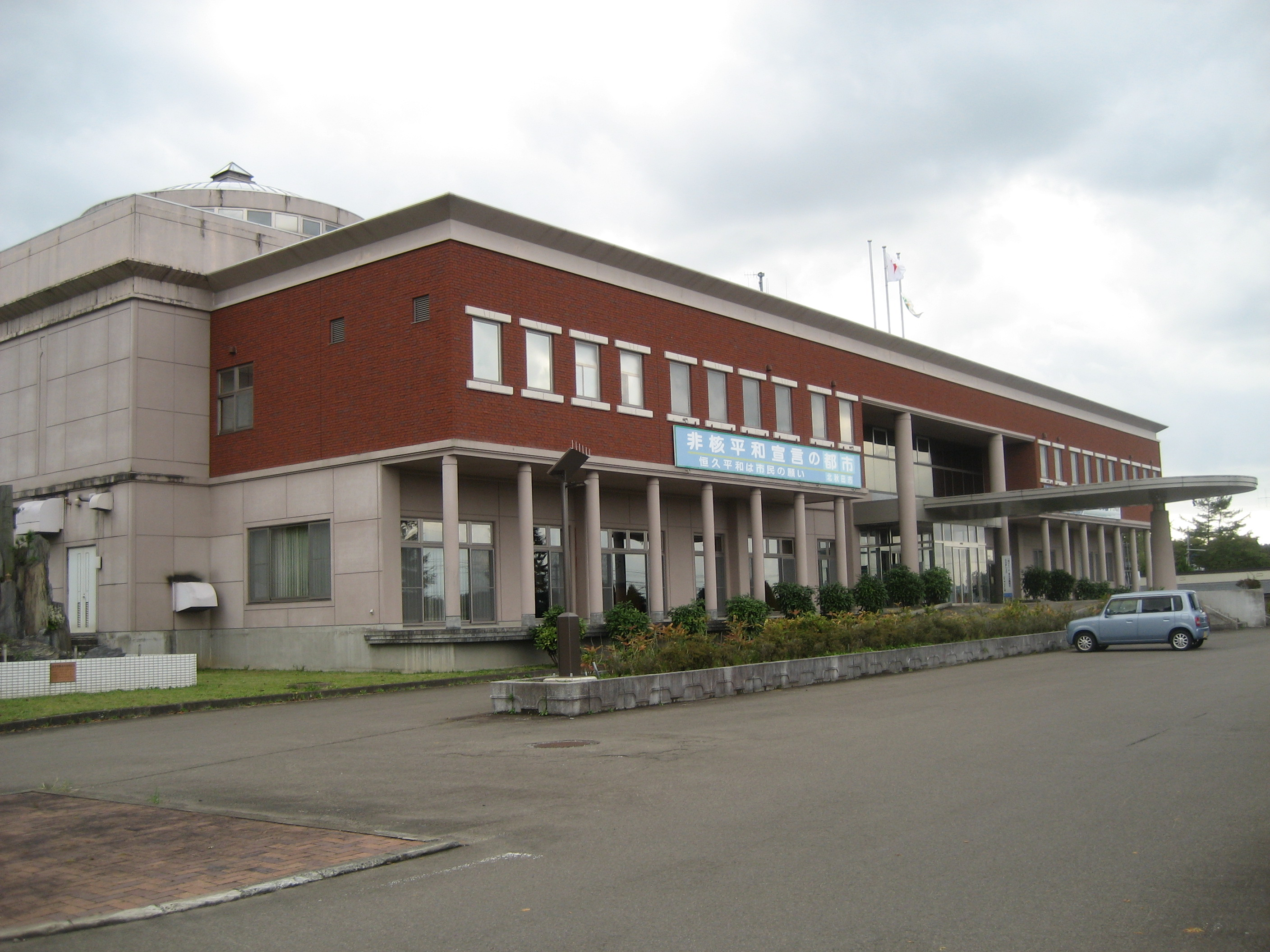
Moriyoshi Town Hall

Moriyoshi (森吉町, Moriyoshi-machi) was a town located in Kitaakita District, Akita Prefecture, Japan.

In 2003, the town had an estimated population of 7,471 and a population density of 21.85 per square kilometre (56.6/sq mi). The total area was 341.88 square kilometres (132.00 sq mi).

On March 22, 2005, Moriyoshi, along with the towns of Aikawa, Ani and Takanosu (all from Kitaakita District), merged to create the city of Kitaakita.
