= Yasu Falls =

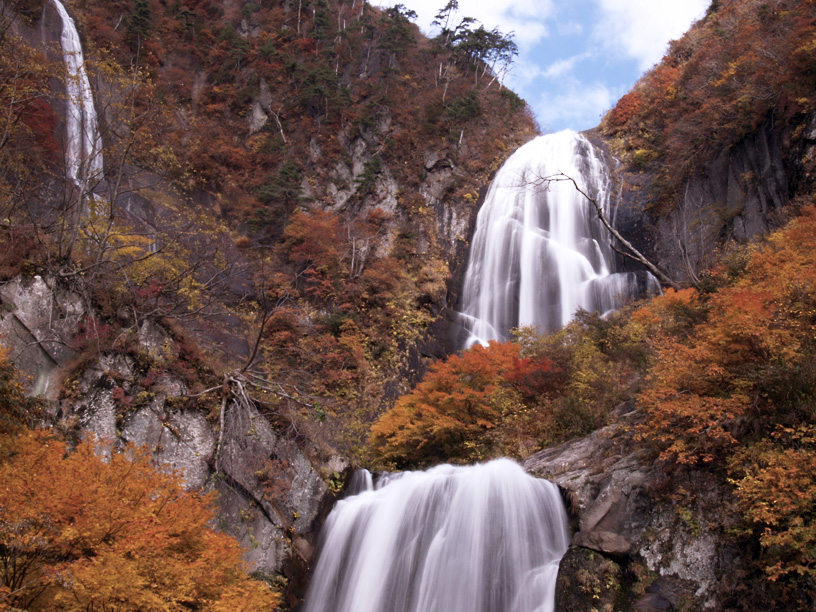

- Location within Japan
- Location: Kitaakika, Akita Prefecture, Japan
- Coordinates: 39°56′38.8″N 140°36′50.1″E
- Type: multi-step
- Total height: 90 m (300 ft)
- Number of drops: 2
- Longest drop: 60 m (200 ft)
- Watercourse: Yoneshiro River

Yasu Falls (安の滝, Yasu-no-taki) is a waterfall in the Ani district of Kitaakika, Akita Prefecture, Japan, on the Yoneshiro River. It was named one of Japan's Top 100 Waterfalls by the Japanese Ministry of the Environment in 1990.

The falls are in two levels: the main drop of 60 metres (200 ft) on the upper level and a smaller drop of 30 metres (100 ft) on the lower level. Between levels is the basin of the first waterfall, which is a wide space than can be hiked to easily.
