= Kitaakita =

Kitaakita 北秋田市
- City
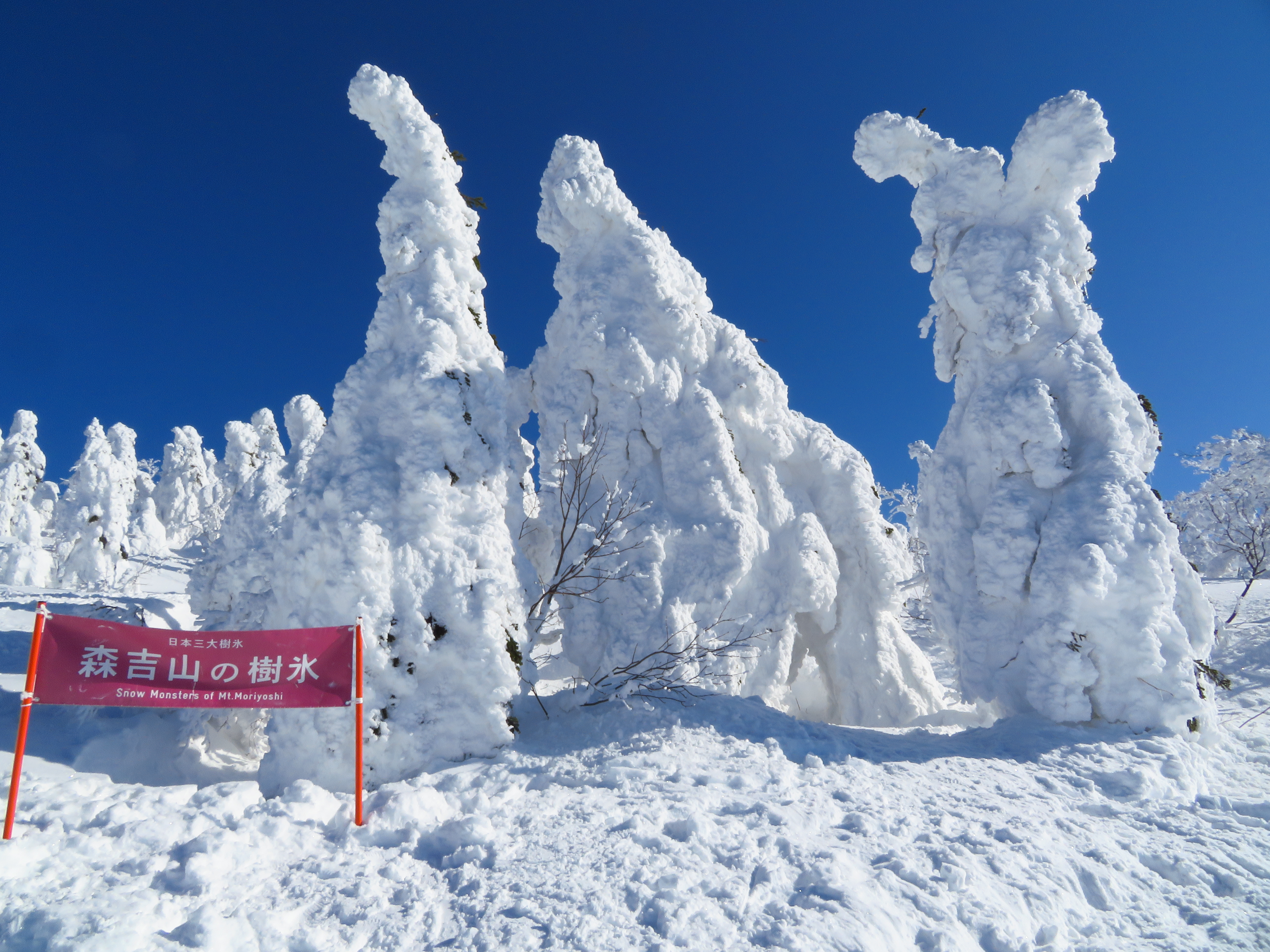

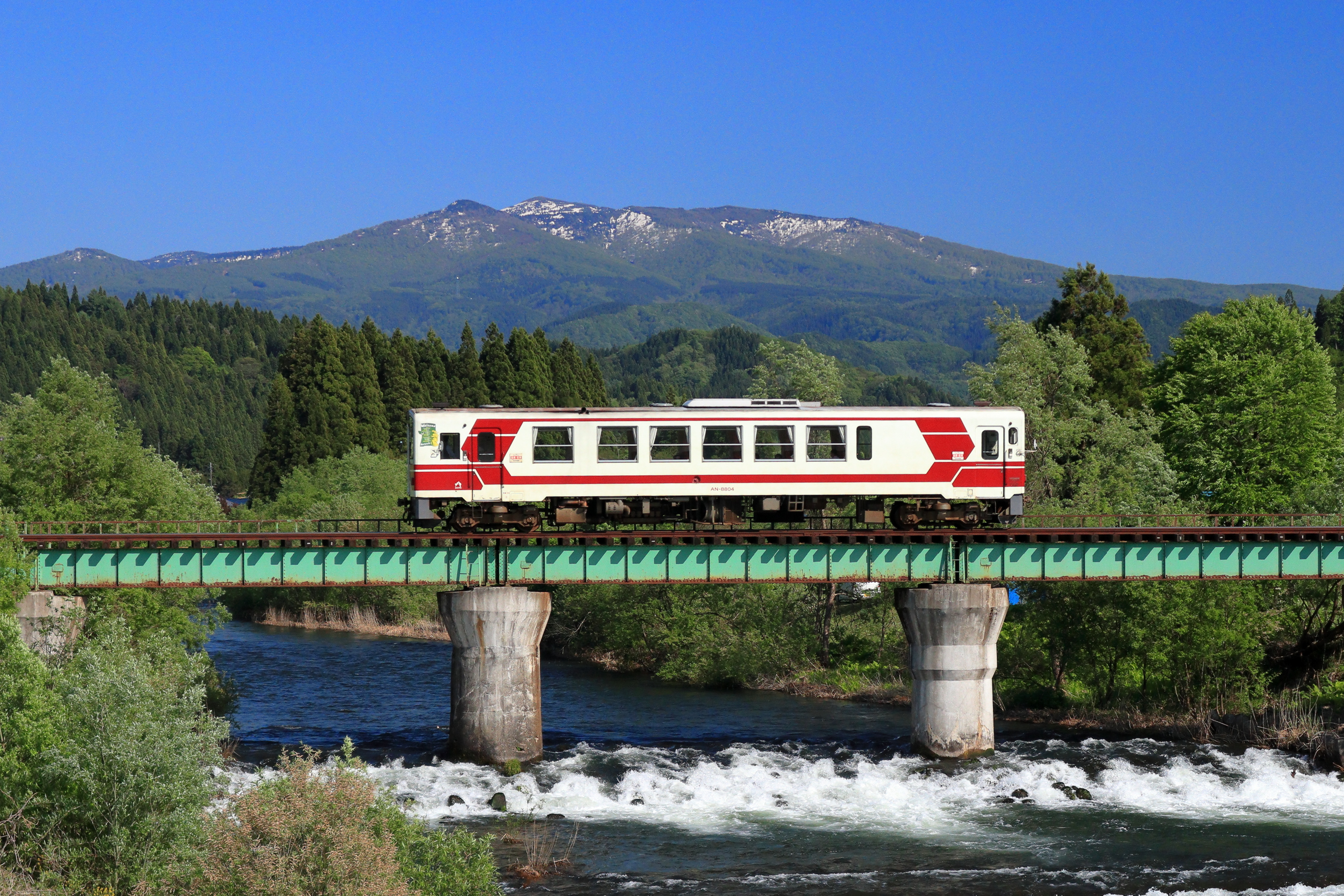

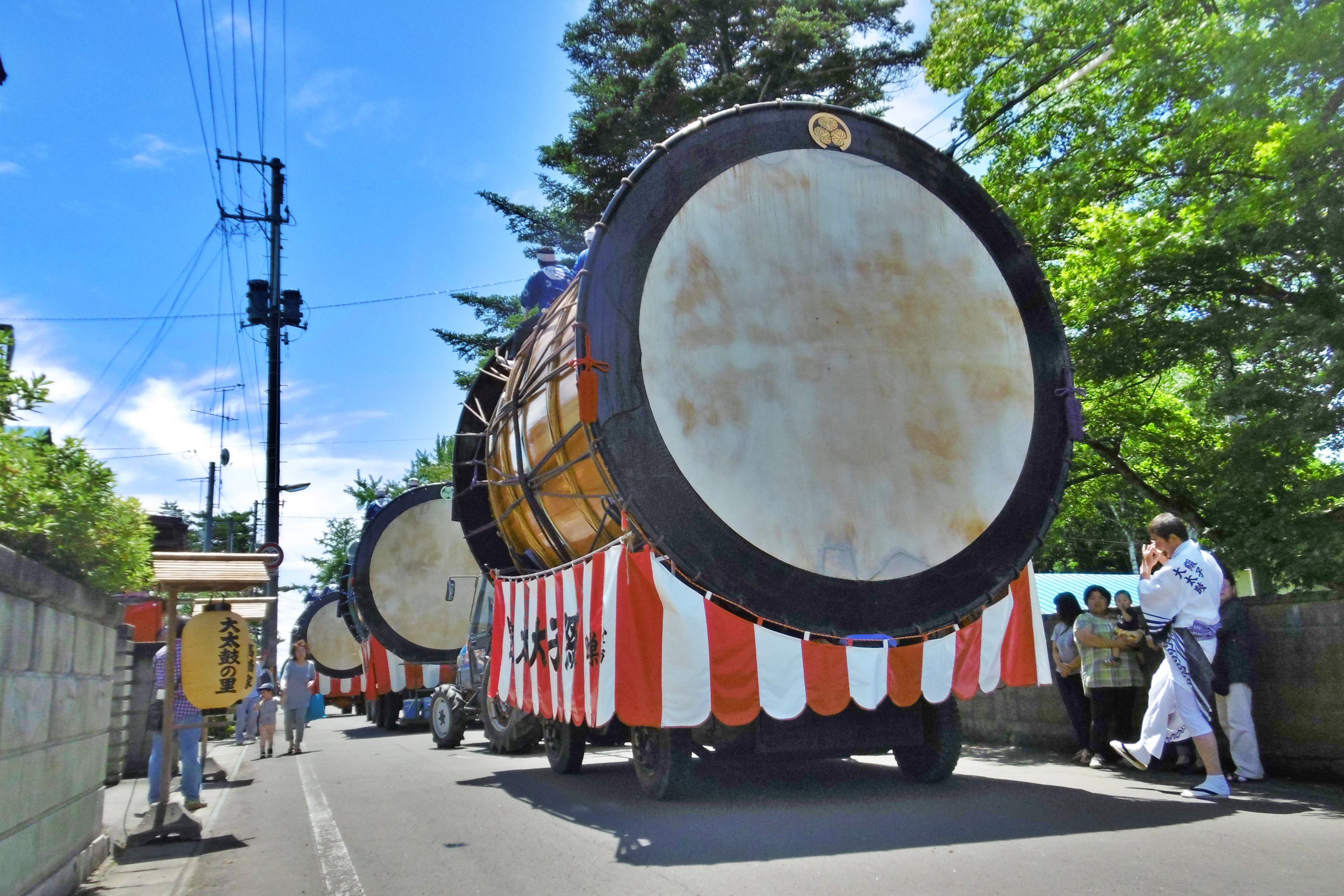

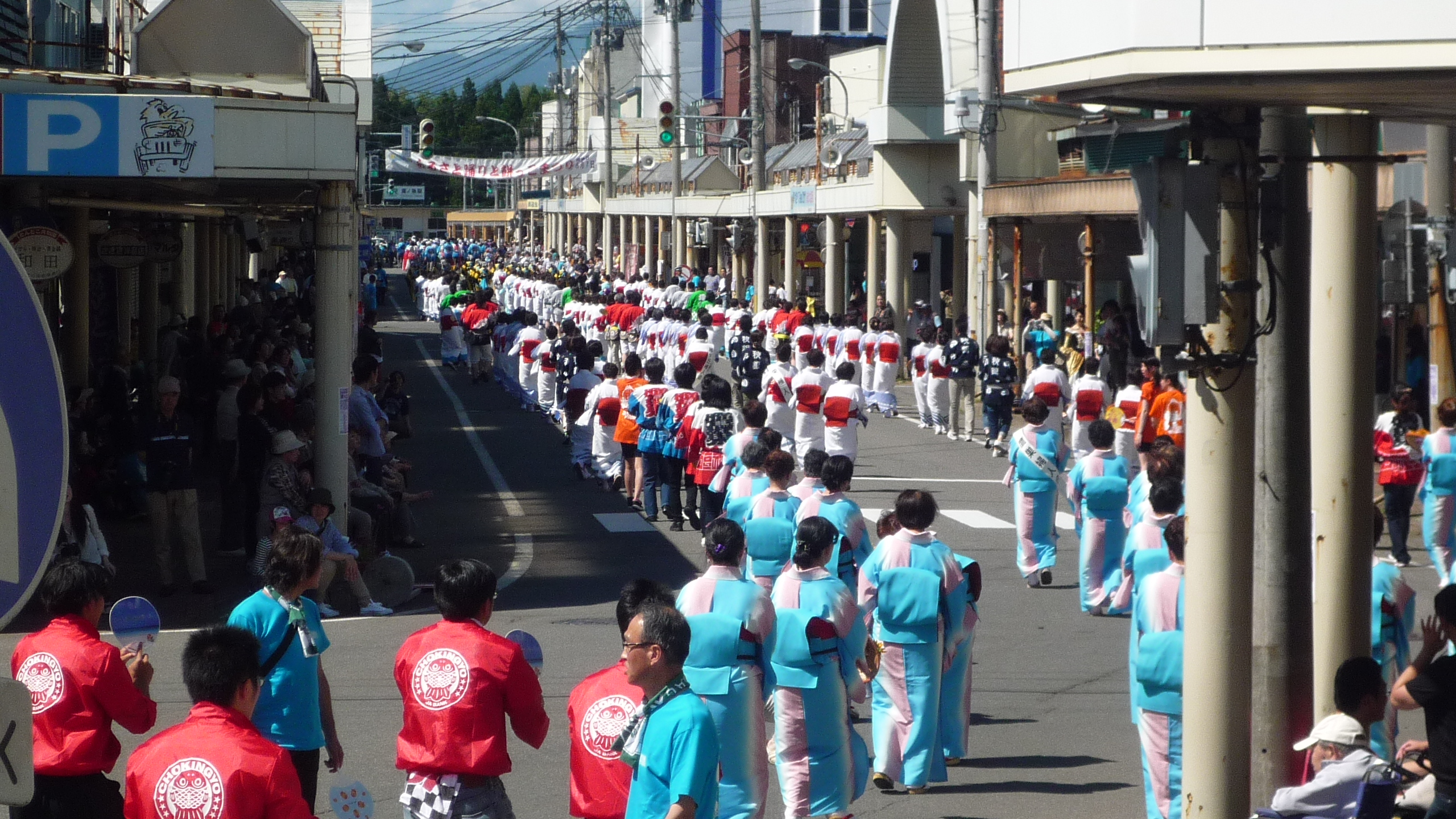

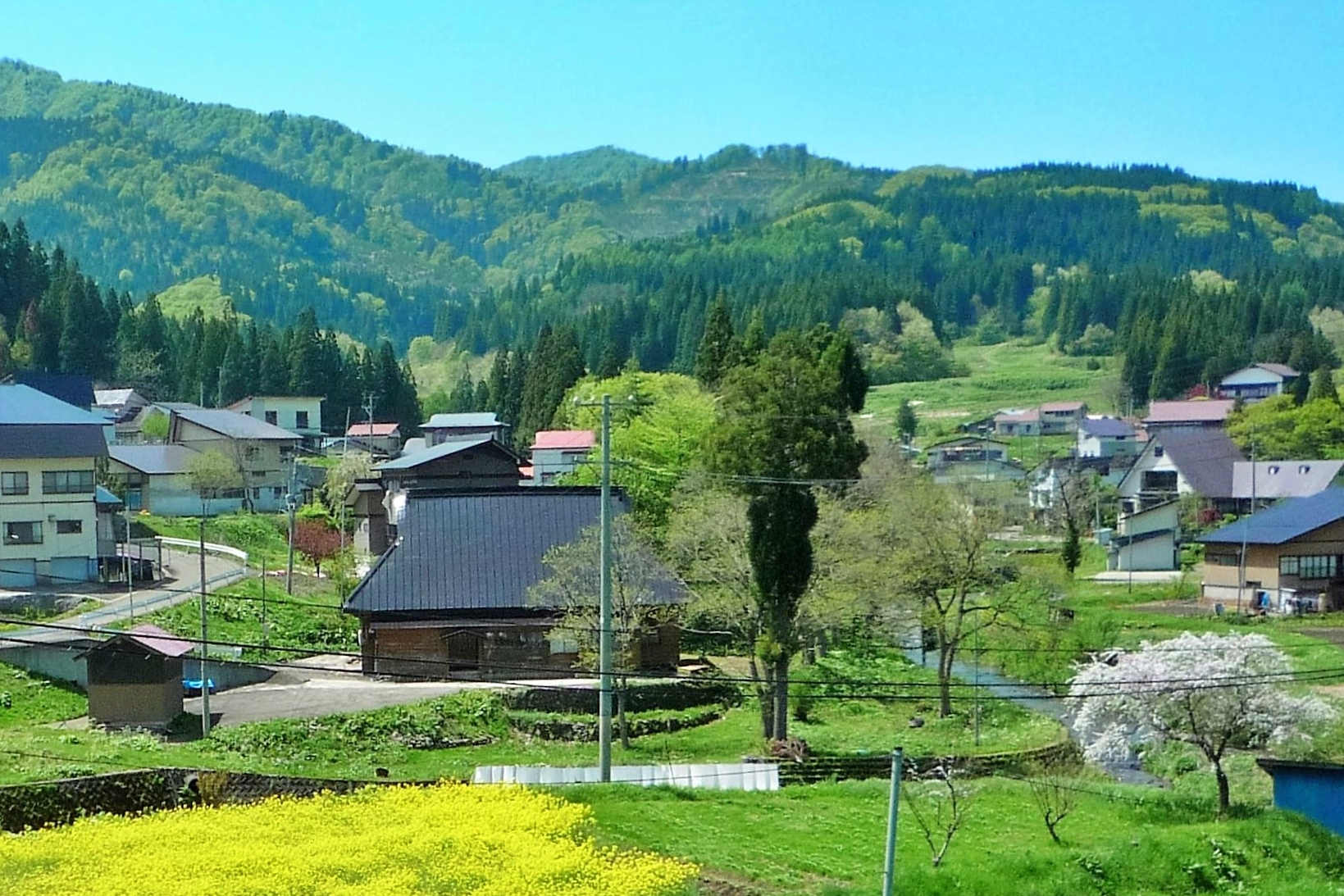

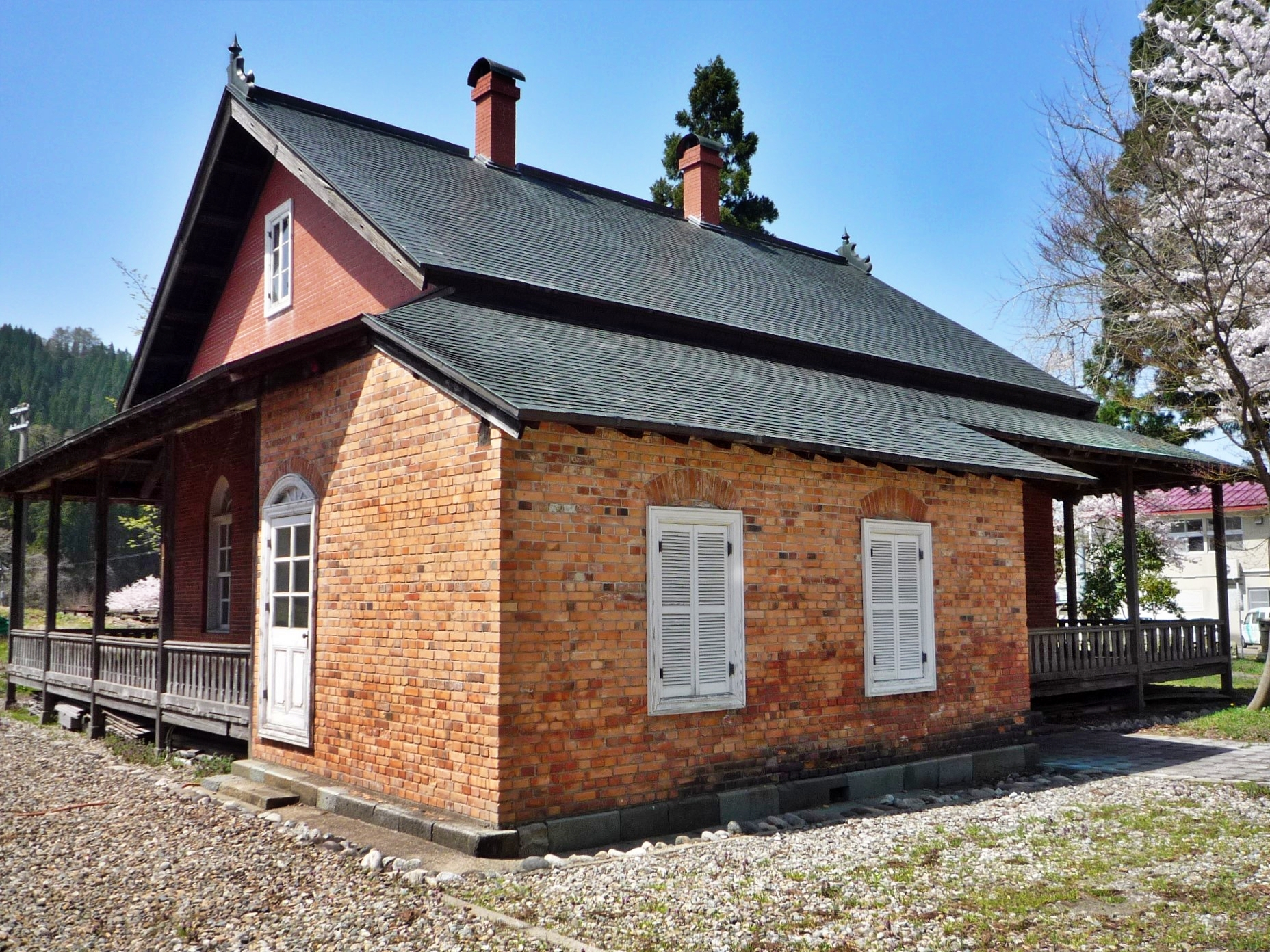
Snow Monster of Mount Moriyoshi	Akita Nairiku Line
Tsuzureko Traditional Drum	Takanosu downtown
Ani Nekko Village	Ani Mine
- Flag Seal
- Interactive map of Kitaakita
- Coordinates: 40°13′33.7″N 140°22′14.9″E
- Country: Japan
- Region: Tōhoku
- Prefecture: Akita

Government
  - -Mayor: Eiko Tsuya <津谷永光> (from April 2009)

Area
  - Total: 1,152.76 km^{2} (445.08 sq mi)

Population (February 28, 2023)
  - Total: 29,201
  - Density: 25.331/km^{2} (65.608/sq mi)
- Time zone: UTC+9 (Japan Standard Time)
- Phone number: 0186-62-1111
- Address: Hanazono-chō 19-1, Kitaakita-shi, Akita-ken 018-3392
- Climate: Cfa/Dfa
- Website: Official website
- Symbols
- Bird: Black woodpecker
- Flower: Hydrangea
- Tree: Beech

Kitaakita (Japanese: 北秋田市, Hepburn: Kitaakita-shi) is a city located in Akita Prefecture, Japan. As of 28 February 2023, the city had an estimated population of 29,201, and a population density of 25 persons per km^{2}. The total area of the city is 1,152.76 square kilometres (445.08 sq mi).

== Geography ==
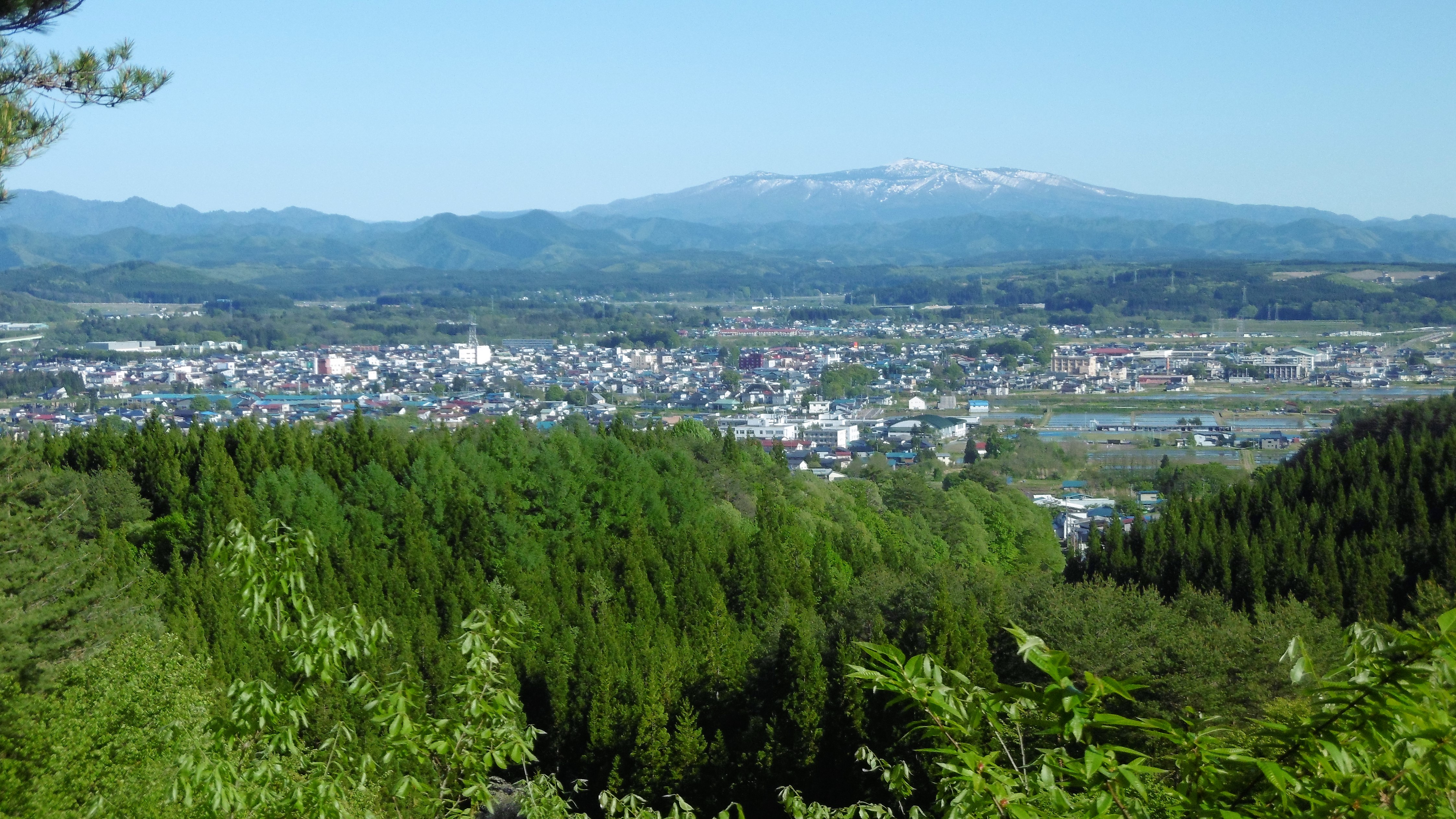
Panorama view of downtown Kitaakita

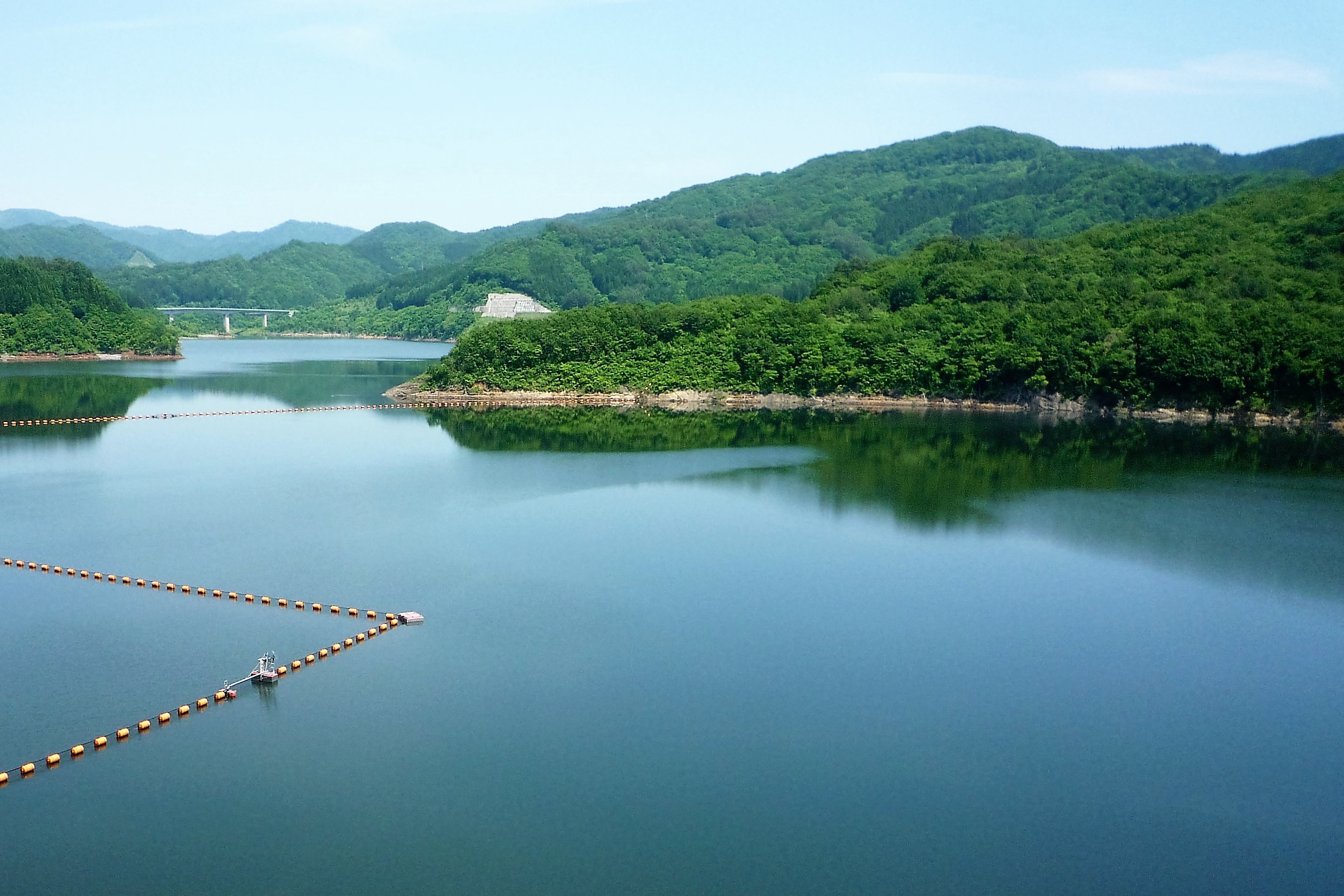
Lake Shimiko

Kitaakita is located in the mountains of north-central Akita Prefecture, about 80 kilometers northeast of the prefectural capital of Akita city. It accounts for about 10% of the total area of Akita Prefecture. The city is bordered by the Ōu Mountains on the east. The main urban area is centered around the Takanosu Basin in the middle reaches of the Yoneshiro River, and river basins such as the Ani River and the Koani River, which are tributaries of the Yoneshiro River. The Yoneshiro River originates from the Ōu Mountains, which form the border of the city to the east and south. Much of the city is forest and parts of the city are within the borders of the Towada-Hachimantai National Park. Due to its inland location, the city is noted for its heavy snowfall in winter.

=== Neighboring municipalities ===
Akita Prefecture

- Akita
- Fujisato
- Kamikoani
- Kazuno
- Noshiro
- Ōdate
- Semboku

== Climate ==
Kitaakita has a humid continental climate (Köppen climate classification Dfa) with large seasonal temperature differences, with warm to hot (and often humid) summers and cold (sometimes severely cold) winters. Precipitation is significant throughout the year, but is heaviest from August to October. The average annual temperature in Kitaakita is 10.5 °C (50.9 °F). The average annual rainfall is 1,704.7 mm (67.11 in) with July as the wettest month. The temperatures are highest on average in August, at around 23.7 °C (74.7 °F), and lowest in January, at around −1.5 °C (29.3 °F).

Climate data for Takanosu, Kitaakita (elevation 29 m, 1991–2020 normals, extremes 1976–present)
Month	Jan	Feb	Mar	Apr	May	Jun	Jul	Aug	Sep	Oct	Nov	Dec	Year
Record high °C (°F)	10.6 (51.1)	20.2 (68.4)	23.9 (75.0)	30.0 (86.0)	32.5 (90.5)	34.1 (93.4)	37.4 (99.3)	38.9 (102.0)	37.9 (100.2)	29.1 (84.4)	23.9 (75.0)	16.3 (61.3)	38.9 (102.0)
Mean daily maximum °C (°F)	1.7 (35.1)	2.9 (37.2)	7.1 (44.8)	14.3 (57.7)	20.2 (68.4)	24.4 (75.9)	27.5 (81.5)	29.0 (84.2)	24.9 (76.8)	18.2 (64.8)	10.9 (51.6)	4.2 (39.6)	15.5 (59.9)
Daily mean °C (°F)	−1.5 (29.3)	−0.9 (30.4)	2.3 (36.1)	8.2 (46.8)	14.2 (57.6)	18.8 (65.8)	22.6 (72.7)	23.7 (74.7)	19.1 (66.4)	12.2 (54.0)	6.0 (42.8)	0.8 (33.4)	10.5 (50.9)
Mean daily minimum °C (°F)	−4.7 (23.5)	−4.7 (23.5)	−2.1 (28.2)	2.5 (36.5)	8.7 (47.7)	14.0 (57.2)	18.7 (65.7)	19.4 (66.9)	14.6 (58.3)	7.4 (45.3)	1.8 (35.2)	−2.2 (28.0)	6.1 (43.0)
Record low °C (°F)	−17.6 (0.3)	−17.8 (0.0)	−15.3 (4.5)	−9.2 (15.4)	−1.9 (28.6)	4.9 (40.8)	6.7 (44.1)	9.8 (49.6)	3.0 (37.4)	−1.7 (28.9)	−8.8 (16.2)	−14.5 (5.9)	−17.8 (0.0)
Average precipitation mm (inches)	116.7 (4.59)	92.4 (3.64)	97.0 (3.82)	103.4 (4.07)	116.3 (4.58)	119.8 (4.72)	214.7 (8.45)	198.1 (7.80)	164.7 (6.48)	162.7 (6.41)	167.8 (6.61)	151.4 (5.96)	1,704.7 (67.11)
Average snowfall cm (inches)	183 (72)	145 (57)	68 (27)	1 (0.4)	0 (0)	0 (0)	0 (0)	0 (0)	0 (0)	0 (0)	8 (3.1)	113 (44)	514 (202)
Average precipitation days (≥ 1.0 mm)	21.7	17.7	15.7	12.5	12.0	10.3	13.0	11.4	12.3	14.9	17.6	21.6	180.5
Mean monthly sunshine hours	49.1	74.0	123.6	171.3	184.1	176.9	149.4	180.0	149.9	132.3	88.9	47.4	1,528.2
Source: Japan Meteorological Agency (1991–2020 normals, extremes 1976–present)

Climate data for Wakigami, Kitaakita (elevation 84 m, 2003–2020 normals, extremes 2003–present)
Month	Jan	Feb	Mar	Apr	May	Jun	Jul	Aug	Sep	Oct	Nov	Dec	Year
Record high °C (°F)	9.8 (49.6)	19.2 (66.6)	22.9 (73.2)	28.6 (83.5)	31.3 (88.3)	33.0 (91.4)	36.2 (97.2)	37.3 (99.1)	35.6 (96.1)	27.0 (80.6)	22.8 (73.0)	15.7 (60.3)	37.3 (99.1)
Mean daily maximum °C (°F)	0.9 (33.6)	2.2 (36.0)	6.4 (43.5)	13.4 (56.1)	19.8 (67.6)	24.0 (75.2)	26.8 (80.2)	28.6 (83.5)	24.3 (75.7)	17.6 (63.7)	10.6 (51.1)	3.6 (38.5)	14.9 (58.8)
Daily mean °C (°F)	−2.0 (28.4)	−1.5 (29.3)	1.8 (35.2)	7.4 (45.3)	13.7 (56.7)	18.3 (64.9)	22.0 (71.6)	23.3 (73.9)	18.8 (65.8)	11.7 (53.1)	5.7 (42.3)	0.3 (32.5)	10.0 (50.0)
Mean daily minimum °C (°F)	−5.3 (22.5)	−5.5 (22.1)	−2.6 (27.3)	1.5 (34.7)	7.9 (46.2)	13.1 (55.6)	18.0 (64.4)	19.1 (66.4)	14.1 (57.4)	6.5 (43.7)	1.3 (34.3)	−2.9 (26.8)	5.4 (41.7)
Record low °C (°F)	−15.8 (3.6)	−15.8 (3.6)	−12.6 (9.3)	−5.6 (21.9)	−1.5 (29.3)	4.3 (39.7)	9.9 (49.8)	11.3 (52.3)	4.6 (40.3)	−2.5 (27.5)	−7.5 (18.5)	−11.5 (11.3)	−15.8 (3.6)
Average precipitation mm (inches)	81.1 (3.19)	72.7 (2.86)	92.7 (3.65)	109.5 (4.31)	100.7 (3.96)	112.8 (4.44)	211.9 (8.34)	211.5 (8.33)	165.6 (6.52)	160.6 (6.32)	169.0 (6.65)	130.2 (5.13)	1,603.1 (63.11)
Average precipitation days (≥ 1.0 mm)	17.9	13.8	13.9	12.1	11.4	9.9	12.3	11.0	11.6	13.7	17.4	20.5	166.4
Source: Japan Meteorological Agency (2003–2020 normals, extremes 2003–present)

Climate data for Aniai, Kitaakita (elevation 120 m, 1991–2020 normals, extremes 1976–present)
Month	Jan	Feb	Mar	Apr	May	Jun	Jul	Aug	Sep	Oct	Nov	Dec	Year
Record high °C (°F)	11.1 (52.0)	17.3 (63.1)	21.1 (70.0)	28.8 (83.8)	32.0 (89.6)	33.5 (92.3)	36.3 (97.3)	37.1 (98.8)	34.3 (93.7)	27.4 (81.3)	24.3 (75.7)	18.2 (64.8)	37.1 (98.8)
Mean daily maximum °C (°F)	1.0 (33.8)	2.1 (35.8)	6.0 (42.8)	13.5 (56.3)	20.2 (68.4)	24.2 (75.6)	27.4 (81.3)	28.7 (83.7)	24.3 (75.7)	17.6 (63.7)	10.6 (51.1)	3.6 (38.5)	14.9 (58.8)
Daily mean °C (°F)	−2.0 (28.4)	−1.6 (29.1)	1.4 (34.5)	7.4 (45.3)	13.9 (57.0)	18.3 (64.9)	22.1 (71.8)	23.1 (73.6)	18.6 (65.5)	11.8 (53.2)	5.6 (42.1)	0.3 (32.5)	9.9 (49.8)
Mean daily minimum °C (°F)	−5.0 (23.0)	−5.0 (23.0)	−2.6 (27.3)	1.8 (35.2)	8.0 (46.4)	13.1 (55.6)	17.9 (64.2)	18.7 (65.7)	14.2 (57.6)	7.3 (45.1)	1.7 (35.1)	−2.5 (27.5)	5.6 (42.1)
Record low °C (°F)	−16.4 (2.5)	−17.2 (1.0)	−15.8 (3.6)	−8.5 (16.7)	−1.3 (29.7)	5.2 (41.4)	9.5 (49.1)	9.8 (49.6)	3.2 (37.8)	−0.7 (30.7)	−7.8 (18.0)	−12.6 (9.3)	−17.2 (1.0)
Average precipitation mm (inches)	164.3 (6.47)	125.0 (4.92)	132.0 (5.20)	131.8 (5.19)	133.9 (5.27)	136.6 (5.38)	233.8 (9.20)	240.0 (9.45)	193.9 (7.63)	191.2 (7.53)	218.0 (8.58)	199.3 (7.85)	2,099.7 (82.67)
Average snowfall cm (inches)	259 (102)	198 (78)	127 (50)	13 (5.1)	0 (0)	0 (0)	0 (0)	0 (0)	0 (0)	0 (0)	21 (8.3)	170 (67)	778 (306)
Average precipitation days (≥ 1.0 mm)	24.2	20.0	18.1	13.8	12.4	10.9	13.5	12.7	13.0	15.5	18.9	23.4	196.3
Mean monthly sunshine hours	31.6	52.8	97.8	156.6	188.3	180.9	150.4	171.5	146.7	124.7	75.3	40.0	1,422.9
Source: Japan Meteorological Agency (1991–2020 normals, extremes 1976–present)

== Demographics ==
Per Japanese census data, the population of Kitaakita has been decreasing rapidly over the past 60 years.

Historical population
Year	Pop.	±% p.a.
1950	64,607	—
1960	66,150	+0.24%
1970	55,601	−1.72%
1980	51,210	−0.82%
1990	46,660	−0.93%
2000	42,050	−1.03%
2010	36,397	−1.43%
2020	30,198	−1.85%

== History ==
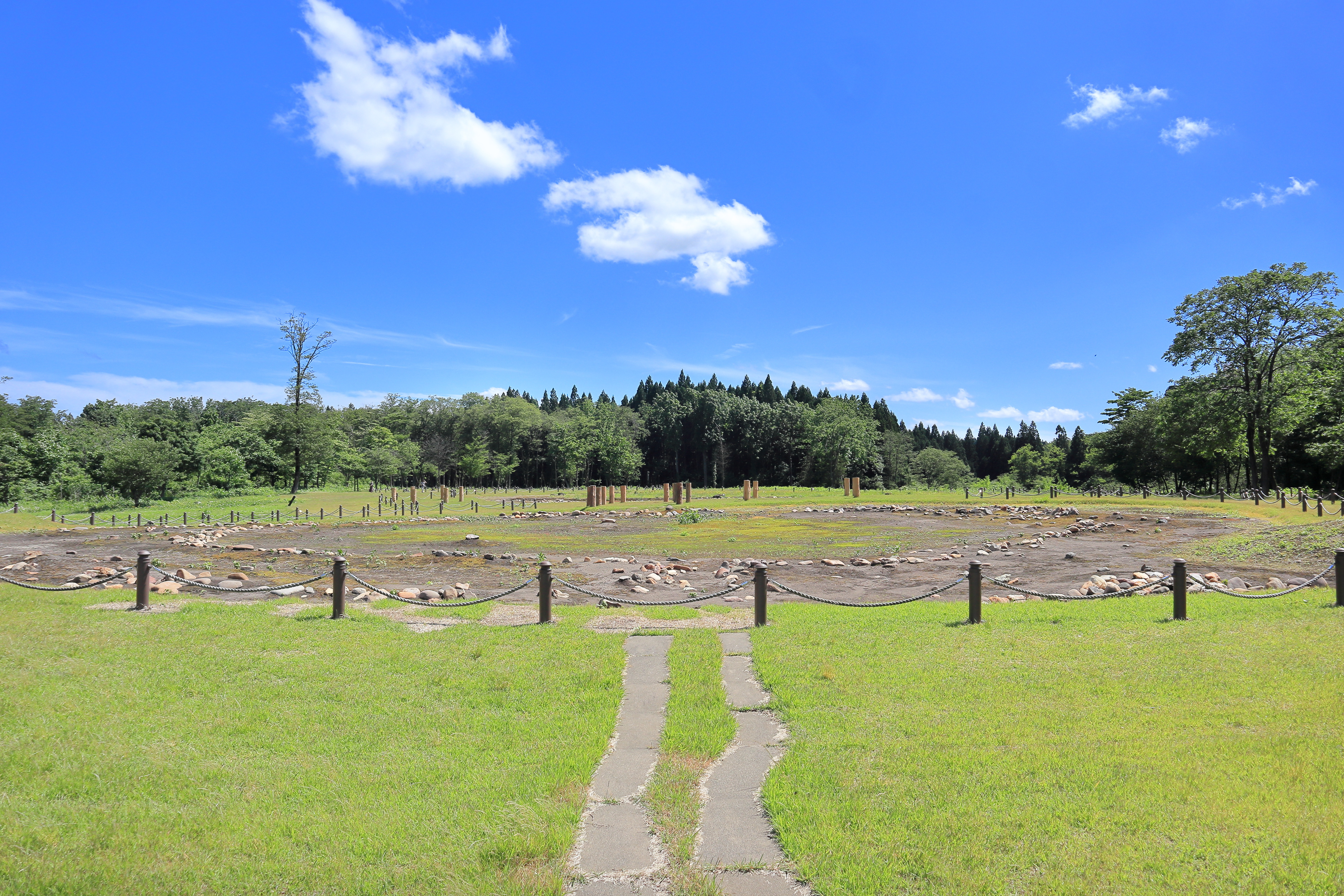
Isedotai Ruins

The area of present-day Kitaakita was part of ancient Dewa Province. During the Edo period, the area came under the control of the Satake clan, who ruled the northern third of the province from Kubota Domain. After the start of the Meiji period, the area became part of Kitaakita District, Akita Prefecture in 1878 with the establishment of the modern municipalities system.

The city of Kitaakita was established on March 22, 2005, from the merger of the towns of Aikawa, Ani, Moriyoshi and Takanosu (all from Kitaakita District).

== Government ==
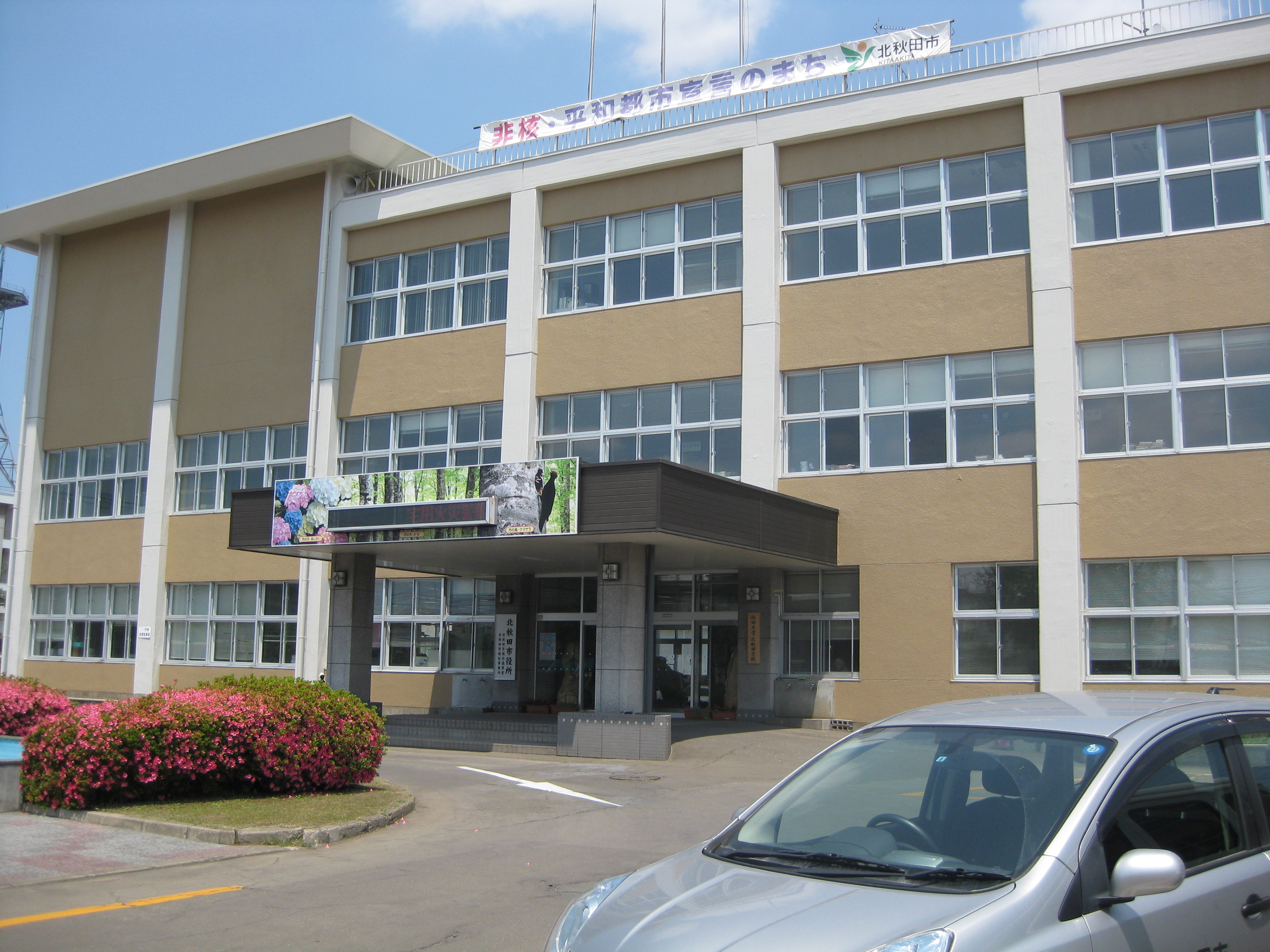
Kitaakita City Hall

Kitaakita has a mayor-council form of government with a directly elected mayor and a unicameral city legislature of 18 members. The city contributes two members to the Akita Prefectural Assembly. In terms of national politics, the city is part of Akita District 2 of the lower house of the Diet of Japan.

== Economy ==
The economy of Kitaakita is based on agriculture, forestry, manufacturing of clothing and electronic components, and seasonal tourism.

== Education ==
- Akita University – Kitaakita branch campus
- Kitaakita has seven public elementary schools and three public middle schools operated by the city government and one public high school operated by the Akita Prefectural Board of Education. The prefecture also operates one special education school for the handicapped.

== Transportation ==
=== Airport ===
- Odate–Noshiro Airport

=== Railway ===
- JR East – Ōu Main Line
  - Maeyama – Takanosu – Nukazawa
- Akita Nairiku Jukan Tetsudo – Akita Nairiku Line
  - Takanosu – Nishi-Takanosu – Ogata – Ōnodai – Aikawa – Kamisugi – Yonaizawa – Katsurase – Ani-Maeda – Maeda-Minami – Kobuchi – Aniai – Arase – Kayakusa – Okashinai – Iwanome – Hitachinai – Okuani – Ani-Matagi

=== Highway ===
- Akita Expressway
- National Route 7
- National Route 105
- National Route 285
- National Route 155

== Local attractions ==
- Isedōtai Ruins – a Jōmon period archaeological site and National Historic Monument
- Yasu Falls – one of the Japan's Top 100 Waterfalls
- Mount Moriyoshi Ani Ski Resort
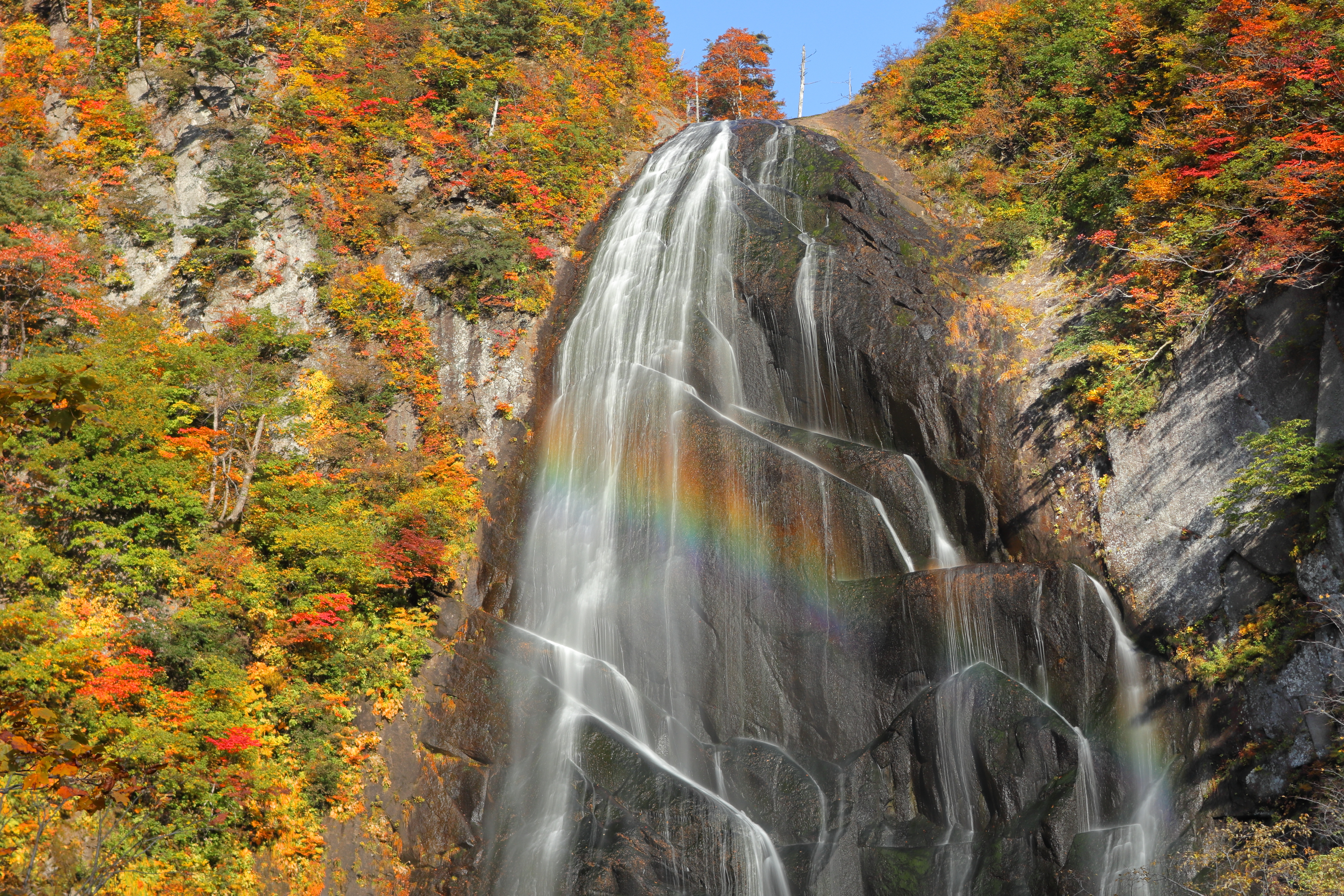
Yasu Falls

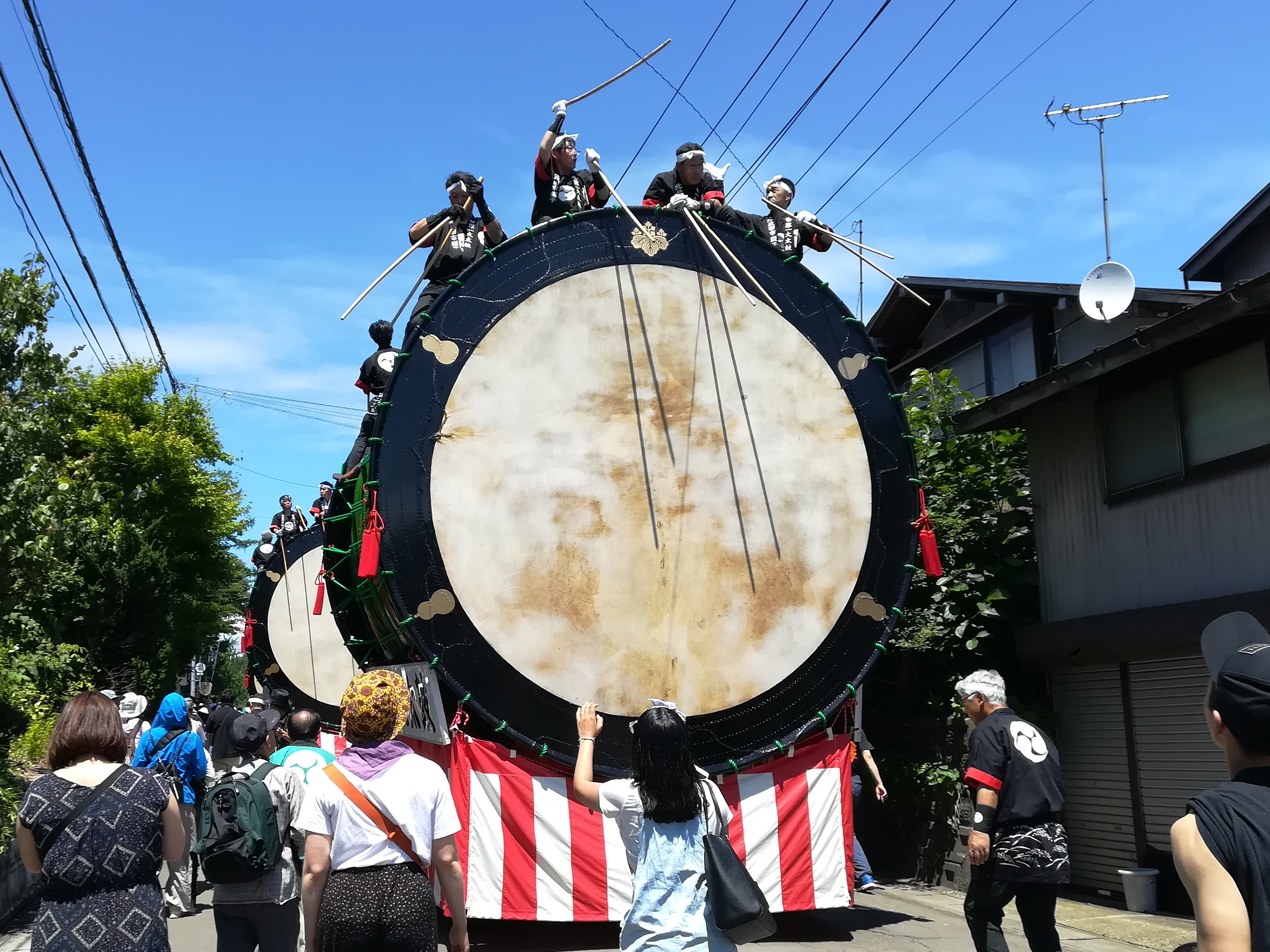
Tsuzureko Traditional Drum Festival held on every July 15

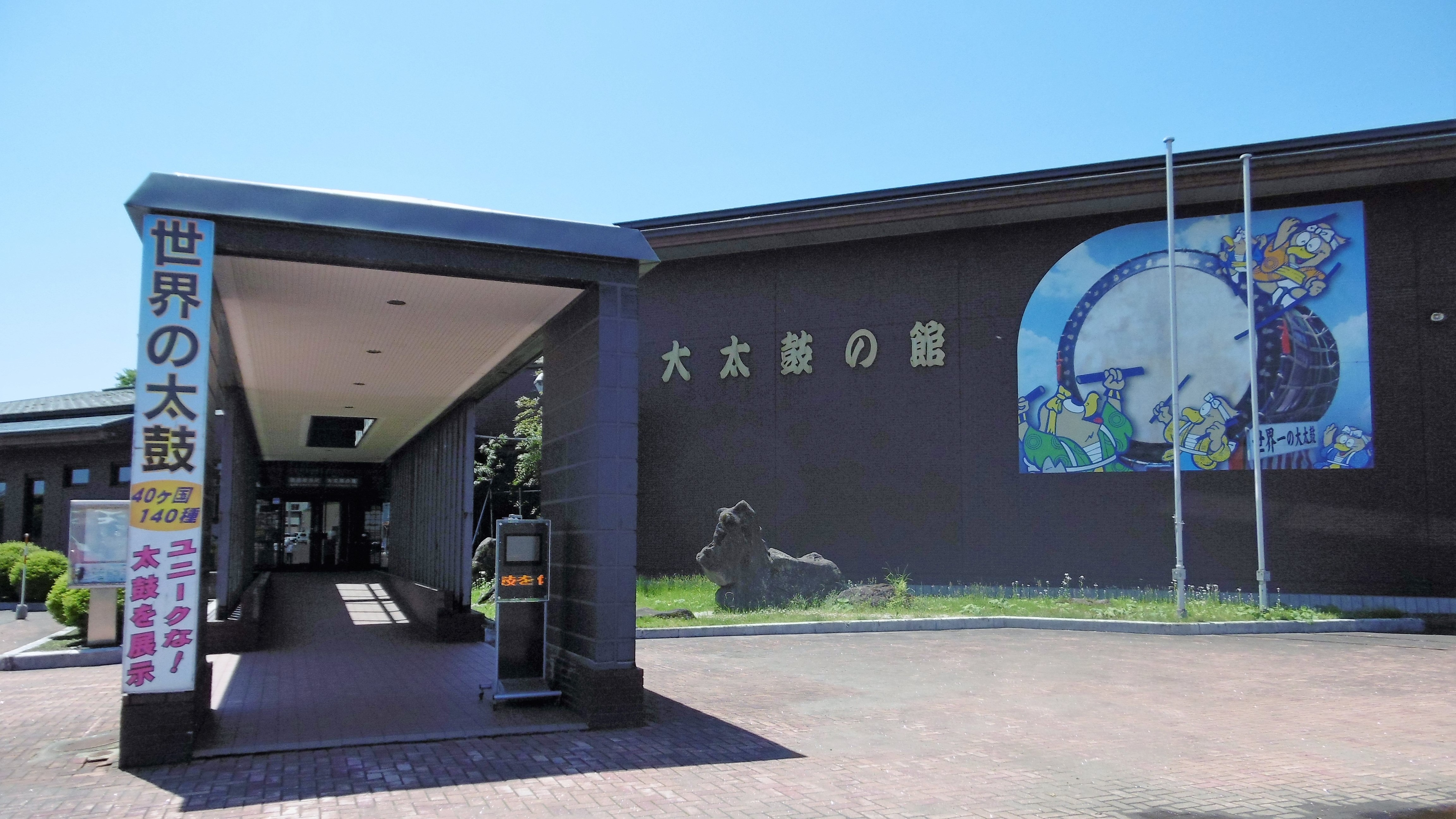
Tsuzureko Traditional Drum Museum

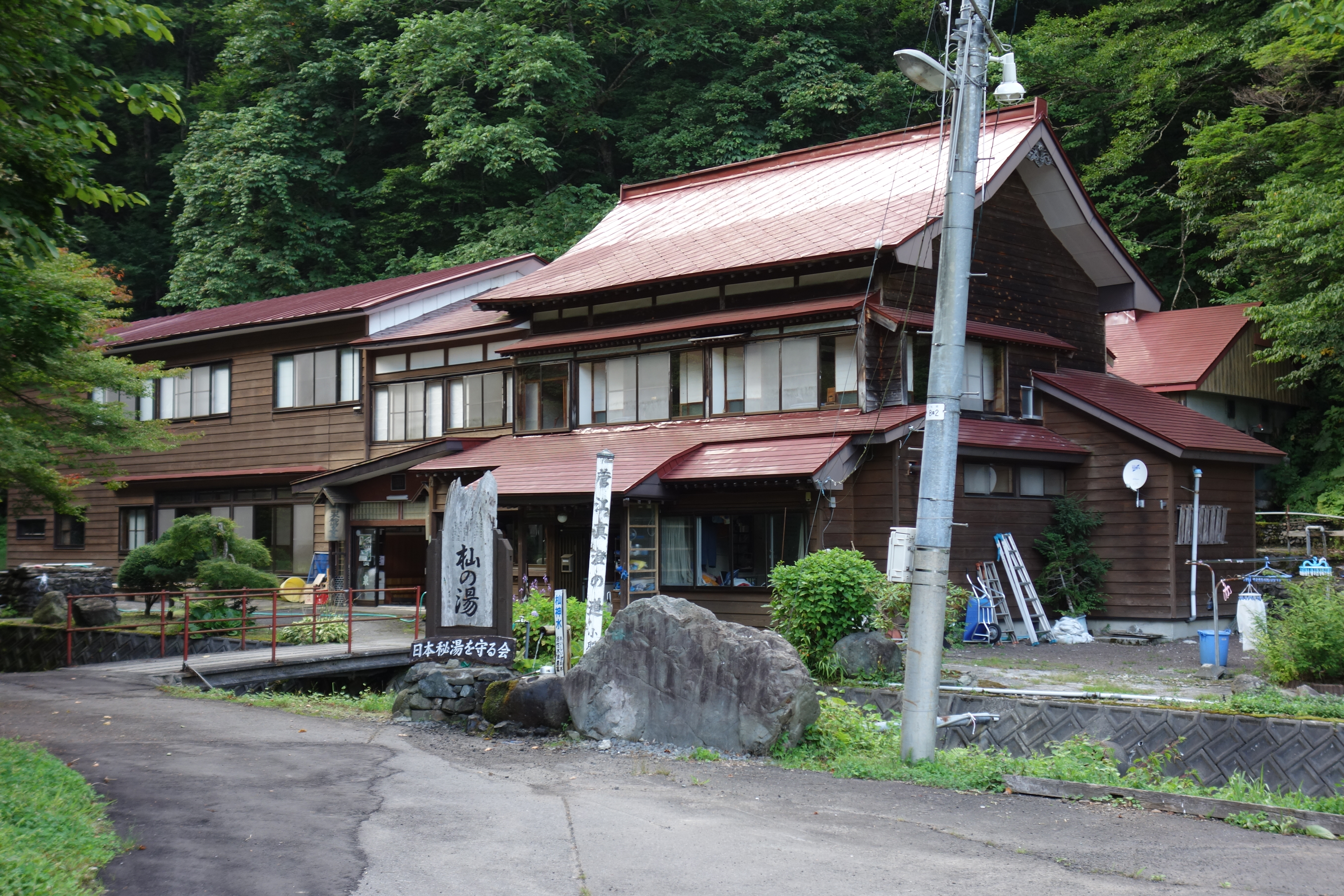
Soma Onsen

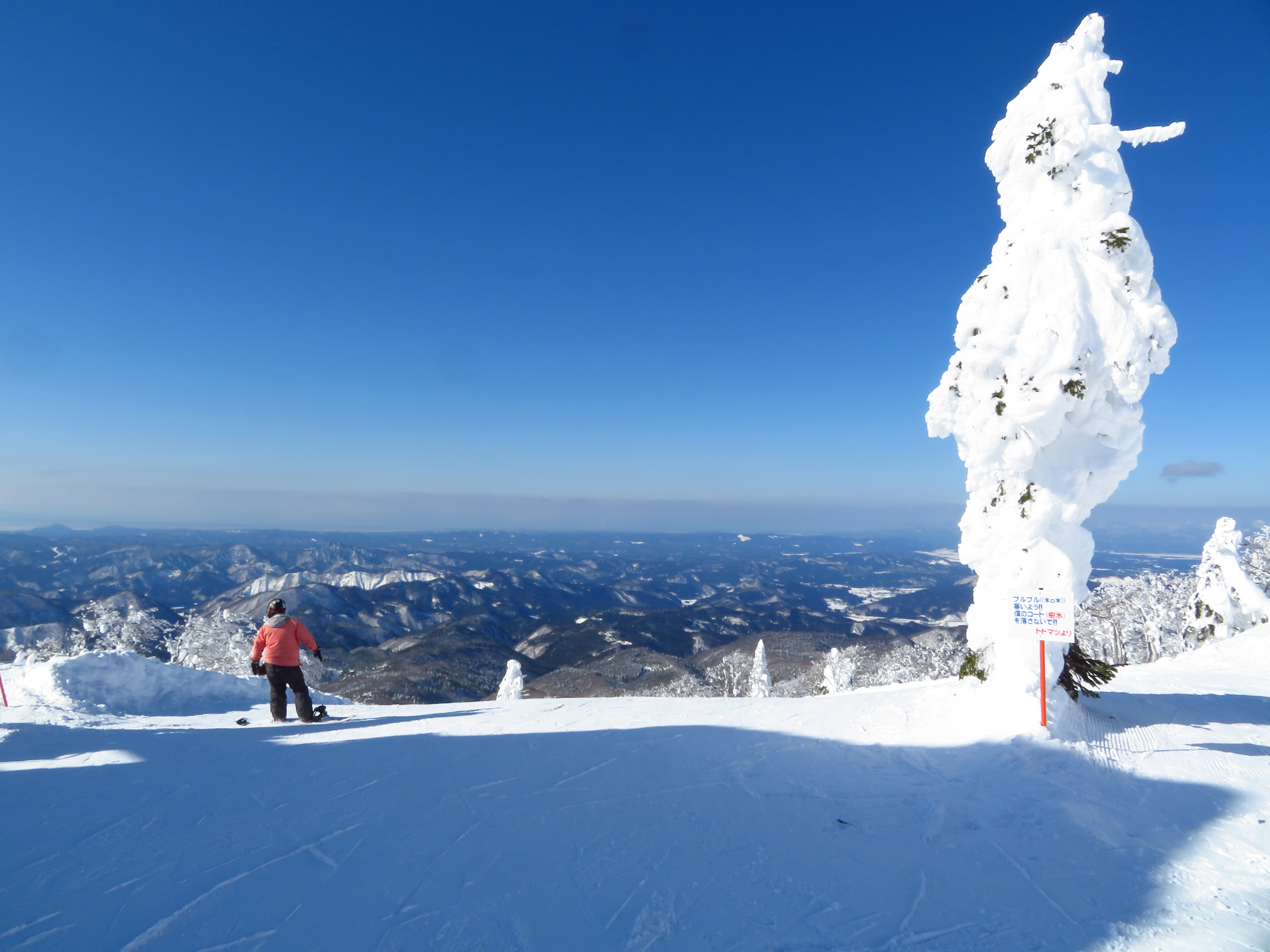
Mount Moriyoshi Ani Ski Resort

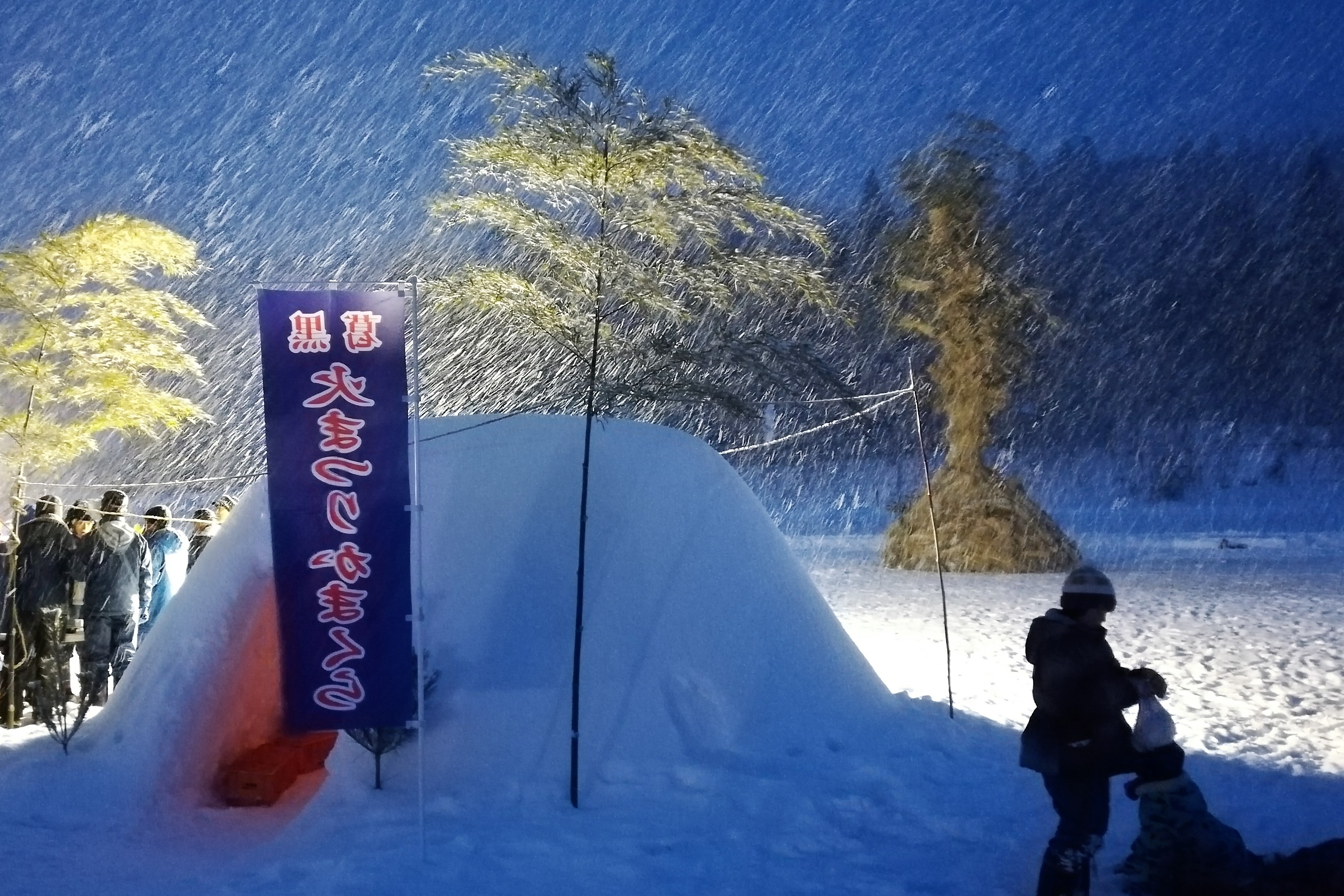
Kuzoguro Kamakura Festival held in February

== Sister cities ==
- Fengcheng, Liaoning, China, friendship city since September 11, 1997

== Notable people ==
- Kinya Abe, fencer
- Takekaze Akira, sumo wrestler
- Norihito Kobayashi, Olympic ski jumper
- Yūsuke Minato, Olympic ski jumper
- Satoshi Nakajima, baseball player
- Tamezō Narita, musician
- Fuyuko Suzuki, Olympic Biathlon athlete
- Yuki Suzuki, volleyball player
- Daito Takahashi, Olympic ski jumper
- Kieko Watanabe, novelist
