= Ani, Akita =

Dissolved municipality in Akita prefecture, Japan

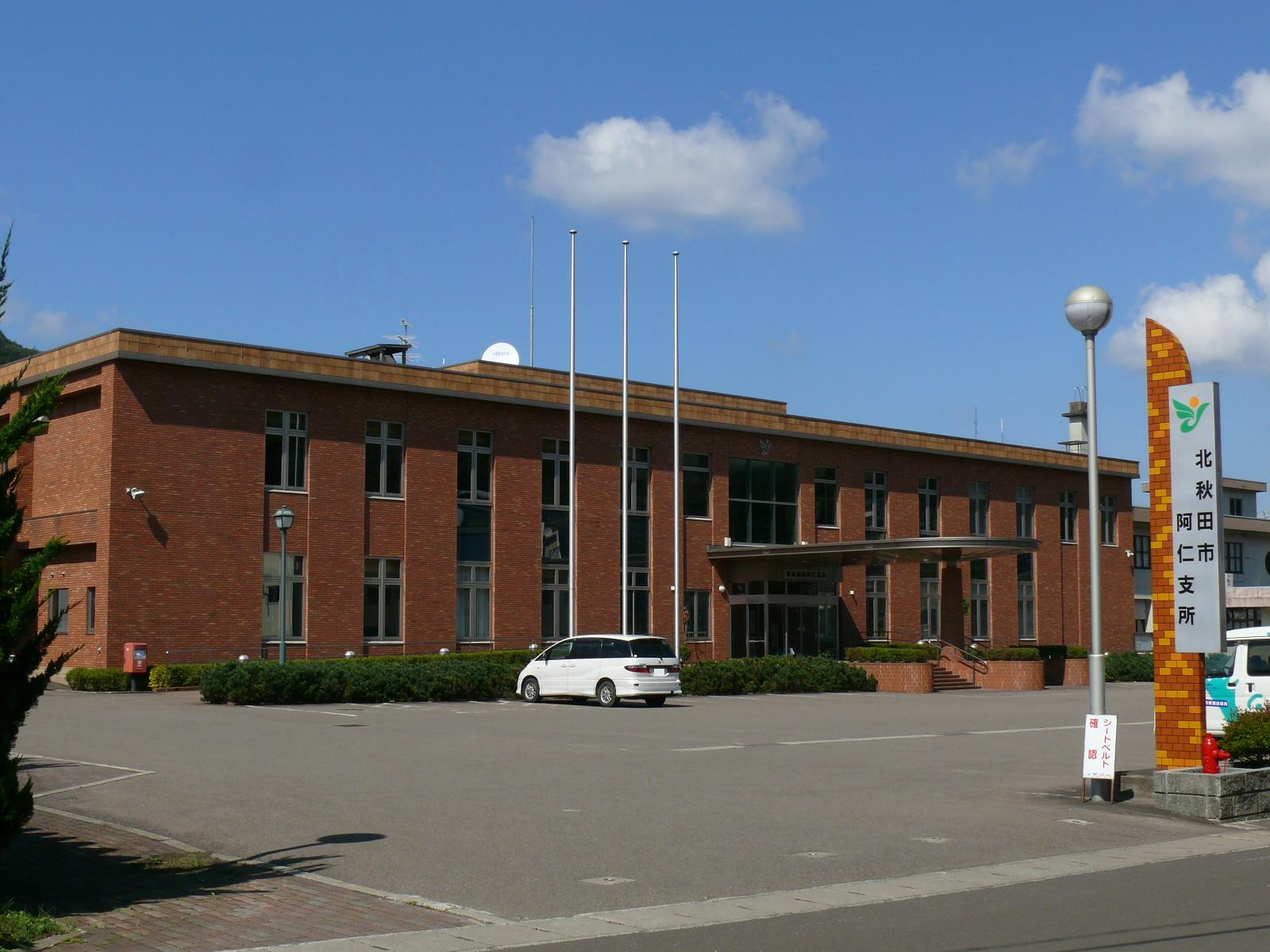
Ani Town Hall

Ani (阿仁町, Ani-machi) was a town located in Kitaakita District, Akita Prefecture, Japan.

In 2003, the town had an estimated population of 4,079 and a density of 10.97 persons per km^{2}. The total area was 371.92 km^{2}.

On March 22, 2005, Ani, along with the towns of Aikawa, Moriyoshi and Takanosu (all from Kitaakita District) merged to create the city of Kitaakita.

== In popular culture ==
- Satoru Noda's historical manga series Golden Kamuy features a major character, Genjirō Tanigaki, who comes from the village of Ani and is a member of the Tōhoku-indigenous Matagi population.
