= Takanosu, Akita =

Dissolved municipality in Akita prefecture, Japan

Takanosu (鷹巣町, Takanosu-machi) was a town located in Kitaakita District, Akita Prefecture, Japan.

In 2003, the town had an estimated population of 20,962 and a density of 64.31 persons per km^{2}. The total area was 325.97 km^{2}.

On March 22, 2005, Takanosu, along with the towns of Aikawa, Ani and Moriyoshi (all from Kitaakita District) merged to create the city of Kitaakita.

== Climate ==
Climate data for Takanosu, Kitaakita (1991−2020 normals, extremes 1976−present)
Month	Jan	Feb	Mar	Apr	May	Jun	Jul	Aug	Sep	Oct	Nov	Dec	Year
Record high °C (°F)	10.6 (51.1)	17.6 (63.7)	20.4 (68.7)	30.0 (86.0)	32.5 (90.5)	34.0 (93.2)	37.4 (99.3)	38.6 (101.5)	37.9 (100.2)	28.6 (83.5)	23.0 (73.4)	16.0 (60.8)	38.6 (101.5)
Mean daily maximum °C (°F)	1.7 (35.1)	2.9 (37.2)	7.1 (44.8)	14.3 (57.7)	20.2 (68.4)	24.4 (75.9)	27.5 (81.5)	29.0 (84.2)	24.9 (76.8)	18.2 (64.8)	10.9 (51.6)	4.2 (39.6)	15.4 (59.8)
Daily mean °C (°F)	−1.5 (29.3)	−0.9 (30.4)	2.3 (36.1)	8.2 (46.8)	14.2 (57.6)	18.8 (65.8)	22.6 (72.7)	23.7 (74.7)	19.1 (66.4)	12.2 (54.0)	6.0 (42.8)	0.8 (33.4)	10.5 (50.8)
Mean daily minimum °C (°F)	−4.7 (23.5)	−4.7 (23.5)	−2.1 (28.2)	2.5 (36.5)	8.7 (47.7)	14.0 (57.2)	18.7 (65.7)	19.4 (66.9)	14.6 (58.3)	7.4 (45.3)	1.8 (35.2)	−2.2 (28.0)	6.1 (43.0)
Record low °C (°F)	−17.6 (0.3)	−17.8 (0.0)	−15.3 (4.5)	−9.2 (15.4)	−1.9 (28.6)	4.9 (40.8)	6.7 (44.1)	9.8 (49.6)	3.0 (37.4)	−1.7 (28.9)	−8.8 (16.2)	−14.5 (5.9)	−17.8 (0.0)
Average precipitation mm (inches)	116.7 (4.59)	92.4 (3.64)	97.0 (3.82)	103.4 (4.07)	116.3 (4.58)	119.8 (4.72)	214.7 (8.45)	198.1 (7.80)	164.7 (6.48)	162.7 (6.41)	167.8 (6.61)	151.4 (5.96)	1,704.7 (67.11)
Average snowfall cm (inches)	183 (72)	145 (57)	68 (27)	1 (0.4)	0 (0)	0 (0)	0 (0)	0 (0)	0 (0)	0 (0)	8 (3.1)	113 (44)	514 (202)
Average precipitation days (≥ 1.0 mm)	21.7	17.7	15.7	12.5	12.0	10.3	13.0	11.4	12.3	14.9	17.6	21.6	180.7
Average snowy days (≥ 3 cm)	19.9	17.0	9.3	0.2	0	0	0	0	0	0	1.2	12.6	60.2
Mean monthly sunshine hours	49.1	74.0	123.6	171.3	184.1	176.9	149.4	180.0	149.9	132.3	88.9	47.4	1,528.2
Source: Japan Meteorological Agency
