= List of dams in Akita Prefecture =

The following is a list of dams in Akita Prefecture, Japan.

== List ==
Name	Location	Started	Opened	Height	Length	Image	DiJ number
Ainono Dam			1961	40.8 m (134 ft)	133.9 m (439 ft)		0374
Akazawa Dam			1935	19.3 m (63 ft)	72.7 m (239 ft)		0340
Asahikawa Chisui Dam		1967	1972	51.5 m (169 ft)	380 m (1,250 ft)		0383
Bessho Tameike Dam			1957	19 m (62 ft)	102.5 m (336 ft)		0372
Chōkai Dam		1993		81 m (266 ft)	365 m (1,198 ft)		3190
Etsuri Dam			1949	17.7 m (58 ft)	79.6 m (261 ft)		0359
Fujikura Dam							
Haginari Dam	,	1961	1966	61 m (200 ft)	173 m (568 ft)		0379
Hanekawa Dam			1967	17.7 m (58 ft)	138.7 m (455 ft)		0380
Hayakuchi Dam		1969	1976	61 m (200 ft)	178 m (584 ft)		0386
Hokiden Tameike Dam			1938	25.7 m (84 ft)	104 m (341 ft)		0348
Hotokezawa Dam			1935	24.7 m (81 ft)	180 m (590 ft)		3394
Hotta Tameike Dam			1956	22.6 m (74 ft)	160 m (520 ft)		0347
Ichijogi Dam			1938	18.5 m (61 ft)	203 m (666 ft)		0354
Itado Dam		1980	1983	28.7 m (94 ft)	120 m (390 ft)		0397
Iwagami Dam			1969	23.3 m (76 ft)	130 m (430 ft)		0335
Iwami Dam		1970	1978	66.5 m (218 ft)	242 m (794 ft)		0388
Jindai Dam		1938	1940	26.5 m (87 ft)	178 m (584 ft)		0353
Kagura Dam			1957	20 m (66 ft)	70 m (230 ft)		3365
Kanazawa Dam			1980	29.2 m (96 ft)	190.4 m (625 ft)		0389
Karasawa No.1 Dam			1951	16 m (52 ft)	93 m (305 ft)		0362
Katajiri Dam			1963	31.8 m (104 ft)	128.4 m (421 ft)		0376
Kohabiro Dam			1972	20 m (66 ft)	166.2 m (545 ft)		0384
Kurakarizawa Dam			1945	18.6 m (61 ft)	80 m (260 ft)		0365
Kuromorigawa No.1 Dam		1974	1976	26 m (85 ft)	330 m (1,080 ft)		0387
Kuzugasawa Dam			1943	18.8 m (62 ft)	120 m (390 ft)		0352
Kyowa Dam		1979	1997	49.3 m (162 ft)	222.5 m (730 ft)		0393
Magura Dam		1928	1931	25.5 m (84 ft)	170 m (560 ft)		0332
Matsukura Dam			1961	21.9 m (72 ft)	98 m (322 ft)		0375
Matsumine Tameike Dam		1982	1992	19.9 m (65 ft)	120 m (390 ft)		3391
Minase Dam		1957	1963	66.5 m (218 ft)	215 m (705 ft)		0378
Mizusawa Dam		1975	1994	46.5 m (153 ft)	235 m (771 ft)		0390
Moriyoshi Dam		1951	1952	62 m (203 ft)	105 m (344 ft)		0368
Moriyoshizan Dam		1973	2011	89.9 m (295 ft)	786 m (2,579 ft)		0395
Myoei Tameike Dam			1935	18.3 m (60 ft)	710 m (2,330 ft)		0341
Naganuma Dam			1954	16.5 m (54 ft)	81 m (266 ft)		0369
Nangai Dam			1978	21.4 m (70 ft)	113.5 m (372 ft)		0385
Naruse Dam		1983		114.5 m (376 ft)	755 m (2,477 ft)		0400
Natsuze Dam		1938	1940	40 m (130 ft)	115.8 m (380 ft)		0367
Ohbuka Dam		1958	1961	21.6 m (71 ft)	53.5 m (176 ft)		0373
Ohdutsumi Dam			1921	15.6 m (51 ft)	133 m (436 ft)		3397
Omatsukawa Dam		1975	1998	65 m (213 ft)	296 m (971 ft)		0391
Ohtakisawa Tameike Dam			1937	26.6 m (87 ft)	114.3 m (375 ft)		0344
Ohuchi Dam		1991	2007	27.5 m (90 ft)	106 m (348 ft)		3110
Ohyoshizawa Tameike Dam			1934	18.5 m (61 ft)	127 m (417 ft)		0324
Rokkamura Dam			1952	17.6 m (58 ft)	256.9 m (843 ft)		0366
Sarutasawa Tameike Dam			1938	20.5 m (67 ft)	218 m (715 ft)		0346
Shaka-ike Dam			1943	21.4 m (70 ft)	140 m (460 ft)		0355
Shinzan No.1 Dam			1922	17.4 m (57 ft)	85 m (279 ft)		0330
Sodegasawa Tsutsumi Dam			1934	17.1 m (56 ft)	150.8 m (495 ft)		0336
Sotonosawa Dam		1940	1952	15 m (49 ft)	76 m (249 ft)		3392
Subari Dam		1966	1970	72 m (236 ft)	142 m (466 ft)		0382
Suganosawa Dam			1912	16 m (52 ft)	111 m (364 ft)		3389
Suginosawa Dam			1934	15.5 m (51 ft)	200 m (660 ft)		3396
Sunakozawa Dam		1985	2010	78.5 m (258 ft)	185 m (607 ft)		2919
Takikawa Dam		1984	1998	28.7 m (94 ft)	175 m (574 ft)		0399
Takinosawa Tameike Dam			1934	20.3 m (67 ft)	75 m (246 ft)		0337
Tamagawa Dam				100 m (330 ft)			0394
Tengusawanuma Dam		1928	1932	18 m (59 ft)	77 m (253 ft)		3395
Yamase Dam				62 m (203 ft)			0392
Yashio Dam			1963	27 m (89 ft)	175.4 m (575 ft)		0377
Yatsurazawa Dam			1951	16.5 m (54 ft)	226.7 m (744 ft)		0327
Yoroihata Dam		1951	1957	58.5 m (192 ft)	236 m (774 ft)		0370
Yoshida Tameike Dam			1954	18 m (59 ft)	230 m (750 ft)		3393
Yunosawa Dam		1952	1957	17.2 m (56 ft)	90 m (300 ft)		3390
Yunosawa Tameike Dam			1930	21.2 m (70 ft)	113.4 m (372 ft)		0351

== See also ==
- Media related to Dams in Akita prefecture at Wikimedia Commons
