= Kamikoani =

Kamikoani 上小阿仁村
- Village
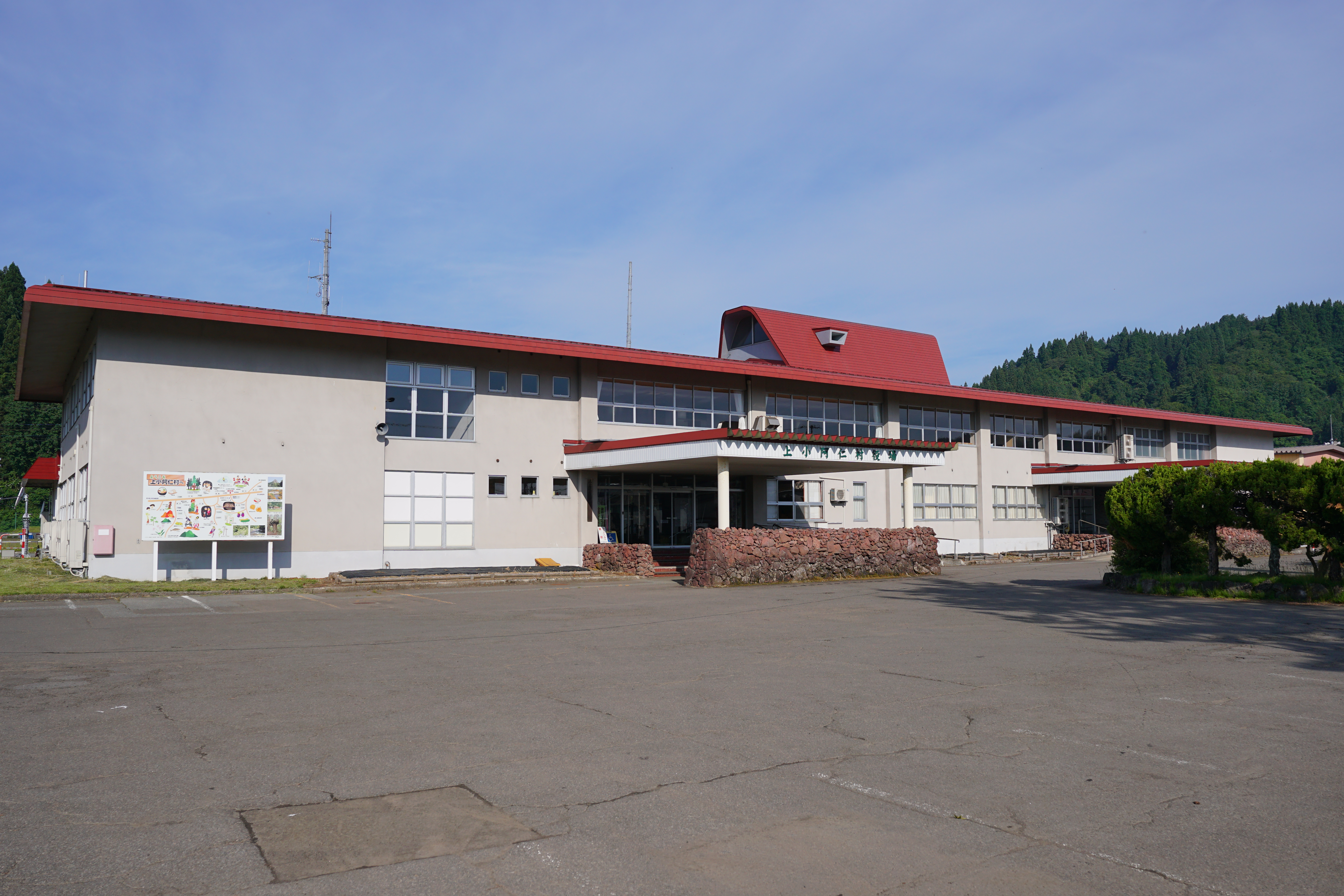
- Kamikoani Village Hall

- Flag Seal
- Interactive map of Kamikoani
- Coordinates: 40°3′48″N 140°17′45″E
- Country: Japan
- Region: Tōhoku
- Prefecture: Akita
- District: Kitaakita

Area
  - Total: 256.72 km^{2} (99.12 sq mi)

Population (February 28, 2023)
  - Total: 2,012
  - Density: 7.837/km^{2} (20.30/sq mi)
- Time zone: UTC+9 (Japan Standard Time)
- Phone number: 0186-77-2221
- Address: Kosawada-aze Mukaikawahara 118, Kamikoani-mura, Kitaakita-gun, Akita-ken 018-4494
- Website: Official website
- Symbols
- Flower: Ponerorchis kinoshitae
- Tree: Cryptomeria

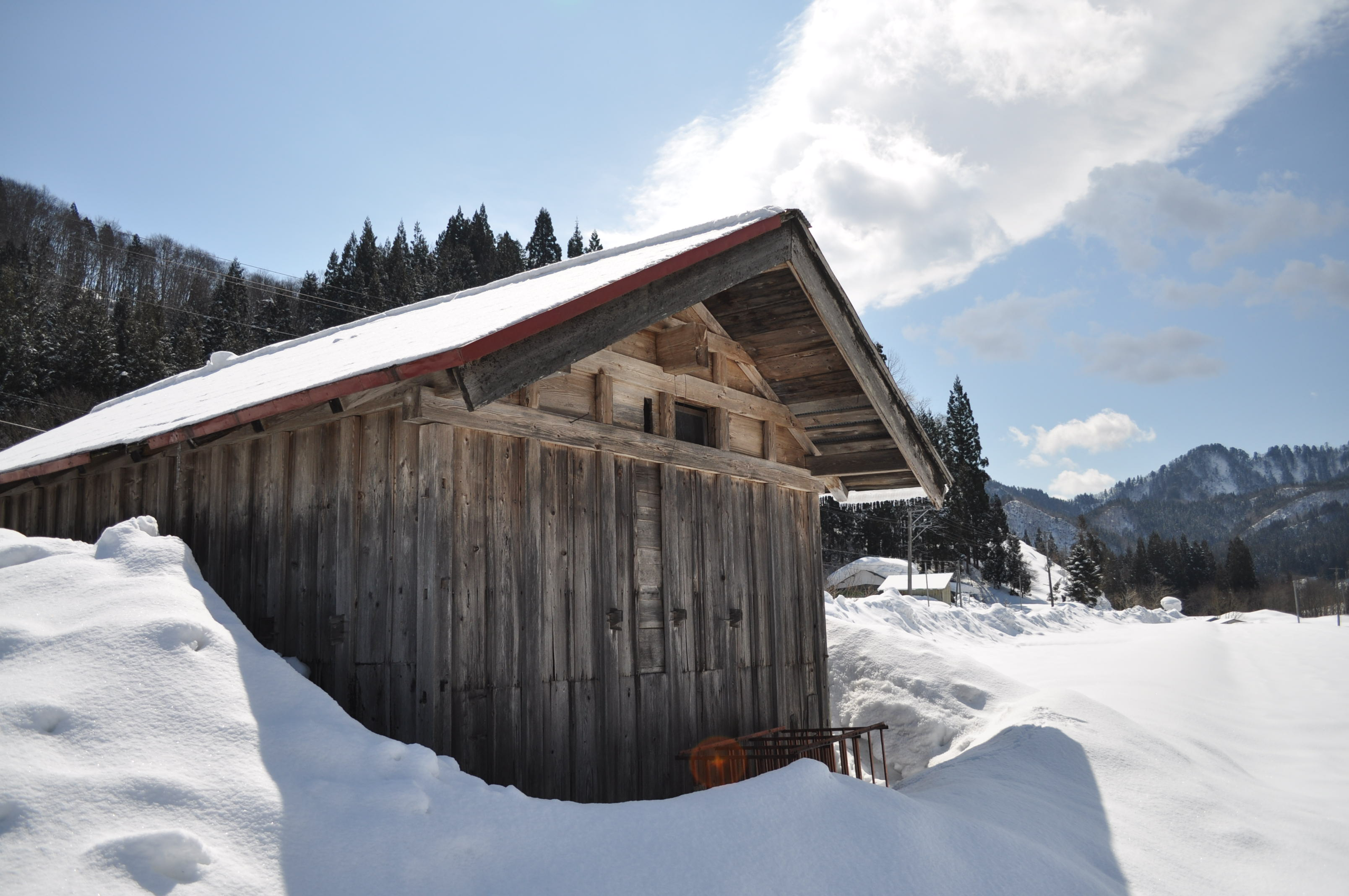
Traditional Matagi hunting shed in Yagisawa hamlet of Kamikoani

Kamikoani (上小阿仁村, Kamikoani-mura) is a village located in Akita Prefecture, Japan. As of 28 February 2023, the village had an estimated population of 2,012 in 1097 households, and a population density 7.8 persons per km^{2}. The total area of the village is 256.72 square kilometres (99.12 sq mi).

== Geography ==
Kamikoani is located in the flatlands of north-central Akita Prefecture. Due to its inland location, the village is noted for its heavy snowfall in winter.

=== Neighboring municipalities ===
Akita Prefecture

- Akita
- Gojōme
- Kitaakita
- Mitane
- Noshiro

=== Climate ===
Kamikoani has a humid continental climate (Köppen climate classification Dfa) with large seasonal temperature differences, with warm to hot (and often humid) summers and cold (sometimes severely cold) winters. Precipitation is significant throughout the year, but is heaviest from August to October. The average annual temperature in Kamikoani is 9.8 °C. The average annual rainfall is 1626 mm with September as the wettest month. The temperatures are highest on average in August, at around 23.3 °C, and lowest in January, at around -3.2 °C.

== Demographics ==
Per Japanese census data, the population of Kamikoani peaked at around the year 1960 and has been in steady decline since then.

Historical population
Year	Pop.	±%
1920	5,526	—
1930	5,302	−4.1%
1940	5,461	+3.0%
1950	6,529	+19.6%
1960	6,972	+6.8%
1970	5,242	−24.8%
1980	4,352	−17.0%
1990	3,726	−14.4%
2000	3,369	−9.6%
2010	2,747	−18.5%
2020	2,063	−24.9%

== History ==
A “Kotani Village” in Dewa Province is mentioned in records of the area from the period of Toyotomi Hideyoshi. During the Edo period, the area came under the control of the Satake clan, who ruled the northern third of the province from Kubota Domain. After the start of the Meiji period, the area became part of Kitaakita District, Akita Prefecture in 1878. The village of Kamikoani was founded on April 1, 1889, with the establishment of the modern municipalities system.

=== Physician shortage ===
The village received considerable negative publicity in the 2000s due to widely publicized issues pertaining to doctor shortages in rural areas. According to these reports, in February 2008, a male doctor who had been working in remote areas for more than 20 years started working in Kamikoani. He said "This village is the last place in my career as a doctor. I want to continue medication as I have love and interest for people." before working. In fourth month after starting, he intimated his intention of resigning, and quit two months later. In 2009, Yukiko Arisawa, a 61-year-old female doctor, started working Kamikoani, after working on isolated islands and in Thailand. She intimated her intention of resigning in March 2010, but postponed until March 2011 because of concerns that it would take time to find a replacement. For these sudden resignations, Kouhou Kamikoani, the official public relations magazine published by the village office, reported that the doctors suffered from constant harassment by the local villagers. According to the magazine, she had bullying phone calls, and her efforts were criticized. When she installed a light with a sensor in front of her house to deal with patients at night, she was accused of wasting tax money, even though she had paid for the light and the monthly electricity bill herself. Another villager said "I wonder how you could go shopping with having patients waiting." when she went to buy sandwiches because she had no time to have lunch. She managed to have only 18 holidays in 2009, but some people said "How can you have a holiday on weekdays?" and criticized when she had a holiday on August 17. And, someone scattered defamatory leaflet in front of her house.

== Government ==
Kamikoani has a mayor-council form of government with a directly elected mayor and a unicameral village legislature of seven members. Kamikoani, together with the city of Noshiro and the other municipalities of Yamamoto District contributes four members to the Akita Prefectural Assembly. In terms of national politics, the village is part of Akita District 2 of the lower house of the Diet of Japan.

== Economy ==
The economy of Kamikoani is based on agriculture.

== Education ==
Kamikoani has one combined elementary/middle school operated by the village government. The village does not have a high school.

== Transportation ==
=== Railway ===
- Kamikoani currently does not have any railway service. The nearest train station is Yonaizawa Station on the Akita Nairiku Jukan Railway Akita Nairiku Line or Takanosu Station on the JR East Ou Main Line.

=== Highway ===
- National Route 285

== Sister cities ==
- Wanluan, Pingtung County, Taiwan

== Local attractions ==
- Haginari Dam
