= Kyowa Dam =

Kyowa Dam may refer to:

- Kyowa Dam (Akita)
- Kyowa Dam (Hokkaido)
