= Matsukura =

Matsukura may refer to:

== Places ==
- Matsukura Dam, an earthfill dam in Akita Prefecture, Japan
- Matsukura Station, a railway station in Kamaishe, Iwate, Japan

== People ==
- Matsukura Katsuie (1598–1638), Japanese feudal lord
- Matsukura Shigemasa (1574–1630), Japanese feudal lord
- Naoto Matsukura (born 1993), Japanese radio-controlled car racer
- Shintaro Matsukura (born 1991), Japanese kickboxer
