= Ohuchi Dam =

Ohuchi Dam may refer to:

- Ohuchi Dam (Akita)
- Ohuchi Dam (Kagawa)
