= Ohmatsugawa Dam =

Dam in Akita Prefecture, Japan

- Location within Japan
- Location: Akita Prefecture, Japan
- Coordinates: 39°18′28″N 140°38′43″E
- Construction began: 1975
- Opening date: 1998

Dam and spillways
- Height: 65 m (213 ft)
- Length: 296 m (971 ft)

Reservoir
- Total capacity: 12,150,000 m^{3} (429,000,000 cu ft)
- Catchment area: 38.2 km^{2} (14.7 sq mi)
- Surface area: 74 hectares (180 acres)

Ohmatsugawa Dam is a gravity dam located in Akita Prefecture in Japan. The dam is used for flood control, irrigation, water supply and power production. The catchment area of the dam is 38.2 km^{2}. The dam impounds about 74 ha of land when full and can store 12150 thousand cubic meters of water. The construction of the dam was started on 1975 and completed in 1998.
