= Kohabiro Dam =

Dam in Akita Prefecture, Japan

- Location within Japan
- Location: Akita Prefecture, Japan
- Coordinates: 39°23′14″N 140°14′11″E
- Opening date: 1972

Dam and spillways
- Height: 20 m (66 ft)
- Length: 166.2 m (545 ft)

Reservoir
- Total capacity: 1,671,000 m^{3}
- Catchment area: 29.8 km^{2} (11.5 sq mi)
- Surface area: 37 ha (91 acres)

Kohabiro Dam (Japanese: 小羽広ダム) is a gravity concrete & fill dam (compound) dam located in Akita Prefecture in Japan. The dam is used for flood control. The catchment area of the dam is 29.8 km^{2} (11.5 sq mi). The dam impounds about 37 ha (91 acres) of land when full and can store 1671 thousand cubic meters of water. The construction of the dam was completed in 1972.
