= Ohtakisawa Tameike Dam =

Dam in Akita Prefecture, Japan

Ohtakisawa Tameike
- Location within Japan
- Location: Akita Prefecture, Japan
- Coordinates: 39°46′43″N 140°9′11″E
- Opening date: 1937

Dam and spillways
- Height: 26.6 m (87 ft)
- Length: 114.3 m (375 ft)

Reservoir
- Total capacity: 1,695,000 m^{3} (59,900,000 cu ft)
- Catchment area: 5.8 km^{2} (2.2 sq mi)
- Surface area: 19 hectares (47 acres)

Ohtakisawa Tameike is an earthfill dam located in Akita Prefecture in Japan. The dam is used for irrigation. The catchment area of the dam is 5.8 km^{2}. The dam impounds about 19 ha of land when full and can store 1695 thousand cubic meters of water. The construction of the dam was completed in 1937.
