= Iwami Dam =

Dam in Akita Prefecture, Japan

- Location within Japan
- Interactive map of Iwami Dam
- Location: Akita Prefecture, Japan
- Coordinates: 39°44′43″N 140°20′33″E
- Construction began: 1970
- Opening date: 1978

Dam and spillways
- Height: 66.5 m (218 ft)
- Length: 242 m (794 ft)

Reservoir
- Total capacity: 19300 thousand cubic meters
- Catchment area: 73.1 sq. km
- Surface area: 95 hectares

Iwami Dam is a gravity dam located in Akita Prefecture in Japan. The dam is used for flood control and power production. The catchment area of the dam is 73.1 km^{2}. The dam impounds about 95 ha of land when full and can store 19300 thousand cubic meters of water. The construction of the dam was started on 1970 and completed in 1978.
