= Moriyoshizan Dam =

Dam in Akita Prefecture, Japan

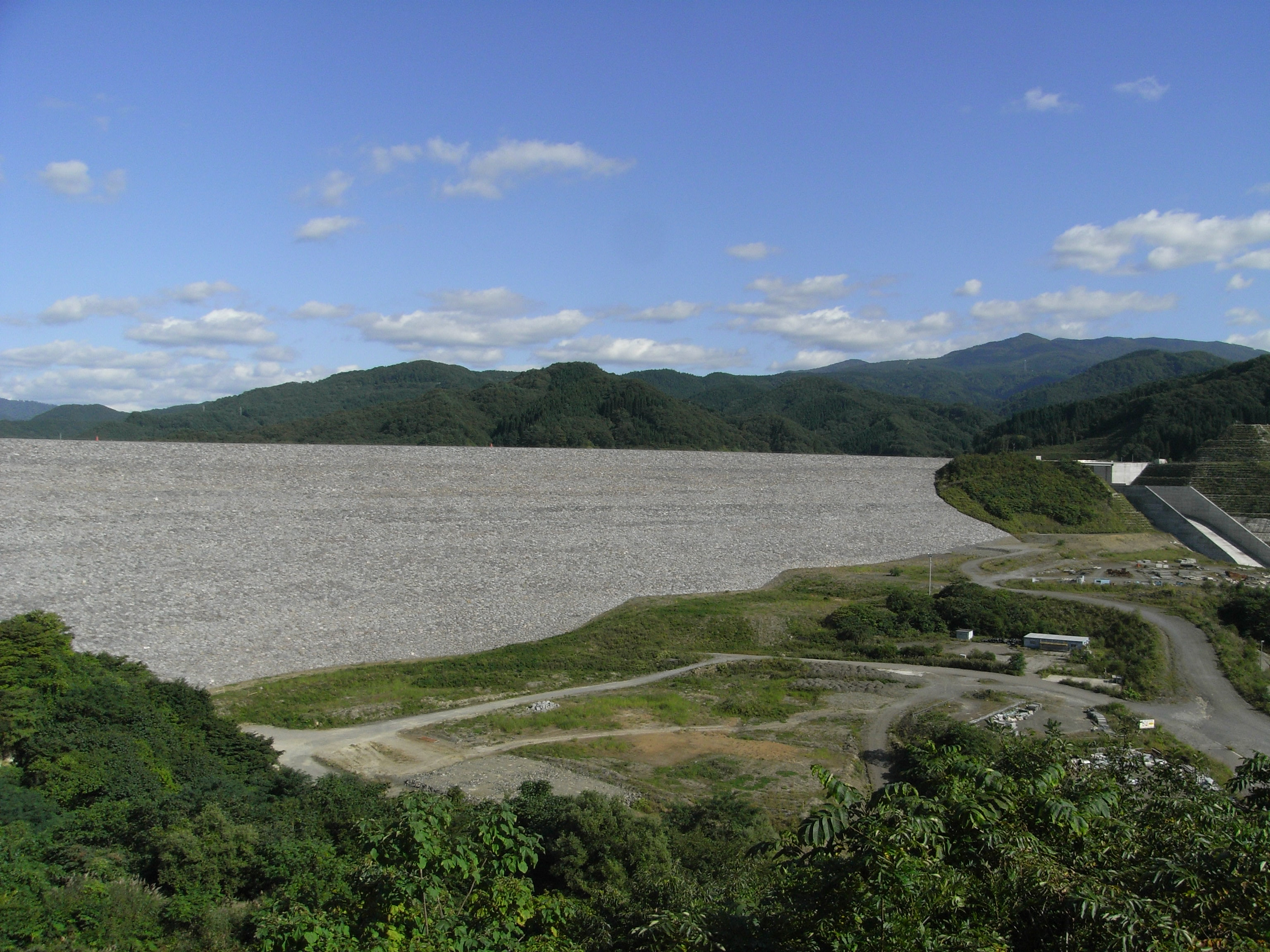

- Location within Japan
- Location: Akita Prefecture, Japan
- Coordinates: 40°2′09″N 140°27′28″E
- Construction began: 1973
- Opening date: 2011

Dam and spillways
- Height: 89.9 m (295 ft)
- Length: 786 m (2,579 ft)

Reservoir
- Total capacity: 78100 thousand cubic meters
- Catchment area: 248 sq. km
- Surface area: 320 hectares

Moriyoshizan Dam is located at 31 Himegadai, Nemorita, Kitaakita, Akita Prefecture, Japan and was constructed in the middle reaches of the Komata River, which is part of the Yoneshiro River system. The Moriyoshi Dam is constructed upstream.

The Yoneshiro River basin is rich in forest and mineral resources, and before land transportation developed, goods were transported mainly by boat. However, the basin has often flooded due to heavy rains, and it has also been known as a violent river that threatens the lives and property of the people living in the basin. In July 1972, the Yoneshiro River area was hit by the largest flood since the war, causing extensive damage. This flood was the trigger for the construction of Moriyoshizan Dam. The survey office was established in 1973, and the Moriyoshiyama Dam was completed in 2011 after 39 years of construction.

== History ==
- July 1972 - The largest flood since the war occurred in the Yoneshiro River basin.
- April 1973 - The Anigawa Dam Research Office was opened. Started survey of implementation plan.
- April 1988 - Renamed to Moriyoshiyama Dam Construction Office.
- June 1991 - Signed "Agreement on General Compensation for the Moriyoshiyama Dam Construction Project" and agreed standards.
- April 1996 - Completed relocation of all households (total of 200 households).
- March 2001 - Started construction of the dam main body.
- September 2001 - Opened "Moriyoshiyama Dam Public Relations Center".
- November 2003 - Diversion of Komata River to a temporary drainage tunnel.
- June 2005 - Moriyoshiyama Dam cornerstone laying ceremony.
- October 2006 - Spillway concrete pouring completed.
- August 2007 - Embankment banking completed.
- September 2007 - Major flood occurs, with water levels exceeding those of the 1972 flood (in the lower reaches of the Yoneshiro River, flood control measures meant that damage was less than that of the 1972 flood, but it is believed that damage would have been even less if Moriyoshiyama Dam had been completed).
- May 2008 - All replacement prefectural roads opened.
- January 2010 - Test impoundment begins.
- January 2011 - Test impoundment ends.
- April 2012 - Moriyoshiyama Dam Management Office begins management.

== Purpose ==
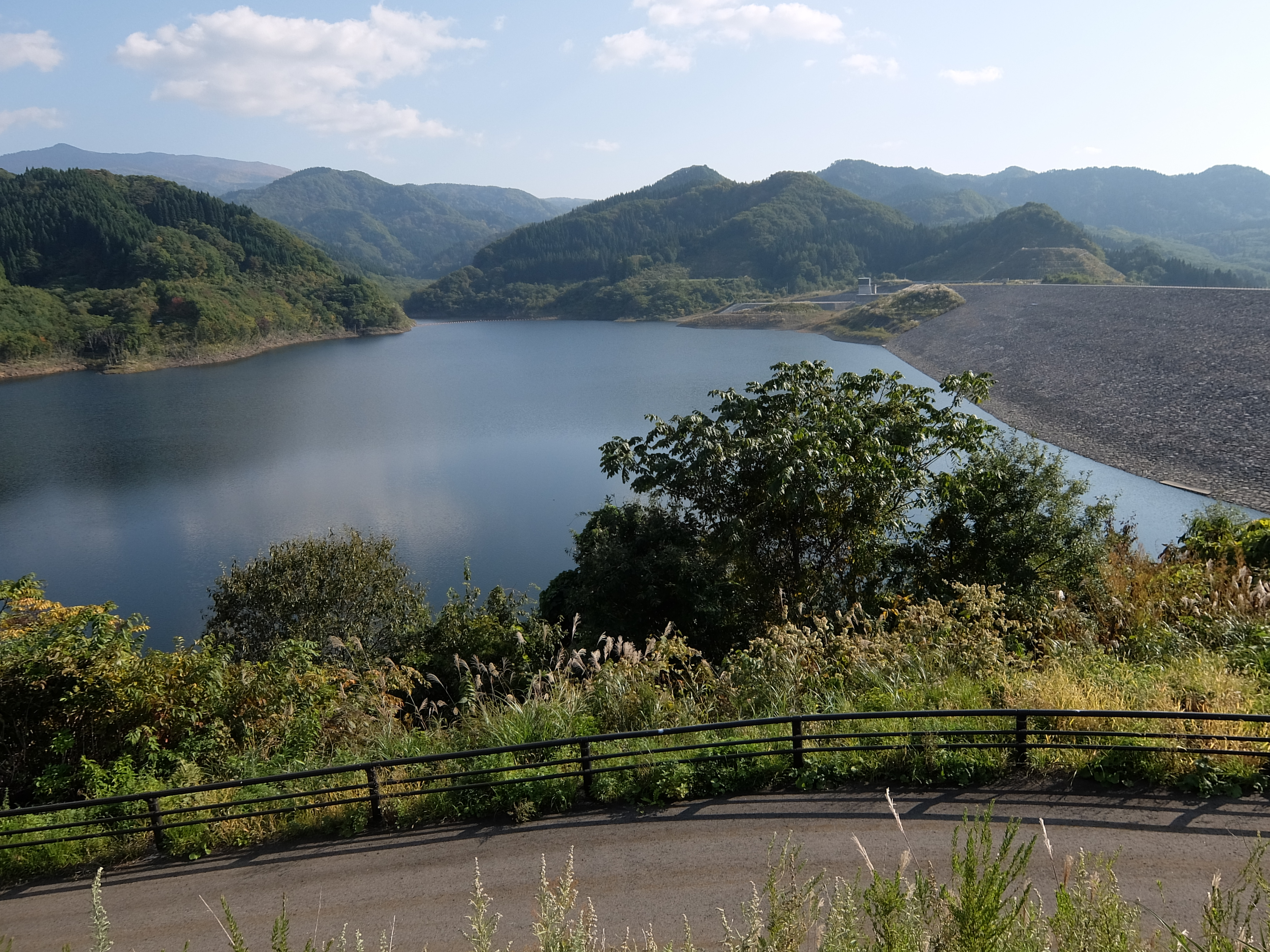
Moriyoshi Shikibi Lake. The mountain in the background on the left is Mt. Moriyoshi

The purpose of the Moriyoshiyama Dam is to "control floods," "maintain normal functioning of running water," "supply irrigation water," "supply water for drinking water," and "power generation."

For irrigation water, it secures the necessary amount of water to supply a maximum intake of 0.145m^{3}/s and a total annual intake of 793,100m^{3} for irrigation water required for the development of about 200ha of farmland in the Onodai area of Kitaakita City as part of the "Prefectural Comprehensive Development Project for Cultivating Farmers."

For drinking water supply, it makes it possible to supply up to 9,500m^{3} of water per day to the former Aikawa-cho and former Moriyoshi-cho in Kitaakita City.

For power generation, it makes it possible to generate a maximum of 11,200kW of power. This is equivalent to the total power generation of all households in Kitaakita City and Kamikoani Village (based on the assumption that one household uses approximately 280kW per month).
