= Shaka-ike Dam =

Dam in Akita Prefecture, Japan

Shaka-ike
- Location within Japan
- Location: Akita Prefecture, Japan
- Coordinates: 40°19′45″N 140°36′11″E
- Opening date: 1943

Dam and spillways
- Height: 21.4 m (70 ft)
- Length: 140 m (460 ft)

Reservoir
- Total capacity: 1,500,000 m^{3} (53,000,000 cu ft)
- Catchment area: 7.1 km^{2} (2.7 sq mi)
- Surface area: 23 hectares (57 acres)

Shaka-ike is an earthfill dam located in Akita Prefecture in Japan. The dam is used for irrigation. The catchment area of the dam is 7.1 km^{2}. The dam impounds about 23 ha of land when full and can store 1500 thousand cubic meters of water. The construction of the dam was completed in 1943.
