= Ohdutsumi Dam =

Dam in Akita Prefecture, Japan

- Location within Japan
- Location: Akita Prefecture, Japan
- Coordinates: 39°57′07″N 139°45′46″E
- Opening date: 1921

Dam and spillways
- Height: 15.6 m (51 ft)
- Length: 133 m (436 ft)

Reservoir
- Total capacity: 273,000 m^{3} (9,600,000 cu ft)
- Catchment area: 1.6 km^{2} (0.62 sq mi)
- Surface area: 6 hectares (15 acres)

Ohdutsumi Dam is an earthfill dam located in Akita Prefecture in Japan. The dam is used for irrigation. The catchment area of the dam is 1.6 km^{2}. The dam impounds about 6 ha of land when full and can store 273 thousand cubic meters of water. The construction of the dam was completed in 1921.
