= Hotta Tameike Dam =

Dam in Akita Prefecture, Japan

- Location within Japan
- Interactive map of Hotta Tameike Dam
- Location: Akita Prefecture, Japan
- Coordinates: 39°48′48″N 140°7′06″E
- Opening date: 1956

Dam and spillways
- Height: 22.6 m (74 ft)
- Length: 160 m (520 ft)

Reservoir
- Total capacity: 672 thousand cubic meters
- Catchment area: 0.2 sq. km
- Surface area: 7 hectares

Hotta Tameike Dam is an earthfill dam located in Akita Prefecture in Japan. The dam is used for irrigation. The catchment area of the dam is 0.2 km^{2}. The dam impounds about 7 ha of land when full and can store 672 thousand cubic meters of water. The construction of the dam was completed in 1956.
