= Matsumine Tameike Dam =

Dam in Akita Prefecture, Japan

Matsumine Tameike (Re)
- Location within Japan
- Location: Akita Prefecture, Japan
- Coordinates: 40°18′43″N 140°32′26″E
- Construction began: 1982
- Opening date: 1992

Dam and spillways
- Height: 19.9 m (65 ft)
- Length: 120 m (390 ft)

Reservoir
- Total capacity: 210 thousand cubic meters
- Catchment area: 0.7 sq. km
- Surface area: 3 hectares

Matsumine Tameike (Re) is an earthfill dam located in Akita Prefecture in Japan. The dam is used for irrigation. The catchment area of the dam is 0.7 km^{2}. The dam impounds about 3 ha of land when full and can store 210 thousand cubic meters of water. The construction of the dam was started on 1982 and completed in 1992.
