= Mizusawa Dam =

Dam in Akita Prefecture, Japan

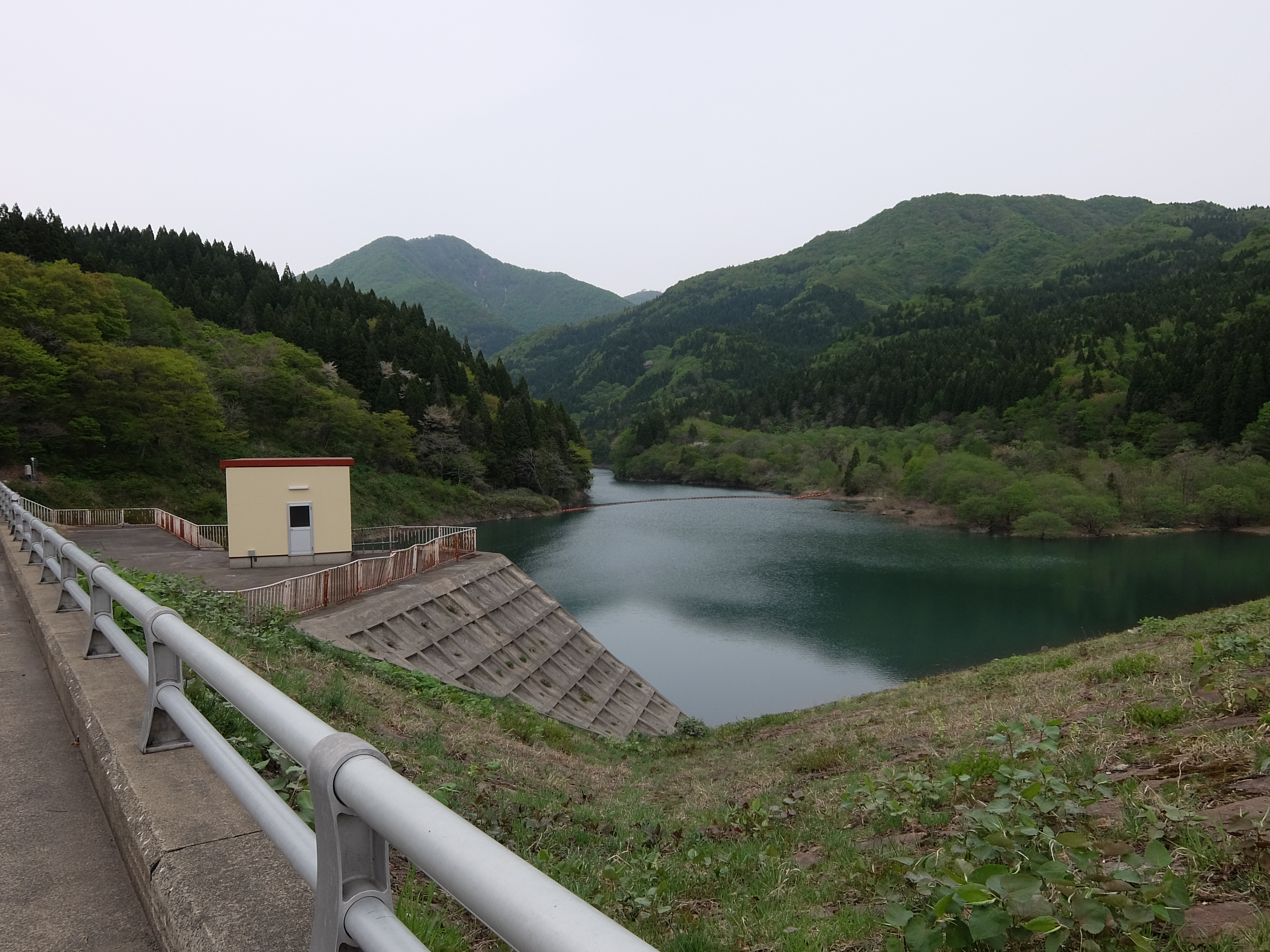

- Location within Japan
- Location: Akita Prefecture, Japan
- Coordinates: 40°21′35″N 140°5′54″E
- Construction began: 1975
- Opening date: 1994

Dam and spillways
- Height: 46.5 m (153 ft)
- Length: 235 m (771 ft)

Reservoir
- Total capacity: 3001 thousand cubic meters
- Catchment area: 27 sq. km
- Surface area: 24 hectares

Mizusawa Dam is a rockfill dam located in Akita Prefecture in Japan. The dam is used for flood control and irrigation. The catchment area of the dam is 27 km^{2}. The dam impounds about 24 ha of land when full and can store 3001 thousand cubic meters of water. The construction of the dam was started on 1975 and completed in 1994.
