= Shinzan No.1 Dam =

Dam in Akita Prefecture, Japan

- Location within Japan
- Location: Akita Prefecture, Japan
- Coordinates: 39°55′49″N 139°46′23″E
- Opening date: 1922

Dam and spillways
- Height: 17.4 m (57 ft)
- Length: 85 m (279 ft)

Reservoir
- Total capacity: 70,000 m^{3} (2,500,000 cu ft)
- Catchment area: 1 km^{2} (0.39 sq mi)
- Surface area: 1 hectare (2.5 acres)

Shinzan No.1 Dam is an earthfill dam located in Akita Prefecture in Japan. The dam is used for irrigation. The catchment area of the dam is 1 km^{2}. The dam impounds about 1 ha of land when full and can store 70 thousand cubic meters of water. The construction of the dam was completed in 1922.
