= Kanezawa Tameike Dam =

Dam in Akita Prefecture, Japan

Kanezawa Tameike
- Location within Japan
- Interactive map of Kanezawa Tameike
- Location: Akita Prefecture, Japan
- Coordinates: 39°22′43″N 140°35′12″E
- Opening date: 1980

Dam and spillways
- Height: 29.2 m (96 ft)
- Length: 190.4 m (625 ft)

Reservoir
- Total capacity: 702 thousand cubic meters
- Catchment area: 4.4 sq. km
- Surface area: 60 hectares

Kanezawa Tameike is an earthfill dam located in Akita Prefecture in Japan. The dam is used for irrigation. The catchment area of the dam is 4.4 km^{2}. The dam impounds about 60 ha of land when full and can store 702 thousand cubic meters of water. The construction of the dam was completed in 1980.
