= Asahikawa Dam =

Dam in Akita Prefecture, Japan

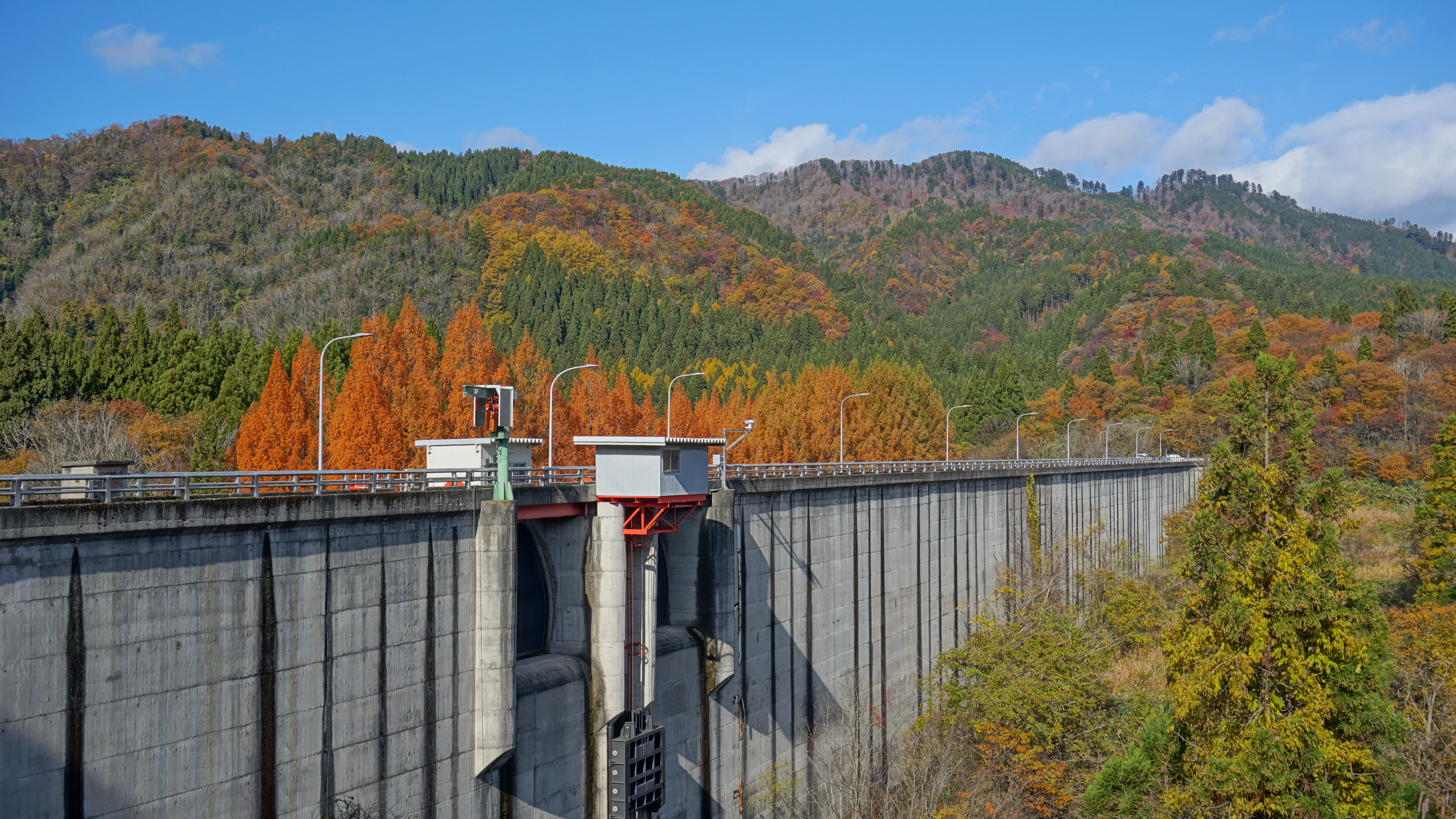

- Location within Japan
- Interactive map of Asahikawa Dam
- Location: Akita Prefecture, Japan
- Coordinates: 39°48′07″N 140°13′00″E
- Construction began: 1967
- Opening date: 1972

Dam and spillways
- Height: 51.5 m (169 ft)
- Length: 380 m (1,250 ft)

Reservoir
- Total capacity: 5200 thousand cubic meters
- Catchment area: 34.4 sq. km
- Surface area: 35 hectares

Asahikawa Dam is a gravity dam located in Akita Prefecture in Japan. The dam is used for flood control. The catchment area of the dam is 34.4 km^{2}. The dam impounds about 35 ha of land when full and can store 5200 thousand cubic meters of water. The construction of the dam was started on 1967 and completed in 1972.
