= Ohyoshizawa Tameike Dam =

Dam in Akita Prefecture, Japan

Ohyoshizawa Tameike
- Location within Japan
- Location: Akita Prefecture, Japan
- Coordinates: 39°58′06″N 140°9′01″E
- Opening date: 1934

Dam and spillways
- Height: 18.5 m (61 ft)
- Length: 127 m (417 ft)

Reservoir
- Total capacity: 726,000 m^{3} (25,600,000 cu ft)
- Catchment area: 2.1 km^{2} (0.81 sq mi)
- Surface area: 8 hectares (20 acres)

Ohyoshizawa Tameike is an earthfill dam located in Akita Prefecture in Japan. The dam is used for irrigation. The catchment area of the dam is 2.1 km^{2}. The dam impounds about 8 ha of land when full and can store 726 thousand cubic meters of water. The construction of the dam was completed in 1934.
