= Etsuri Dam =

Dam in Akita Prefecture, Japan

- Location within Japan
- Interactive map of Etsuri Dam
- Location: Akita Prefecture, Japan
- Coordinates: 40°15′14″N 140°35′04″E
- Opening date: 1949

Dam and spillways
- Height: 17.7 m (58 ft)
- Length: 79.6 m (261 ft)

Reservoir
- Total capacity: 160 thousand cubic meters
- Catchment area: 3.6 sq. km
- Surface area: 4 hectares

Etsuri Dam is an earthfill dam located in Akita Prefecture in Japan. The dam is used for irrigation. The catchment area of the dam is 3.6 km^{2}. The dam impounds about 4 ha of land when full and can store 160 thousand cubic meters of water. The construction of the dam was completed in 1949.
