= Hokiden Tameike Dam =

Dam in Akita Prefecture, Japan

Hokiden Tameike
- Location within Japan
- Interactive map of Hokiden Tameike
- Location: Akita Prefecture, Japan
- Coordinates: 39°48′59″N 140°6′56″E
- Opening date: 1938

Dam and spillways
- Height: 25.7 m (84 ft)
- Length: 104 m (341 ft)

Reservoir
- Total capacity: 341 thousand cubic meters
- Catchment area: 14.7 sq. km
- Surface area: 4 hectares

Hokiden Tameike is an earthfill dam located in Akita Prefecture in Japan. The dam is used for irrigation. The catchment area of the dam is 14.7 km^{2}. The dam impounds about 4 ha of land when full and can store 341 thousand cubic meters of water. The construction of the dam was completed in 1938.
