= Iwagami Dam =

Dam in Akita Prefecture, Japan

- Location within Japan
- Interactive map of Iwagami Dam
- Location: Akita Prefecture, Japan
- Coordinates: 40°16′39″N 140°35′40″E
- Opening date: 1969

Dam and spillways
- Height: 23.3 m (76 ft)
- Length: 130 m (430 ft)

Reservoir
- Total capacity: 665 thousand cubic meters
- Catchment area: 1.6 sq. km
- Surface area: 8 hectares

Iwagami Dam is an earthfill dam located in Akita Prefecture in Japan. The dam is used for irrigation. The catchment area of the dam is 1.6 km^{2}. The dam impounds about 8 ha of land when full and can store 665 thousand cubic meters of water. The construction of the dam was completed in 1969.
