= Subari Dam =

Dam in Akita Prefecture, Japan

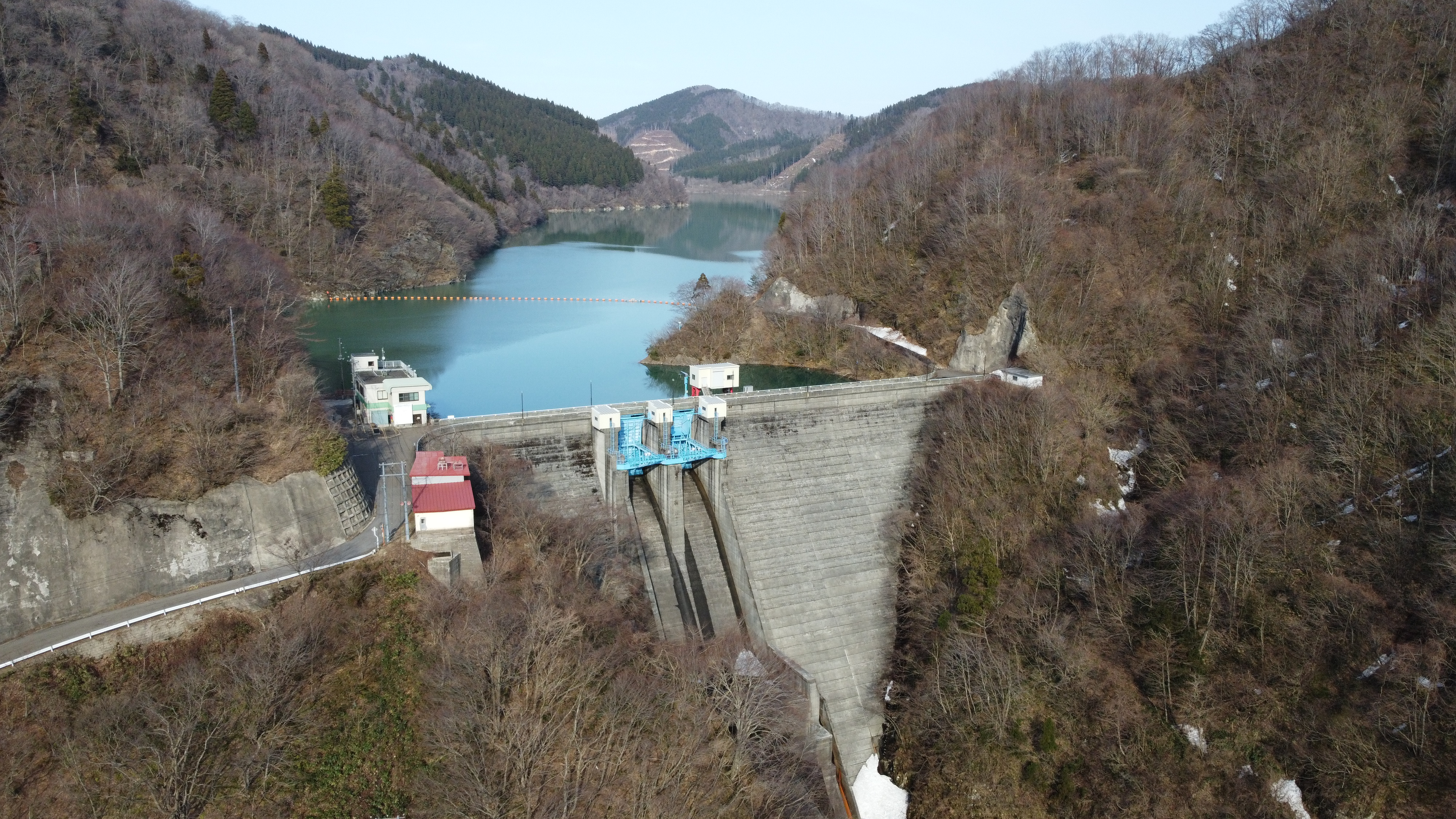

- Location within Japan
- Location: Akita Prefecture, Japan
- Coordinates: 40°20′00″N 140°13′22″E
- Construction began: 1966
- Opening date: 1970

Dam and spillways
- Height: 72 m (236 ft)
- Length: 142 m (466 ft)

Reservoir
- Total capacity: 42,500,000 m^{3} (1.50×10^{9} cu ft)
- Catchment area: 100 km^{2} (39 sq mi)
- Surface area: 192 hectares (470 acres)

Subari Dam is a gravity dam located in Akita Prefecture in Japan. The dam is used for flood control, irrigation and power production. The catchment area of the dam is 100 km^{2}. The dam impounds about 192 ha of land when full and can store 42500 thousand cubic meters of water. The construction of the dam was started on 1966 and completed in 1970.
