= Bessho Tameike Dam =

Dam in Akita Prefecture, Japan

Bessho Tameike
- Location within Japan
- Interactive map of Bessho Tameike
- Location: Akita Prefecture, Japan
- Coordinates: 40°12′41″N 140°41′36″E
- Opening date: 1957

Dam and spillways
- Height: 19 m (62 ft)
- Length: 102.5 m (336 ft)

Reservoir
- Total capacity: 212 thousand cubic meters
- Catchment area: 2.6 sq. km
- Surface area: 3 hectares

Bessho Tameike is an earthfill dam located in Akita Prefecture in Japan. The dam is used for irrigation. The catchment area of the dam is 2.6 km^{2}. The dam impounds about 3 ha of land when full and can store 212 thousand cubic meters of water. The construction of the dam was and completed in 1957.
