= Hotokezawa Dam =

Dam in Akita Prefecture, Japan

- Location within Japan
- Interactive map of Hotokezawa Dam
- Location: Akita Prefecture, Japan
- Coordinates: 39°25′48″N 140°36′50″E
- Opening date: 1935

Dam and spillways
- Height: 24.7 m (81 ft)
- Length: 180 m (590 ft)

Reservoir
- Total capacity: 1128 thousand cubic meters
- Catchment area: 14.1 sq. km
- Surface area: 14 hectares

Hotokezawa Dam is an earthfill dam located in Akita Prefecture in Japan. The dam is used for irrigation. The catchment area of the dam is 14.1 km^{2}. The dam impounds about 14 ha of land when full and can store 1128 thousand cubic meters of water. The construction of the dam was completed in 1935.
