= Hanekawa Dam =

Dam in Akita Prefecture, Japan

- Location within Japan
- Interactive map of Hanekawa Dam
- Location: Akita Prefecture, Japan
- Coordinates: 40°3′33″N 140°6′28″E
- Opening date: 1967

Dam and spillways
- Height: 17.7 m (58 ft)
- Length: 138.7 m (455 ft)

Reservoir
- Total capacity: 855 thousand cubic meters
- Catchment area: 1.7 sq. km
- Surface area: 14 hectares

Hanekawa Dam is an earthfill dam located in Akita Prefecture in Japan. The dam is used for irrigation. The catchment area of the dam is 1.7 km^{2}. The dam impounds about 14 ha of land when full and can store 855 thousand cubic meters of water. The construction of the dam was completed in 1967.
