= Yunosawa Dam =

Dam in Akita Prefecture, Japan

- Location within Japan
- Location: Akita Prefecture, Japan
- Coordinates: 40°12′10″N 140°10′05″E
- Construction began: 1952
- Opening date: 1957

Dam and spillways
- Height: 17.2 m (56 ft)
- Length: 90 m (300 ft)

Reservoir
- Total capacity: 200,000 m^{3} (7,100,000 cu ft)
- Catchment area: 1.1 km^{2} (0.42 sq mi)
- Surface area: 3 hectares (7.4 acres)

Yunosawa Dam is an earthfill dam located in Akita Prefecture in Japan. The dam is used for irrigation. The catchment area of the dam is 1.1 km^{2}. The dam impounds about 3 ha of land when full and can store 200 thousand cubic meters of water. The construction of the dam was started on 1952 and completed in 1957.
