= Yatsurazawa Dam =

Dam in Akita Prefecture, Japan

- Location within Japan
- Location: Akita Prefecture, Japan
- Coordinates: 40°10′19″N 140°35′22″E
- Opening date: 1951

Dam and spillways
- Height: 16.5 m (54 ft)
- Length: 226.7 m (744 ft)

Reservoir
- Total capacity: 681,000 m^{3} (24,000,000 cu ft)
- Catchment area: 1 km^{2} (0.39 sq mi)
- Surface area: 10 hectares (25 acres)

Yatsurazawa Dam is an earthfill dam located in Akita Prefecture in Japan. The dam is used for irrigation. The catchment area of the dam is 1 km^{2}. The dam impounds about 10 ha of land when full and can store 681 thousand cubic meters of water. The construction of the dam was completed in 1951.
