= Ichijogi Dam =

Dam in Akita Prefecture, Japan

- Location within Japan
- Interactive map of Ichijogi Dam
- Location: Akita Prefecture, Japan
- Coordinates: 39°27′59″N 140°36′22″E
- Opening date: 1938

Dam and spillways
- Height: 18.5 m (61 ft)
- Length: 203 m (666 ft)

Reservoir
- Total capacity: 753 thousand cubic meters
- Catchment area: 9.8 sq. km
- Surface area: 11 hectares

Ichijogi Dam is an earthfill dam located in Akita Prefecture in Japan. The dam is used for irrigation. The catchment area of the dam is 9.8 km^{2}. The dam impounds about 11 ha of land when full and can store 753 thousand cubic meters of water. The construction of the dam was completed in 1938.
