= Yoroihata Dam =

Dam in Akita Prefecture, Japan

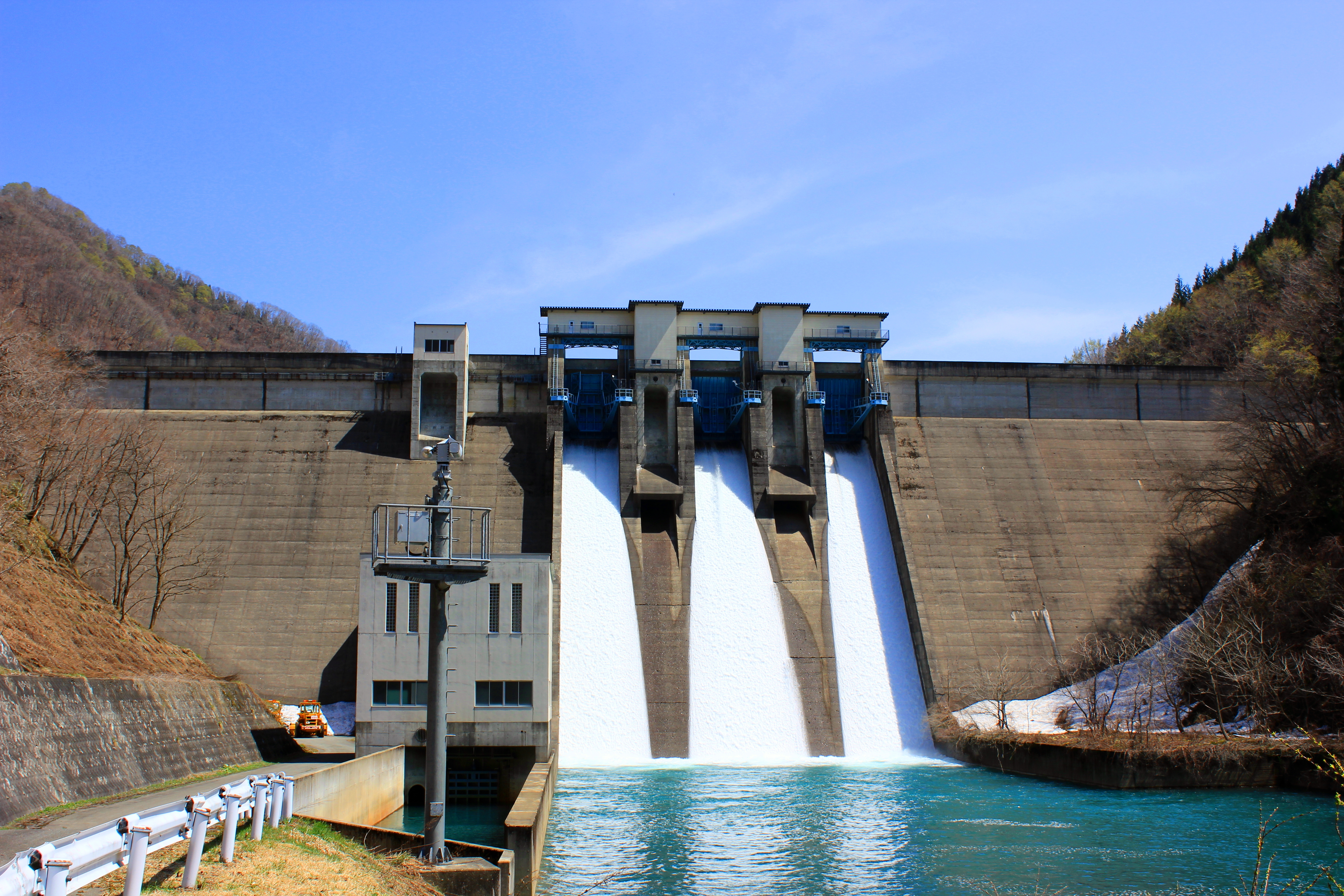

- Location within Japan
- Location: Akita Prefecture, Japan
- Coordinates: 39°47′24″N 140°39′13″E
- Construction began: 1951
- Opening date: 1957

Dam and spillways
- Height: 58.5 m (192 ft)
- Length: 236 m (774 ft)

Reservoir
- Total capacity: 51,000,000 m^{3} (1.8×10^{9} cu ft)
- Catchment area: 320.3 km^{2} (123.7 sq mi)
- Surface area: 255 hectares (630 acres)

Yoroihata Dam is a gravity dam located in Akita Prefecture in Japan. The dam is used for flood control and power production. The catchment area of the dam is 320.3 km^{2}. The dam impounds about 255 ha of land when full and can store 51000 thousand cubic meters of water. The construction of the dam was started on 1951 and completed in 1957.
