= Sotonosawa Dam =

Dam in Akita Prefecture, Japan

- Location within Japan
- Location: Akita Prefecture, Japan
- Coordinates: 40°3′44″N 140°7′51″E
- Construction began: 1940
- Opening date: 1952

Dam and spillways
- Height: 15 m (49 ft)
- Length: 76 m (249 ft)

Reservoir
- Total capacity: 410,000 m^{3} (14,000,000 cu ft)
- Catchment area: 1 km^{2} (0.39 sq mi)
- Surface area: 8 hectares (20 acres)

Sotonosawa Dam is an earthfill dam located in Akita Prefecture in Japan. The dam is used for irrigation. The catchment area of the dam is 1 km^{2}. The dam impounds about 8 ha of land when full and can store 410 thousand cubic meters of water. The construction of the dam was started on 1940 and completed in 1952.
