= Yunosawa Tameike Dam =

Dam in Akita Prefecture, Japan

Yunosawa Tameike
- Location within Japan
- Location: Akita Prefecture, Japan
- Coordinates: 39°11′46″N 140°37′26″E
- Opening date: 1930

Dam and spillways
- Height: 21.2 m (70 ft)
- Length: 113.4 m (372 ft)

Reservoir
- Total capacity: 439,000 m^{3} (15,500,000 cu ft)
- Catchment area: 1.7 km^{2} (0.66 sq mi)
- Surface area: 4 hectares (9.9 acres)

Yunosawa Tameike is an earthfill dam located in Akita Prefecture in Japan. The dam is used for irrigation. The catchment area of the dam is 1.7 km^{2}. The dam impounds about 4 ha of land when full and can store 439 thousand cubic meters of water. The construction of the dam was completed in 1930.
