= Akazawa Dam =

Dam in Akita Prefecture, Japan

- Location within Japan
- Location: Akita Prefecture, Japan
- Coordinates: 39°9′56″N 140°21′08″E
- Opening date: 1935

Dam and spillways
- Height: 19.3 m (63 ft)
- Length: 72.7 m (239 ft)

Reservoir
- Total capacity: 338 thousand cubic meters
- Catchment area: 1.5 sq. km
- Surface area: 4 hectares

Akazawa Dam is an earthfill dam located in Akita Prefecture in Japan. The dam is used for irrigation. The catchment area of the dam is 1.5 km^{2}. The dam impounds about 4 ha of land when full and can store 338 thousand cubic meters of water. The construction of the dam was completed in 1935.
