= Ohuchi Dam (Akita) =

Dam in Akita Prefecture, Japan

- Location within Japan
- Location: Akita Prefecture, Japan
- Coordinates: 39°26′12″N 140°15′20″E
- Construction began: 1991
- Opening date: 2007

Dam and spillways
- Height: 27.5 m (90 ft)
- Length: 106 m (348 ft)

Reservoir
- Total capacity: 724,000 m^{3} (25,600,000 cu ft)
- Catchment area: 3.4 km^{2} (1.3 sq mi)
- Surface area: 13 hectares (32 acres)

Ohuchi Dam is a gravity dam located in Akita Prefecture in Japan. The dam is used for flood control and water supply. The catchment area of the dam is 3.4 km^{2}. The dam impounds about 13 ha of land when full and can store 724 thousand cubic meters of water. The construction of the dam was started on 1991 and completed in 2007.
