= Jindai Dam =

Dam in Akita Prefecture, Japan

- Location within Japan
- Interactive map of Jindai Dam
- Location: Akita Prefecture, Japan
- Coordinates: 39°37′48″N 140°41′11″E
- Construction began: 1938
- Opening date: 1940

Dam and spillways
- Height: 26.5 m (87 ft)
- Length: 178 m (584 ft)

Reservoir
- Total capacity: 5108 thousand cubic meters
- Catchment area: 643.6 sq. km
- Surface area: 62 hectares

Jindai Dam is a gravity dam located in Akita Prefecture in Japan. The dam is used for power production. The catchment area of the dam is 643.6 km^{2}. The dam impounds about 62 ha of land when full and can store 5108 thousand cubic meters of water. The construction of the dam was started on 1938 and completed in 1940.
