= Kuzugasawa Dam =

Dam in Akita Prefecture, Japan

- Location within Japan
- Location: Akita Prefecture, Japan
- Coordinates: 39°21′34″N 140°23′11″E
- Opening date: 1943

Dam and spillways
- Height: 18.8 m (62 ft)
- Length: 120 m (390 ft)

Reservoir
- Total capacity: 650 thousand cubic meters
- Catchment area: 1.8 sq. km
- Surface area: 10 hectares

Kuzugasawa Dam is an earthfill dam located in Akita Prefecture in Japan. The dam is used for irrigation. The catchment area of the dam is 1.8 km^{2}. The dam impounds about 10 ha of land when full and can store 650 thousand cubic meters of water. The construction of the dam was completed in 1943.
