= Tengusawanuma Dam =

Dam in Akita Prefecture, Japan

- Location within Japan
- Location: Akita Prefecture, Japan
- Coordinates: 39°20′54″N 140°34′54″E
- Construction began: 1928
- Opening date: 1932

Dam and spillways
- Height: 18 m (59 ft)
- Length: 77 m (253 ft)

Reservoir
- Total capacity: 130,000 m^{3} (4,600,000 cu ft)
- Catchment area: 78.6 km^{2} (30.3 sq mi)
- Surface area: 2 hectares (4.9 acres)

Tengusawanuma Dam is an earthfill dam located in Akita Prefecture in Japan. The dam is used for irrigation. The catchment area of the dam is 78.6 km^{2}. The dam impounds about 2 ha of land when full and can store 130 thousand cubic meters of water. The construction of the dam was started on 1928 and completed in 1932.
