= Rokkamura Dam =

Dam in Akita Prefecture, Japan

- Location within Japan
- Location: Akita Prefecture, Japan
- Coordinates: 39°25′05″N 140°6′05″E
- Opening date: 1952

Dam and spillways
- Height: 17.6 m (58 ft)
- Length: 256.9 m (843 ft)

Reservoir
- Total capacity: 1,790,000 m^{3} (63,000,000 cu ft)
- Catchment area: 12.7 km^{2} (4.9 sq mi)
- Surface area: 24 hectares (59 acres)

Rokkamura Dam is an earthfill dam located in Akita Prefecture in Japan. The dam is used for irrigation. The catchment area of the dam is 12.7 km^{2}. The dam impounds about 24 ha of land when full and can store 1790 thousand cubic meters of water. The construction of the dam was completed in 1952.
