= Ohbuka Dam =

Dam in Akita Prefecture, Japan

- Location within Japan
- Location: Akita Prefecture, Japan
- Coordinates: 39°55′42″N 140°47′56″E
- Construction began: 1958
- Opening date: 1961

Dam and spillways
- Height: 21.6 m (71 ft)
- Length: 53.5 m (176 ft)

Reservoir
- Total capacity: 137,000 m^{3} (4,800,000 cu ft)
- Catchment area: 59.5 km^{2} (23.0 sq mi)
- Surface area: 20 hectares (49 acres)

Ohbuka Dam is a gravity dam located in Akita Prefecture in Japan. The dam is used for power production. The catchment area of the dam is 59.5 km^{2}. The dam impounds about 20 ha of land when full and can store 137 thousand cubic meters of water. The construction of the dam was started on 1958 and completed in 1961.
