= Suginosawa Dam =

Dam in Akita Prefecture, Japan

- Location within Japan
- Location: Akita Prefecture, Japan
- Coordinates: 39°23′41″N 140°25′36″E
- Opening date: 1934

Dam and spillways
- Height: 15.5 m (51 ft)
- Length: 200 m (660 ft)

Reservoir
- Total capacity: 594,000 m^{3} (21,000,000 cu ft)
- Catchment area: 0.2 km^{2} (0.077 sq mi)
- Surface area: 10 hectares (25 acres)

Suginosawa Dam is an earthfill dam located in Akita Prefecture in Japan. The dam is used for irrigation. The catchment area of the dam is 0.2 km^{2}. The dam impounds about 10 ha of land when full and can store 594 thousand cubic meters of water. The construction of the dam was completed in 1934.
