= Sodegasawa Tsutsumi Dam =

Dam in Akita Prefecture, Japan

Sodegasawa Tsutsumi
- Location within Japan
- Location: Akita Prefecture, Japan
- Coordinates: 39°55′28″N 140°9′42″E
- Opening date: 1934

Dam and spillways
- Height: 17.1 m (56 ft)
- Length: 150.8 m (495 ft)

Reservoir
- Total capacity: 783,000 m^{3} (27,700,000 cu ft)
- Catchment area: 2.3 km^{2} (0.89 sq mi)
- Surface area: 12 hectares (30 acres)

Sodegasawa Tsutsumi is an earthfill dam located in Akita Prefecture in Japan. The dam is used for irrigation. The catchment area of the dam is 2.3 km^{2}. The dam impounds about 12 ha of land when full and can store 783 thousand cubic meters of water. The construction of the dam was completed in 1934.
