= Karasawa No.1 Dam =

Dam in Akita Prefecture, Japan

- Location within Japan
- Interactive map of Karasawa No.1 Dam
- Location: Akita Prefecture, Japan
- Coordinates: 40°15′45″N 140°35′19″E
- Opening date: 1951

Dam and spillways
- Height: 16 m (52 ft)
- Length: 93 m (305 ft)

Reservoir
- Total capacity: 188 thousand cubic meters
- Catchment area: 0.7 sq. km
- Surface area: 3 hectares

Karasawa No.1 Dam is an earthfill dam located in Akita Prefecture in Japan. The dam is used for irrigation. The catchment area of the dam is 0.7 km^{2}. The dam impounds about 3 ha of land when full and can store 188 thousand cubic meters of water. The construction of the dam was completed in 1951.
