= Kyowa Dam (Hokkaido) =

Dam in Hokkaido Prefecture, Japan

- Location within Japan
- Location: Hokkaido Prefecture, Japan
- Coordinates: 43°2′09″N 140°36′53″E
- Construction began: 1978
- Opening date: 1995

Dam and spillways
- Height: 56 m (184 ft)
- Length: 334 m (1,096 ft)

Reservoir
- Total capacity: 3200 thousand cubic meters
- Catchment area: 14.3 sq. km
- Surface area: 26 hectares

Kyowa Dam (Japanese: 共和ダム) is a rockfill dam located in Hokkaido Prefecture in Japan. The dam is used for irrigation. The catchment area of the dam is 14.3 km^{2}. The dam impounds about 26 ha of land when full and can store 3200 thousand cubic meters of water. The construction of the dam was started on 1978 and completed in 1995.
