= Magura Dam =

Dam in Akita Prefecture, Japan

- Location within Japan
- Location: Akita Prefecture, Japan
- Coordinates: 39°14′50″N 140°34′28″E
- Construction began: 1928
- Opening date: 1931

Dam and spillways
- Height: 25.5 m (84 ft)
- Length: 170 m (560 ft)

Reservoir
- Total capacity: 360 thousand cubic meters
- Catchment area: 2.1 sq. km
- Surface area: 4 hectares

Magura Dam is an earthfill dam located in Akita Prefecture in Japan. The dam is used for irrigation. The catchment area of the dam is 2.1 km^{2}. The dam impounds about 4 ha of land when full and can store 360 thousand cubic meters of water. The construction of the dam was started on 1928 and completed in 1931.
