= Hayakuchi Dam =

Dam in Akita Prefecture, Japan

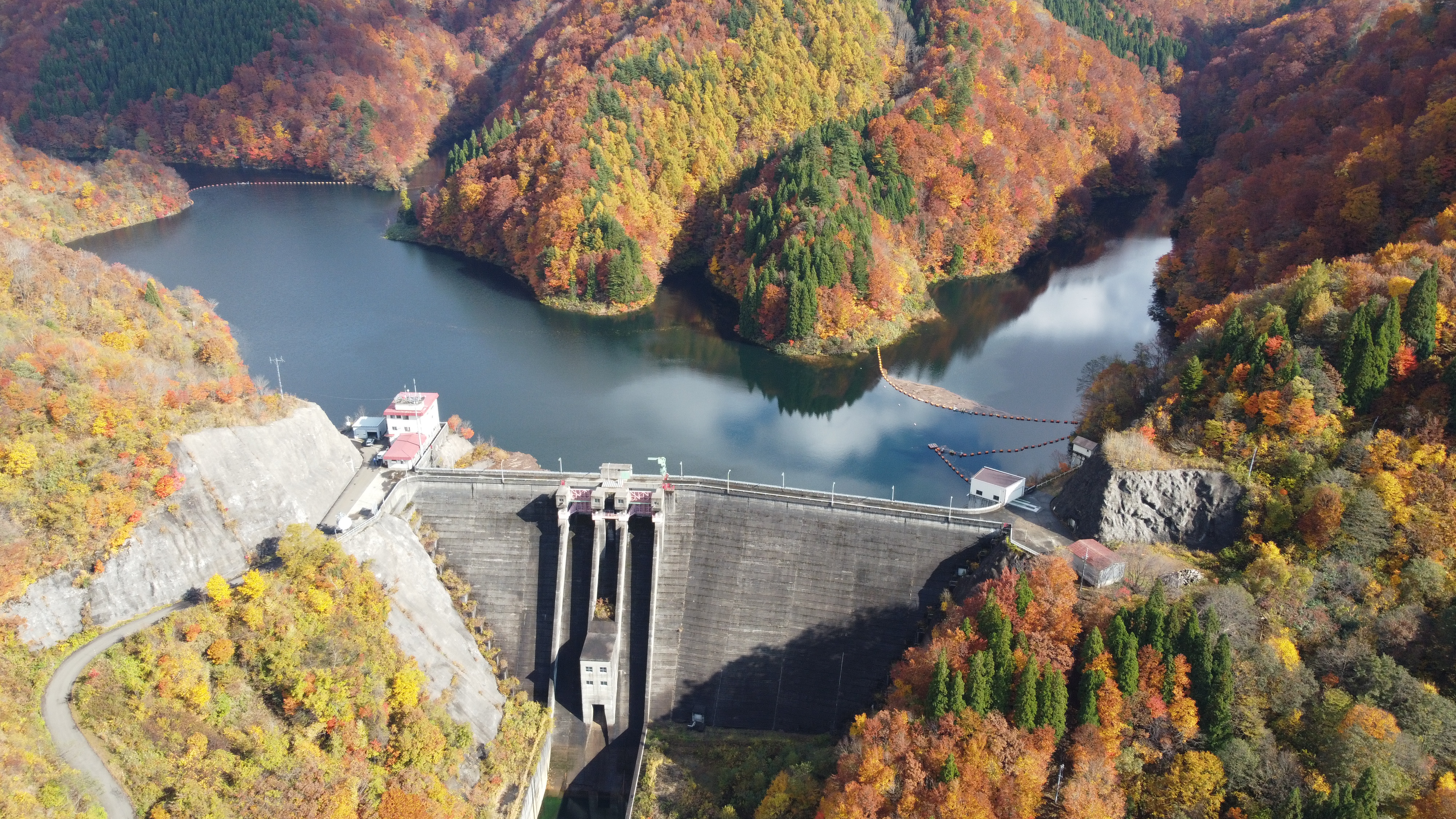

- Location within Japan
- Interactive map of Hayakuchi Dam
- Location: Akita Prefecture, Japan
- Coordinates: 40°24′16″N 140°21′15″E
- Construction began: 1969
- Opening date: 1976

Dam and spillways
- Height: 61 m (200 ft)
- Length: 178 m (584 ft)

Reservoir
- Total capacity: 6550 thousand cubic meters
- Catchment area: 48.5 sq. km
- Surface area: 33 hectares

Hayakuchi Dam is a gravity dam located in Akita Prefecture in Japan. The dam is used for flood control and power production. The catchment area of the dam is 48.5 km^{2}. The dam impounds about 33 ha of land when full and can store 6550 thousand cubic meters of water. The construction of the dam was started on 1969 and completed in 1976.
