= Katajiri No.1 Dam =

Dam in Akita Prefecture, Japan

- Location within Japan
- Interactive map of Katajiri No.1 Dam
- Location: Akita Prefecture, Japan
- Coordinates: 39°24′12″N 140°36′58″E
- Opening date: 1963

Dam and spillways
- Height: 31.8 m (104 ft)
- Length: 128.4 m (421 ft)

Reservoir
- Total capacity: 405 thousand cubic meters
- Catchment area: 4 sq. km
- Surface area: 4 hectares

Katajiri No.1 Dam is an earthfill dam located in Akita Prefecture in Japan. The dam is used for irrigation. The catchment area of the dam is 4 km^{2}. The dam impounds about 4 ha of land when full and can store 405 thousand cubic meters of water. The construction of the dam was completed in 1963.
