= Kagura Dam =

Dam in Akita Prefecture, Japan

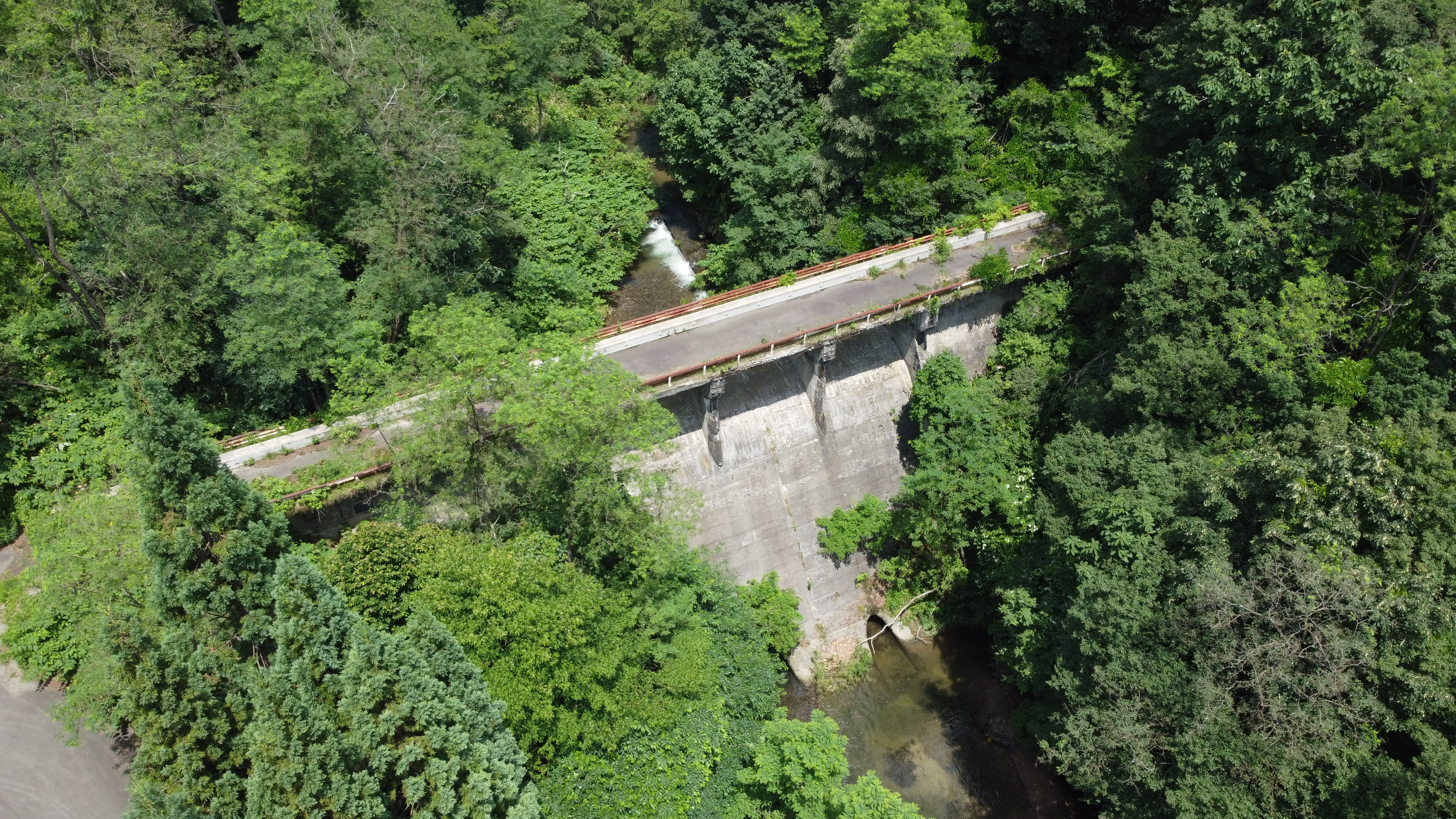

- Location within Japan
- Interactive map of Kagura Dam
- Location: Akita Prefecture, Japan
- Coordinates: 40°19′47″N 140°45′43″E
- Opening date: 1957

Dam and spillways
- Height: 20 m (66 ft)
- Length: 70 m (230 ft)

Reservoir
- Total capacity: 857 thousand cubic meters
- Catchment area: 25.1 sq. km
- Surface area: 14 hectares

Kagura Dam is a gravity dam located in Akita Prefecture in Japan. The dam is used for flood control. The catchment area of the dam is 25.1 km^{2}. The dam impounds about 14 ha of land when full and can store 857 thousand cubic meters of water. The construction of the dam was completed in 1957.
