= Sarutasawa Tameike Dam =

Dam in Akita Prefecture, Japan

Sarutasawa Tameike
- Location within Japan
- Location: Akita Prefecture, Japan
- Coordinates: 39°48′33″N 140°7′07″E
- Opening date: 1938

Dam and spillways
- Height: 20.5 m (67 ft)
- Length: 218 m (715 ft)

Reservoir
- Total capacity: 930,000 m^{3} (33,000,000 cu ft)
- Catchment area: 0.8 km^{2} (0.31 sq mi)
- Surface area: 10 hectares (25 acres)

Sarutasawa Tameike is an earthfill dam located in Akita Prefecture in Japan. The dam is used for irrigation. The catchment area of the dam is 0.8 km^{2}. The dam impounds about 10 ha of land when full and can store 930 thousand cubic meters of water. The construction of the dam was completed in 1938.
