= Takinosawa Tameike Dam =

Dam in Akita Prefecture, Japan

- Location within Japan
- Location: Akita Prefecture, Japan
- Coordinates: 39°44′56″N 140°10′36″E
- Opening date: 1934

Dam and spillways
- Height: 20.3 m (67 ft)
- Length: 75 m (246 ft)

Reservoir
- Total capacity: 188,000 m^{3} (6,600,000 cu ft)
- Catchment area: 0.7 km^{2} (0.27 sq mi)
- Surface area: 5 hectares (12 acres)

Takinosawa Tameike Dam is an earthfill dam located in Akita Prefecture in Japan. The dam is used for irrigation. The catchment area of the dam is 0.7 km^{2}. The dam impounds about 5 ha of land when full and can store 188 thousand cubic meters of water. The construction of the dam was completed in 1934.
