= Naruse Dam =

Dam in Akita Prefecture, Japan

- Location within Japan
- Location: Akita Prefecture, Japan
- Coordinates: 39°2′26″N 140°43′17″E
- Construction began: 1983

Dam and spillways
- Height: 114.5 m (376 ft)
- Length: 755 m (2,477 ft)

Reservoir
- Total capacity: 78500 thousand cubic meters
- Catchment area: 68.1 sq. km
- Surface area: 226 hectares

Naruse Dam is a trapezoidal dam located in Akita Prefecture in Japan. The dam is used for flood control, irrigation, water supply and power production. The catchment area of the dam is 68.1 km^{2}. The dam impounds about 226 ha of land when full and can store 78500 thousand cubic meters of water. The construction of the dam was started on 1983. As of 2022, it is still under construction with completion planned for 20 March 2023.
