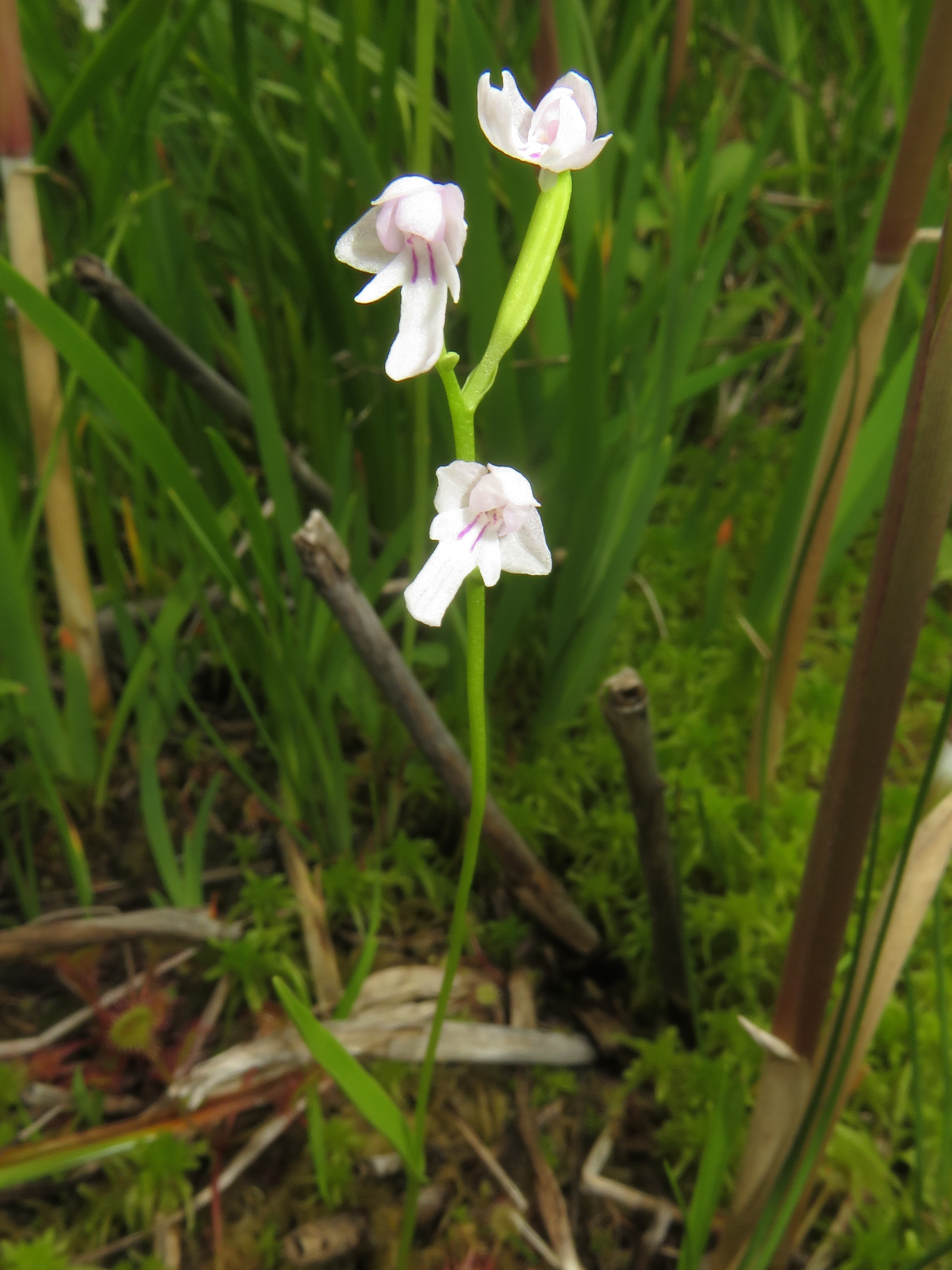
- In Oze National Park, Japan

Scientific classification
- Kingdom: Plantae
- Clade: Tracheophytes
- Clade: Angiosperms
- Clade: Monocots
- Order: Asparagales
- Family: Orchidaceae
- Subfamily: Orchidoideae
- Genus: Hemipilia
- Species: H. kinoshitae

Binomial name
- Hemipilia kinoshitae (Makino) Y.Tang, H.Peng & T.Yukawa

Synonyms
- Amitostigma kinoshitae (Makino) Schltr.; Gymnadenia keiskei var. kinoshitae Makino; Gymnadenia kinoshitae (Makino) Makino; Orchis kinoshitae (Makino) Soó; Ponerorchis kinoshitae (Makino) X.H.Jin, Schuit. & W.T.Jin; Amitostigma hisamatsui Miyabe & Tatew.; Gymnadenia gracilis var. angustifolia Finet

= Hemipilia kinoshitae =

Species of flowering plant

Hemipilia kinoshitae is a species of flowering plant in the family Orchidaceae, native to the south Kuril Islands and northern Japan (Hokkaido, north Honshu).

== Taxonomy ==
The species was first described in 1903 by Tomitaro Makino as Gymnadenia keiskei var. kinoshitae. In 1909, he raised it to a full species as Gymnadenia kinoshitae. It was later transferred to other genera, including Orchis and Amitostigma. A molecular phylogenetic study in 2014 found that species of Amitostigma, Neottianthe and Ponerorchis were mixed together in a single clade, making none of the three genera monophyletic as then circumscribed. Amitostigma and Neottianthe were subsumed into Ponerorchis, with this species then becoming Ponerorchis kinoshitae. The genus Ponerorchis has since been synonymized with the genus Hemipilia, resulting in the present name.
