= Natsuse Dam =

Dam in Akita Prefecture, Japan

- Location within Japan
- Location: Akita Prefecture, Japan
- Coordinates: 39°38′04″N 140°42′38″E
- Construction began: 1938
- Opening date: 1940

Dam and spillways
- Height: 40 m (130 ft)
- Length: 115.8 m (380 ft)

Reservoir
- Total capacity: 5959 thousand cubic meters
- Catchment area: 637.4 sq. km
- Surface area: 86 hectares

Natsuse Dam is a gravity dam located in Akita Prefecture in Japan. The dam is used for power production. The catchment area of the dam is 637.4 km^{2}. The dam impounds about 86 ha of land when full and can store 5959 thousand cubic meters of water. The construction of the dam was started on 1938 and completed in 1940.
