= Ainono Dam =

Dam in Akita Prefecture, Japan

- Location within Japan
- Location: Akita Prefecture, Japan
- Coordinates: 39°16′48″N 140°38′42″E
- Opening date: 1961

Dam and spillways
- Height: 40.8 m (134 ft)
- Length: 133.9 m (439 ft)

Reservoir
- Total capacity: 3568 thousand cubic meters
- Catchment area: 37.8 sq. km
- Surface area: 30 hectares

Ainono Dam is an earthfill dam located in Akita Prefecture in Japan. The dam is used for irrigation. The catchment area of the dam is 37.8 km^{2}. The dam impounds about 30 ha of land when full and can store 3568 thousand cubic meters of water. The construction of the dam was and completed in 1961.
