= Naganuma Dam (Akita) =

Dam in Akita Prefecture, Japan

- Location within Japan
- Location: Akita Prefecture, Japan
- Coordinates: 39°21′59″N 140°36′55″E
- Opening date: 1954

Dam and spillways
- Height: 16.5 m (54 ft)
- Length: 81 m (266 ft)

Reservoir
- Total capacity: 183 thousand cubic meters
- Catchment area: 0.2 sq. km
- Surface area: 1 hectares

Naganuma Dam is an earthfill dam located in Akita Prefecture in Japan. The dam is used for irrigation. The catchment area of the dam is 0.2 km^{2}. The dam impounds about 1 ha of land when full and can store 183 thousand cubic meters of water. The construction of the dam was completed in 1954.
