= Kurakarizawa Dam =

Dam in Akita Prefecture, Japan

- Location within Japan
- Location: Akita Prefecture, Japan
- Coordinates: 39°12′45″N 140°34′37″E
- Opening date: 1945

Dam and spillways
- Height: 18.6 m (61 ft)
- Length: 80 m (260 ft)

Reservoir
- Total capacity: 122 thousand cubic meters
- Catchment area: 1.9 sq. km
- Surface area: 2 hectares

Kurakarizawa Dam is an earthfill dam located in Akita Prefecture in Japan. The dam is used for irrigation. The catchment area of the dam is 1.9 km^{2}. The dam impounds about 2 ha of land when full and can store 122 thousand cubic meters of water. The construction of the dam was completed in 1945.
