= Yashio Dam (Akita) =

Dam in Akita Prefecture, Japan

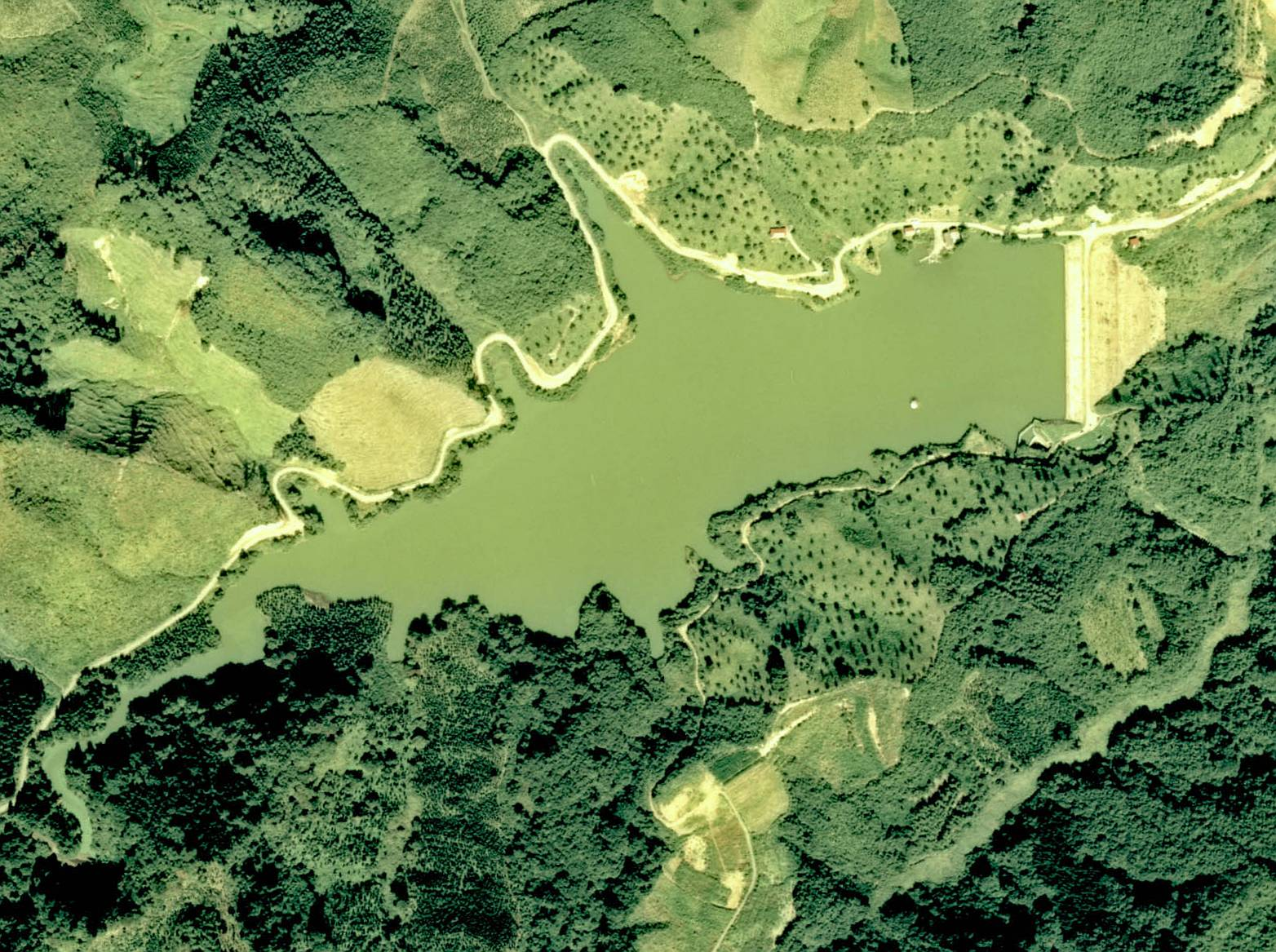

- Location within Japan
- Location: Akita Prefecture, Japan
- Coordinates: 39°15′36″N 140°14′10″E
- Opening date: 1963

Dam and spillways
- Height: 27 m (89 ft)
- Length: 175.4 m (575 ft)

Reservoir
- Total capacity: 958,000 m^{3} (33,800,000 cu ft)
- Catchment area: 1.9 km^{2} (0.73 sq mi)
- Surface area: 9 hectares (22 acres)

Yashio Dam is an earthfill dam located in Akita Prefecture in Japan. The dam is used for irrigation. The catchment area of the dam is 1.9 km^{2}. The dam impounds about 9 ha of land when full and can store 958 thousand cubic meters of water. The construction of the dam was completed in 1963.
