= Yoshida Tameike Dam =

Dam in Akita Prefecture, Japan

Yoshida Tameike
- Location within Japan
- Location: Akita Prefecture, Japan
- Coordinates: 39°49′00″N 140°6′16″E
- Opening date: 1954

Dam and spillways
- Height: 18 m (59 ft)
- Length: 230 m (750 ft)

Reservoir
- Total capacity: 957,000 m^{3} (33,800,000 cu ft)
- Catchment area: 3.7 km^{2} (1.4 sq mi)
- Surface area: 12 hectares (30 acres)

Yoshida Tameike is an earthfill dam located in Akita Prefecture in Japan. The dam is used for irrigation. The catchment area of the dam is 3.7 km^{2}. The dam impounds about 12 ha of land when full and can store 957 thousand cubic meters of water. The construction of the dam was completed in 1954.
