= Suganosawa Dam =

Dam in Akita Prefecture, Japan

- Location within Japan
- Location: Akita Prefecture, Japan
- Coordinates: 40°8′08″N 140°7′10″E
- Opening date: 1912

Dam and spillways
- Height: 16 m (52 ft)
- Length: 111 m (364 ft)

Reservoir
- Total capacity: 320,000 m^{3} (11,000,000 cu ft)
- Catchment area: 1.3 km^{2} (0.50 sq mi)
- Surface area: 12 hectares (30 acres)

Suganosawa Dam is an earthfill dam located in Akita Prefecture in Japan. The dam is used for irrigation. The catchment area of the dam is 1.3 km^{2}. The dam impounds about 12 ha of land when full and can store 320 thousand cubic meters of water. The construction of the dam was completed in 1912.
