= Sunakozawa Dam =

Dam in Akita Prefecture, Japan

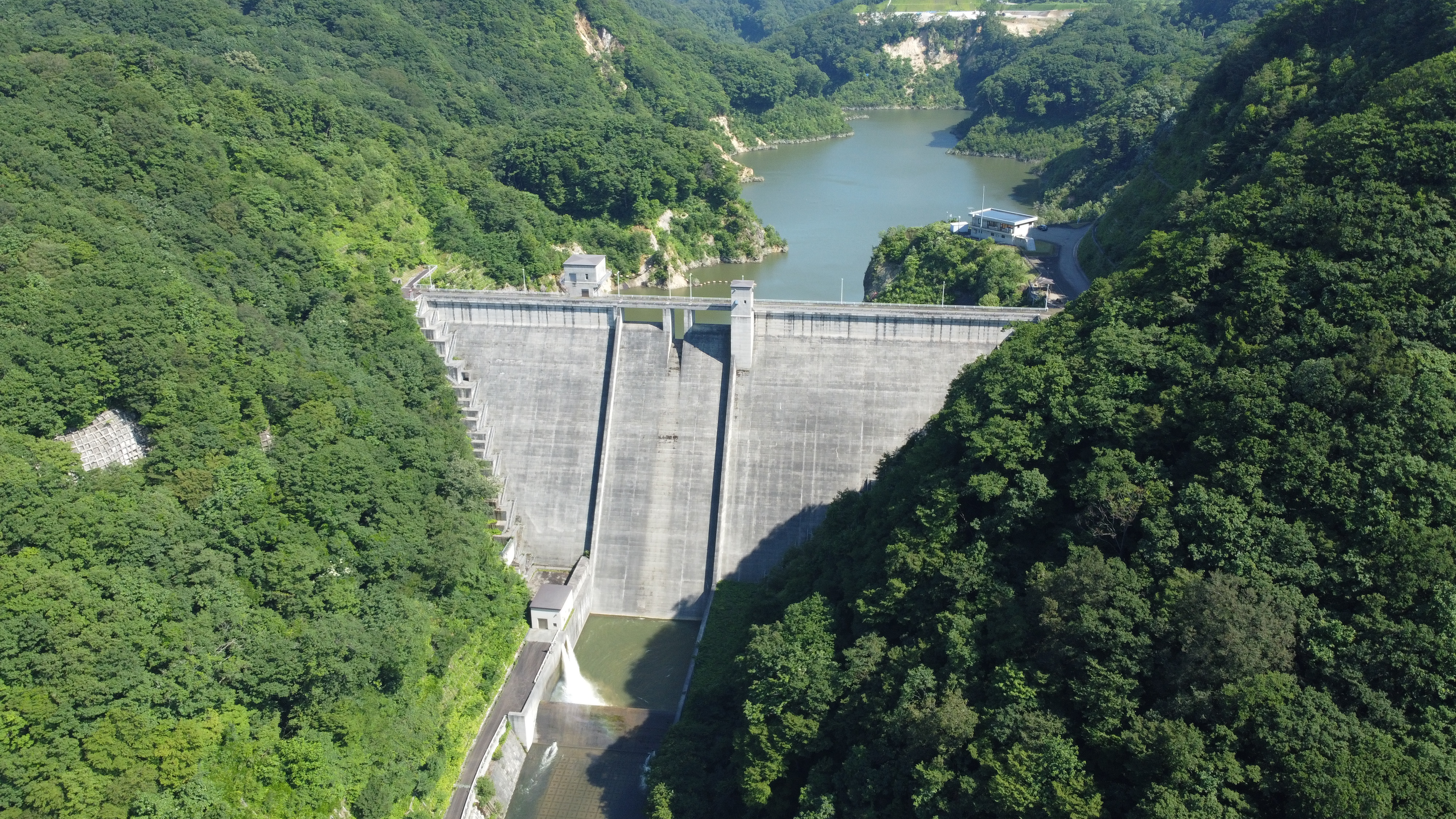

- Location within Japan
- Location: Akita Prefecture, Japan
- Coordinates: 40°22′34″N 140°46′07″E
- Construction began: 1985
- Opening date: 2010

Dam and spillways
- Height: 78.5 m (258 ft)
- Length: 185 m (607 ft)

Reservoir
- Total capacity: 8,650,000 m^{3} (305,000,000 cu ft)
- Catchment area: 17 km^{2} (6 5/8 sq mi)
- Surface area: 44 ha (110 acres)

Sunakozawa Dam is a gravity dam located in Akita Prefecture in Japan. The dam is used for flood control and water supply. The catchment area of the dam is 17 km^{2} (6 5/8 sq mi). The dam impounds about 44 ha (110 acres) of land when full and can store 8,650 thousand cubic meters (305 million cubic feet) of water. The construction of the dam was started on 1985 and completed in 2010.
