= Nangai Dam =

Dam in Akita Prefecture, Japan

- Location within Japan
- Location: Akita Prefecture, Japan
- Coordinates: 39°26′13″N 140°17′51″E
- Opening date: 1978

Dam and spillways
- Height: 21.4 m (70 ft)
- Length: 113.5 m (372 ft)

Reservoir
- Total capacity: 1724 thousand cubic meters
- Catchment area: 10 sq. km
- Surface area: 44 hectares

Nangai Dam is an earthfill dam located in Akita Prefecture in Japan. The dam is used for flood control and irrigation. The catchment area of the dam is 10 km^{2}. The dam impounds about 44 ha of land when full and can store 1724 thousand cubic meters of water. The construction of the dam was completed in 1978.
