= Chokai Dam =

Dam in Akita Prefecture, Japan

- Location within Japan
- Interactive map of Chokai Dam
- Location: Akita Prefecture, Japan
- Coordinates: 39°7′30″N 140°9′20″E
- Construction began: 1993

Dam and spillways
- Height: 81 m (266 ft)
- Length: 365 m (1,198 ft)

Reservoir
- Total capacity: 46800 thousand cubic meters
- Catchment area: 83.9 sq. km
- Surface area: 310 hectares

Chokai Dam is a trapezoidal dam located in Akita Prefecture in Japan. The dam is used for flood control, water supply and power production. The catchment area of the dam is 83.9 km^{2}. The dam impounds about 310 ha of land when full and can store 46800 thousand cubic meters of water. The construction of the dam was started on 1993 .
