= Myoei Tameike Dam =

Dam in Akita Prefecture, Japan

Myoei Tameike
- Location within Japan
- Location: Akita Prefecture, Japan
- Coordinates: 39°19′42″N 140°34′16″E
- Opening date: 1935

Dam and spillways
- Height: 18.3 m (60 ft)
- Length: 710 m (2,330 ft)

Reservoir
- Total capacity: 1431 thousand cubic meters
- Catchment area: 2.1 sq. km
- Surface area: 20 hectares

Myoei Tameike is an earthfill dam located in Akita Prefecture in Japan. The dam is used for irrigation. The catchment area of the dam is 2.1 km^{2}. The dam impounds about 20 ha of land when full and can store 1431 thousand cubic meters of water. The construction of the dam was completed in 1935.
