= Itado Dam =

Dam in Akita Prefecture, Japan

- Location within Japan
- Interactive map of Itado Dam
- Location: Akita Prefecture, Japan
- Coordinates: 39°4′04″N 140°35′50″E
- Construction began: 1980
- Opening date: 1983

Dam and spillways
- Height: 28.7 m (94 ft)
- Length: 120 m (390 ft)

Reservoir
- Total capacity: 1598 thousand cubic meters
- Catchment area: 182.3 sq. km
- Surface area: 21 hectares

Itado Dam is a gravity dam located in Akita Prefecture in Japan. The dam is used for power production. The catchment area of the dam is 182.3 km^{2}. The dam impounds about 21 ha of land when full and can store 1598 thousand cubic meters of water. The construction of the dam was started on 1980 and completed in 1983.
