= Kuromorigawa No.1 Dam =

Dam in Akita Prefecture, Japan

- Location within Japan
- Location: Akita Prefecture, Japan
- Coordinates: 39°17′48″N 140°2′31″E
- Construction began: 1974
- Opening date: 1976

Dam and spillways
- Height: 26 m (85 ft)
- Length: 330 m (1,080 ft)

Reservoir
- Total capacity: 1305 thousand cubic meters
- Catchment area: 5.7 sq. km
- Surface area: 18 hectares

Kuromorigawa No.1 Dam is an earthfill dam located in Akita Prefecture in Japan. The dam is used for water supply. The catchment area of the dam is 5.7 km^{2}. The dam impounds about 18 ha of land when full and can store 1305 thousand cubic meters of water. The construction of the dam was started on 1974 and completed in 1976.
