= Kyowa Dam (Akita) =

Dam in Akita Prefecture, Japan

- Location within Japan
- Location: Akita Prefecture, Japan
- Coordinates: 39°41′32″N 140°26′21″E
- Construction began: 1979
- Opening date: 1997

Dam and spillways
- Height: 49.3 m (162 ft)
- Length: 222.5 m (730 ft)

Reservoir
- Total capacity: 7800 thousand cubic meters
- Catchment area: 24.4 sq. km
- Surface area: 49 hectares

Kyowa Dam (Japanese: 協和ダム, きょうわだむ) is a gravity dam located in Akita Prefecture in Japan. The dam is used for flood control and water supply. The catchment area of the dam is 24.4 km^{2}. The dam impounds about 49 ha of land when full and can store 7800 thousand cubic meters of water. The construction of the dam was started on 1979 and completed in 1997.
