= Takikawa Dam =

Dam in Akita Prefecture, Japan

- Location within Japan
- Location: Akita Prefecture, Japan
- Coordinates: 39°54′45″N 139°47′43″E
- Construction began: 1984
- Opening date: 1998

Dam and spillways
- Height: 28.7 m (94 ft)
- Length: 175 m (574 ft)

Reservoir
- Total capacity: 690,000 m^{3} (24,000,000 cu ft)
- Catchment area: 3.8 km^{2} (1.5 sq mi)
- Surface area: 9 hectares (22 acres)

Takikawa Dam is a rockfill dam located in Akita Prefecture in Japan. The dam is used for irrigation. The catchment area of the dam is 3.8 km^{2}. The dam impounds about 9 ha of land when full and can store 690 thousand cubic meters of water. The construction of the dam was started on 1984 and completed in 1998.
