= Haginari Dam =

Dam in Akita Prefecture, Japan

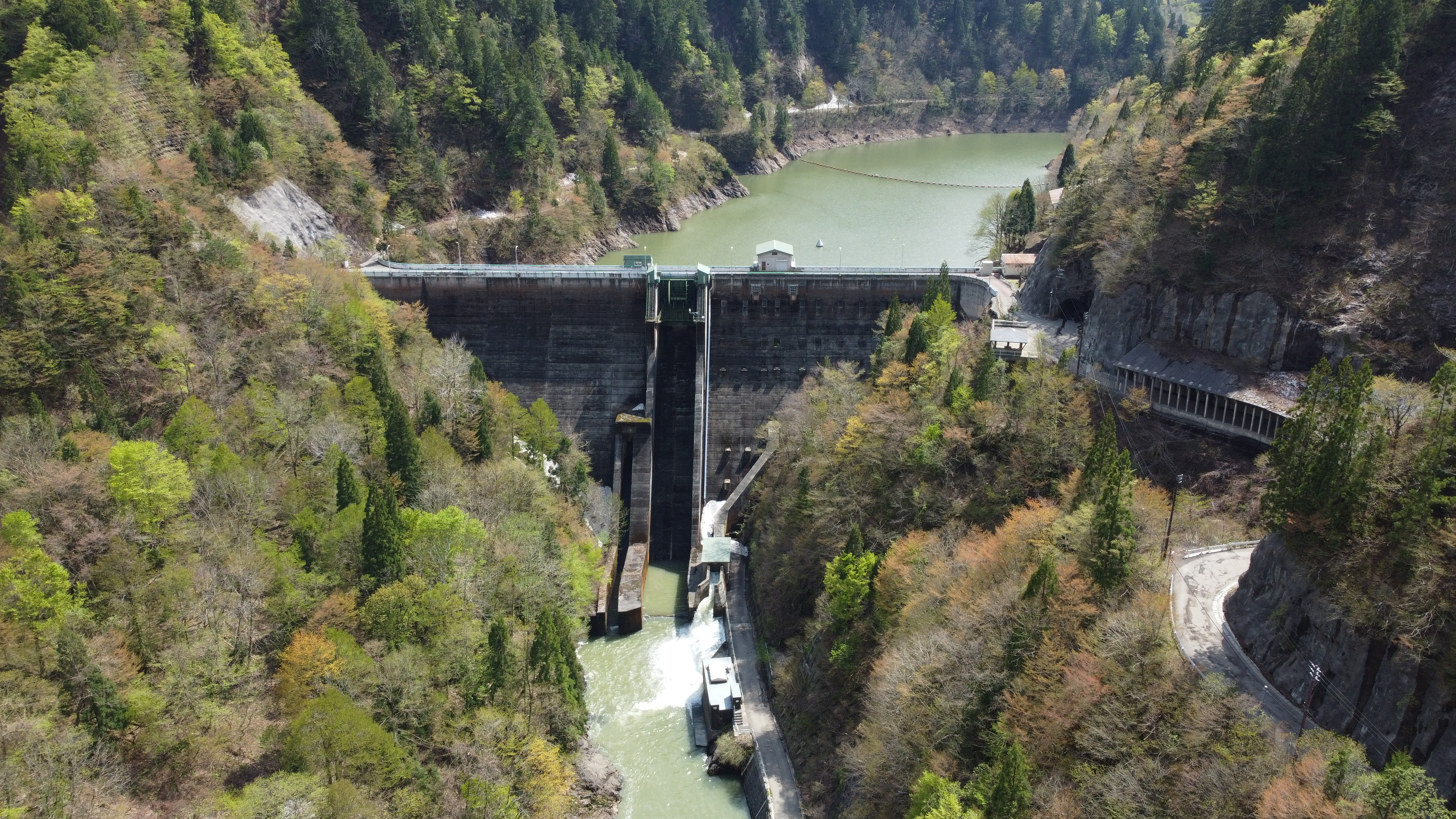

- Location within Japan
- Interactive map of Haginari Dam
- Location: Akita Prefecture, Japan
- Coordinates: 39°55′28″N 140°18′48″E
- Construction began: 1961
- Opening date: 1966

Dam and spillways
- Height: 61 m (200 ft)
- Length: 173 m (568 ft)

Reservoir
- Total capacity: 14950 thousand cubic meters
- Catchment area: 86.7 sq. km
- Surface area: 85 hectares

Haginari Dam is a gravity dam located in Akita Prefecture in Japan. The dam is used for flood control and power production. The catchment area of the dam is 86.7 km^{2}. The dam impounds about 85 ha of land when full and can store 14950 thousand cubic meters of water. The construction of the dam was started on 1961 and completed in 1966.
