= Matsukura Dam =

Dam in Akita Prefecture, Japan

- Location within Japan
- Location: Akita Prefecture, Japan
- Coordinates: 39°10′05″N 140°19′52″E
- Opening date: 1961

Dam and spillways
- Height: 21.9 m (72 ft)
- Length: 98 m (322 ft)

Reservoir
- Total capacity: 549 thousand cubic meters
- Catchment area: 1.7 sq. km
- Surface area: 7 hectares

Matsukura Dam is an earthfill dam located in Akita Prefecture in Japan. The dam is used for irrigation. The catchment area of the dam is 1.7 km^{2}. The dam impounds about 7 ha of land when full and can store 549 thousand cubic meters of water. The construction of the dam was completed in 1961.
