= List of dams in Miyagi Prefecture =

The following is a list of dams in Miyagi Prefecture, Japan.

== List ==
Name	Location	Opened	Height (meters)	Image
Aikawa Dam			40.3	
Aoshita No.1 Dam		1933	17.4	
Aoshita No.2 Dam		1933	17.4	
Aoshita No.3 Dam		1933	17.7	
Aratozawa Dam		1998	74.4	
Ayashi Tameike Dam		1949	16.7	
Futatsuishi Dam		2009	70.5	
Gandozawa Dam		2009	68	
Hanakawa Dam		1964	26.4	
Hanayama Dam		1957	47.8	
Haraikawa Dam		2012	38.9	
Honogawa Dam			41.4	
Kadaijin Dam		1937	27	
Kamafusa Dam		1970	45.5	
Kamiosawa Dam		2003	19	
Kawarako Dam		1969	20	
Kawauchisawa Dam			39.7	
Kejyonuma Dam		1995	24	
Koda Dam		2005	43.5	
Kurikoma Dam		1962	57	
Magosawa Tameike Dam		1937	16.5	
Matsugabo Dam			46	
Minamikawa Dam		1987	46	
Miyatoko Dam		1998	48	
Murata Dam		1979	36.7	
Naganuma Dam		2014	15.3	
Nanakita Dam		1984	74	
Naruko Dam		1958	94.5	
Okura Dam			82	
Shichikashuku Dam		1991	90	
Shukunosawa Dam		2003	26	
Sonoseki Dam		1999	23.5	
Sugo Dam		1997	27.6	
Tarumizu Dam		1976	43	
Tutusago Dam			105	
Urushizawa Dam		1981	80	
Ushino Dam		1972	21.4	
Yamanashi Dam			16	

== See also ==
- Media related to Dams in Miyagi prefecture at Wikimedia Commons
