= Hanayama Dam =

Dam in Miyagi Prefecture, Japan

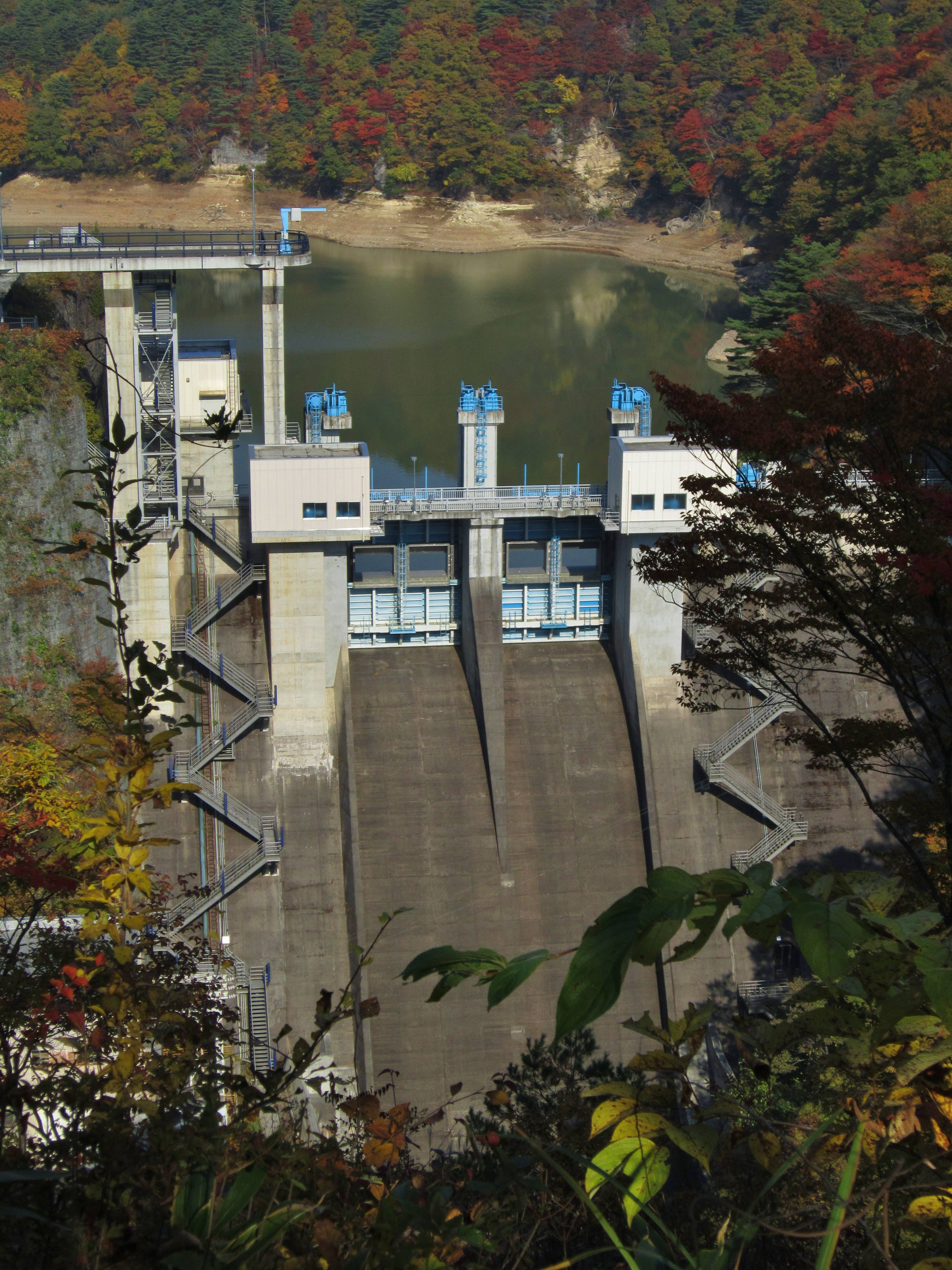

- Location within Miyagi Prefecture Location within Japan
- Location: Kurihara, Miyagi, Japan
- Coordinates: 38°46′48″N 140°52′08″E
- Construction began: 1952
- Opening date: 1957

Dam and spillways
- Type of dam: Gravity dam
- Impounds: Hasama River
- Height: 47.8 m (157 ft)
- Length: 72 m (236 ft)
- Dam volume: 45,000 m^{3}

Reservoir
- Creates: Hanayama Reservoir
- Total capacity: 36,600,000 m^{3}
- Catchment area: 126.9 km^{2}
- Surface area: 240 ha

Power Station
- Annual generation: 3,050 kW

Hanayama Dam (花山ダム, Hanayama damu) is a dam on the Hasama River, belonging to the Kitakami Class A river system, in Kurihara, Miyagi Prefecture, Japan, completed in 1957.

Designated as an auxiliary multi-purpose dam, the concrete structure is 48.5 meters tall and uses a gravity dam design. Managed by the Kurihara Dam Regional Office (which is owned by the Miyagi Public Works Department), the primary purpose of the dam is to provide flood control for the Hasama River, an important tributary for the larger Kitakami river system as well as provide water to the cities of Kurihara and Tome. It is the first dam constructed by the Miyagi Prefecture. The reservoir formed by the dam was named Lake Hanayama.

== Geography ==
The Hasama River is the second largest river in Miyagi Prefecture after the Eai River, and is part of the Kitakami river system. The river source is from Mount Kurikoma and flows southeastward, while also flowing into the Nihasama and Sanhasama River. The primary stream before the confluence point of the Nihasama and Sanhasama rivers was originally named Ichihasama River, and during the dam's construction was still named as such. After this point, the river eventually joins with the Old Kitakami River, while forming a group of small lakes and marshes such as Izunuma and Naganuma as tributaries.

The dam was constructed at a narrow point where the Hasama River transitions from a mountainous to a plains region. At the time of construction, the dam was located in the then-called Hanayama Village, Kurihara District, which is where the dam gets its name. However, due to the influence from "The Great Heisei Mergers", Hanayama Village merged with other towns and villages in the area and is now Kurihara.

== History ==
As a part of the Kitakami river system, Hasama and Eai River are used to supply water to the Sendai Plain as tributaries. However, the area has historically encountered frequent damage from flooding, and projects to modify the rivers have been undertaken ever since the period of the Sendai Domain. From these projects; however, side effects have emerged. Because river modification efforts undertaken by the Sendai Domain placed a heavy emphasis on water transportation, work done to the Old Kitakami River caused its floodwaters to be more prone to flow back into the Hasama River.

In 1932, through the work done during the Hasama River Water Improvement Project, a cut-off channel was created in order to correct the meandering nature of the river, resulting in a decrease of its width. This decreased width obstructed the flow of river water, and in 1947's Typhoon Kathleen and 1948's Typhoon Ione, water overflowed from the constricted sections of the river, causing major flood damage to the surrounding agricultural land and its inhabitants.

Meanwhile, in the northern part of the Sendai Plain, the districts of Kurihara and Tome, which provided 620,000 koku to the Sendai domain, largely depended on the Hasama River, leading to frequent water conflicts during droughts. Additionally, as the arable land continued to expand, the traditional method of drawing water directly from the river began to reach its limits.

During this period, the entirety of the Kitakami river system was initially the subject of the Comprehensive River Development Project led by the Ministry of Construction (presently the Ministry of Land, Infrastructure, Transport and Tourism), the Ministry of Agriculture and Forestry (presently the Ministry of Agriculture, Forestry and Fisheries), and the Miyagi and Iwate prefectures. In 1954, the Kitakami River basin received a designation under the name "Kitakami Specific Area Comprehensive Development Plan", with the goal of promoting industrial development in the area, centering on Sendai, through controlled flood control and water utilization. "The 5 Big Dams of the Kitakami River" and the "Eai River Comprehensive Development Project" (see: Naruko Dam, Eai River) were included in these plans. The "First Comprehensive Development Project of the Hasama River", planned by the Miyagi Prefectural Government, was also included in the plans for Hasama River.

Hosokura Mine, established during the Heian Period and located in the Hasama River basin, was a mainstay to the local mining industry until its closure in 1987. In 1934, Mitsubishi Metal Mining (presently Mitsubishi Materials) acquired Hosokura Mine and began mining copper and zinc. However, as time went on, the demand for water and electricity caused by the onsite ore smelting and the increasing number of workers became an issue. In November 1941, the Mitsubishi Kawaguchi No. 1 Power Station (presently Hosokura Metal Mining Co. Kawaguchi No. 1 Power Station) began operation as a conduit type power station in the town of Ichihasama (now Kurihara), supplying the mine with a maximum of 1,550 kW of electricity. However, this amount of electricity still did not suffice, and additional power was required.

With this historical background in mind, Hanayama Dam entered its planning stages in 1950 as the central project of the "First Comprehensive Development Project of the Hasama River" by the Miyagi Prefectural Government.

== Compensation ==
Preliminary investigations into where the dam was to be built began in 1950. The current location of the dam was selected for two primary reasons: firstly, the foundation ground was composed of an area consisting of andesite with steep banks on both sides. Secondly, a large man-made lake could be formed to ensure a satisfactory total water storage capacity. In 1952, the dam was designated as a government-subsidized project, and from 1953 an implementation plan study was conducted to determine the dam's specifications.

At the time, 181 households and other facilities were located at the center of the former village of Hanayama, including the town hall, a school, and a clinic. With the construction of Hanayama Dam, these buildings and houses were to be submerged, thus compensation negotiations began with the residents. However, while negotiations were still underway, the prefectural government began construction of temporary facilities to lay a road for the construction of various facilities for the dam, sparking outrage from the local residents. The residents formed the "Hanayama Village Dam Task Force Committee", with a policy of absolute opposition to the dam construction. Following this, compensation negotiations were suspended. While the prefecture halted construction of its temporary facilities and attempted to resume compensation negotiations with the residents, due to the perceived breach of trust the residents felt towards the government, it took over a year before the prefecture was able to convince the residents to begin negotiations once again.

It was not until April 1954 that the residents were satisfied, and compensation negotiations resumed. The prefectural government proceeded to establish the Hanayama Dam Compensation Office under the direct control of the governor, and negotiated with the Hanayama Village Dam Task Force Committee while receiving advice from the advisory Ichihasama River Comprehensive Development Project Task Force Committee. A representative committee of 3 members from the prefectural government and 10 members from the Hanayama Village Dam Task Force Committee was established to hold discussions, and the discussions' results were then sent to the Ichihasama River Comprehensive Project Development Office (on the prefectural government side), the Task Force Committee, the local community advisory board, and the village assembly (on the local residents' side). Both sides engaged in serious discussions, with the residents wagering the survival of the village and the prefectural government vying for the success of the project, which was essential to the success of the Kitakami Specific Area Comprehensive Development Plan.

During the negotiations, a proposal was made to secure replacement land and relocate the village. This proposal was approved, and compensation negotiations concluded on June 30, 1955. Following the negotiations, the Zashu area, located upstream from the former village center, was selected as the replacement land, and construction efforts for the new residences and facilities soon began.

The main body of the dam was completed in 1957, with operations starting in November of the same year.

== Purpose of the Dam ==
At a height of 47.8m at the time of completion, the purpose of the dam was fourfold: flood control, unspecified water utilization, irrigation, and hydroelectric power generation. Flood control covers the Hasama River banks from the dam to the confluence of the old Kitakami River, and reduced the estimated high-water discharge of 1,440 tons per second (based on the flooding during Typhoon Kathleen and Typhoon Ione) to 455 tons per second, a cut of 985 tons per second. For irrigation, the maximum rate of supply was 19.6 tons per second to 8,844.5 ha of the northern Sendai Plain.

Purposes related to Hosokura Mine included unspecified water utilization and hydroelectric power generation. In the case of unspecified water use, the amount of water withdrawn to secure water for agricultural use, which is usually the amount of water used under the provisions of customary water rights, is discharged. But at Hanayama Dam, a fixed amount of clean water and industrial use water was provided to Hosokura Mine. 2,592 tons of clean water and 5,184 tons of industrial use water were provided per day. For hydroelectric power, aside from being a water source for the Mitsubishi Kawaguchi No. 1 Power Station (presently Hosokura Metal Mining Co. Kawaguchi No. 1 Power Station), another power station, Mitsubishi Kawaguchi No. 2 Power Station (presently Hosokura Metal Mining Co. Kawaguchi No. 2 Power Station, maximum permissible output: 1,500 kW) was constructed to support Hosokura Mine's operations. In addition to Hanayama Dam, Mitsubishi Metal Mining (presently Mitsubishi Materials) was involved in the development of other dams and related power generation, participating as an electric utility for Moriyoshi Dam (located on the Komata River) in Akita Prefecture.

After the completion of Hanayama Dam, the prefectural government continued to carry out large-scale public works projects in line with its comprehensive development project, with one example being Kurikoma Dam (gravity-type, 62.0 m), completed on the Sanhasama River in 1961. In addition, the company participated in a national agricultural water utilization project led by the Tohoku Agricultural Administration Bureau of the Ministry of Agriculture, Forestry and Fisheries as an administrator for river management. Following the completion of Aratozawa Dam (rock-fill, 74.4 m) on the Nihasama River in 1991 and Oda Dam (rock-fill, 43.5 m) on the Nagasaki River in 2007, management was transferred to the prefectural government Kurihara Regional Dam Management Office. The "Second Hasama Comprehensive Development Project" has been underway since 1971, and the Naganuma Dam (earth dam, 15.3 m) finished construction in 2014 as an auxiliary multi-purpose dam on Naganuma, a natural lake. Many migratory birds rest at these dams during the winter, and the prefecture has embarked on a project to improve the area around the dam lakes in order to disperse the migratory birds in the interest of preventing the spread of avian influenza caused by overcrowding.

== Redevelopment ==
Hanayama Dam has undergone two redevelopment projects since its completion. The first project was the "Hanayama Dam Phase II Construction Project," which ran for six years from 1961 to 1967, and the second was the "Hanayama Dam Redevelopment Project", which took place over 14 years from 1991 to 2005.

=== Phase 2 Construction Project ===
During the construction of the dam, the Zashu area upstream was selected as the location site for the central part of Hanayama Village, which was to be submerged under water by the dam's discharge. The village center, including the town office and clinic, was subsequently relocated. However, when the dam lake is full of water, the Zashu area is still located at a lower elevation. To counteract this, enclosing embankments were built in the area to withstand overflow during periods when the lake was at capacity. Despite these efforts, in May 1958, the year following the dam's completion, a large amount of water caused by snowmelt caused the water level of the dam to rise above the height of the surrounding embankments, flooding approximately 124 hectares of the Zashu area. To prevent further damage from overflow, the operators were forced to engage in an emergency discharge of the dam's floodwaters. As a result, the dam was unable to store said floodwaters and perform proper flood control.

Miyagi Prefecture, which faced the dual shock of the dam's flood control system failure (the dam's primary objective), and damage to the alternative land it had developed to compensate those who had to relocate, began improving the dam's sluices in 1959 in an effort improve drainage while conducting a geological survey. Starting from 1961, plans were made to raise the elevation of the Zashu area through raising its embankments, aiming to the keep the elevation higher than the water level of the lake during full capacity in order to defend against further flooding damages. This was the "Hanayama Dam Phase 2 Construction Project", and since large scale modifications to the area's embankments were to be implemented, an urban redevelopment plan was also drawn up to reorganize the land. Completed in 1967, the total construction cost was approximately 385 million yen. Since then, there has been no additional flooding within the Zashu area as a result of overflow.

=== Raising the Dam's Embankments ===
Forty years after its completion, the dam began to encounter issues with deterioration. A notably problematic issue was with the water discharge gates. Because the gates were an older design, finer adjustments to the amount of water discharged was not possible, preventing efficient water management. In addition, water demand in the surrounding area at the time was rapidly changing. With the opening of the Tohoku Expressway and Shinkansen as well as the following increase in population in the Kurihara area as a commuter town for Sendai City, the water supply was placed under additional strain. In 1987, the Hosokura Mine ceased mining operations, with only specialized on-site ore smelting specializing in copper and zinc recycling remaining. This resulted in a decrease in demand for clean and industrial use water at the mine, as well as less power.

Due to a combination of various factors, including deterioration and changing water demands, the prefectural government launched the "Hanayama Dam Redevelopment Project" in 1991, which focused on improving the facilities of the dam. This project included raising the dam's height and its embankments by 0.7 meters and rebuilding the water intake tower and gates. In particular, the gates were improved to two-tiered gates with a lower "parent gate" and an upper "child gate", with the child gate opening to allow overflow from the parent gate for water discharge during non-flood periods. This is the so-called "natural regulation method" that was mainstream in dam design at the time.

Completed in 2005, the project added gave the dam and lake the ability to act as a water supply, supplying 19,000 tons per day of clean water to the cities of Kurihara and Tome. Another improvement was improved flood control, reducing the planned high water flow rate from 1,350 tons per second to 230 tons per second (a cut of 1,120 tons per second). The dam is capable of storing an additional 175 tons per second of water. As for hydroelectric power, Hosokura Metal Mining Co. Kawaguchi No. 1 and No. 2 Power Stations are still in operation.

== Lake Hanayama ==
Lake Hanayama, created as a result of the dam's construction, is now a recreational spot in Kurihara City visited by many of its inhabitants. The lake is home to many species of fish, with some fish such as eels being able to be caught and taken home. It is also possible to go smelt fishing during the winter season. The fishing rights of the lake are owned by the Miyagi Hanayama Fisherman's Cooperative, with fishing day passes ranging from 1000 to 1500 yen and a year pass selling for 4000 yen. However, in order to conserve resources for the local fisheries, juvenile fish with a length under 15 cm cannot be brought home. On the lake, a speed limit of 2 knots (3.7 km/h) is imposed, so motorboats and other engine-equipped vessels are not permitted. However, other vessels such as canoes and windsurfers are allowed and can often be seen on the lake.

There are various facilities such as the Kurihara City Branch Office and the Hanayama Youth Travel Resort nearby, as well as various leisure installations such as a tennis court and camping ground. Directly downstream is the Ushibuchi Public Park, which serves as a community space. During the fall, the park is well known for being the meeting spot for viewing the autumn foliage, and in October, the "Lake Autumn Festival" is held, where it is possible to enjoy a hot pot of locally harvested wild vegetables and local Miyagi Wagyu steak while viewing the autumn foliage as it reflects on the lake. Also nearby are the ruins of Hanayama Castle, an Abe clan stronghold occupied during the Former Nine Years' War, the ruins of the Hanayama Village Nuruyu Gobansho (guard post) of the Sendai Domain, which is designated as a national historic site, Oda Dam, and the Hosokura Mine Park. Located upstream in the upper reaches of the mountain are many hot springs, such as Nuruyu Onsen and Yunokura Onsen. However, the road beyond Nuruyu Onsen is closed during the winter season. Naruko Onsen is located close by.

Access to the Hanayama dam and lake is achieved by driving approximately 30 minutes from the Tukidate Interchange on the Tōhoku Expressway via Japan National Route 4 to Route 398. The nearest access to public transportation from the dam is the JR East Rikuu East Line's Ikedzuki station.
