= Naganuma (disambiguation) =

Naganuma, Hokkaidō, is a town in Japan.

Naganuma may also refer to:

== Places ==
- Naganuma, Fukushima, Japan
- Naganuma, Tochigi, Japan
- Naganuma Dam (Miyagi), in Tome, Miyagi, Japan

== People with the surname ==
- Hidehisa Naganuma, Japanese mathematician, who introduced Doi–Naganuma lifting in mathematics
- Hideki Naganuma (born 1972), Japanese video game composer
- Hiroshi Naganuma (born 1965), professional shogi player
- Ken Naganuma (1930–2008), Japanese football player and manager
- Myōkō Naganuma (1889–1957), vice-president of Risshō Kōsei Kai
- Yoichi Naganuma (born 1997), Japanese professional footballer

== Other uses ==
- 15350 Naganuma, an asteroid
