= Naganuma Dam =

Naganuma Dam may refer to:

- Naganuma Dam (Akita), an earth fill dam located in Akita Prefecture, Japan
- Naganuma Dam (Miyagi), a dam in the city of Tome, Miyagi, Japan
