= Miyagi University =

Higher education institution in Miyagi, Japan

- 宮城大学
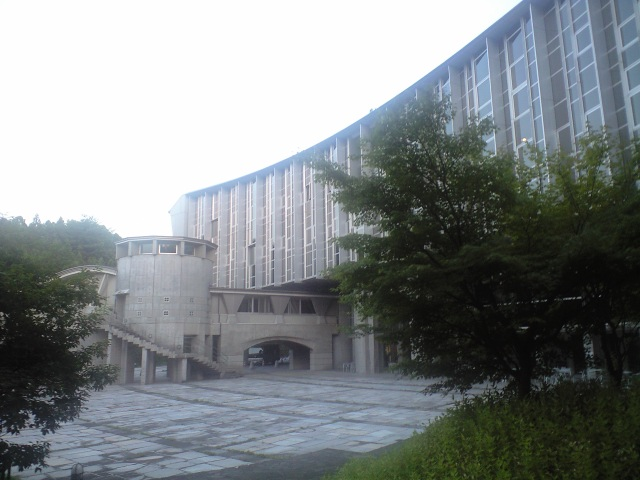
- HQ Building of Miyagi University
- Motto in English: "Hospitality and Amenity"
- Type: Public
- Established: 1997
- Students: 1,904（2024）
- Location: Taiwa, Miyagi Prefecture, Japan; 38°20′54″N 140°50′22″E
- Campus: Taiwa, Miyagi 38°20′54″N 140°50′22.4″E Taihaku-ku, Sendai 38°13′25.3″N 140°48′59.7″E
- Nickname: MYU
- Website: www.myu.ac.jp/english/
- Japan Miyagi Prefecture Miyagi University (Japan)

Miyagi University (宮城大学, Miyagi Daigaku), abbreviated as MYU or Miya-Dai, is a public university located in Miyagi Prefecture, Japan. Established in 1997, the university has two campuses in Miyagi Prefecture, after merging with Miyagi Agricultural College in 2005.

== History ==
In 1997, Miyagi University was established in the town of Taiwa in Kurokawa District, Miyagi with a school of nursing and school of project design. In 2001, university officials established graduate school programs for nursing and project design.

Miyagi Agricultural College, a junior college located in Taihaku-ku, Sendai, was merged with Miyagi University in 2005, and the school of food, agricultural, and environmental sciences was opened in the same year.

== Faculties (undergraduate schools) ==
- School of Nursing
- School of Project Design
- School of Food Industrial Sciences

== Graduate schools ==
- Graduate School of Nursing
- Graduate School of Project Design
- Graduate School of Food, Agricultural and Environmental Sciences
