= Taiwa, Miyagi =

Taiwa 大和町
- Town
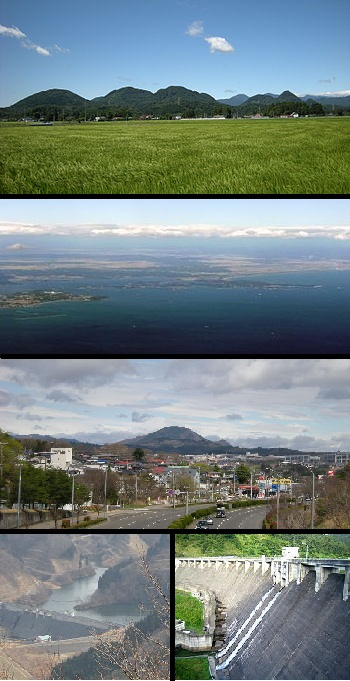
- Nanatsu Mori Forest, Omatsuzawa, Sasakurayama, Miyatoko Dam, Minamikawa Dam

- Flag Seal

- Location of Taiwa in Miyagi Prefecture

- Coordinates: 38°26′14.4″N 140°53′10.9″E
- Country: Japan
- Region: Tōhoku
- Prefecture: Miyagi
- District: Kurokawa

Area
  - Total: 225.49 km^{2} (87.06 sq mi)

Population (May 31, 2020)
  - Total: 28,436
  - Density: 126.11/km^{2} (326.62/sq mi)
- Time zone: UTC+9 (Japan Standard Time)
- Tree: Maple
- Flower: Azalea
- Phone number: 022-345-1111
- Address: 1-1 Yoshioka Nishi-Enoki, Taiwa-chō, Kurokawa-gun, Miyagi-ken 981-3680
- Website: Official website

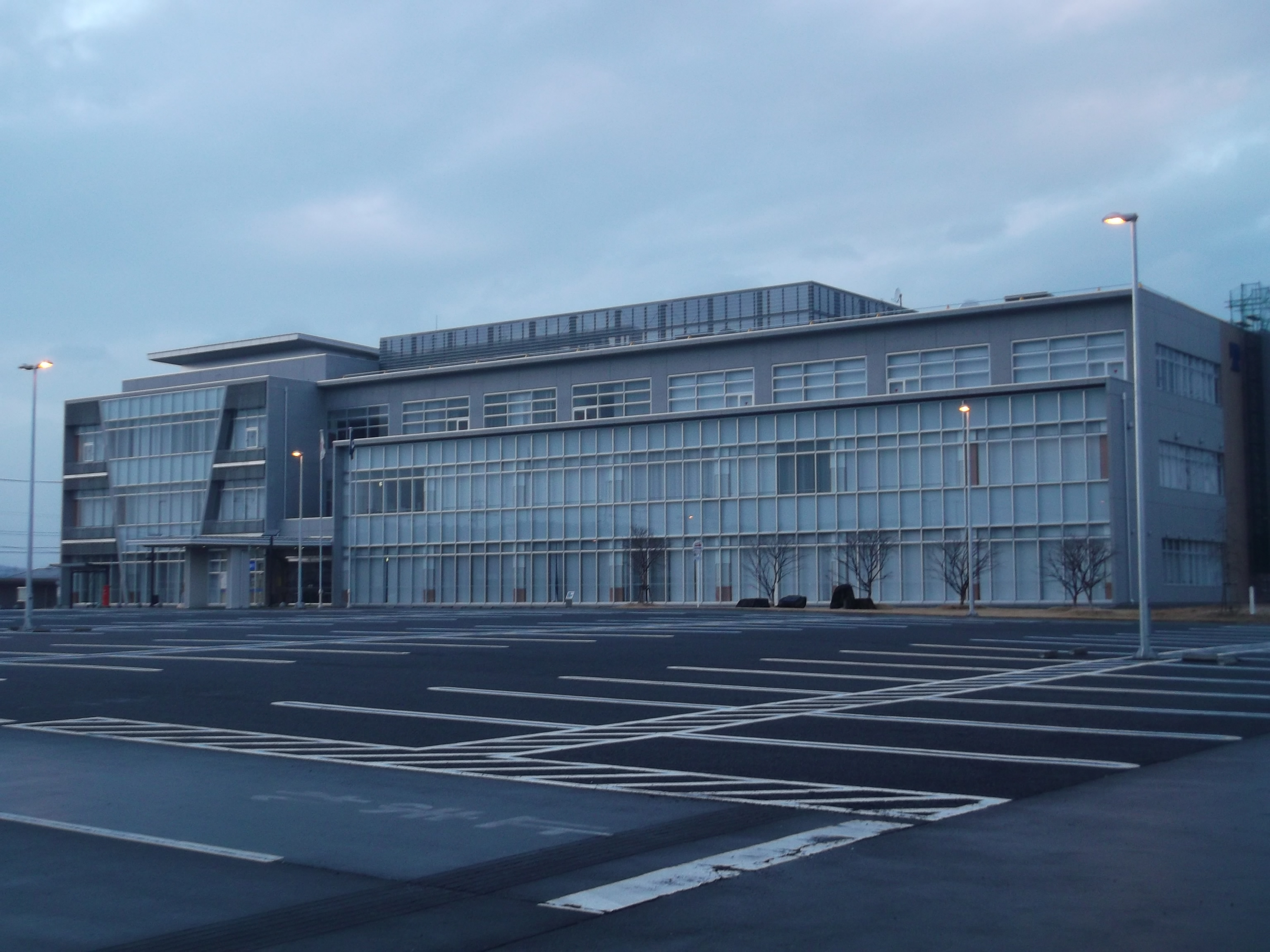
Taiwa Town Hall

Taiwa (大和町, Taiwa-chō) is a town located in Miyagi Prefecture, Japan. As of 31 May 2020, the town had an estimated population of 28,436, and a population density of 130 persons per km^{2} in 12,016 households. The total area of the town is 225.49 square kilometres (87.06 sq mi).

== Geography ==
Taiwa is located in central Miyagi Prefecture, bordered to the south by the metropolis of Sendai. Much of the area of the town is forested.

=== Neighboring municipalities ===
Miyagi Prefecture

- Ōsaki
- Ōsato
- Rifu
- Sendai
- Shikama
- Tomiya

=== Climate ===
The town has a climate characterized by cool summers and long cold winters (Köppen climate classification Cfa). The average annual temperature in Taiwa is 11.6 °C. The average annual rainfall is 1292 mm with September as the wettest month. The temperatures are highest on average in August, at around 24.5 °C, and lowest in January, at around -0.3 °C.

== Demographics ==
Per Japanese census data, the population of Taiwa has grown over the past 50 years.

Historical population
Year	Pop.	±%
1920	12,960	—
1930	13,882	+7.1%
1940	14,872	+7.1%
1950	19,206	+29.1%
1960	20,163	+5.0%
1970	18,028	−10.6%
1980	18,662	+3.5%
1990	18,814	+0.8%
2000	24,419	+29.8%
2010	28,244	+15.7%
2020	28,786	+1.9%

== History ==
The area of present-day Taiwa was part of ancient Mutsu Province, and has been settled since at least the Jōmon period by the Emishi people. Numerous kofun were built in the area during the Kofun period. During later portion of the Heian period, the area was ruled by the Northern Fujiwara. During the Sengoku period, the area was contested by various samurai clans before the area came under the control of the Date clan of Sendai Domain during the Edo period, under the Tokugawa shogunate. Yoshioka-juku developed as a major post station on the Ōshū Kaidō during this time. Following the Meiji restoration, the town of Yoshioka was established with the creation of the modern municipalities system.

The town of Taiwa was created on April 20, 1955, as a result of a merger between the town of Yoshioka, and the villages of Miyatoko, Yoshida, Tsurusu, and Ochiai, all within Kurokawa District.

== Government ==
Taiwa has a mayor-council form of government with a directly elected mayor and a unicameral town council of 18 members. Taiwa, together with the rest of Kurokawa District and the city of Tomiya collectively contributes two seats to the Miyagi Prefectural legislature. In terms of national politics, the town is part of Miyagi 5th district of the lower house of the Diet of Japan.

== Economy ==
Taiwa contains many industrial parks, and has a strong manufacturing base.

== Education ==
- Miyagi University
- Taiwa has six public elementary schools and two public high schools operated by the town government, and one public high school operated by the Miyagi Prefectural Board of Education.

== Transportation ==
=== Railway ===
Taiwa does not have any passenger railway service.

=== Highway ===
- Tōhoku Expressway - Taiwa IC
- National Route 4
- National Route 47
- National Route 457

== Local attractions ==
- Minamikawa Dam
- Miyatoko Dam
- Nanatsumori
- Yoshioka Hachiman Jinja
