= Aoshita No.2 Dam =

Dam in Miyagi Prefecture, Japan

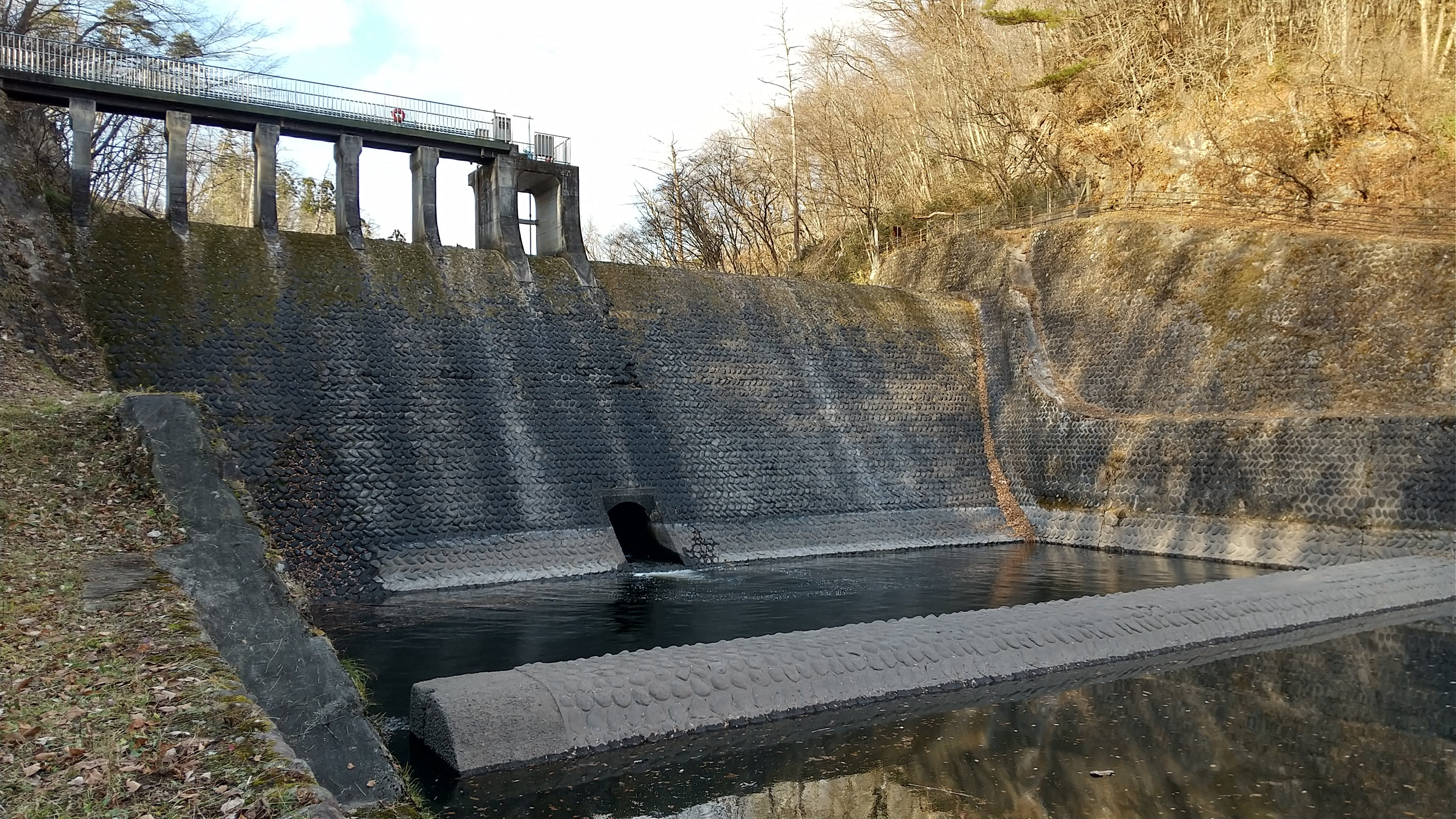

- Location within Japan
- Interactive map of Aoshita No.2 Dam
- Official name: 青下第２ダム
- Location: Miyagi Prefecture, Japan
- Coordinates: 38°18′07″N 140°41′45″E
- Construction began: 1931
- Opening date: 1933

Dam and spillways
- Height: 17.4 m (57 ft)
- Length: 39.2 m (129 ft)

Reservoir
- Total capacity: 212 thousand cubic meters
- Catchment area: 19.8 sq. km
- Surface area: 4 hectares

Aoshita No.2 Dam (Japanese: 青下第２ダム) is a gravity dam located in Miyagi Prefecture in Japan. The dam is used for water supply. The catchment area of the dam is 19.8 km^{2}. The dam impounds about 4 ha of land when full and can store 212 thousand cubic meters of water. The construction of the dam was started on 1931 and completed in 1933.

== See also ==
- List of dams in Japan
