= Sugo Dam (Miyagi) =

Dam in Miyagi Prefecture, Japan

- Location within Japan
- Official name: 菅生ダム
- Location: Miyagi Prefecture, Japan
- Coordinates: 38°43′26″N 140°51′33″E
- Construction began: 1975
- Opening date: 1997

Dam and spillways
- Height: 27.6 m (91 ft)
- Length: 257.2 m (844 ft)

Reservoir
- Total capacity: 1,500,000 m^{3} (53,000,000 cu ft)
- Catchment area: 4.3 km^{2} (1.7 sq mi)
- Surface area: 18 hectares (44 acres)

Sugo Dam (Japanese: 菅生ダム) is an earthfill dam located in Miyagi Prefecture in Japan. The dam is used for irrigation. The catchment area of the dam is 4.3 km^{2}. The dam impounds about 18 ha of land when full and can store 1500 thousand cubic meters of water. The construction of the dam was started on 1975 and completed in 1997.

== See also ==
- List of dams in Japan
