= Aoshita No.3 Dam =

Dam in Miyagi Prefecture, Japan

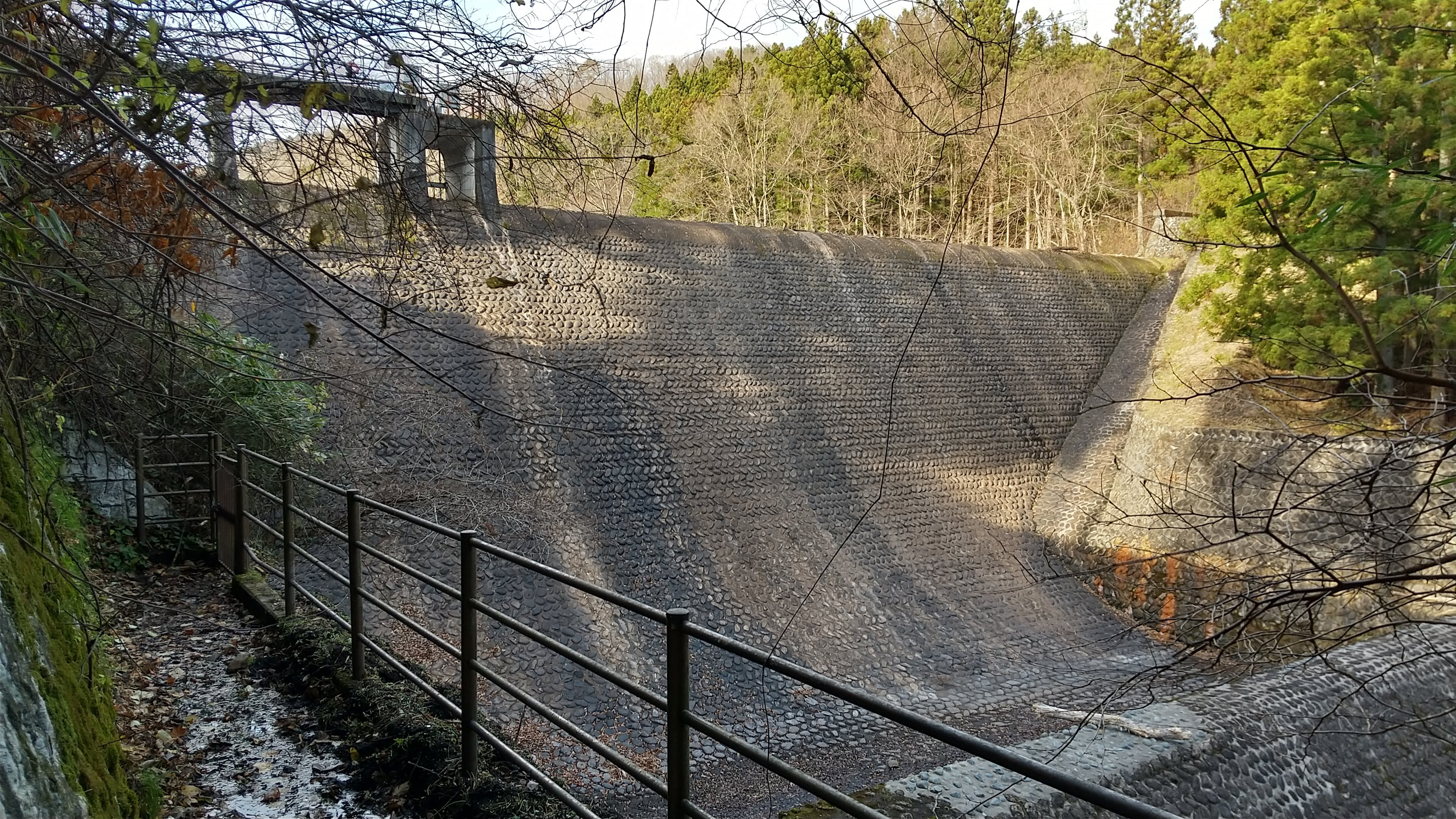

- Location within Japan
- Interactive map of Aoshita No.3 Dam
- Official name: 青下第３ダム
- Location: Miyagi Prefecture, Japan
- Coordinates: 38°18′29″N 140°41′28″E
- Construction began: 1931
- Opening date: 1933

Dam and spillways
- Height: 17.7 m (58 ft)
- Length: 60.4 m (198 ft)

Reservoir
- Total capacity: 264 thousand cubic meters
- Catchment area: 19.1 sq. km
- Surface area: 3 hectares

Aoshita No.3 Dam (Japanese: 青下第３ダム) is a gravity dam located in Miyagi Prefecture in Japan. The dam is used for water supply. The catchment area of the dam is 19.1 km^{2}. The dam impounds about 3 ha of land when full and can store 264 thousand cubic meters of water. The construction of the dam was started on 1931 and completed in 1933.

== See also ==
- List of dams in Japan
