= Miyatoko Dam =

Dam in Miyagi Prefecture, Japan

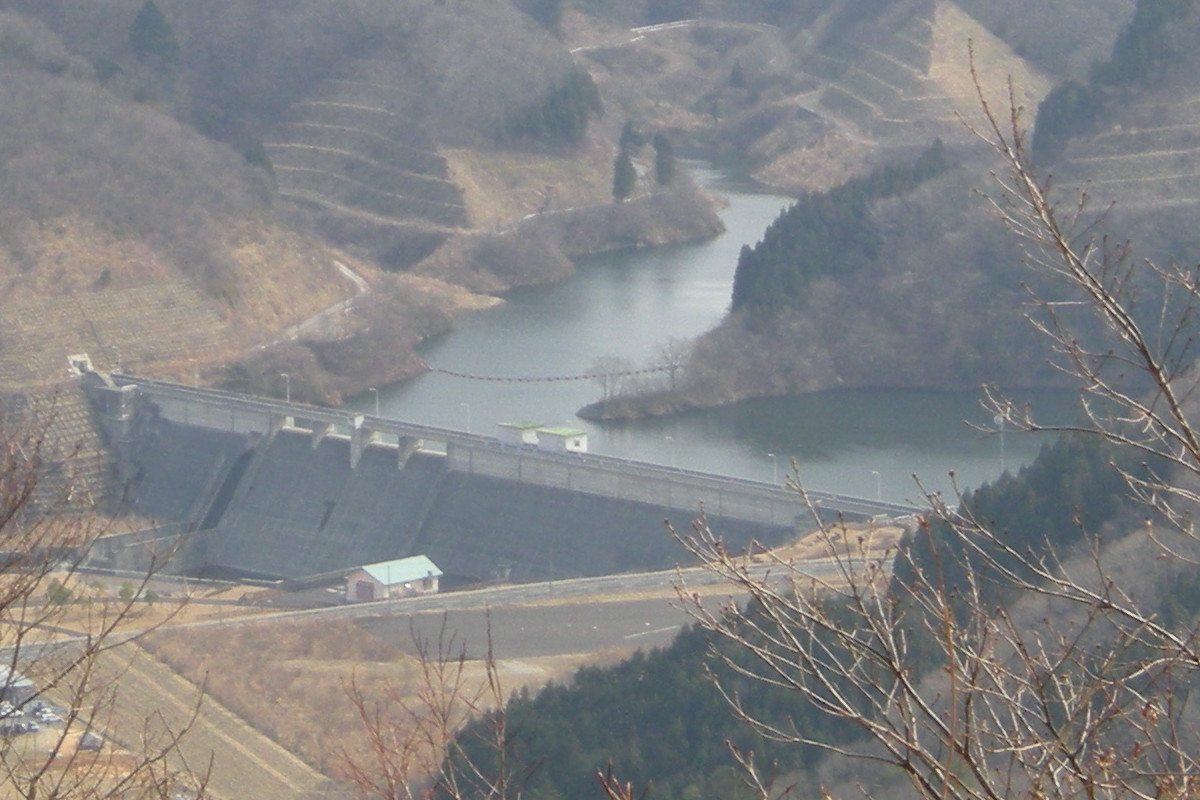
- Miyatoko Dam from Sasakurayama

- Location within Miyagi Prefecture Location within Japan
- Official name: 宮床ダム
- Location: Taiwa, Miyagi, Japan
- Coordinates: 38°23′13″N 140°49′20″E
- Construction began: 1979
- Opening date: 1998

Dam and spillways
- Type of dam: Concrete Gravity Dam
- Impounds: Miyatoko River
- Height: 48 m (157 ft)
- Length: 256 m (840 ft)
- Dam volume: 329,000 m^{3}

Reservoir
- Creates: Lake Asahina
- Total capacity: 5,000,000 m^{3}
- Catchment area: 10.8 km^{2}.
- Surface area: 43 hectares (110 acres)

Miyatoko Dam' (宮床ダム, Miyatoko damu) is a multi-purpose dam on the Miyatoko River, a branch of the Naruse River in the town of Taiwa, Kurokawa District Miyagi Prefecture, Japan. The dam was completed in 1998.
