= Murata Dam =

Dam in Miyagi Prefecture, Japan

- Location within Japan
- Official name: 村田ダム
- Location: Miyagi Prefecture, Japan
- Coordinates: 38°8′56″N 140°41′15″E
- Construction began: 1972
- Opening date: 1979

Dam and spillways
- Height: 36.7 m (120 ft)
- Length: 182 m (597 ft)

Reservoir
- Total capacity: 1660 thousand cubic meters
- Catchment area: 8.5 sq. km
- Surface area: 17 hectares

Murata Dam (Japanese: 村田ダム) is an earthfill dam located in Miyagi Prefecture in Japan. The dam is used for irrigation. The catchment area of the dam is 8.5 km^{2}. The dam impounds about 17 ha of land when full and can store 1660 thousand cubic meters of water. The construction of the dam was started on 1972 and completed in 1979.

== See also ==
- List of dams in Japan
