= Honokawa Dam =

Dam in Miyagi Prefecture, Japan

- Location within Japan
- Interactive map of Honokawa Dam
- Official name: 保野川ダム
- Location: Miyagi Prefecture, Japan
- Coordinates: 38°30′51″N 140°44′45″E
- Construction began: 1981
- Opening date: 1999

Dam and spillways
- Height: 41.4 m (136 ft)
- Length: 223 m (732 ft)

Reservoir
- Total capacity: 360 thousand cubic meters
- Catchment area: 2.5 sq. km
- Surface area: 5 hectares

Honokawa Dam (Japanese: 保野川ダム) is a rockfill dam located in Miyagi Prefecture in Japan. The dam is used for irrigation. The catchment area of the dam is 2.5 km^{2}. The dam impounds about 5 ha of land when full and can store 360 thousand cubic meters of water. The construction of the dam was started on 1981 and completed in 1999.

== See also ==
- List of dams in Japan
