= Futatsuishi Dam =

Dam in Miyagi Prefecture, Japan

- Location within Japan
- Interactive map of Futatsuishi Dam
- Official name: 二ツ石ダム
- Location: Miyagi Prefecture, Japan
- Coordinates: 38°38′31″N 140°39′20″E
- Construction began: 1988
- Opening date: 2009

Dam and spillways
- Height: 70.5 m (231 ft)
- Length: 439 m (1,440 ft)

Reservoir
- Total capacity: 10600 thousand cubic meters
- Catchment area: 19 sq. km
- Surface area: 52 hectares

Futatsuishi Dam (Japanese: 二ツ石ダム) is a rockfill dam located in Miyagi Prefecture in Japan. The dam is used for irrigation. The catchment area of the dam is 19 km^{2}. The dam impounds about 52 ha of land when full and can store 10600 thousand cubic meters of water. The construction of the dam was started on 1988 and completed in 2009.

== See also ==
- List of dams in Japan
