= Moriyoshi Dam =

Dam in Akita Prefecture, Japan

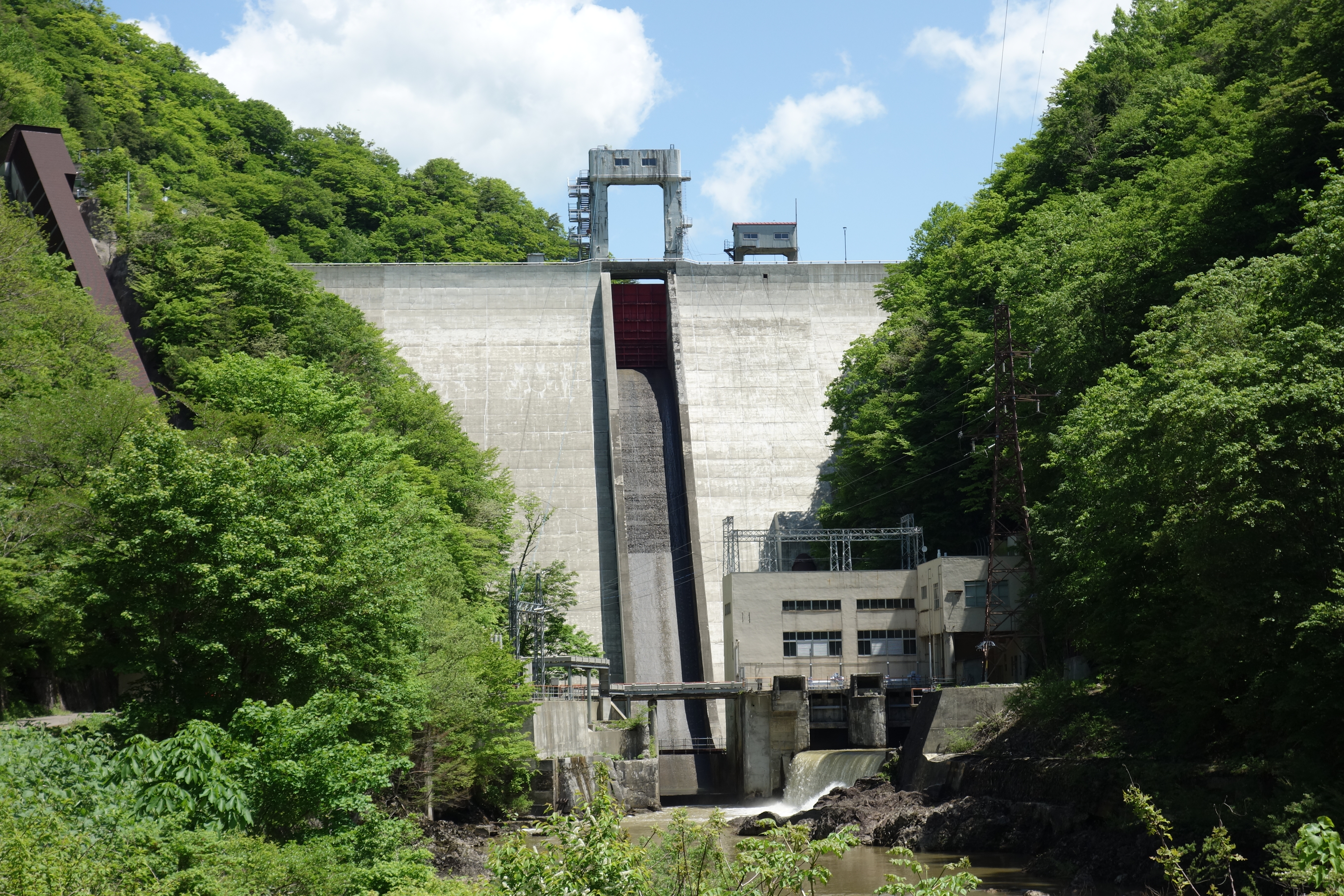

- Location within Japan
- Location: Akita Prefecture, Japan
- Coordinates: 40°2′52″N 140°36′23″E
- Construction began: 1951
- Opening date: 1952

Dam and spillways
- Height: 62 m (203 ft)
- Length: 105 m (344 ft)

Reservoir
- Total capacity: 37200 thousand cubic meters
- Catchment area: 139 sq. km
- Surface area: 156 hectares

Moriyoshi Dam is a gravity dam located in Akita Prefecture in Japan. The dam is used for flood control and power production. The catchment area of the dam is 139 km^{2}. The dam impounds about 156 ha of land when full and can store 37200 thousand cubic meters of water. The construction of the dam was started on 1951 and completed in 1952.
