= Gandozawa Dam =

Dam in Miyagi Prefecture, Japan

- Location within Japan
- Interactive map of Gandozawa Dam
- Official name: 岩堂沢ダム
- Location: Miyagi Prefecture, Japan
- Coordinates: 38°41′48″N 140°38′18″E
- Construction began: 1993
- Opening date: 2009

Dam and spillways
- Height: 68 m (223 ft)
- Length: 200 m (660 ft)

Reservoir
- Total capacity: 13480 thousand cubic meters
- Surface area: 69 hectares

Gandozawa Dam (Japanese: 岩堂沢ダム) is a gravity dam located in Miyagi Prefecture in Japan. The dam is used for irrigation. The dam impounds about 69 ha of land when full and can store 13480 thousand cubic meters of water. The construction of the dam was started on 1993 and completed in 2009.

== See also ==
- List of dams in Japan
