= Odo Dam =

Dam in Kochi Prefecture, Japan

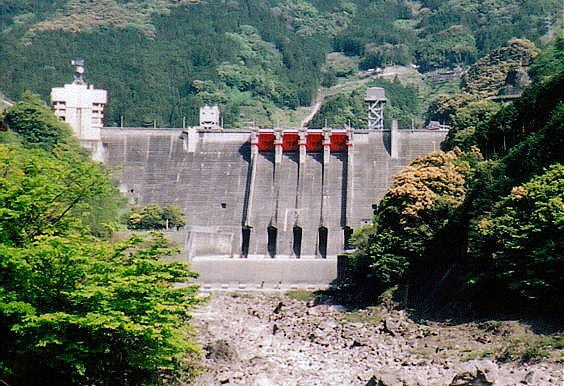

- Location within Japan
- Official name: 大渡ダム
- Location: Kochi Prefecture, Japan
- Coordinates: 33°32′42″N 133°6′57″E
- Construction began: 1966
- Opening date: 1986

Dam and spillways
- Height: 96 m (315 ft)
- Length: 325 m (1,066 ft)

Reservoir
- Total capacity: 66 million m^{3}
- Catchment area: 688.9 km^{2}
- Surface area: 201 hectares (500 acres)

Odo Dam (Japanese: 大渡ダム) is a gravity dam located in Kochi Prefecture in Japan. The dam is used for flood control, water supply and power production. The catchment area of the dam is 688.9 km^{2}. The dam impounds about 201 hectares of land when full and can store 66 million cubic meters of water. The construction of the dam was started on 1966 and completed in 1986.
