= Tutusago Dam =

Dam in Miyagi Prefecture, Japan

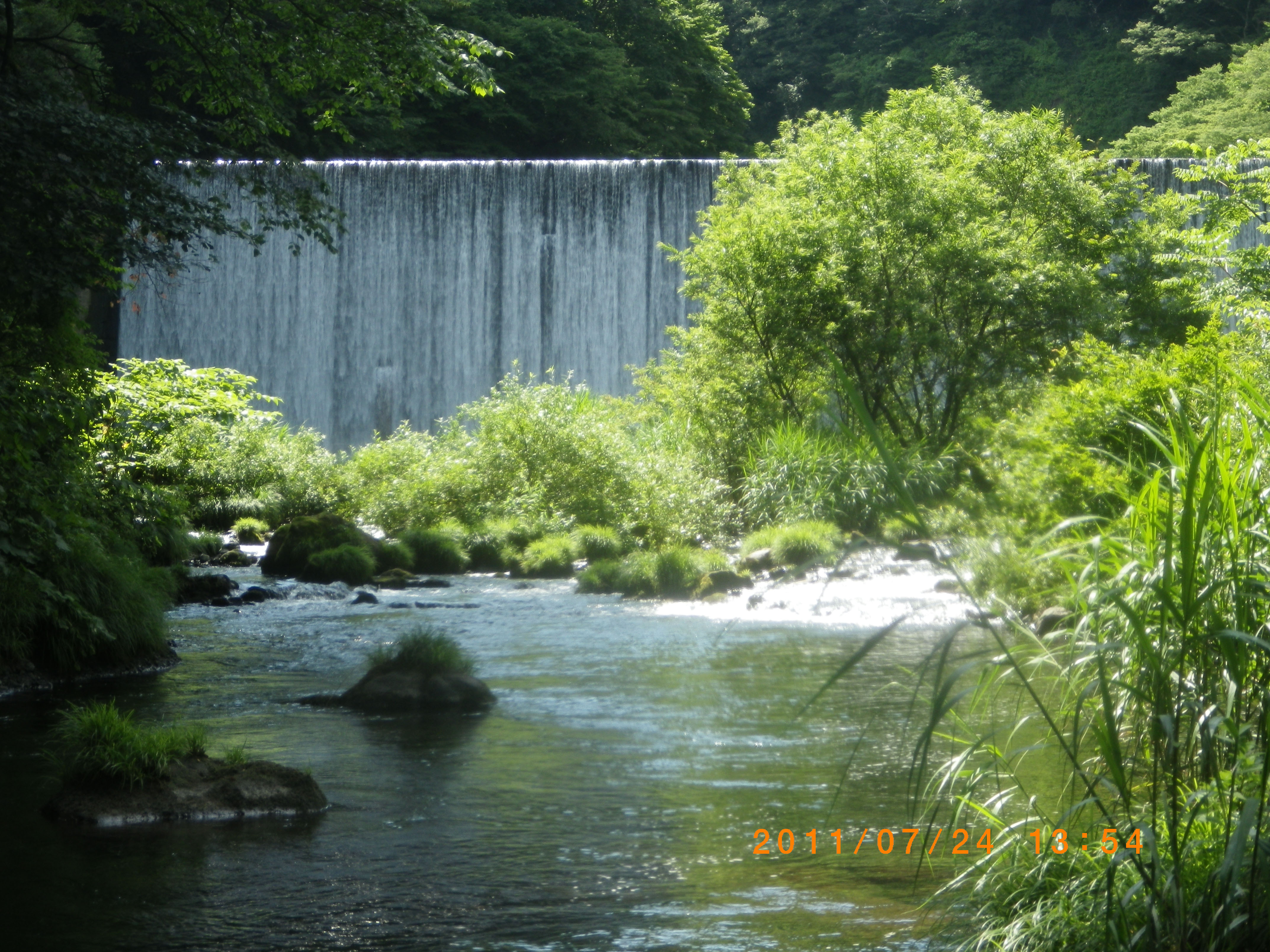

- Location within Japan
- Official name: 筒砂子ダム
- Location: Miyagi Prefecture, Japan
- Coordinates: 38°34′58″N 140°38′27″E
- Construction began: 2013

Dam and spillways
- Height: 105 m (344 ft)
- Length: 345.8 m (1,135 ft)

Reservoir
- Total capacity: 45,700,000 m^{3} (1.61×10^{9} cu ft)
- Catchment area: 42.4 km^{2} (16.4 sq mi)
- Surface area: 151 hectares (370 acres)

Tutusago Dam (Japanese: 筒砂子ダム) is a trapezoidal dam located in Miyagi Prefecture in Japan. The dam is used for flood control, irrigation and power production. The catchment area of the dam is 42.4 km^{2}. The dam impounds about 151 ha of land when full and can store 45700 thousand cubic meters of water. The construction of the dam was started on 2013.

== See also ==
- List of dams in Japan
