= Ushino Dam =

Dam in Miyagi Prefecture, Japan

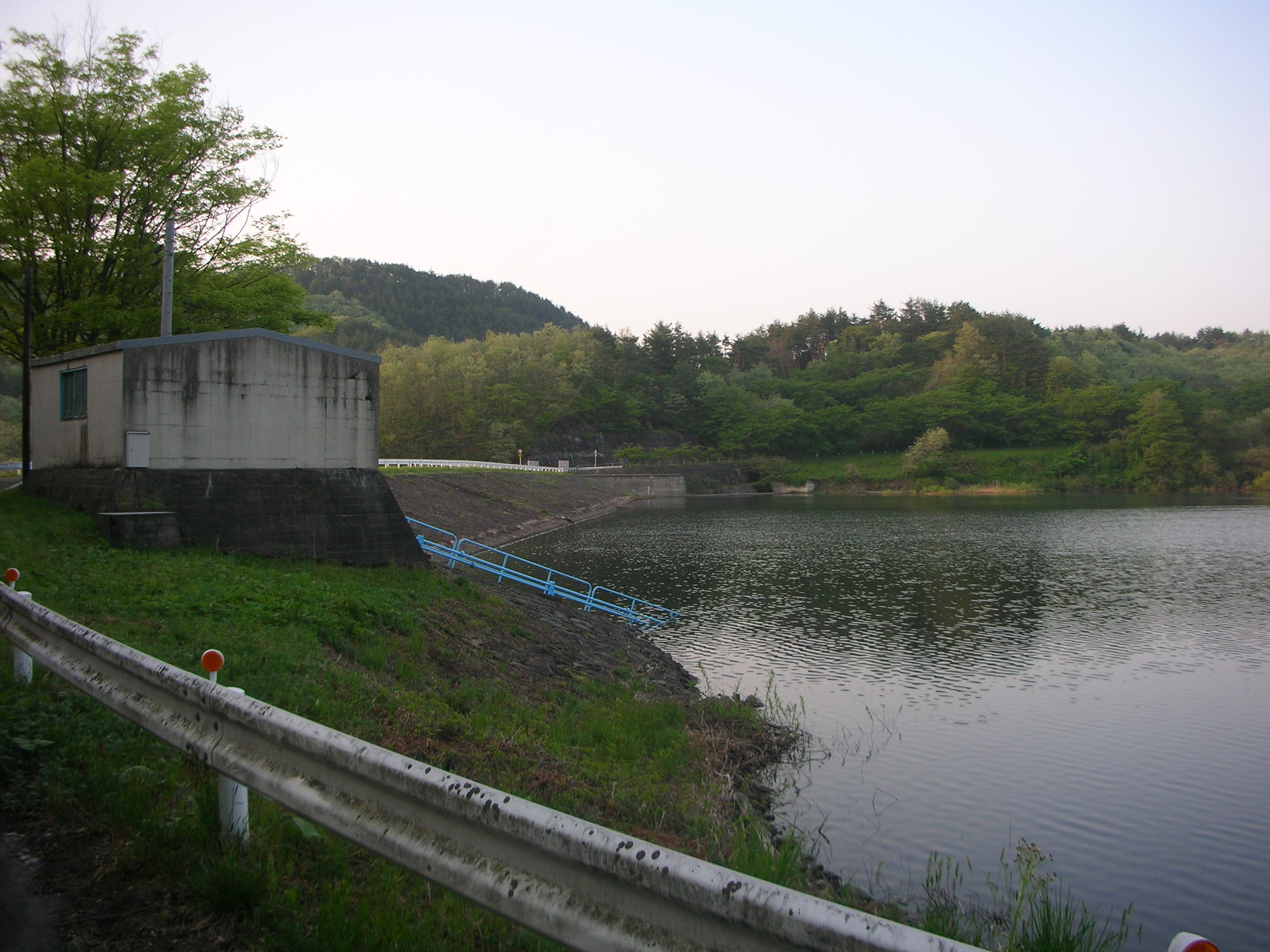

- Location within Japan
- Official name: 牛野ダム
- Location: Miyagi Prefecture, Japan
- Coordinates: 38°28′46″N 140°48′42″E
- Opening date: 1972

Dam and spillways
- Height: 21.4 m (70 ft)
- Length: 160.1 m (525 ft)

Reservoir
- Total capacity: 500,000 m^{3} (18,000,000 cu ft)
- Catchment area: 3 km^{2} (1.2 sq mi)
- Surface area: 12 hectares (30 acres)

Ushino Dam (Japanese: 牛野ダム) is a rockfill dam located in Miyagi Prefecture in Japan. The dam is used for irrigation. The catchment area of the dam is 3 km^{2}. The dam impounds about 12 ha of land when full and can store 500 thousand cubic meters of water. The construction of the dam was completed in 1972.

== See also ==
- List of dams in Japan
