= Nanakita Dam =

Dam in Miyagi Prefecture, Japan

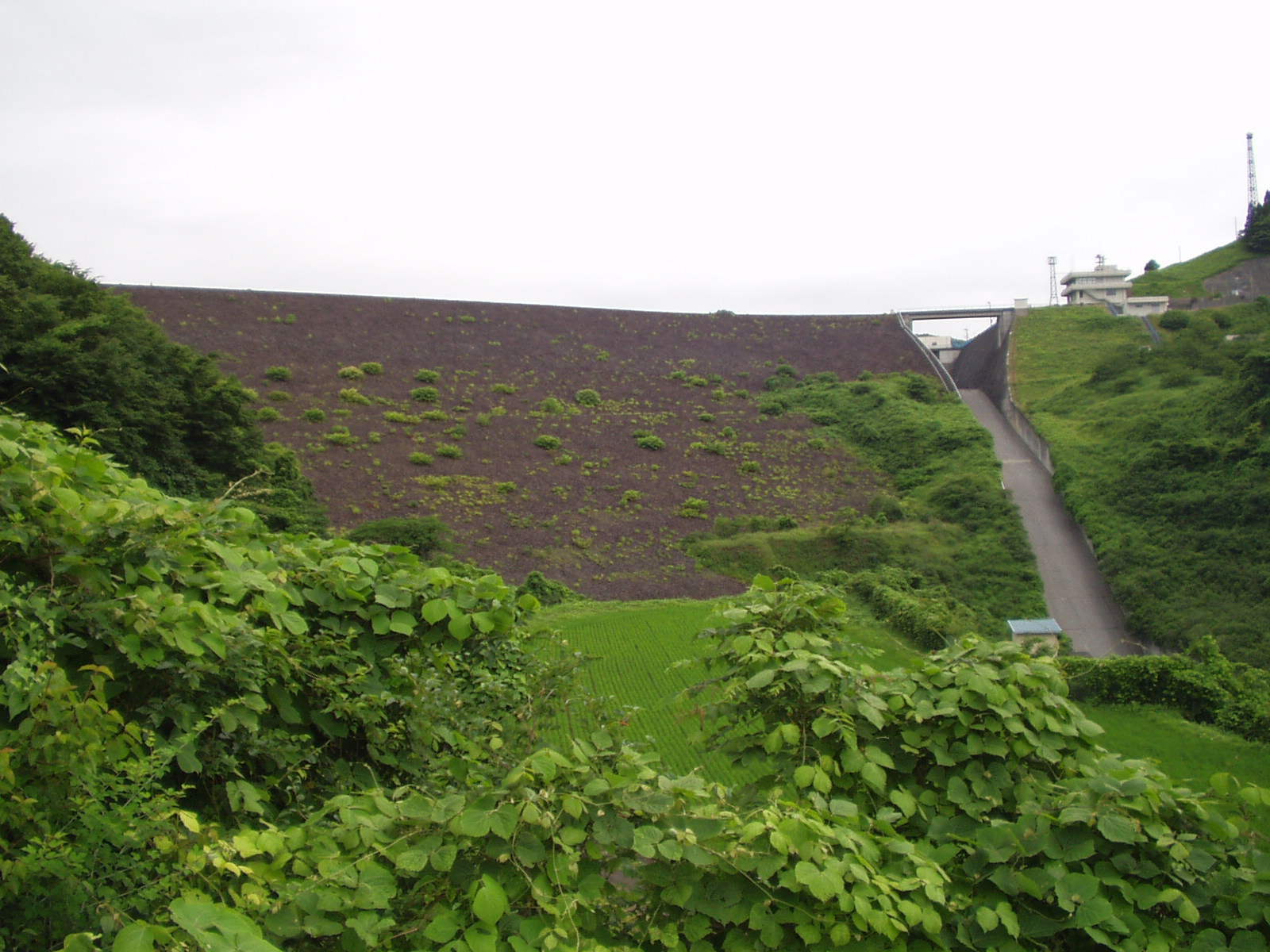

- Location within Miyagi Prefecture Location within Japan
- Location: Izumi-ku, Sendai, Miyagi Prefecture, Japan
- Coordinates: 38°21′27″N 140°44′13″E
- Construction began: 1972
- Opening date: 1984
- Owner: Miyagi Prefecture

Dam and spillways
- Type of dam: Rockfill dam
- Height: 74 m (243 ft)
- Length: 420 m (1,380 ft)

Reservoir
- Total capacity: 9,200,000 m^{3}
- Catchment area: 20 km^{2}
- Surface area: 50 hectares (120 acres)

Nanakita Dam (Japanese: 七北田ダム) is a rock-filled dam in Izumi-ku, Sendai, Miyagi Prefecture, Japan, completed in 1984.
