= Kejyonuma Dam =

Dam in Miyagi Prefecture, Japan

Kejonuma Dam
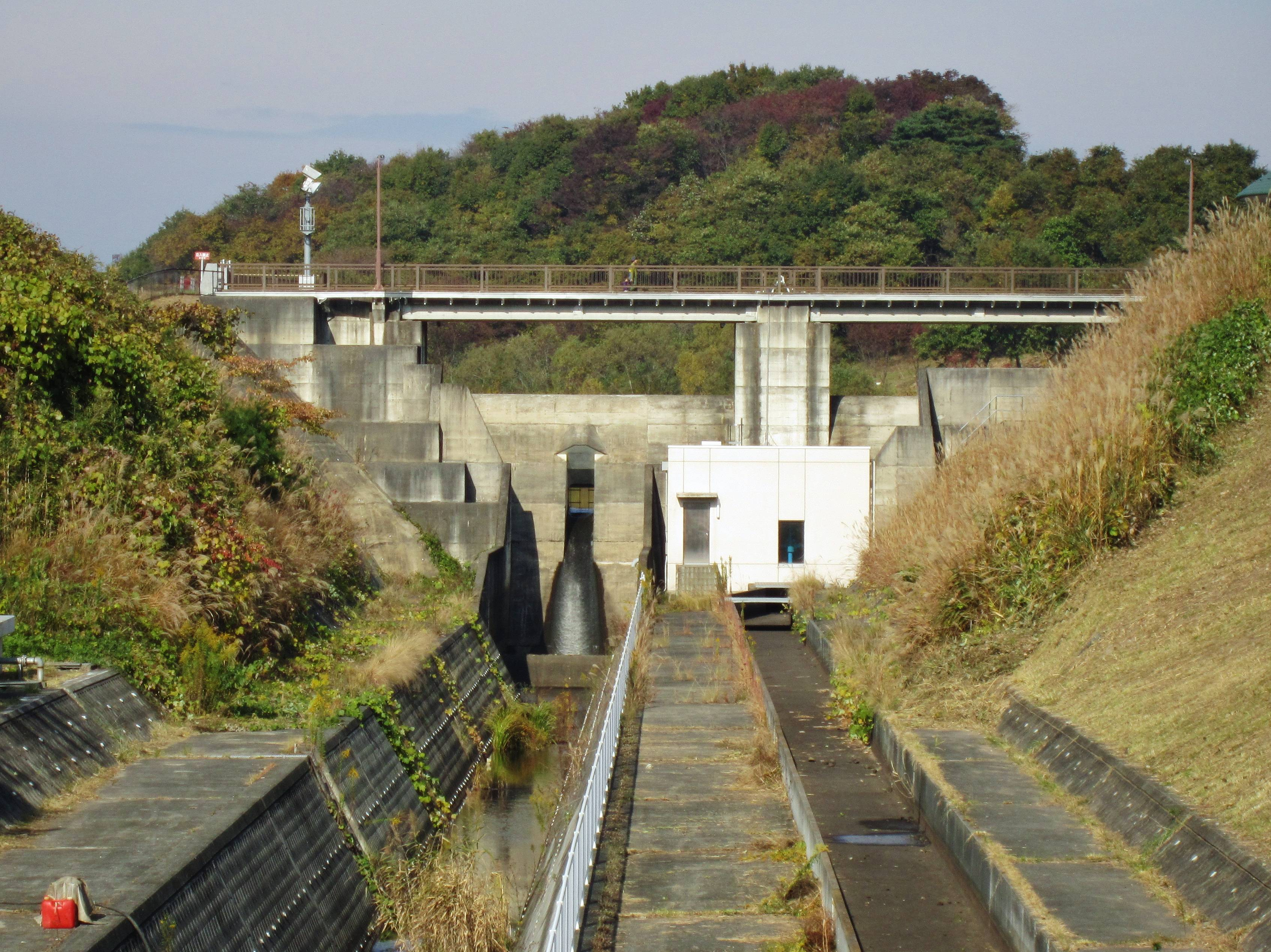

- Location within Miyagi Prefecture Location within Japan
- Location: Ōsaki, Miyagi, Japan
- Coordinates: 38°37′36″N 140°57′50″E
- Construction began: 1980
- Opening date: 1995
- Owner: Miyagi Prefecture

Dam and spillways
- Type of dam: Earthen dam
- Height: 24 m (79 ft)
- Length: 260 m (850 ft)

Reservoir
- Creates: Lake Kejonuma
- Total capacity: 2,880,000 m^{3}
- Catchment area: 9.93 km^{2}
- Surface area: 65 hectares (160 acres)

Ramsar Wetland
- Official name: Kejo-numa
- Designated: 31 October 2008
- Reference no.: 1843

Kejonuma Dam (Japanese: 化女沼ダム) is an earthen dam in the city of Ōsaki, Miyagi Prefecture, Japan, completed in 1995. The dam crosses the Tajiri River, a branch of the Kitakami River and utilises the basin of a pre-existing natural lake.

A 34 hectare portion of the wetlands at Lake Kejonuma has been protected since October 2008 as a Ramsar site in Japan.
