= Tarumizu Dam =

Dam in Miyagi Prefecture, Japan

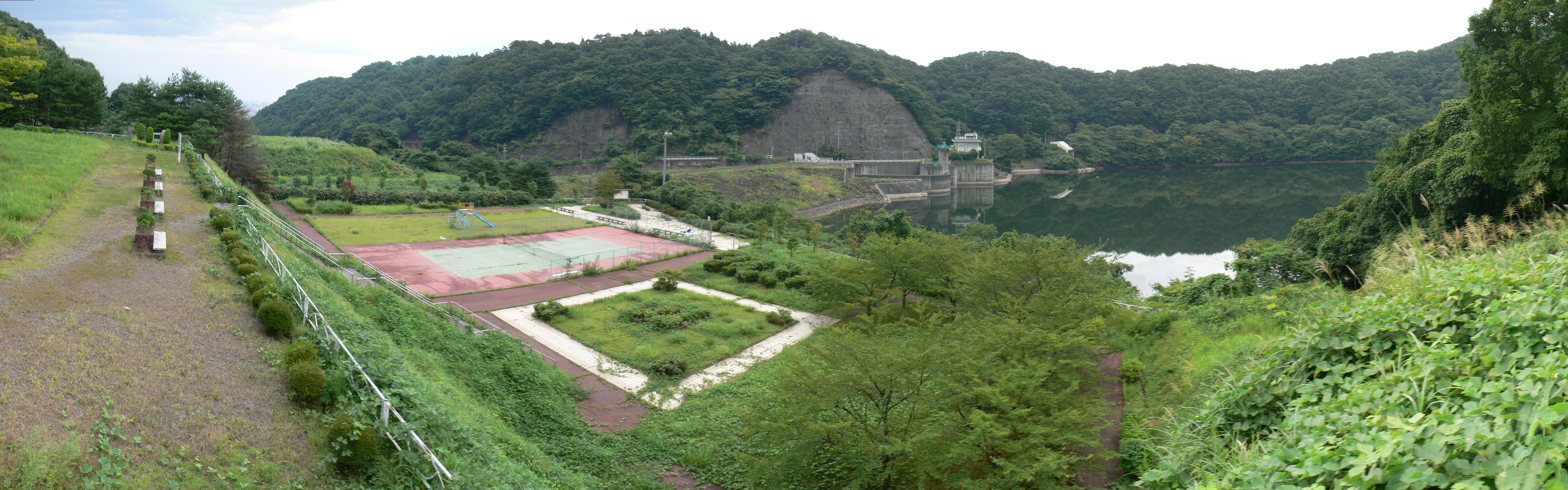

- Location within Japan
- Official name: 樽水ダム
- Location: Miyagi Prefecture, Japan
- Coordinates: 38°10′44″N 140°50′31″E
- Construction began: 1965
- Opening date: 1976

Dam and spillways
- Height: 43 m (141 ft)
- Length: 256.5 m (842 ft)

Reservoir
- Total capacity: 4,700,000 m^{3} (170,000,000 cu ft)
- Catchment area: 9.7 km^{2} (3.7 sq mi)
- Surface area: 41 hectares (100 acres)

Tarumizu Dam (Japanese: 樽水ダム) is a rockfill dam located in Miyagi Prefecture in Japan. The dam is used for flood control and water supply. The catchment area of the dam is 9.7 km^{2}. The dam impounds about 41 ha of land when full and can store 4700 thousand cubic meters of water. The construction of the dam was started on 1965 and completed in 1976.

== See also ==
- List of dams in Japan
