= Ayashi Tameike Dam =

Dam in Miyagi Prefecture, Japan

Ayashi Tameike
- Location within Japan
- Interactive map of Ayashi Tameike
- Official name: 愛子溜池
- Location: Miyagi Prefecture, Japan
- Coordinates: 38°15′38″N 140°45′11″E
- Opening date: 1949

Dam and spillways
- Height: 16.7 m (55 ft)
- Length: 114 m (374 ft)

Reservoir
- Total capacity: 1200 thousand cubic meters
- Catchment area: 5.2 sq. km
- Surface area: 19 hectares

Ayashi Tameike (Japanese: 愛子溜池) is an earthfill dam located in Miyagi Prefecture in Japan. The dam is used for irrigation. The catchment area of the dam is 5.2 km^{2}. The dam impounds about 19 ha of land when full and can store 1200 thousand cubic meters of water. The construction of the dam was completed in 1949.

== See also ==
- List of dams in Japan
