= Aikawa Dam =

Dam in Miyagi Prefecture, Japan

- Location within Japan
- Official name: 相川ダム
- Location: Miyagi Prefecture, Japan
- Coordinates: 38°47′44″N 141°16′59″E
- Construction began: 1983
- Opening date: 1996

Dam and spillways
- Height: 40.3 m (132 ft)
- Length: 168 m (551 ft)

Reservoir
- Total capacity: 1770 thousand cubic meters
- Catchment area: 5.6 km^{2}
- Surface area: 17 hectares

Aikawa Dam (Japanese: 相川ダム) is a rockfill dam located in Miyagi Prefecture in Japan. The dam is used for irrigation. The catchment area of the dam is 5.6 km^{2}. The dam impounds about 17 ha of land when full and can store 1770 thousand cubic meters of water. The construction of the dam was started on 1983 and completed in 1996. The dam is constructed in Aikawa river.

== See also ==
- List of dams in Japan
