= Kawarago Dam =

Dam in Miyagi Prefecture, Japan

- Location within Japan
- Official name: 川原子ダム
- Location: Miyagi Prefecture, Japan
- Coordinates: 38°2′13″N 140°31′34″E
- Opening date: 1969

Dam and spillways
- Height: 20 m (66 ft)
- Length: 121 m (397 ft)

Reservoir
- Total capacity: 2333 thousand cubic meters
- Catchment area: 11 sq. km
- Surface area: 30 hectares

Kawarago Dam (Japanese: 川原子ダム) is an earthfill dam located in Miyagi Prefecture in Japan. The dam is used for irrigation. The catchment area of the dam is 11 km^{2}. The dam impounds about 30 ha of land when full and can store 2333 thousand cubic meters of water. The construction of the dam was completed in 1969.

== See also ==
- List of dams in Japan
