= Hanakawa Dam =

Dam in Miyagi Prefecture, Japan

- Location within Japan
- Interactive map of Hanakawa Dam
- Official name: 花川ダム
- Location: Miyagi Prefecture, Japan
- Coordinates: 38°29′47″N 140°46′21″E
- Opening date: 1964

Dam and spillways
- Height: 26.4 m (87 ft)
- Length: 76.5 m (251 ft)

Reservoir
- Total capacity: 233,000 m^{3} (8,200,000 cu ft)
- Catchment area: 52 km^{2} (20 sq mi)
- Surface area: 4 ha (9.9 acres)

Hanakawa Dam (Japanese: 花川ダム) is a gravity dam located in Miyagi Prefecture in Japan. The dam is used for irrigation. The catchment area of the dam is 52 square kilometres (20 sq mi). The dam impounds about 4 hectares (9.9 acres) of land when full and can store 233,000 cubic metres (8,200,000 cu ft) of water. The construction of the dam was completed in 1964.

== See also ==
- List of dams in Japan
