= Haraikawa Dam =

Dam in Miyagi Prefecture, Japan

- Location within Japan
- Interactive map of Haraikawa Dam
- Official name: 払川ダム
- Location: Miyagi Prefecture, Japan
- Coordinates: 38°43′52″N 141°28′19″E
- Construction began: 1992
- Opening date: 2012

Dam and spillways
- Height: 38.9 m (128 ft)
- Length: 94.5 m (310 ft)

Reservoir
- Total capacity: 950 thousand cubic meters
- Catchment area: 6 sq. km
- Surface area: 8 hectares

Haraikawa Dam (Japanese: 払川ダム) is a gravity dam located in Miyagi Prefecture in Japan. The dam is used for flood control and water supply. The catchment area of the dam is 6 km^{2}. The dam impounds about 8 ha of land when full and can store 950 thousand cubic meters of water. The construction of the dam was started on 1992 and completed in 2012.

== See also ==
- List of dams in Japan
