= Minamikawa Dam =

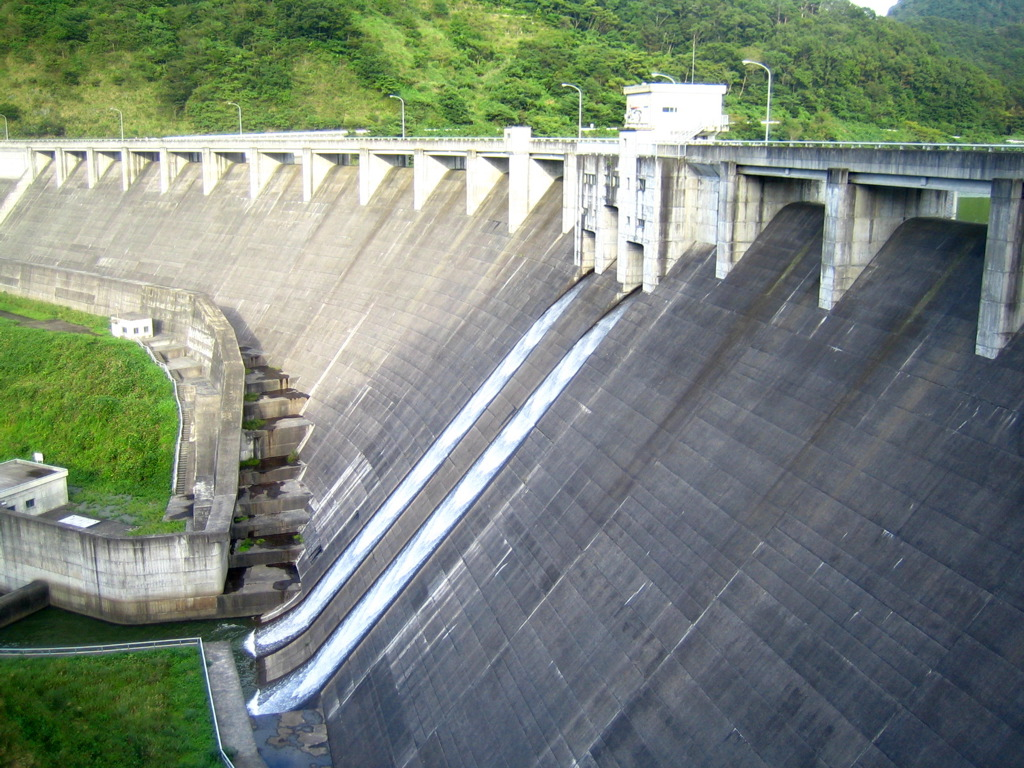
- Minamikawa Dam

- Location within Miyagi Prefecture Location within Japan
- Official name: 南川ダム
- Location: Taiwa, Miyagi, Japan
- Coordinates: 38°26′02″N 140°49′52″E
- Construction began: 1975
- Opening date: 1987
- Owner: Miyagi Prefecture

Dam and spillways
- Type of dam: Concrete Gravity Dam
- Impounds: Naruse River
- Height: 46.0 m (150.9 ft)
- Length: 335.0 m (1,099.1 ft)
- Dam volume: 244,000 cubic meters

Reservoir
- Total capacity: 10,000,000 cubic meters
- Catchment area: 22.5 square kilometers
- Surface area: 90.0 hectares (222 acres)

Power Station
- Installed capacity: 220 KW

Minamikawa Dam (南川ダム, Minamikawa damu)) is a concrete gravity arch dam on the Naruse River in the town of Taiwa, Kurokawa District Miyagi Prefecture, Japan, completed in 1987 by Kumagai. The dam supports a 220 KW hydroelectric power station.

== Design ==
Minamikawa Dam is a hollow-core concrete gravity dam intended for flood control, irrigation water and hydroelectric power. The dam is accompanied by a 19.6 meter high saddle dam to increase its water level.
