= Shukunosawa Dam =

Dam in Miyagi Prefecture, Japan

- Location within Japan
- Official name: 宿の沢ダム
- Location: Miyagi Prefecture, Japan
- Coordinates: 38°40′19″N 140°58′20″E
- Construction began: 1977
- Opening date: 2003

Dam and spillways
- Height: 26 m (85 ft)
- Length: 227.7 m (747 ft)

Reservoir
- Total capacity: 1,210,000 m^{3} (43,000,000 cu ft)
- Catchment area: 1.3 km^{2} (0.5 sq mi)
- Surface area: 22 hectares (54 acres)

Shukunosawa Dam (Japanese: 宿の沢ダム) is an earthfill dam located in Miyagi Prefecture in Japan. The dam is used for irrigation. The catchment area of the dam is 1.3 km^{2} (0.5 sq mi). The dam impounds about 22 ha (54 acres) of land when full and can store 1210 thousand cubic metres of water. The construction of the dam was started on 1977 and completed in 2003.

== See also ==
- List of dams in Japan
