= Sonoseki Dam =

Dam in Miyagi Prefecture, Japan

- Location within Japan
- Official name: 惣の関ダム
- Location: Miyagi Prefecture, Japan
- Coordinates: 38°20′36″N 140°59′21″E
- Construction began: 1988
- Opening date: 1999

Dam and spillways
- Height: 23.5 m (77 ft)
- Length: 115 m (377 ft)

Reservoir
- Total capacity: 1,100,000 m^{3} (39,000,000 cu ft)
- Catchment area: 3.8 km^{2} (1.5 sq mi)
- Surface area: 17 hectares (42 acres)

Sonoseki Dam (Japanese: 惣の関ダム) is a gravity dam located in Miyagi Prefecture in Japan. The dam is used for flood control and water supply. The catchment area of the dam is 3.8 km^{2}. The dam impounds about 17 ha of land when full and can store 1100 thousand cubic meters of water. The construction of the dam was started on 1988 and completed in 1999.

== See also ==
- List of dams in Japan
