= Kadaijin Dam =

Dam in Miyagi Prefecture, Japan

- Location within Japan
- Interactive map of Kadaijin Dam
- Official name: 嘉太神ダム
- Location: Miyagi Prefecture, Japan
- Coordinates: 38°28′06″N 140°45′53″E
- Opening date: 1937

Dam and spillways
- Height: 27 m (89 ft)
- Length: 101 m (331 ft)

Reservoir
- Total capacity: 854 thousand cubic meters
- Catchment area: 15 sq. km
- Surface area: 18 hectares

Kadaijin Dam (Japanese: 嘉太神ダム) is an earthfill dam located in Miyagi Prefecture in Japan. The dam is used for flood control and irrigation. The catchment area of the dam is 15 km^{2}. The dam impounds about 18 ha of land when full and can store 854 thousand cubic meters of water. The construction of the dam was completed in 1937.

== See also ==
- List of dams in Japan
