= Kawauchisawa Dam =

Dam in Miyagi Prefecture, Japan

- Location within Japan
- Official name: 川内沢ダム
- Location: Miyagi Prefecture, Japan
- Coordinates: 38°9′19″N 140°49′50″E
- Construction began: 1997

Dam and spillways
- Height: 39.7 m (130 ft)
- Length: 145 m (476 ft)

Reservoir
- Total capacity: 1790 thousand cubic meters
- Catchment area: 3.7 sq. km
- Surface area: 18 hectares

Kawauchisawa Dam (Japanese: 川内沢ダム) is a gravity dam located in Miyagi Prefecture in Japan. The dam is used for flood control. The catchment area of the dam is 3.7 km^{2}. The dam impounds about 18 ha of land when full and can store 1790 thousand cubic meters of water. The construction of the dam was started on 1997.

== See also ==
- List of dams in Japan
