= Aratozawa Dam =

Dam in Miyagi Prefecture, Japan

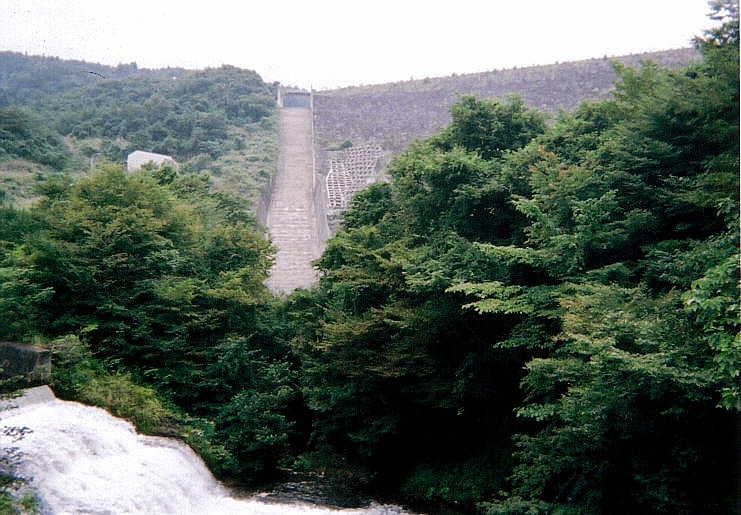

- Location within Miyagi Prefecture Location within Japan
- Location: Nihasama river, Kurihara, Miyagi, Japan
- Coordinates: 38°53′8.6″N 140°51′25.2″E
- Construction began: 1974
- Opening date: 1998
- Owners: Agriculture ministry, Japan

Dam and spillways
- Type of dam: Rockfill, Agricultural irrigation, Flood control, Hydro-electric power generation
- Height: 74.4 m (244 ft)
- Length: 413.7 m (1,357 ft)
- Dam volume: 3,048,000 m^{3}

Reservoir
- Creates: Lake Aizen
- Total capacity: 14,130,000 m^{3}
- Catchment area: 20.4 km^{2}
- Surface area: 76 ha

Aratozawa Dam (Japanese: 荒砥沢ダム) is a dam in Kurihara, Miyagi Prefecture, Japan, completed in 1998.
