= Kurikoma Dam =

Dam in Miyagi Prefecture, Japan

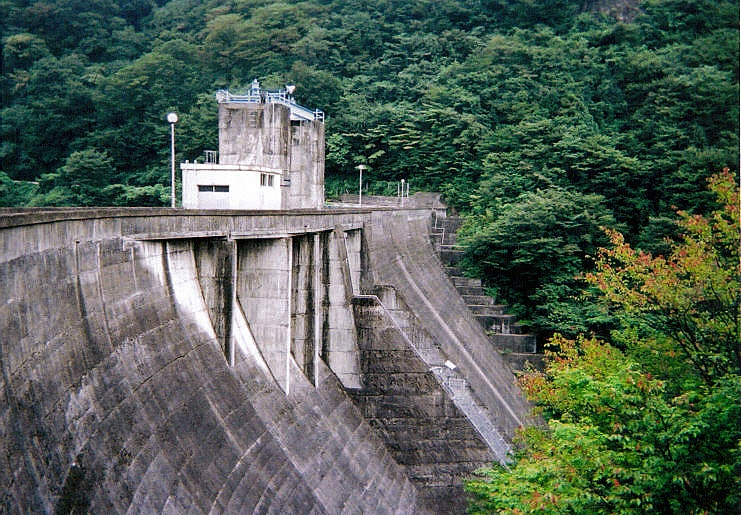

- Location within Miyagi Prefecture Location within Japan
- Location: Kurihara, Miyagi, Japan
- Coordinates: 38°54′27″N 140°55′07″E
- Construction began: 1949
- Opening date: 1962
- Owner: Miyagi Prefecture

Dam and spillways
- Type of dam: Gravity dam
- Height: 57 m (187 ft)
- Length: 182 m (597 ft)

Reservoir
- Total capacity: 13,715,000 m^{3}
- Catchment area: 53 km^{2}
- Surface area: 83 hectares (210 acres)

Power Station
- Annual generation: 2,800 kW

Kurikoma Dam (Japanese: 栗駒ダム) is a multi-purpose gravity dam in the city of Kurihara, Miyagi, Japan, completed in 1962.
