= Naganuma Dam (Miyagi) =

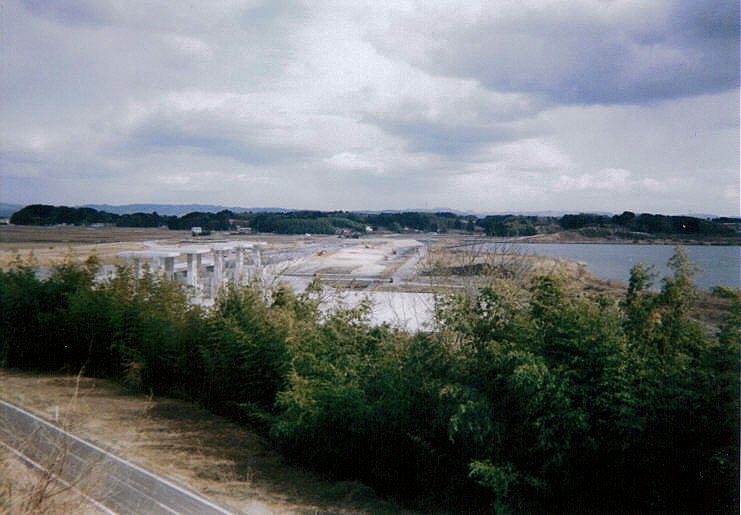
- Naganuma Dam under construction in 2007

- Location within Miyagi Prefecture Location within Japan
- Location: Tome, Miyagi, Japan
- Coordinates: 38°42′34.8″N 141°08′58″E
- Construction began: 1975
- Opening date: 2014
- Owner: Miyagi Prefecture

Dam and spillways
- Type of dam: Earthfill dam
- Impounds: Hasama River
- Height: 15.3 m (50 ft)
- Length: 1,050 m (3,440 ft)

Reservoir
- Total capacity: 31,800,000 m^{3}
- Catchment area: 570 m^{2}
- Surface area: 610 hectares (1,500 acres)

Naganuma Dam (Japanese: 長沼ダム) is a dam in the city of Tome, Miyagi, Japan, completed in May 2014. The dam is located on the Hasama River, a branch of the Kitakami River system.

The dam was built by the government of Miyagi Prefecture. It is an earthen dam, with height of 15.3 meters, and three lock gates on its left bank. The dam utilises the bacon of a pre-existing natural lake, and is unusual in that it is intended to store flood waters from a reverse flow of the Kitakami Rover during typhoons and heavy rains. The dam is intended as a multi-purpose dam, for agricultural water, flood control and for recreational purposes. The dam is one of several planned after the Kitakami River valley suffered from extensive flooding after typhoons in 1947 and 1948. Although preliminary construction began in 1975, completion was considerably delayed due to strenuous opposition by local residents opposed to relocation and due to environmental concerns over the flooding of the natural Lake Naganuma.

Since completion, the dam has been noted as a site for boat racing. In October 1999, the 8th Asian Boat Championship was held at Lake Naganuma; this event also served as the Asian preliminaries for the Sydney Olympics the following year.
