= Naruko Dam =

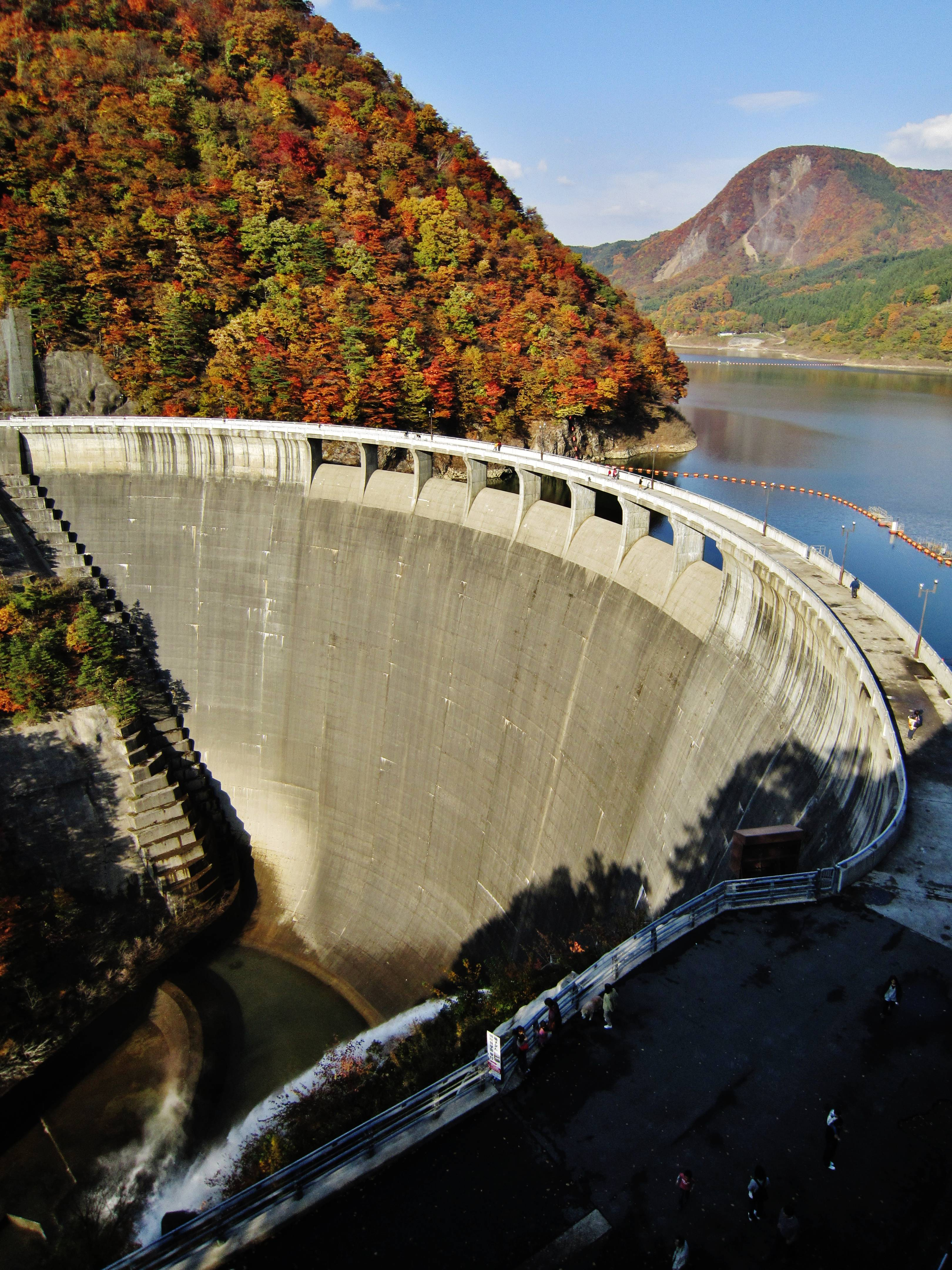
- Naruko Dam

- Location within Miyagi Prefecture Location within Japan
- Official name: 鳴子ダム
- Location: Ōsaki, Miyagi, Japan
- Coordinates: 38°45′16″N 140°42′18″E
- Construction began: 1951
- Opening date: 1958
- Owner: Ministry of Land, Infrastructure, Transport and Tourism

Dam and spillways
- Type of dam: Concrete Gravity Arch Dam
- Impounds: Eaigawa
- Height: 94.5 m (310 ft)
- Length: 215.0 m (705.4 ft)
- Dam volume: 180,000 cubic meters

Reservoir
- Creates: Lake Arao
- Total capacity: 50,000,000 cubic meters
- Catchment area: 210.1 square kilometers
- Surface area: 210.0 hectares (519 acres)

Power Station
- Installed capacity: 18,700 KW

Naruko Dam (Japanese: 鳴子ダム, Naruko Damu) is a concrete gravity-arch dam on the Eaigawa River, a tributary of the Kitakami River system, located in the city of Ōsaki, Miyagi Prefecture, Japan. Completed in 1958 by Kajima Corporation, it is managed by the Tohoku Regional Development Bureau of the Ministry of Land, Infrastructure, Transport and Tourism.

== Overview ==
Naruko Dam is a 94.5-meter high arch-style concrete dam, designed for flood control, hydroelectric power generation, and water supply for the Ōsaki agricultural area. The reservoir created by the dam is called Lake Arao (荒雄湖, Araoko). The dam and lake are part of the Kurikoma Quasi-National Park.

== Historical significance ==
Naruko Dam is notable as the first 100-meter class arch-style concrete dam built entirely by Japanese engineers without foreign assistance, despite the complex caldera terrain. In 2016, it was recognized as a Selected Civil Engineering Heritage site by the Japan Society of Civil Engineers.

== Geography ==
The Eaigawa River, where Naruko Dam is built, is the largest tributary of the Kitakami River system in Miyagi Prefecture. It originates from the northeast of Mount Arawo and flows around it before passing through the dam site. After the dam, it changes course to the southeast, eventually joining the old Kitakami River. The dam is located just upstream of where the Ōtanigawa River joins the Eaigawa, near the famous Naruko Gorge. The nearby Naruko Onsen, one of Tōhoku's renowned hot spring areas, is located just downstream.

== History ==
The Eaigawa River has a long history of flooding the agricultural lands of Miyagi Prefecture. Initial surveys for flood control measures began in 1941 but were interrupted by World War II. After severe flooding caused by Typhoon Kathleen in 1947 and Typhoon Ion in 1948, the Ministry of Construction (now the Ministry of Land, Infrastructure, Transport and Tourism) formulated the "Revised Improvement Plan for the Upper Kitakami River" in 1949.

The Naruko Dam project was initiated as part of the "Eai River and Naruse River Revised Improvement Plan." Construction began in 1951 and was completed in 1958, taking seven years.

== Design and construction ==
Naruko Dam is the third concrete gravity arch dam to be completed in Japan, following the Mimoro Dam on the Hii River and the Kamishiiba Dam on the Mimi River. However, it is the first to be designed and constructed entirely by Japanese engineers. The dam's height is 94.5 meters, and its construction spanned from 1951 to 1958.

== Functions ==
The dam serves multiple purposes:

- Flood control
- Water supply for irrigation
- Hydroelectric power generation by Tohoku Electric Power Company

== Tourism ==
Naruko Dam is a popular tourist destination, especially during the spring and autumn seasons. In spring, visitors can witness the "sudare" (bamboo blind) discharge, where snowmelt water is released from the dam crest, creating a curtain-like effect. This spectacle, combined with carp streamers flown for Children's Day (May 5), creates an illusion of "carp climbing a waterfall."

In autumn, the area around the dam, including Naruko Gorge and Lake Arao, is famous for its vibrant fall foliage, attracting many tourists. The dam is easily accessible from JR Naruko-Onsen Station and is near National Route 108, also known as the Sen-Shū Sun Line.

== See also ==
- List of dams and reservoirs in Japan
- Miyagi Prefecture
- Naruko Onsen
