= Noshiro =

Noshiro 能代市
- City
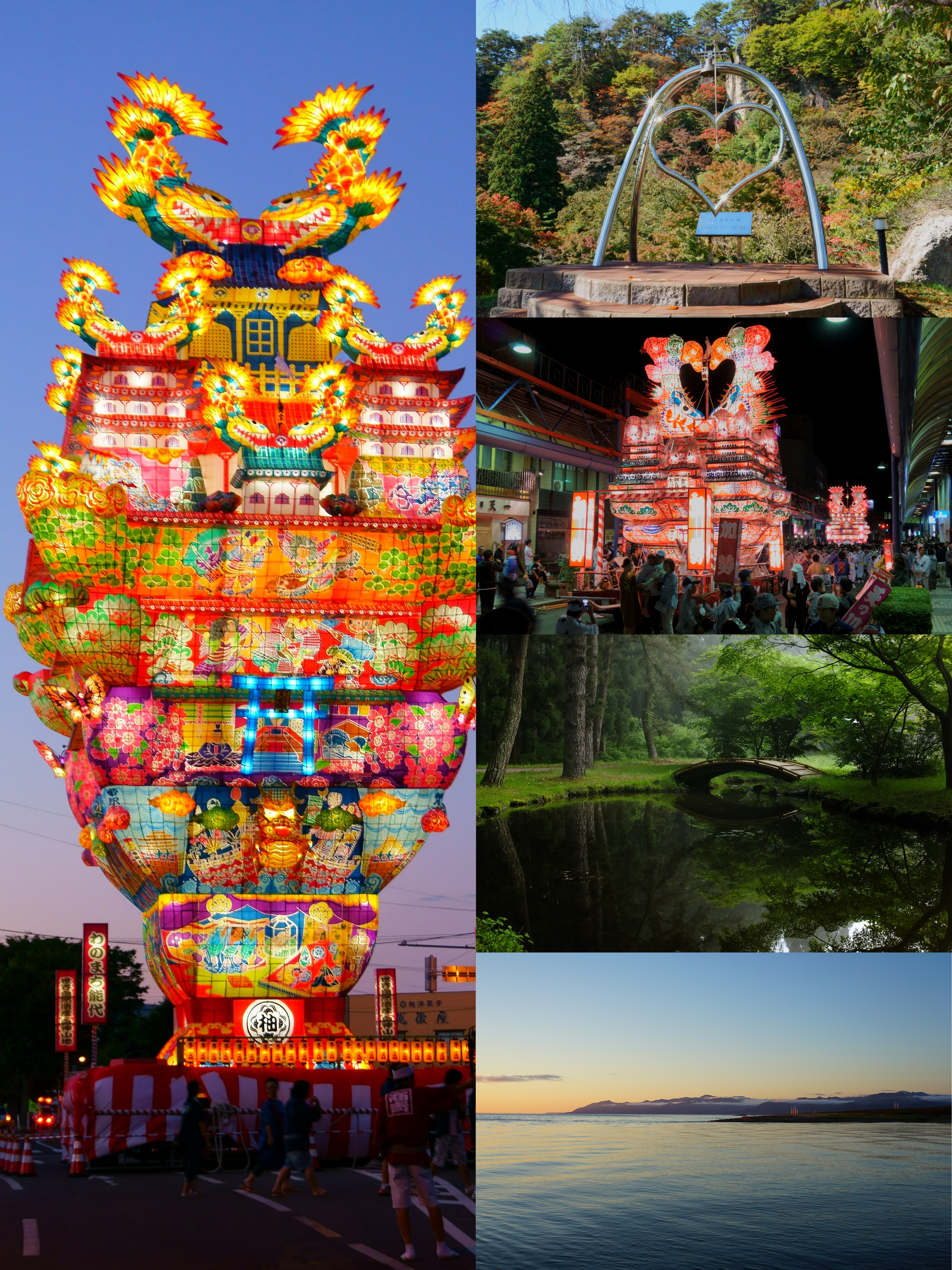
- Left:Chikazue lantern float on Noshiro Tanabata Festiwal on every August, Right:Kimiichi Heartfull Bell, Another float at Noshiro Tanabata Festival, A pond in Window of Matsubara, A sunset view of Mount Range of Shirakami and Yoneshiro River.(above to bottom)

- Flag Seal
- /0/queryThe property query is required; /0/idsThe property ids is required; /0Failed to match at least one schema; /0/titleThe property title is required; /0/serviceDoes not have a value in the enumeration ["page"]; /0Failed to match exactly one schema; /0/geometriesThe property geometries is required; /0/typeDoes not have a value in the enumeration ["GeometryCollection"]; /0/typeDoes not have a value in the enumeration ["MultiPolygon"]; /0/typeDoes not have a value in the enumeration ["Point"]; /0/typeDoes not have a value in the enumeration ["MultiPoint"]; /0/typeDoes not have a value in the enumeration ["LineString"]; /0/typeDoes not have a value in the enumeration ["MultiLineString"]; /0/typeDoes not have a value in the enumeration ["Polygon"]; /0/coordinatesThe property coordinates is required; /0/geometryThe property geometry is required; /0/typeDoes not have a value in the enumeration ["Feature"]; /0/featuresThe property features is required; /0/typeDoes not have a value in the enumeration ["FeatureCollection"]; Location of Noshiro in Akita Prefecture

- Coordinates: 40°12′43.7″N 140°1′35.8″E
- Country: Japan
- Region: Tōhoku
- Prefecture: Akita
- First official recorded: 658 AD (official confirmed)
- Noshiro port town Settled: April 1, 1889
- City Settled: October 1, 1940

Government
  - -Mayor: Akatsuki Nabeya (鍋屋暁) - from April 2026

Area
  - Total: 426.95 km^{2} (164.85 sq mi)

Population (February 28, 2023)
  - Total: 49,150
  - Density: 115.1/km^{2} (298.2/sq mi)
- Time zone: UTC+9 (Japan Standard Time)
- Phone number: 0185-52-2111
- Address: 1-3 Uemachi, Noshiro-shi, Akita-ken 016-8501
- Climate: Cfa
- Website: Official website
- Symbols
- Bird: Green Pheasant
- Flower: Sakura
- Tree: Japanese black pine, Cryptomeria

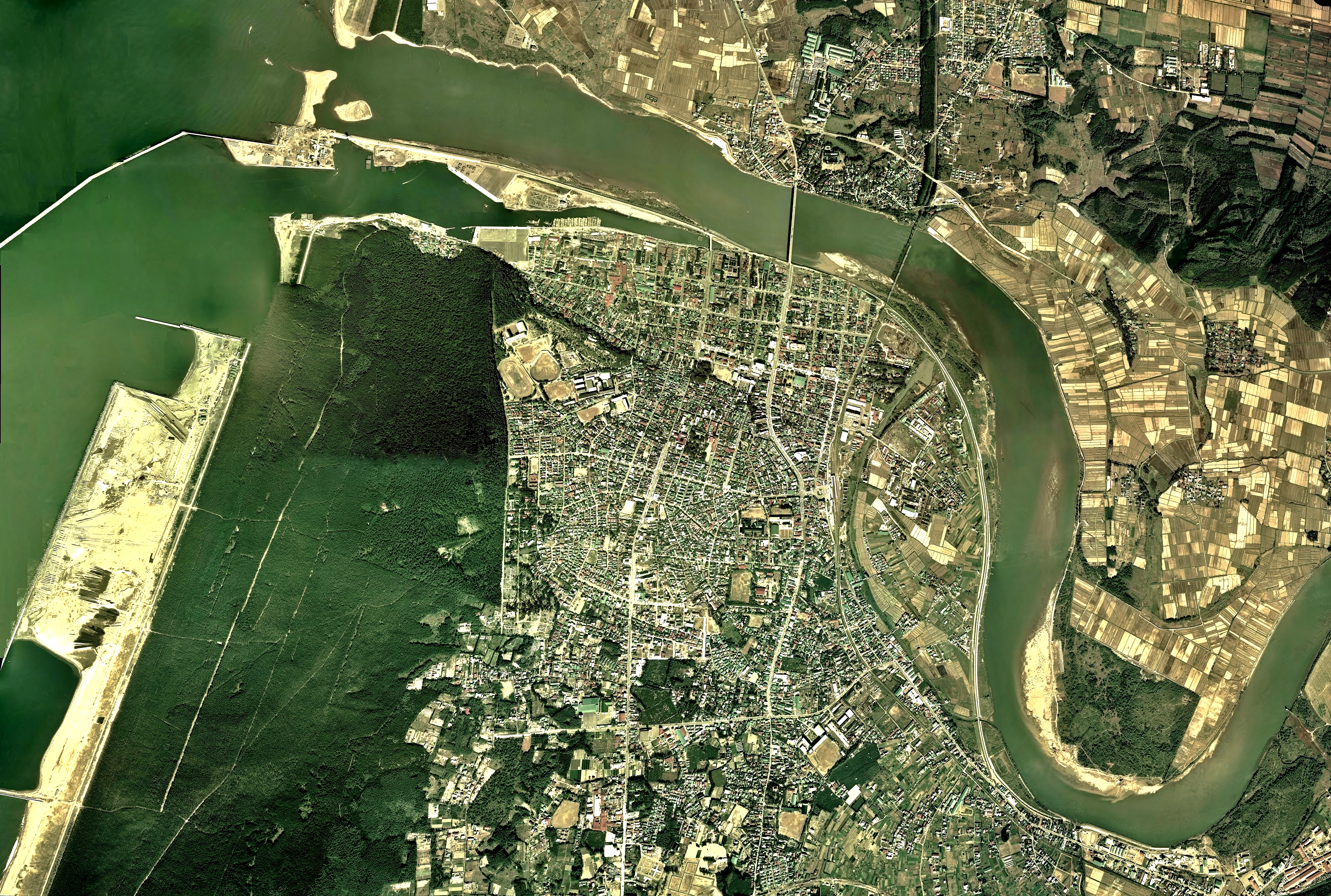
Aerial photo of Noshiro city center

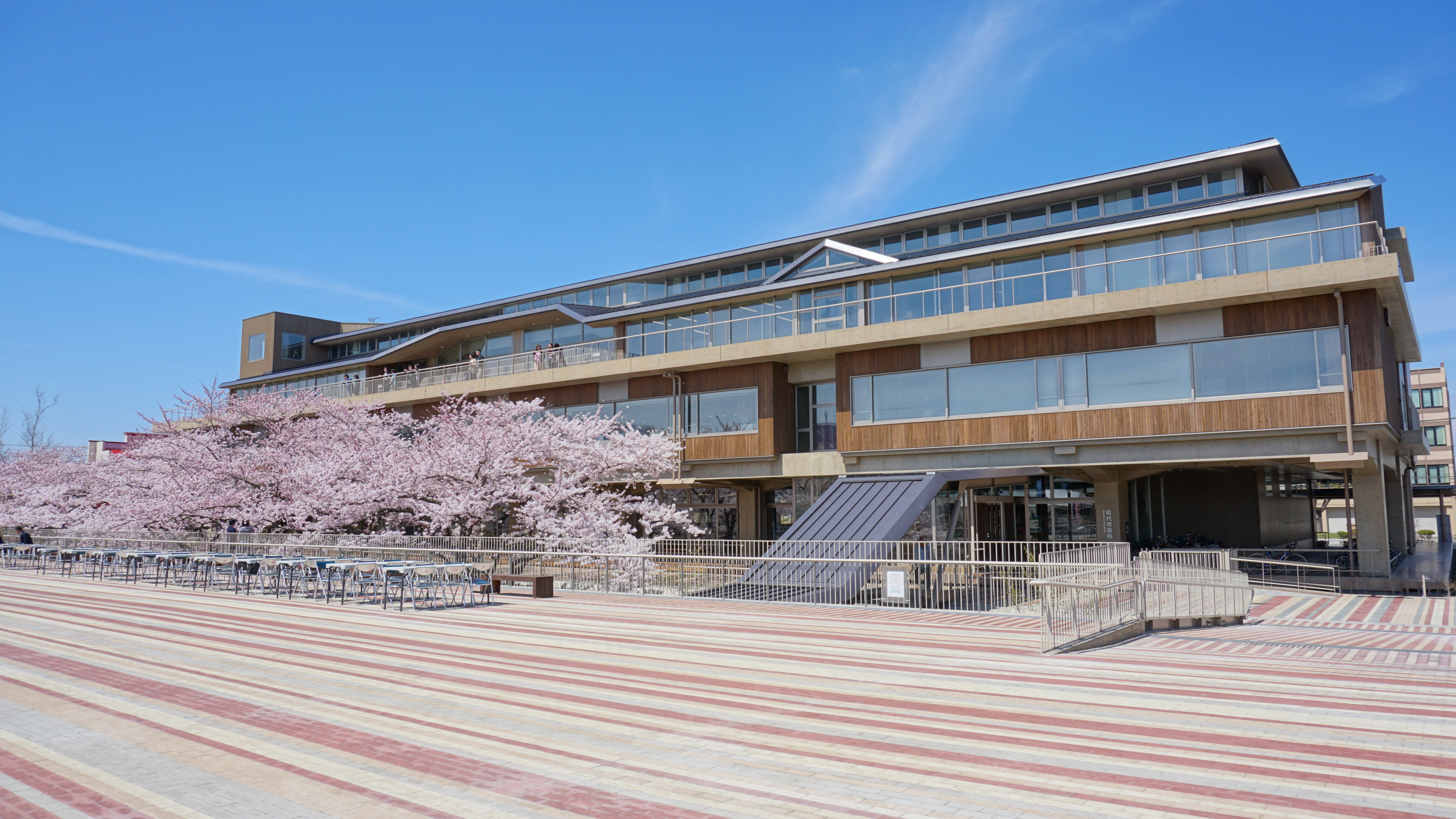
Noshiro City Hall

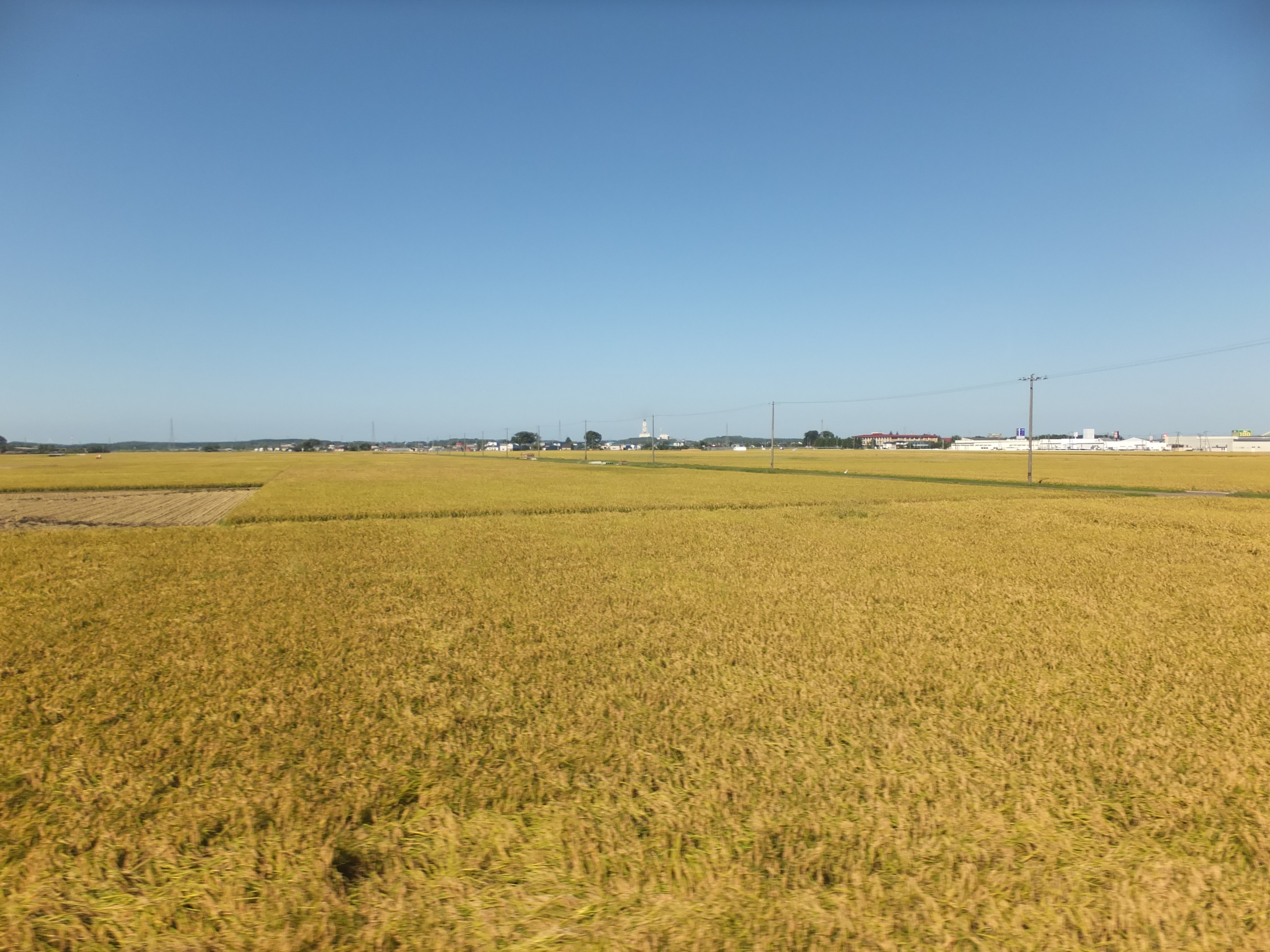
Rice fields in the Noshiro Plain

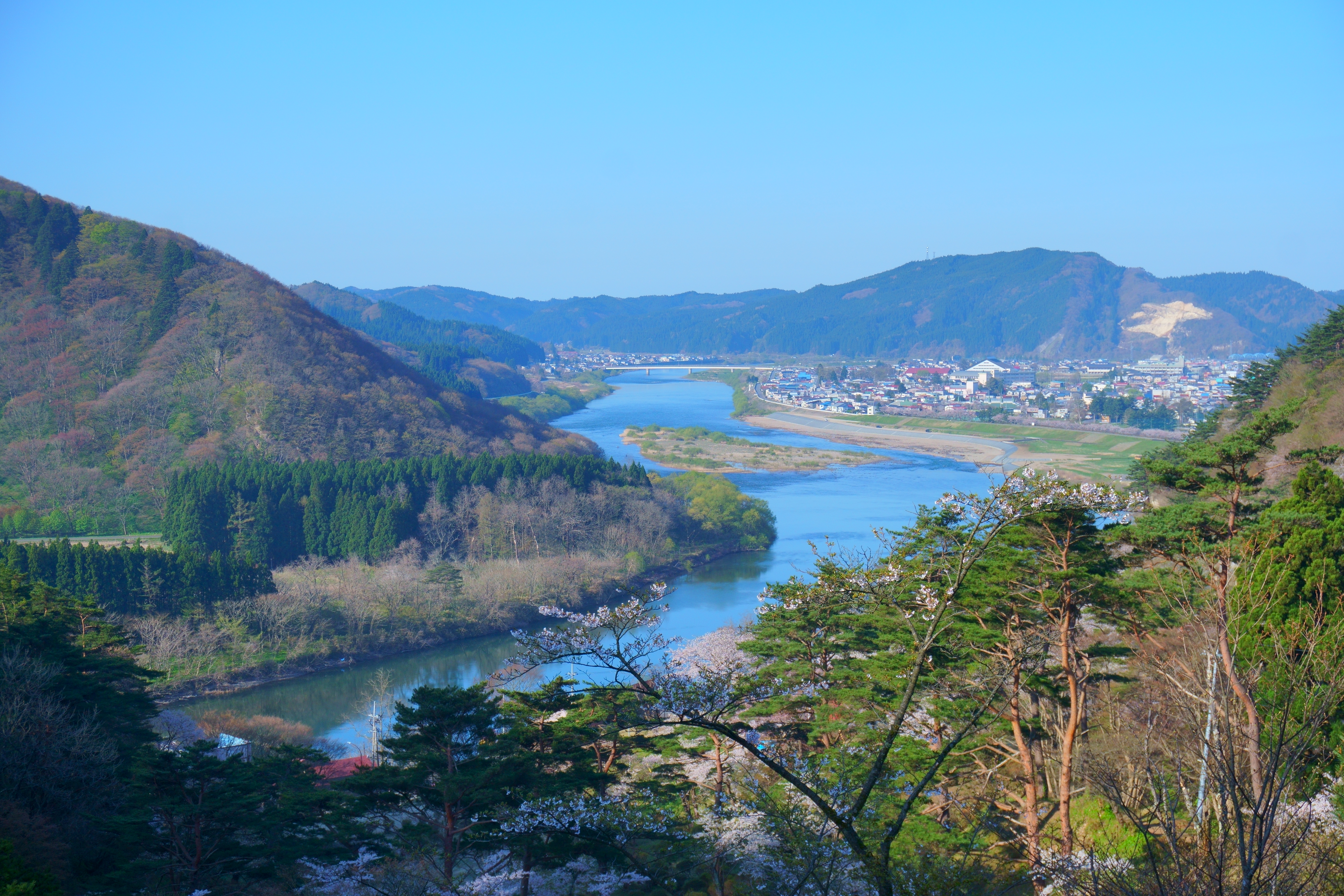
Yoneshiro River

Noshiro (能代市, Noshiro-shi) is a city located in Akita Prefecture, Japan. As of 28 February 2023, the city had an estimated population of 49,150 in 24,079 households, and a population density of 120 persons per km^{2}. The total area of the city is 426.95 square kilometres (164.85 sq mi).

== Geography ==
Noshiro is located in the flat coastal plains northwestern Akita Prefecture, bordered by the Sea of Japan to the west, but there are hills near the border with Mitane and along the coast. Much of the eastern part of the city is mountainous. The Yoneshiro River flows through the city and empties into the Sea of Japan near Noshiro Port. The highest point is Mount Yakeyama at 963.1 metres (3,160 ft).

=== Neighboring municipalities ===
Akita Prefecture

- Fujisato
- Happō
- Kamikoani
- Kitaakita
- Mitane

=== Climate ===
Noshiro has a humid subtropical climate (Köppen climate classification Cfa) with large seasonal temperature differences, with warm to hot (and often humid) summers and cold (sometimes severely cold) winters. Precipitation is significant throughout the year, but is heaviest from August to October. The average annual temperature in Noshiro is 11.5 °C (52.7 °F). The average annual rainfall is 1,494.4 mm (58.83 in) with July as the wettest month. The temperatures are highest on average in August, at around 24.3 °C (75.7 °F), and lowest in January, at around 0.2 °C (32.4 °F).

Climate data for Noshiro (elevation 6 m, 1991–2020 normals, extremes 1976–present)
Month	Jan	Feb	Mar	Apr	May	Jun	Jul	Aug	Sep	Oct	Nov	Dec	Year
Record high °C (°F)	11.6 (52.9)	19.2 (66.6)	23.9 (75.0)	27.1 (80.8)	30.7 (87.3)	33.1 (91.6)	36.8 (98.2)	39.1 (102.4)	37.7 (99.9)	28.8 (83.8)	23.5 (74.3)	16.4 (61.5)	39.1 (102.4)
Mean daily maximum °C (°F)	2.9 (37.2)	3.7 (38.7)	7.5 (45.5)	13.6 (56.5)	19.1 (66.4)	23.2 (73.8)	26.7 (80.1)	28.7 (83.7)	24.9 (76.8)	18.5 (65.3)	11.9 (53.4)	5.7 (42.3)	15.5 (59.9)
Daily mean °C (°F)	0.2 (32.4)	0.6 (33.1)	3.6 (38.5)	9.0 (48.2)	14.5 (58.1)	18.9 (66.0)	22.8 (73.0)	24.3 (75.7)	20.3 (68.5)	13.9 (57.0)	7.9 (46.2)	2.6 (36.7)	11.5 (52.7)
Mean daily minimum °C (°F)	−2.5 (27.5)	−2.4 (27.7)	0.0 (32.0)	4.4 (39.9)	10.3 (50.5)	15.2 (59.4)	19.6 (67.3)	20.6 (69.1)	16.1 (61.0)	9.7 (49.5)	4.1 (39.4)	−0.3 (31.5)	7.9 (46.2)
Record low °C (°F)	−12.4 (9.7)	−12.4 (9.7)	−10.5 (13.1)	−4.5 (23.9)	0.0 (32.0)	5.8 (42.4)	11.5 (52.7)	12.4 (54.3)	6.1 (43.0)	1.4 (34.5)	−4.1 (24.6)	−8.8 (16.2)	−12.4 (9.7)
Average precipitation mm (inches)	114.8 (4.52)	86.0 (3.39)	79.5 (3.13)	86.3 (3.40)	105.5 (4.15)	100.2 (3.94)	162.5 (6.40)	155.9 (6.14)	154.6 (6.09)	147.7 (5.81)	157.5 (6.20)	143.9 (5.67)	1,494.4 (58.83)
Average snowfall cm (inches)	129 (51)	106 (42)	30 (12)	1 (0.4)	0 (0)	0 (0)	0 (0)	0 (0)	0 (0)	0 (0)	5 (2.0)	66 (26)	337 (133)
Average precipitation days (≥ 1.0 mm)	20.8	17.8	14.7	11.1	10.7	9.7	11.2	10.3	11.6	14.1	17.4	21.6	171.0
Mean monthly sunshine hours	32.9	60.6	128.7	185.0	191.4	184.4	157.9	194.7	168.9	145.2	82.7	41.6	1,572.5
Source: Japan Meteorological Agency (1991–2020 normals, extremes 1976–present)

== Demographics ==
Per Japanese census data, the population of Noshiro has been declining over the past 60 years.

Historical population
Year	Pop.	±%
1960	82,722	—
1970	77,011	−6.9%
1980	76,028	−1.3%
1990	69,516	−8.6%
2000	65,237	−6.2%
2010	59,084	−9.4%
2020	49,968	−15.4%

== History ==
Per the Nihon Shoki and other ancient chronicles, Noshiro is the location where an expedition sent by the imperial court led by Abe no Hirafu landed in 658 AD with orders to force the local Emishi tribes into submission. Trade vessels from Balhae were calling at Noshiro Port as late as 771 AD. The area of present-day Noshiro was part of ancient Dewa Province, dominated by the Satake clan during the Edo period, who ruled Kubota Domain under the Tokugawa shogunate. The town of Nishirominato was established on April 1, 1889 with the establishment of the modern municipalities system.

The city of Noshiro was created by the merger of the town of Noshirominato and the villages of Shinonome and Sakaki (all formerly from Yamamoto District) on October 1, 1940.

On March 21, 2006, the town of Futatsui (from Yamamoto District) was merged into Noshiro.

== Government ==
Noshiro has a mayor-council form of government with a directly elected mayor and a unicameral city legislature of 20 members. The city (together with the towns of Yamamoto District) contributes four members to the Akita Prefectural Assembly. In terms of national politics, the city is part of Akita 2nd district of the lower house of the Diet of Japan.

== Economy ==
The economy of Noshiro is based on agriculture and commercial fishing. Tohoku Electric operates the Noshiro Thermal Power Station, a coal / biomass power plant in the city.

== Education ==
Noshiro has seven public elementary schools and six public junior high schools operated by the city government, and four public high schools operated by the Akita Prefectural Board of Education. The prefecture also operates one special education school for the handicapped.

- Noshiro Technical High School

== Transportation ==
=== Airport ===
- Odate-Noshiro Airport - opened in 1998

=== Railway ===
East Japan Railway Company - Ōu Main Line

- Higashi-Noshiro - Tsurugata - Tomine - Futatsui

East Japan Railway Company - Gonō Line

- Higashi-Noshiro - Noshiro - Mukai-Noshiro - Kita-Noshiro - Torigata

=== Highway ===
- Akita Expressway
- National Route 7
- National Route 101

=== Seaports ===
- Port of Noshiro

== Sister cities ==
- Wrangell, Alaska, United States, since December 16, 1960

== Local attractions ==
- Kaze no Matsubara - one of the 100 Soundscapes of Japan by the Japanese Ministry of the Environment
- Noshiro Onsen
- Noshiro Swimming Beach

=== Festivals ===
- Noshiro Port Fireworks Festival in 2008 had 150,000 visitors.
- Noshiro Yakutanabata
- Onagori Festival in Noshiro Kanto matsuri, Aomori Nebuta Matsuri, Samba Carnival and more. In 2008, 250,000 people visited.
- Tenku no Fuyajo

== Notable people from Noshiro ==
- Masumi Asano, voice actress
- Ando Chikasue, Daimyo
- Hosei Norota, politician
- Shuji Ono, Basketball head coach
- Takashi Ono, Olympic gymnast
- Sadatoshi Sugawara, Olympic volleyball player
- Nanako Takeda, professional football player
- Hisashi Yamada, professional baseball player
