= Tomine Station =

Railway station in Noshiro, Akita Prefecture, Japan

Tomine Station 富根駅
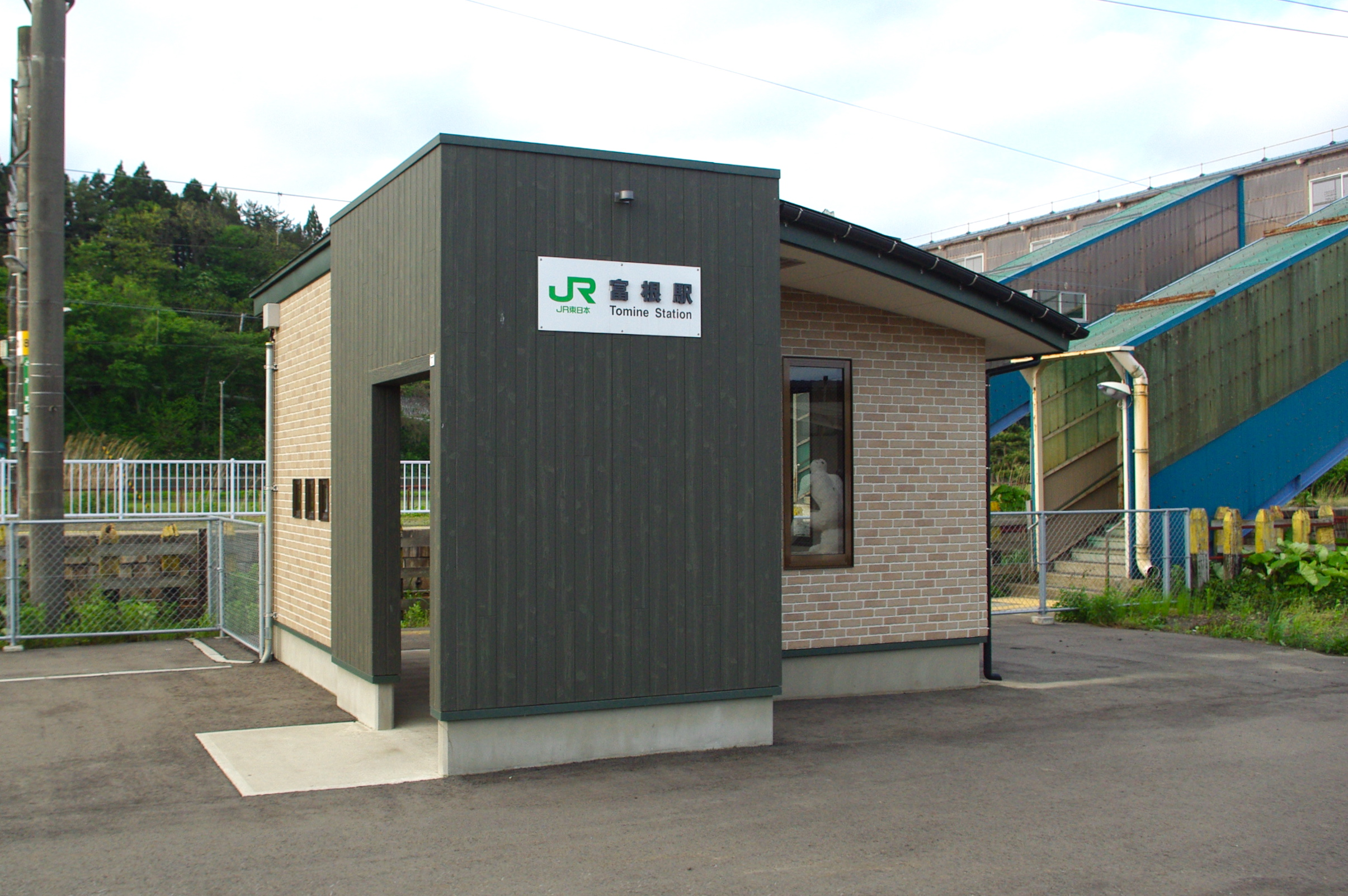
- Tomine Station (May 31, 2011)

General information
- Location: 9 Machigashira, Futatsuimachi-Tobune, Noshiro-shi, Akita-ken; Japan
- Coordinates: 40°13′4.60″N 140°10′21.25″E
- Operator: JR East
- Line: ■ Ōu Main Line
- Distance: 365.5 kilometers from Fukushima
- Platforms: 2 side platforms

Other information
- Status: Unstaffed
- Website: Official website

History
- Opened: January 25, 1907

Passengers
- FY2015: 97

Services
Preceding station	JR East	Following station
Tsurugata towards Shinjō	Ōu Main Line Local	Futatsui towards Aomori
Location
- Location within Akita Prefecture Location within Japan

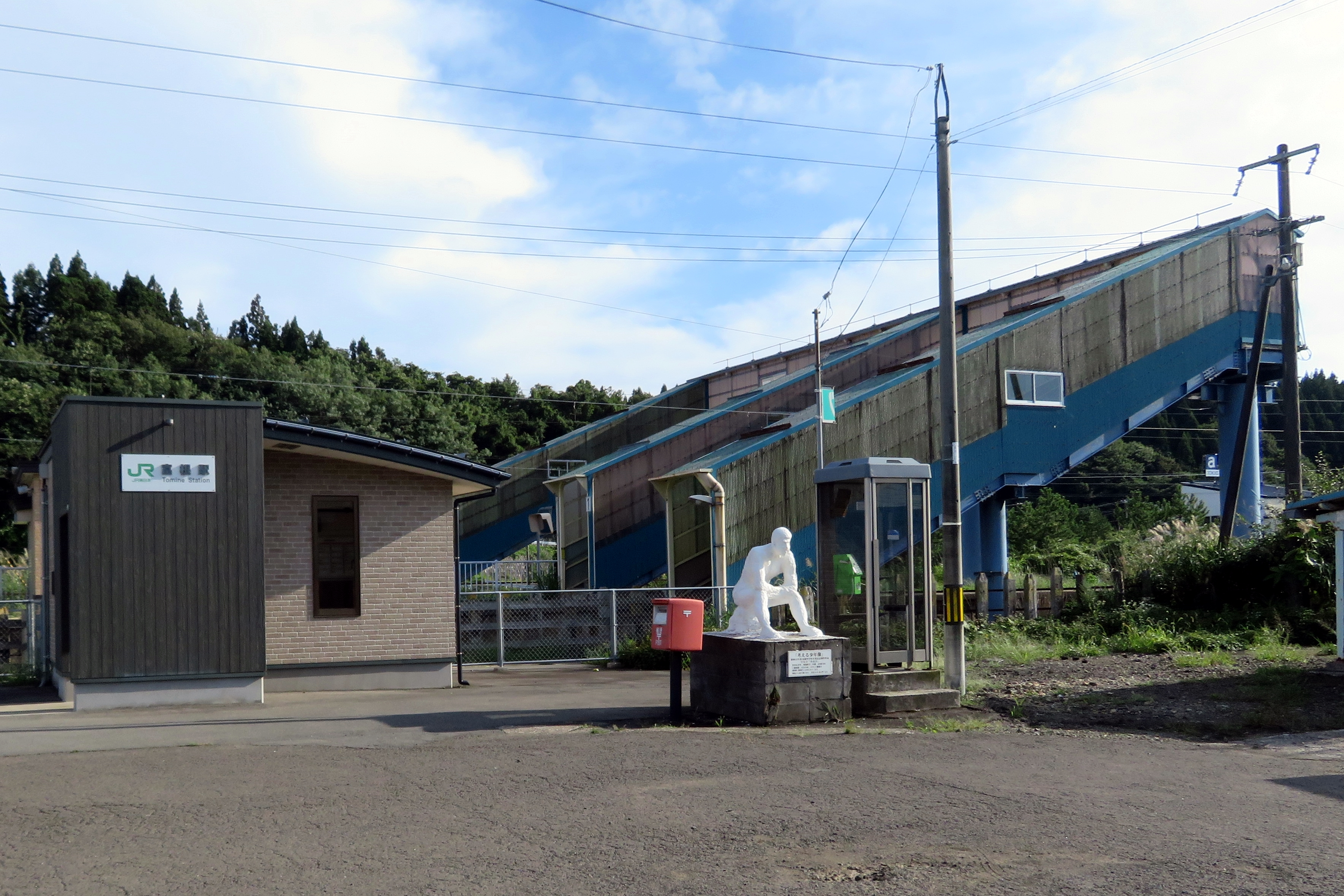
Side view

Tomine Station (富根駅, Tomine-eki) is a railway station located in the city of Noshiro, Akita Prefecture, Japan, operated by the East Japan Railway Company (JR East).

== Lines ==
Tomine Station is served by the Ōu Main Line, and is located 365.5 km from the terminus of the line at Fukushima Station.

== Station layout ==
The station consists of two opposed side platforms connected to the station building by a footbridge. The station is unattended.

=== Platforms ===
1	■ Ōu Main Line	for Ōdate and Hirosaki
2	■ Ōu Main Line	for Higashi-Noshiro and Akita

== History ==
Tomine Station was opened on January 25, 1907, as a station on the Japanese Government Railways (JGR), serving the village of Futatsui, Akita. The JGR became the Japan National Railways (JNR) after World War II. The station has been unattended since October 1971. The station was absorbed into the JR East network upon the privatization of the JNR on April 1, 1987.

== Passenger statistics ==
In fiscal 2015, the station was used by an average of 97 passengers daily (boarding passengers only).

== Surrounding area ==
- Tomine Post office
