= Maeyama Station =

Railway station in Kitaakita, Akita Prefecture, Japan

Maeyama Station 前山駅
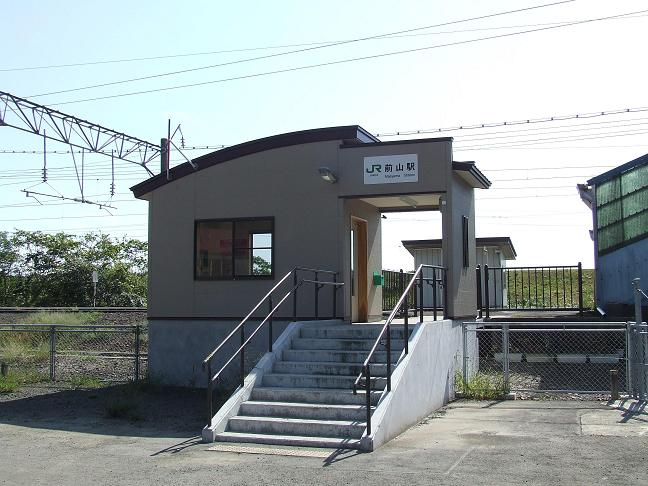
- Maeyama Station (Sep 27, 2009)

General information
- Location: 64 Tsunamae Maeyama, Kitaakita-shi, Akita-ken; Japan
- Coordinates: 40°12′53.05″N 140°18′44.56″E
- Operator: JR East
- Line: ■ Ōu Main Line
- Distance: 379.5 kilometers from Fukushima
- Platforms: 2 side platforms

Other information
- Status: Unstaffed
- Website: Official website

History
- Opened: March 1, 1951

Services
Preceding station	JR East	Following station
Futatsui towards Shinjō	Ōu Main Line Local	Takanosu towards Aomori
Location
- Location within Akita Prefecture Location within Japan

Maeyama Station (前山駅, Maeyama-eki) is a JR East railway station located in the city of Kitaakita, Akita Prefecture, Japan.

== Lines ==
Maeyama Station is served by the Ōu Main Line, and is located 379.5 km from the terminus of the line at Fukushima Station.

== Station layout ==
The station consists of a two opposed side platforms serving two tracks, connected to the station building by a footbridge. The station is unattended.

=== Platforms ===
1	■ Ōu Main Line	for Ōdate and Hirosaki
2	■ Ōu Main Line	for Higashi-Noshiro and Akita

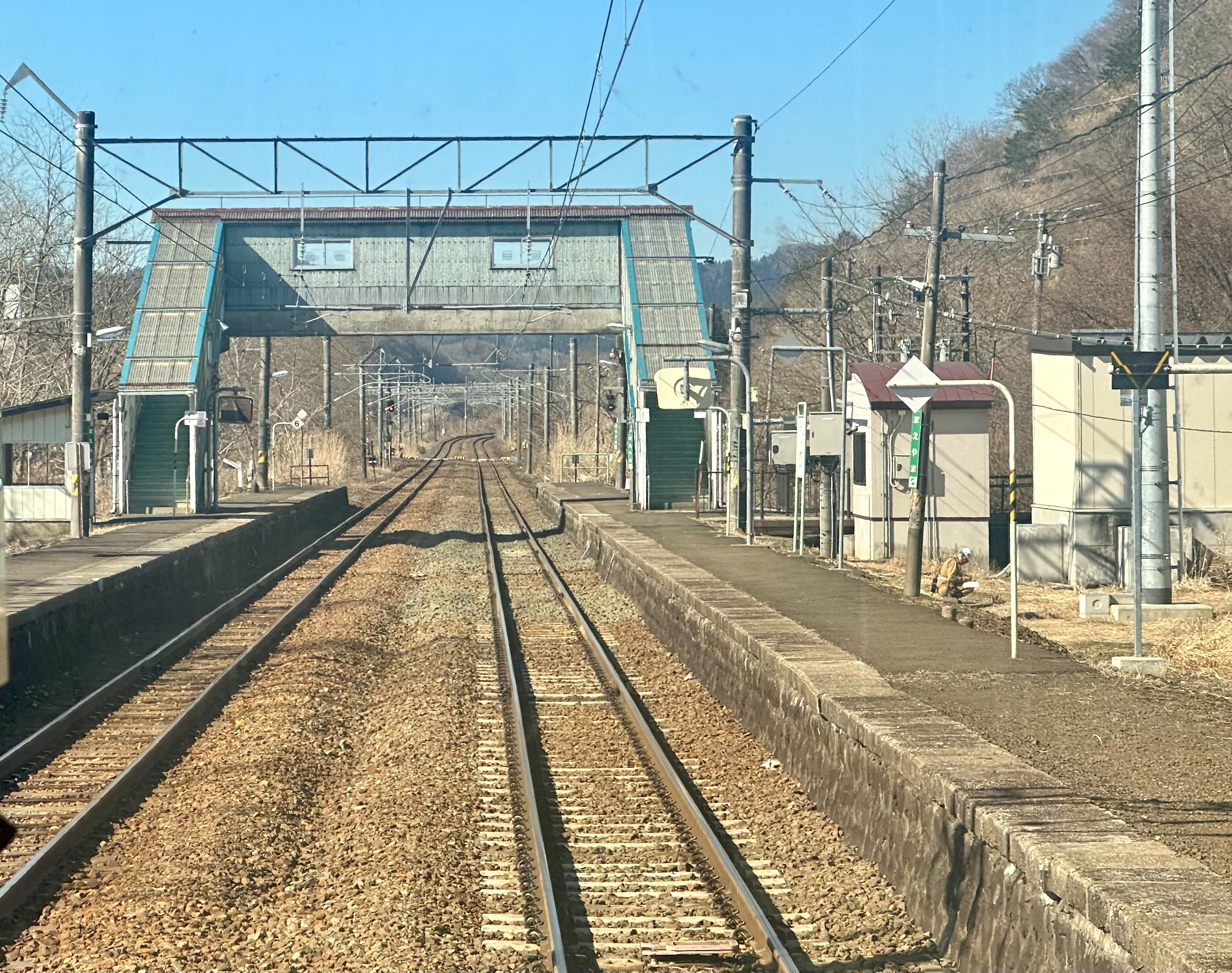
The platforms, 2024

== History ==
Maeyama Station began as Maeyama Signal (前山信号場) on August 27, 1929. It was elevated to a full station on March 1, 1951 on the Japan National Railways (JNR) serving the village of Nanakura, Akita. The station was absorbed into the JR East network upon the privatization of the JNR on April 1, 1987.

== Surrounding area ==
- National Route 7
- Yoneshiro River
