= Port of Noshiro =

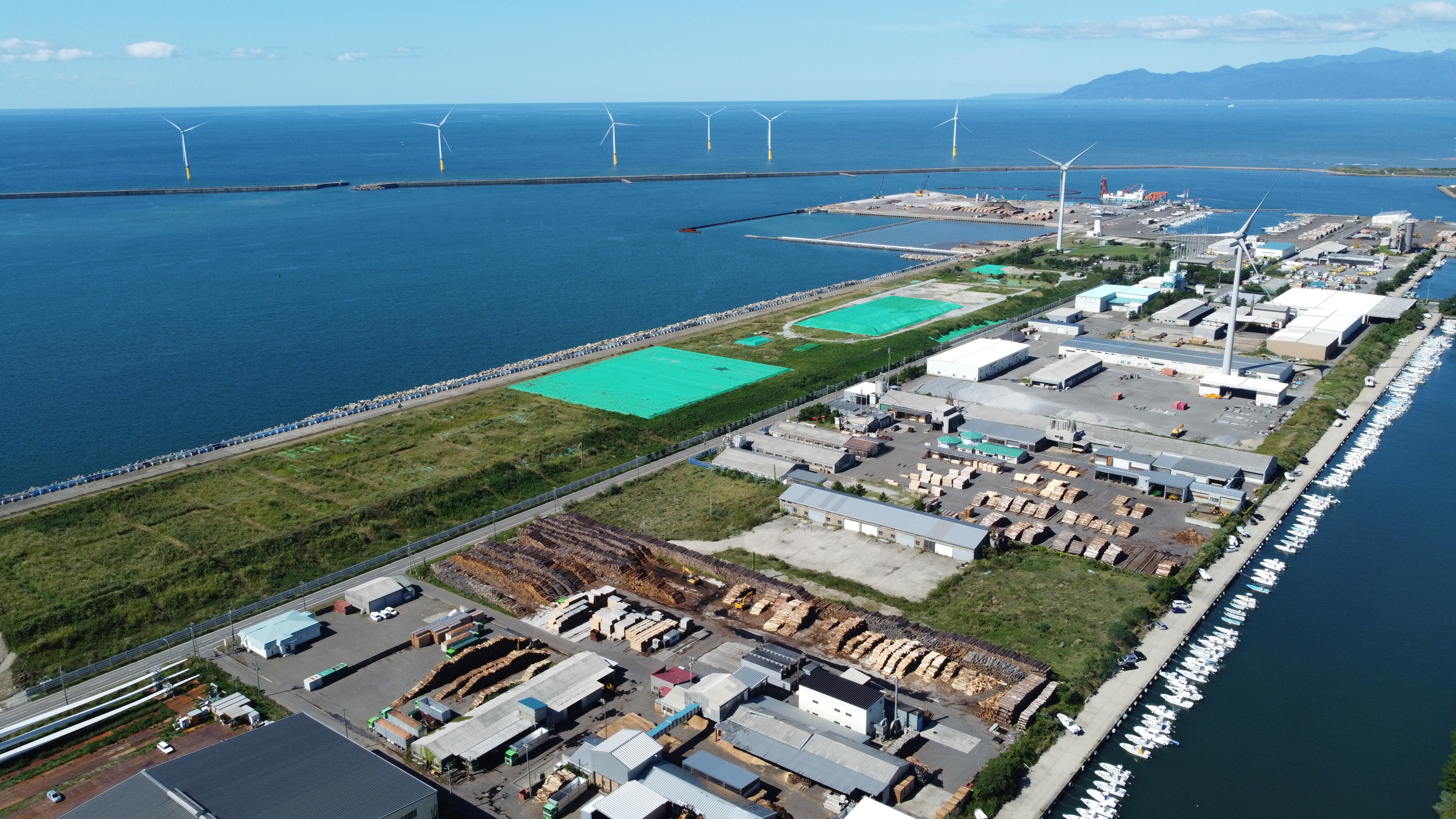
- Interactive map of Port of Noshiro

Location
- Country: Japan
- Location: Noshiro, Akita
- Coordinates: 40°12′58.94″N 139°59′59.83″E

Details
- Opened: 1964
- Operated by: Akita Prefecture
- Type of Harbor: Seaport
- Land area: 276 hectares
- No. of berths: 6

The Port of Noshiro (能代港, Noshiro-kō) is a seaport on the Sea of Japan coast of Akita Prefecture, in the city of Noshiro in the Tōhoku region of northern Honshū, Japan. It is classified as a Major Port (重要港湾, Jūyō-kōwan) by the Japanese government. The port has a total land area of 276 hectares.

== History ==
Per the Nihon Shoki and other ancient chronicles, Noshiro is the location where an expedition sent by the imperial court led by Abe no Hirafu landed in 658 AD with orders to force the local Emishi tribes into submission. Trade vessels from Balhae were calling at Noshiro Port as late as 771 AD. During the Edo period, Noshiro port was an important port of call on the Kitamaebune route of coastal trade from Osaka to Hokkaido and an important source of revenue for the Satake clan’s Kubota Domain based at nearby Akita, who exported lumber from the clans holdings in Dewa Province.

In modern times, the port declined in importance after the Meiji period as silting made the port unusable for larger vessels, despite its status as a “designated port” from 1922 by the Japanese government. After World War II, the port was improved, gaining status as an international trade port in 1972 with the establishment of a customs office, and designation as a Major Port in 1981. The Noshiro Thermal Power Plant was constructed in 1993, powered by coal imported into the port.

The port facilities were upgraded in 2001 with the completion of a multi-purpose international terminal and the port was designated an official “recycling port” in 2006 for the export of scrap metal. Coal imports can take up a large percentage of the cargo handling capacity of the port at present.

== Berths ==
- Omori 13 meter quay (40,000 tons)
- Unnamed quay (15,000 tons)
- Nakajima No. 1 quay (5,000 tons)
- Nakajima No. 2 quay (5,000 tons)
- Noshiro Thermal Power Plant 60,000 ton pier (60,000 tons)
- Noshiro Thermal Power Plant 5,000-ton pier (5,000 tons)

== Events ==
- Noshiro Port Fireworks Display
