= Noshiro Thermal Power Station =

Thermal power station in Noshiro, Akita, Japan

Noshiro Thermal Power Station 能代火力発電所
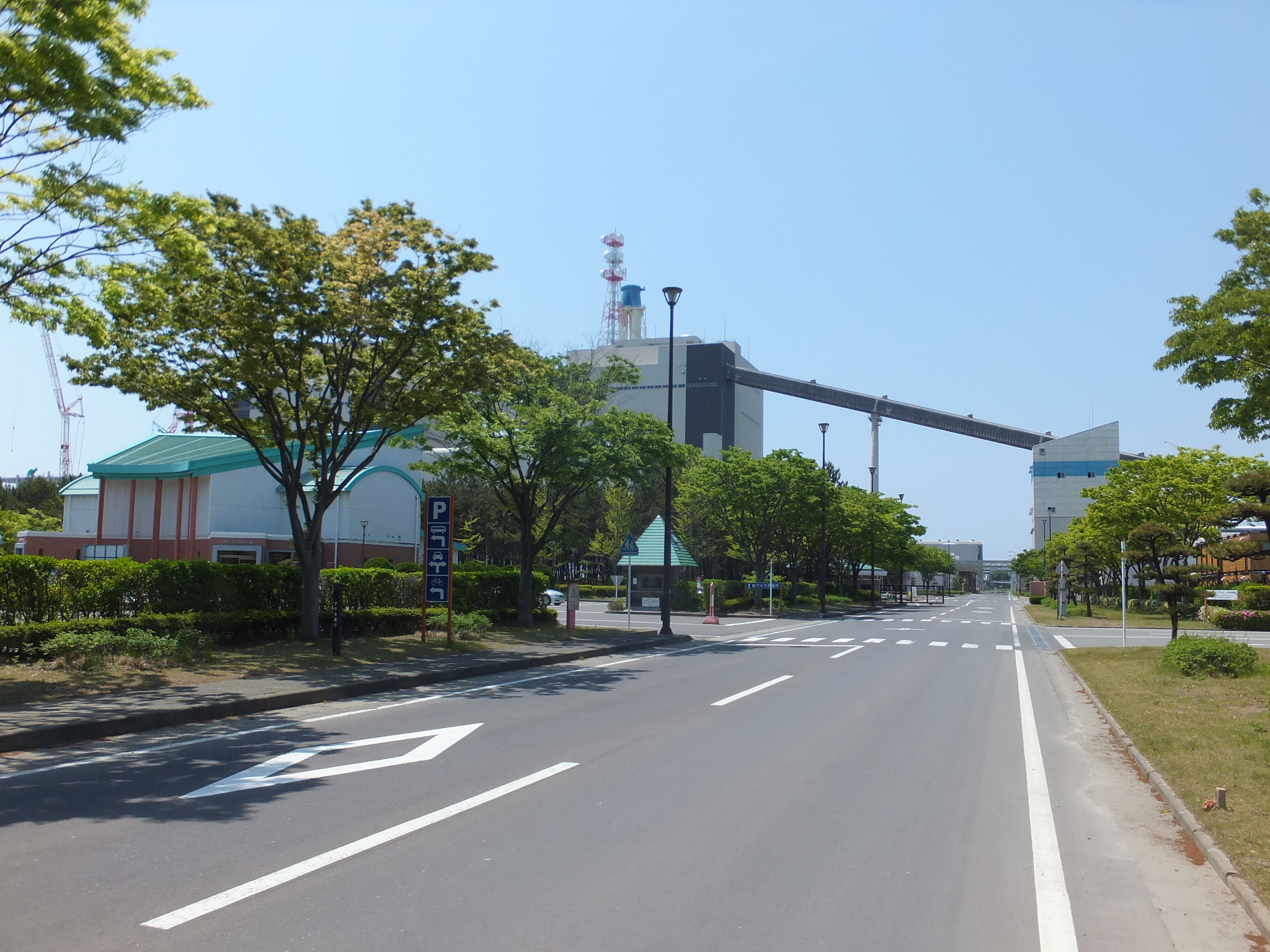
- Noshiro Thermal Power Station
- Country: Japan Akita Prefecture#Japan
- Location: Noshiro, Akita
- Coordinates: 40°11′29″N 139°59′37″E
- Status: Operational
- Commission date: 1993
- Owner: Tohoku Electric
- Operator: Tohoku Electric Power

Thermal power station
- Primary fuel: LNG

Power generation
- Units operational: 2
- Units under const.: 1
- Nameplate capacity: 1200 MW

External links
- Commons: Related media on Commons

Noshiro Thermal Power Station (能代火力発電所, Noshiro Karyoku Hatsudensho) is a coal-fired thermal power station operated by Tohoku Electric in the city of Noshiro, Akita, Japan. The facility is located on the Sea of Japan coast of Honshu.

== History ==
The Noshiro Thermal Power Station was initially conceived as a countermeasure against possible shortages in power generation which might arise due to issues such as the 1973 oil crisis. Unit 1 began operations in May 1993. Due to issues with carbon emissions, Unit 2 was completed in December 1994 to burn a mixture of heavy oil and biomass (wood chip residue). Also to improve power generation efficiency, Unit 2 adopted Tohoku Electric's first ultra-supercritical boiler and steam turbine with a main steam temperature of 566 °C, a reheat steam temperature of 593 °C, and a main steam pressure of 24.1 MPa.

The completion of Unit 3 was delayed due to uncertainty in future power demand and economic trends, as well as increased pressure on Japan from overseas to reduce carbon dioxide emissions. However, following the Tōhoku earthquake and tsunami in March 2011, work was restarted in February 2016 with an estimated completion date by the end of March 2020.

== Generating units ==
=== Operational ===
| Unit | Fuel | Type | Capacity | On line | Status |
| 1 | Coal / Biomass | Super-critical steam turbine | 600 MW | 1993 | operational |
| 2 | Coal / Biomass | Ultra Super-critical steam turbine | 600 MW | 1994 | operational |
| 3 | Coal / Biomass | Ultra Super-critical steam turbine | 600 MW | 2020 | under construction |

== See also ==
- Energy in Japan
- List of power stations in Japan
