= Tsurugata Station =

Railway station in Noshiro, Akita Prefecture, Japan

Tsurugata Station 鶴形駅
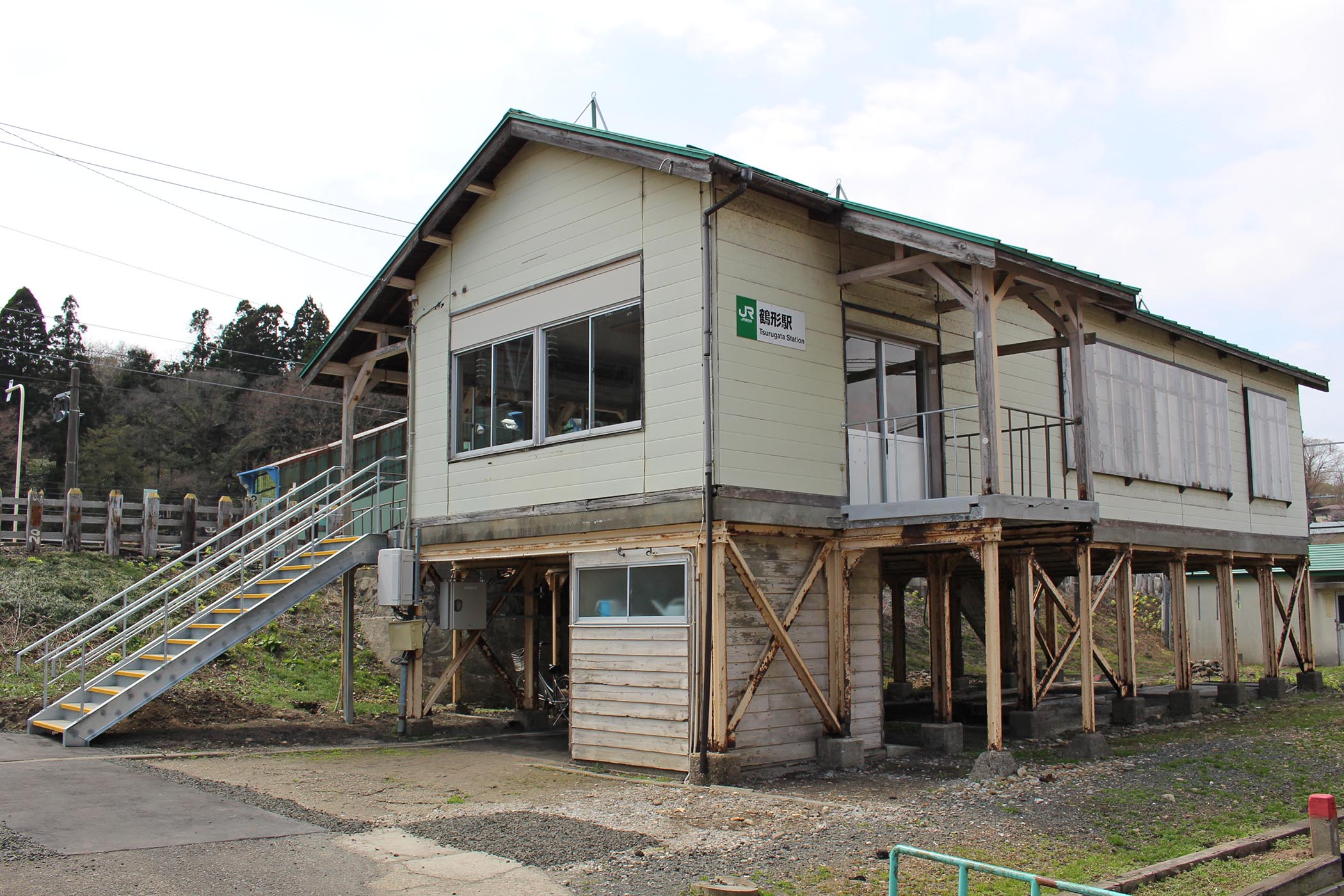
- Tsurugata Station (April 2017)

General information
- Location: 9 Tokusazawa, Tsurugata, Noshiro-shi, Akita-ken; Japan
- Coordinates: 40°12′14″N 140°07′07″E
- Operator: JR East
- Line: ■ Ōu Main Line
- Distance: 360.3 kilometers from Fukushima
- Platforms: 2 side platforms

Other information
- Status: Unstaffed
- Website: Official website

History
- Opened: March 1, 1951

Services
| Preceding station | JR East | Following station |
|---|---|---|
| Higashi-Noshiro towards Shinjō | Ōu Main Line Local | Tomine towards Aomori |
Location
- Location within Akita Prefecture Location within Japan

Tsurugata Station (鶴形駅, Tsurugata-eki) is a JR East railway station located in the city of Noshiro, Akita Prefecture, Japan.

== Lines ==
Tsurugata Station is served by the Ōu Main Line, and is located 360.3 km from the terminus of the line at Fukushima Station.

== Station layout ==
The station consists of a two opposed side platforms serving two tracks, connected to the station building by a footbridge. The station is unattended.

=== Platforms ===
| 1 | ■ Ōu Main Line | for Ōdate and Hirosaki |
| 2 | ■ Ōu Main Line | for Higashi-Noshiro and Akita |

== History ==
Tsurugata Station was opened on January 25, 1952 as a station on the Japan National Railway (JNR), serving the village of Tsurugata, Akita. The station was absorbed into the JR East network upon the privatization of the JNR on April 1, 1987.

== Surrounding area ==
- Tsurugata Elementary School
- Tsurugata Post office
