= Mukai-Noshiro Station =

Railway station in Noshiro, Akita Prefecture, Japan

Mukai-Noshiro Station 向能代駅
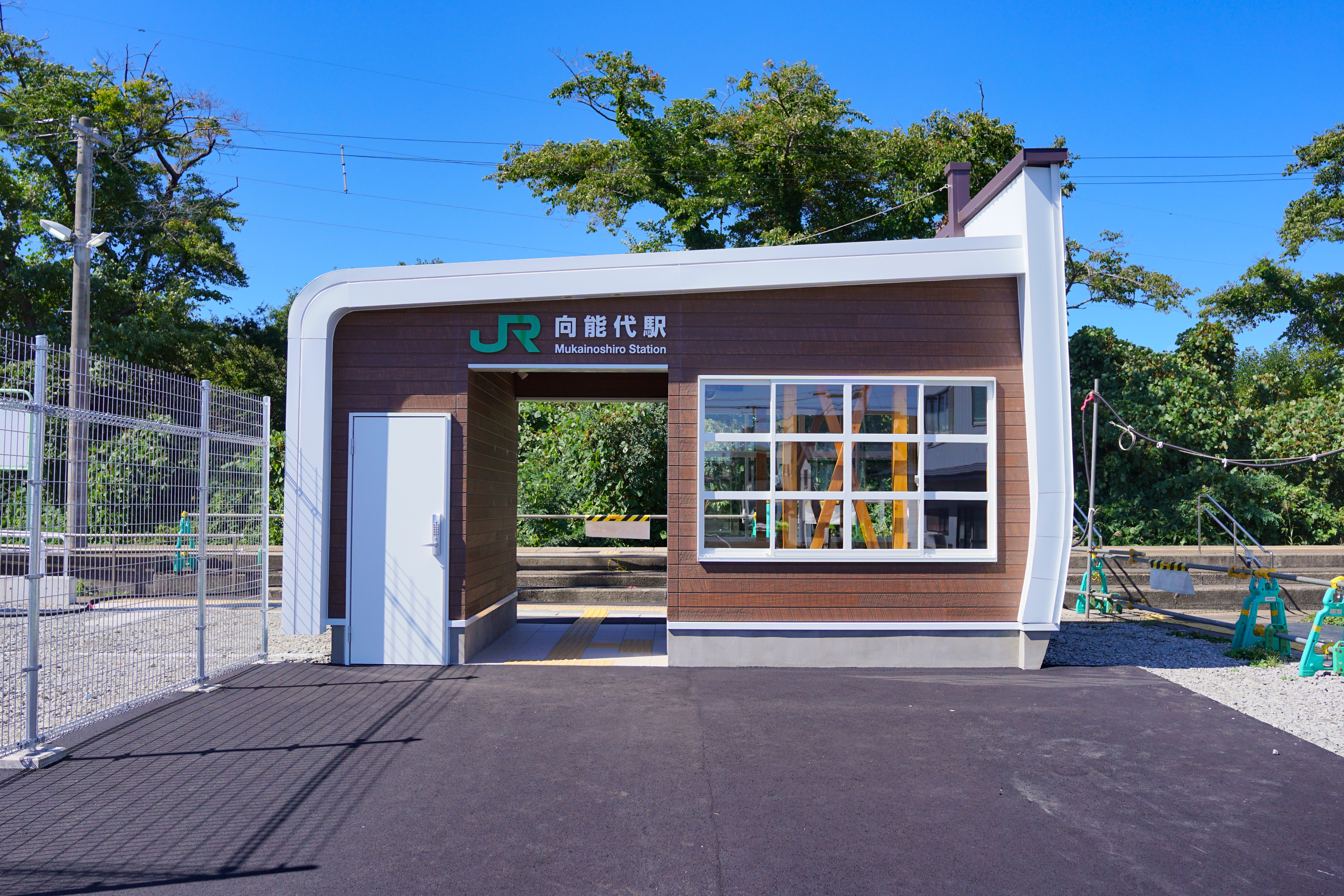
- Mukai-Noshiro Station, September 2024

General information
- Location: Shimoono Ochiai, Noshiro, Akita 016-0014; Japan
- Coordinates: 40°13′32.8″N 140°2′21.4″E
- Operator: JR East
- Line: ■ Gonō Line
- Distance: 6.1 kilometers from Higashi-Noshiro
- Platforms: 1 side platform

Other information
- Status: Staffed
- Website: Official website

History
- Opened: 25 January 1952

Passengers
- FY2018: 30

Services
Preceding station	JR East	Following station
Noshiro towards Higashi-Noshiro	Gonō Line Local	Kita-Noshiro towards Hirosaki
Location
- Location within Akita Prefecture Location within Japan

Mukai-Noshiro Station (向能代駅, Mukai-Noshiro-eki) is a railway station in the city of Noshiro, Akita, Japan, operated by the East Japan Railway Company (JR East).

== Lines ==
Mukai-Noshiro Station is served by the Gonō Line from Higashi-Noshiro and Kawabe, and is located 6.1 km from the terminus of the line at Higashi-Noshiro.

== Station layout ==
The station consists of one ground-level side platform serving a single bidirectional line. The station is staffed.

== History ==
The station opened on 25 January 1952. With the privatization of the Japanese National Railways on 1 April 1987, it came under the operational control of JR East.

== Passenger statistics ==
In fiscal 2018, the station was used by an average of 30 passengers daily (boarding passengers only).

== Surrounding area ==
- Akita Prefectural Noshiro Nishi High School
