= Nanako Takeda =

Japanese footballer

Personal information
- Date of birth: 17 February 2000 (age 26)
- Place of birth: Noshiro, Akita, Japan
- Height: 1.65 m (5 ft 5 in)
- Position: Forward

Team information
- Current team: Speranza Osaka
- Number: 9

Youth career
- 2015-2017: Meisei High School

Senior career*
Years	Team	Apps	(Gls)
2018-2024	MyNavi Sendai	24	(0)
2024-	Speranza Osaka	0	(0)
- * Club domestic league appearances and goals

Nanako Takeda (born 17 February 2000) is a Japanese professional footballer who plays as a forward for Nadeshiko League club Speranza Osaka.

== Club career ==
Takeda made her WE League debut on 17 October 2021.
