= Kita-Noshiro Station =

Railway station in Noshiro, Akita Prefecture, Japan

Kita-Noshiro Station 北能代駅
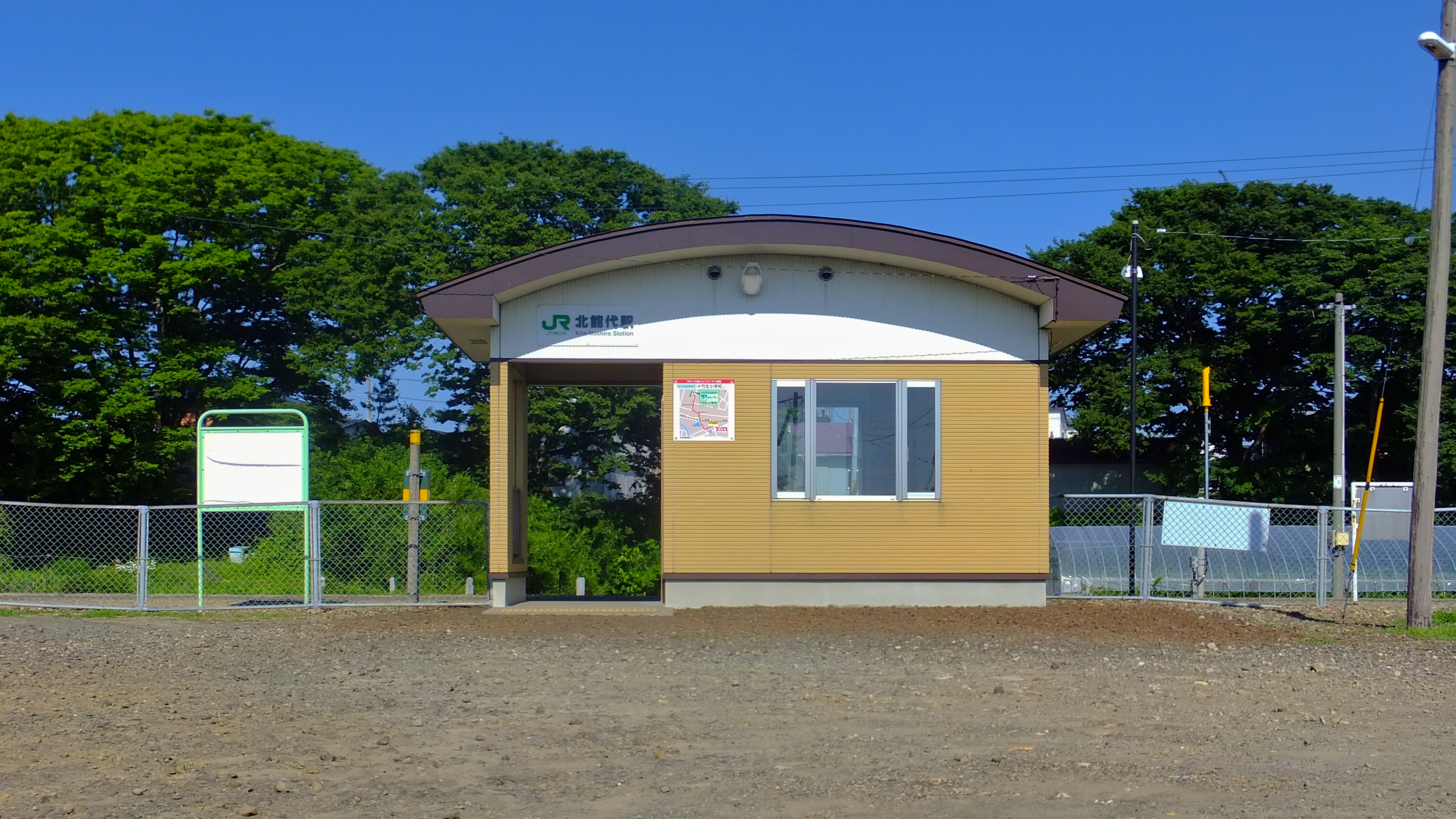
- Kita-Noshiro Station in July 2017

General information
- Location: Maeda Tako 20, Noshiro-shi, Akita-ken 016-0016; Japan
- Coordinates: 40°15′15″N 140°2′0.9″E
- Operator: JR East
- Line: ■ Gonō Line
- Distance: 9.3 kilometers from Higashi-Noshiro
- Platforms: 1 side platform

Other information
- Status: Unstaffed
- Website: Official website

History
- Opened: April 26, 1926
- Former names: Ugo-Shinonome (until 1943)

Services
Preceding station	JR East	Following station
Mukai-Noshiro towards Higashi-Noshiro	Gonō Line Local	Torigata towards Hirosaki
Location
- Location within Akita Prefecture Location within Japan

Kita-Noshiro Station (北能代駅, Kita-Noshiro-eki) is a railway station located in the city of Noshiro, Akita Prefecture, Japan, operated by East Japan Railway Company (JR East).

== Lines ==
Kita-Noshiro Station is served by the Gonō Line and is located 9.3 rail kilometers from the southern terminus of the line at Higashi-Noshiro.

== Station layout ==
The station has one side platform, serving a single bidirectional track. The unattended station is managed from Noshiro Station.

== History ==
Kita-Noshiro Station was opened on April 26, 1926, as Ugo-Shinonome Station (羽後東雲駅) on the Japanese Government Railways (JGR), serving the village of Shinonome, Akita. It was renamed to its present name on June 15, 1943. The JGR became the JNR (Japan National Railways) after World War II. With the privatization of the JNR on April 1, 1987, the station has been managed by JR East. A new station building was completed in 2009, replacing the modified boxcar which had previously been in use.

== Surrounding area ==
- National Route 101
- Nishiro Beach
- Sugisawadai ruins
