= Futatsui Station =

Railway station in Noshiro, Akita Prefecture, Japan

Futatsui Station 二ツ井駅
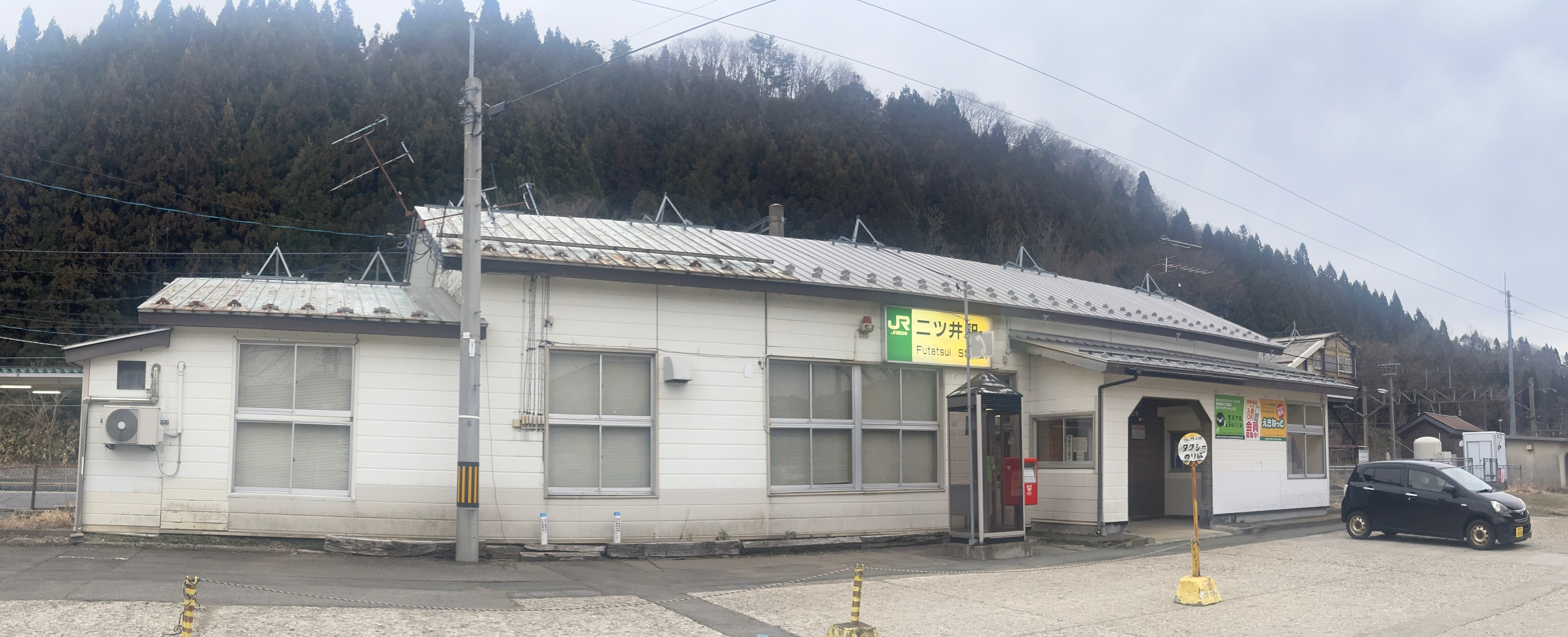
- Futatsui Station (March 26, 2024)

General information
- Location: 12-1 Futatsuimachi-Ōtaomote, Noshiro-shi, Akita-kan 018-3143; Japan
- Coordinates: 40°12′44.87″N 140°14′8.51″E
- Operator: JR East
- Line: ■ Ōu Main Line
- Distance: 372.2 kilometers from Fukushima
- Platforms: 1 side + 1 island platform

Other information
- Status: Staffed
- Website: Official website

History
- Opened: November 1, 1901

Passengers
- FY2018: 303

Services
Preceding station	JR East	Following station
Higashi-Noshiro towards Akita	Tsugaru	Takanosu towards Aomori
Higashi-Noshiro towards Akita	Ōu Main Line Rapid	Takanosu towards Aomori
Tomine towards Shinjō	Ōu Main Line Local	Maeyama towards Aomori
Location
- Location within Akita Prefecture Location within Japan

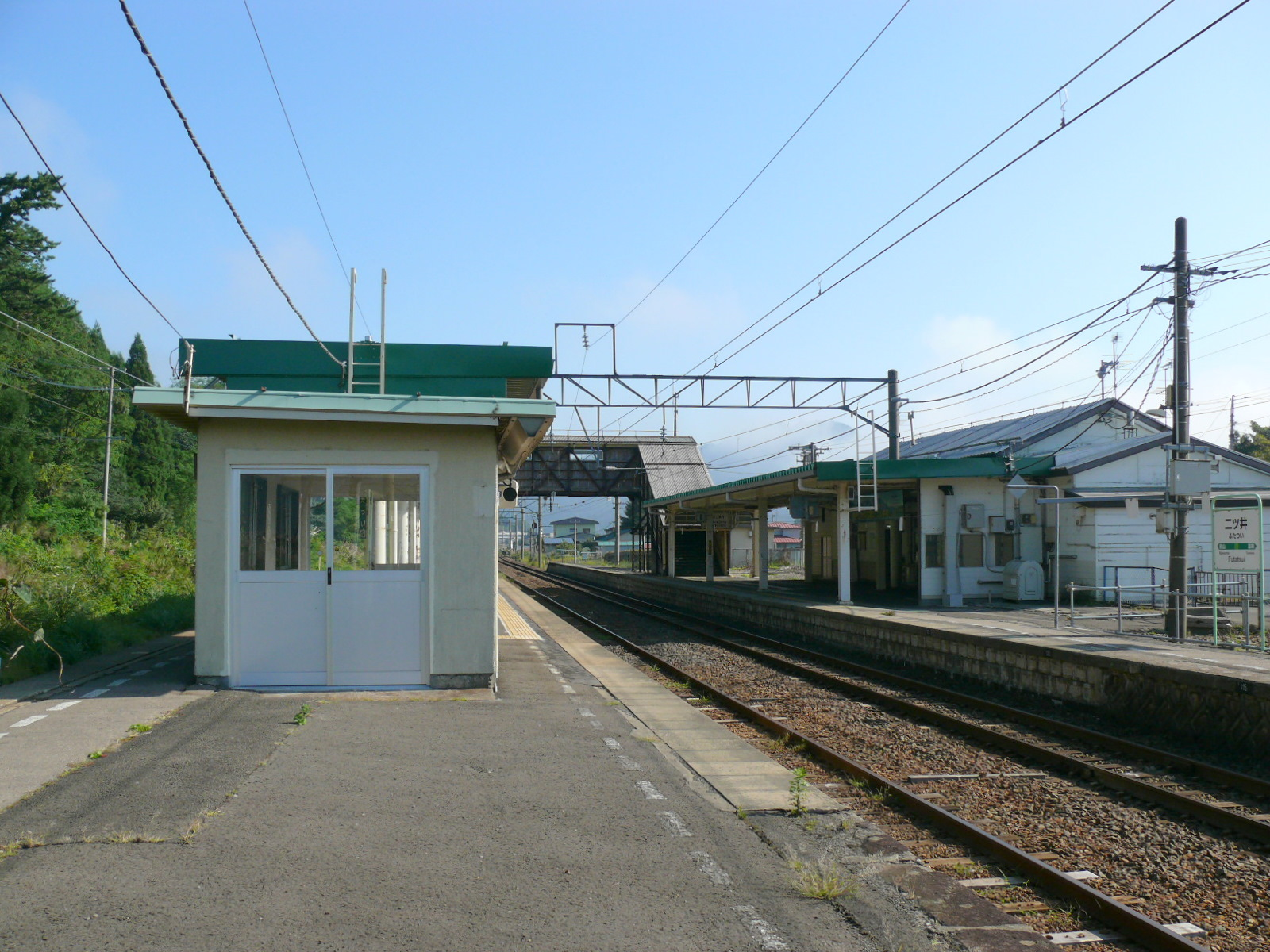
Platform

Futatsui Station (二ツ井駅, Futatsui-eki) is a railway station located in the city of Noshiro, Akita, Japan, operated by the East Japan Railway Company (JR East).

== Lines ==
Futatsui Station is served by the Ōu Main Line, and is located 372.2 km from the terminus of the line at Fukushima Station

== Station layout ==
The station consists of one side platform and one island platform, connected to the station building by a footbridge. The Midori no Madoguchi was closed in March 2021. The station is staffed.

=== Platforms ===
1	■ Ōu Main Line	for Higashi-Noshiro and Akita
2, 3	■ Ōu Main Line	for Ōdate and Hirosaki

== History ==
Futatsui Station was opened on November 1, 1901, as a station on the Japanese Government Railways (JGR), serving the town of Nanakura, Akita. The Nakanishi Tokugoro Light Railway connected to this station from September 25, 1922, to March 1, 1940. The JGR became the Japan National Railways (JNR) after World War II. The station was absorbed into the JR East network upon the privatization of the JNR on April 1, 1987.

== Passenger statistics ==
In fiscal 2018, the station was used by an average of 303 passengers daily (boarding passengers only).

== Surrounding area ==
- former Futatsui Town Hall
- Futatsui High School
