= Matsuo-Hachimantai Station =

Railway station in Hachimantai, Iwate Prefecture, Japan

Matsuo-Hachimantai Station 松尾八幡平駅
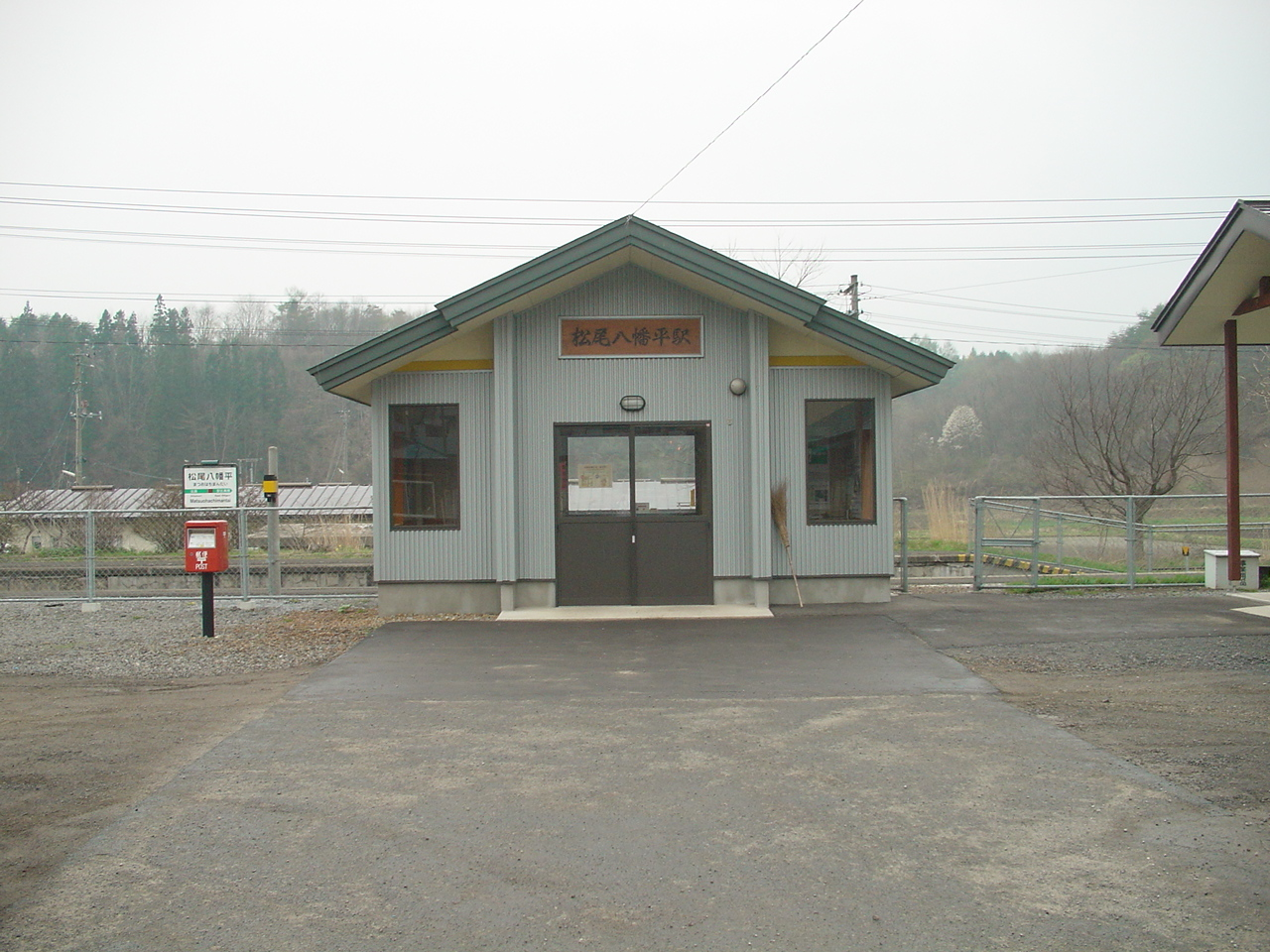
- Matsuo-Hachimantai Station in May 2007

General information
- Location: 109, dai-3 Jiwari, Matsuo, Hachimantai-shi, Iwate-ken 028-7305; Japan
- Coordinates: 39°58′9.3″N 141°2′38.1″E
- Operator: JR East
- Line: ■ Hanawa Line
- Distance: 17.8 km from Kōma
- Platforms: 2 side platforms
- Tracks: 2

Construction
- Structure type: At grade

Other information
- Status: Unstaffed
- Website: Official website

History
- Opened: October 30, 1927
- Former names: Iwate-Matsuo Station (until 1988)

Services
Preceding station	JR East	Following station
Appi-Kōgen towards Ōdate	Hanawa Line	Kitamori towards Morioka
Location
- Location within Japan

Matsuo-Hachimantai Station (松尾八幡平駅, Matsuo-Hachimantai-eki) is a railway station on the Hanawa Line in the city of Hachimantai, Iwate Prefecture, Japan, operated by East Japan Railway Company (JR East).

== Lines ==
Matsuo-Hachimantai Station is served by the 106.9 km Hanawa Line, and is located 17.8 kilometers from the starting point of the line at Kōma.

== Station layout ==
Matsuo-Hachimantai Station has two opposed side platforms connected by a level crossing. The station is unattended.

=== Platforms ===
1	■ Hanawa Line	Kōma, Morioka
2	■ Hanawa Line	Araya-Shinmachi, Kazuno-Hanawa, and Ōdate

== History ==
The station opened on November 10, 1926, as Iwate-Matsuo Station (岩手松尾駅), serving the village of Matsuo. The station was absorbed into the JR East network upon the privatization of JNR on April 1, 1987. It was renamed Matsuo-Hachimantai Station on March 13, 1988.

== Surrounding area ==
- National Route 282

== See also ==
- List of railway stations in Japan
