= Ōbuke Station =

Railway station in Hachimantai, Iwate Prefecture, Japan

Ōbuke Station 大更駅
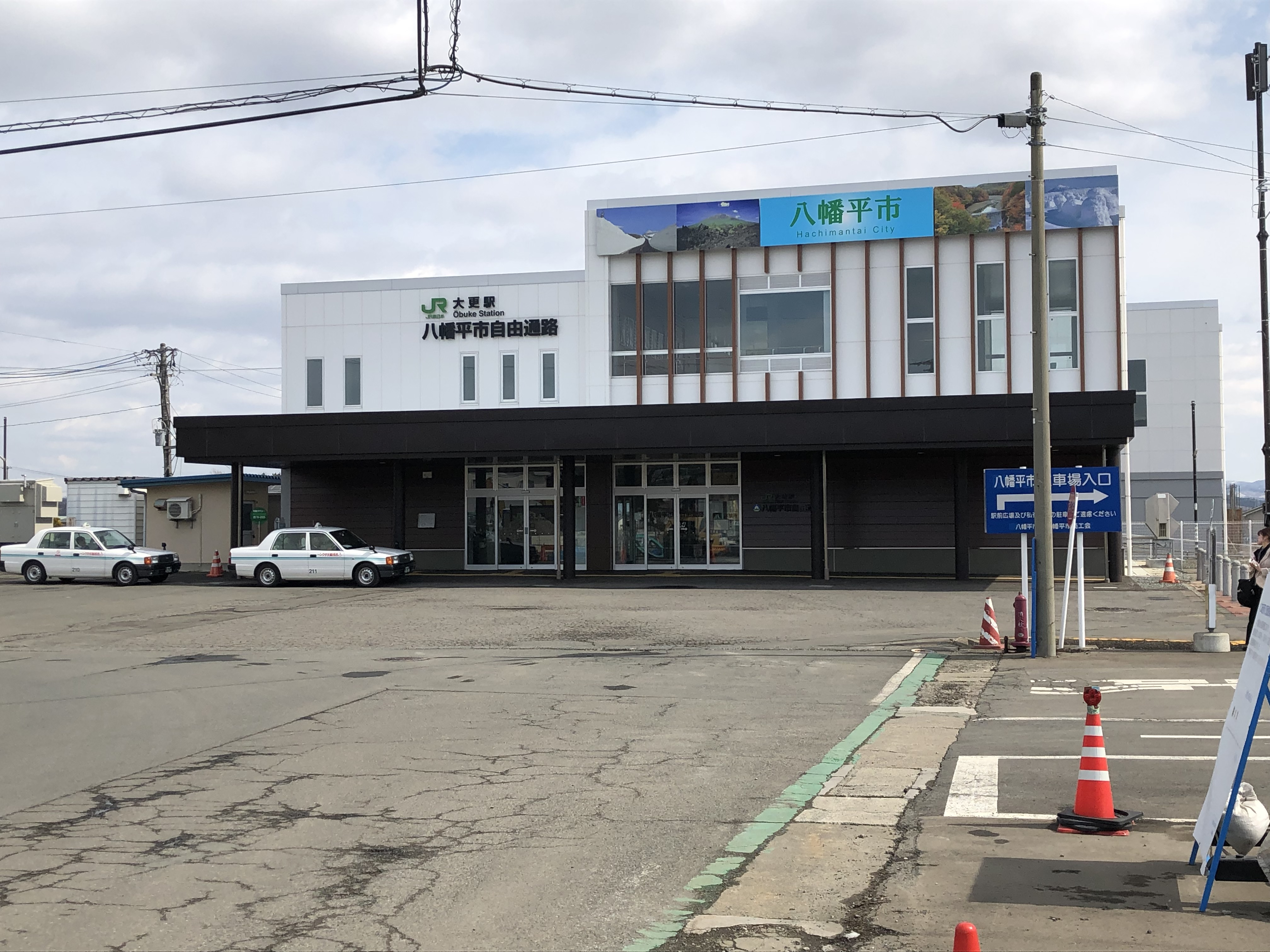
- Ōbuke Station in March 2019

General information
- Location: 25 Chiwari 85, Ōbuke, Hachimantai-shi, Iwate-ken 028-7111; Japan
- Coordinates: 39°54′49.6″N 141°6′2.9″E
- Operator: JR East
- Line: ■ Hanawa Line
- Distance: 9.0 km from Kōma
- Platforms: 2 side platforms
- Tracks: 2

Construction
- Structure type: At grade

Other information
- Status: Staffed (Midori-no-madoguchi)
- Website: Official website

History
- Opened: August 27, 1922
- Rebuilt: 2018

Passengers
- FY2023: 188 daily

Services
Preceding station	JR East	Following station
Tairadate towards Ōdate	Hanawa Line	Higashi-Ōbuke towards Morioka
Location
- Location within Japan

Ōbuke Station (大更駅, Ōbuke-eki) is a railway station on the Hanawa Line in the city of Hachimantai, Iwate Prefecture, Japan, operated by East Japan Railway Company (JR East).

== Lines ==
Ōbuke Station is served by the 106.9 km Hanawa Line, and is located 9.0 kilometers from the starting point of the line at Kōma.

== Station layout ==
Ōbuke Station has two ground-level opposed side platforms connected by a level crossing. The station has a Midori-no-madoguchi staffed ticket office.

=== Platforms ===
1	■ Hanawa Line	for Kōma and Morioka
2	■ Hanawa Line	for Arayashimmachi, Kazuno-Hanawa, and Ōdate

== History ==
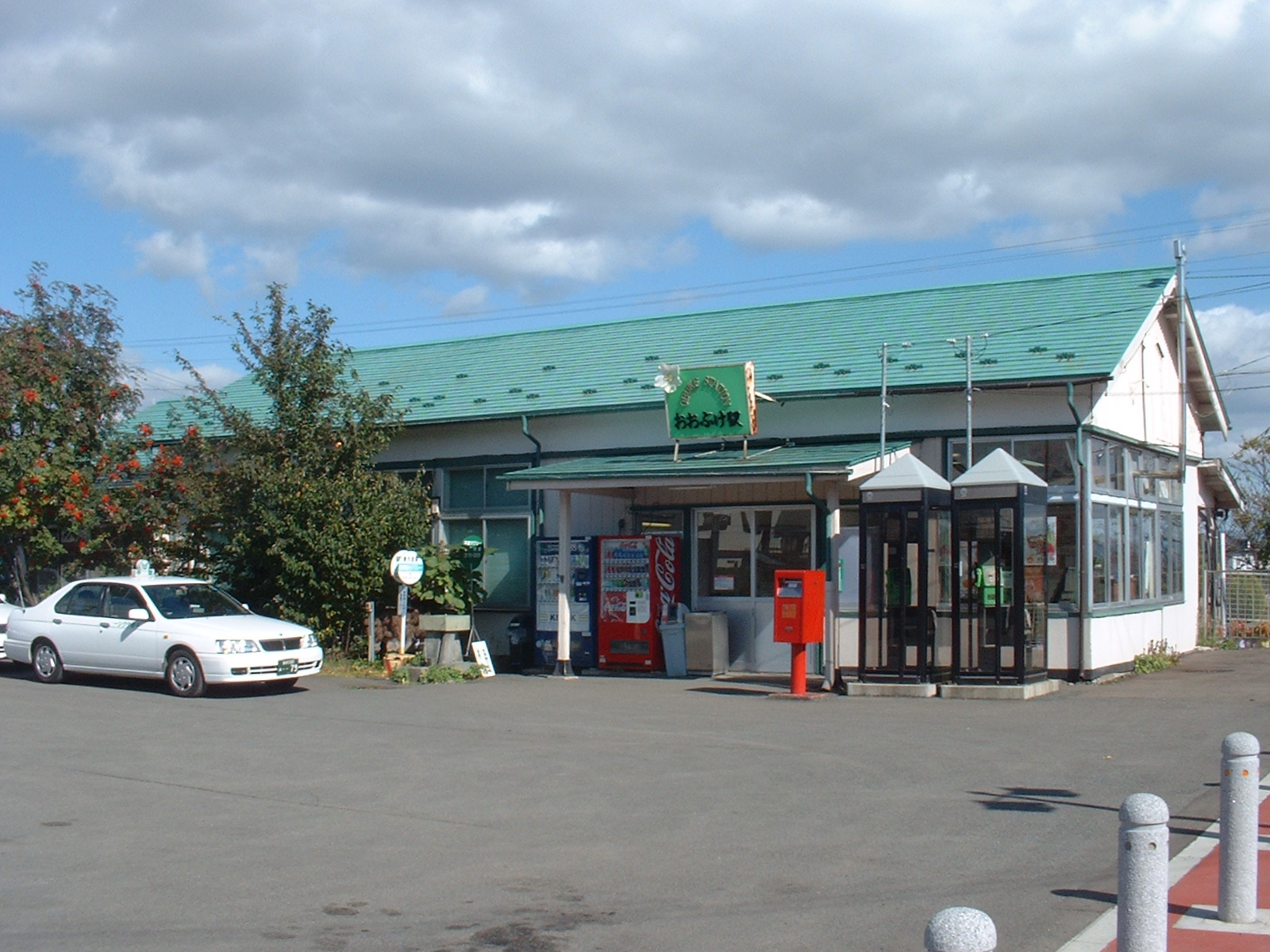
Ōbuke Station in October 2003

Ōbuke Station opened on August 27, 1922, as a station serving the village of Ōbuke. The station was absorbed into the JR East network upon the privatization of JNR on April 1, 1987.

A new station structure was built, opening on 23 February 2018, allowing free access between either side of the station.

== Passenger statistics ==
In fiscal 2023, the station was used by an average of 188 passengers daily (boarding passengers only).

== Surrounding area ==
- National Route 282
- Ōbuke Post Office
- Hachimantai City Hospital

== See also ==
- List of railway stations in Japan
