= Anihata Station =

Railway station in Hachimantai, Iwate Prefecture, Japan

Anihata Station 兄畑駅
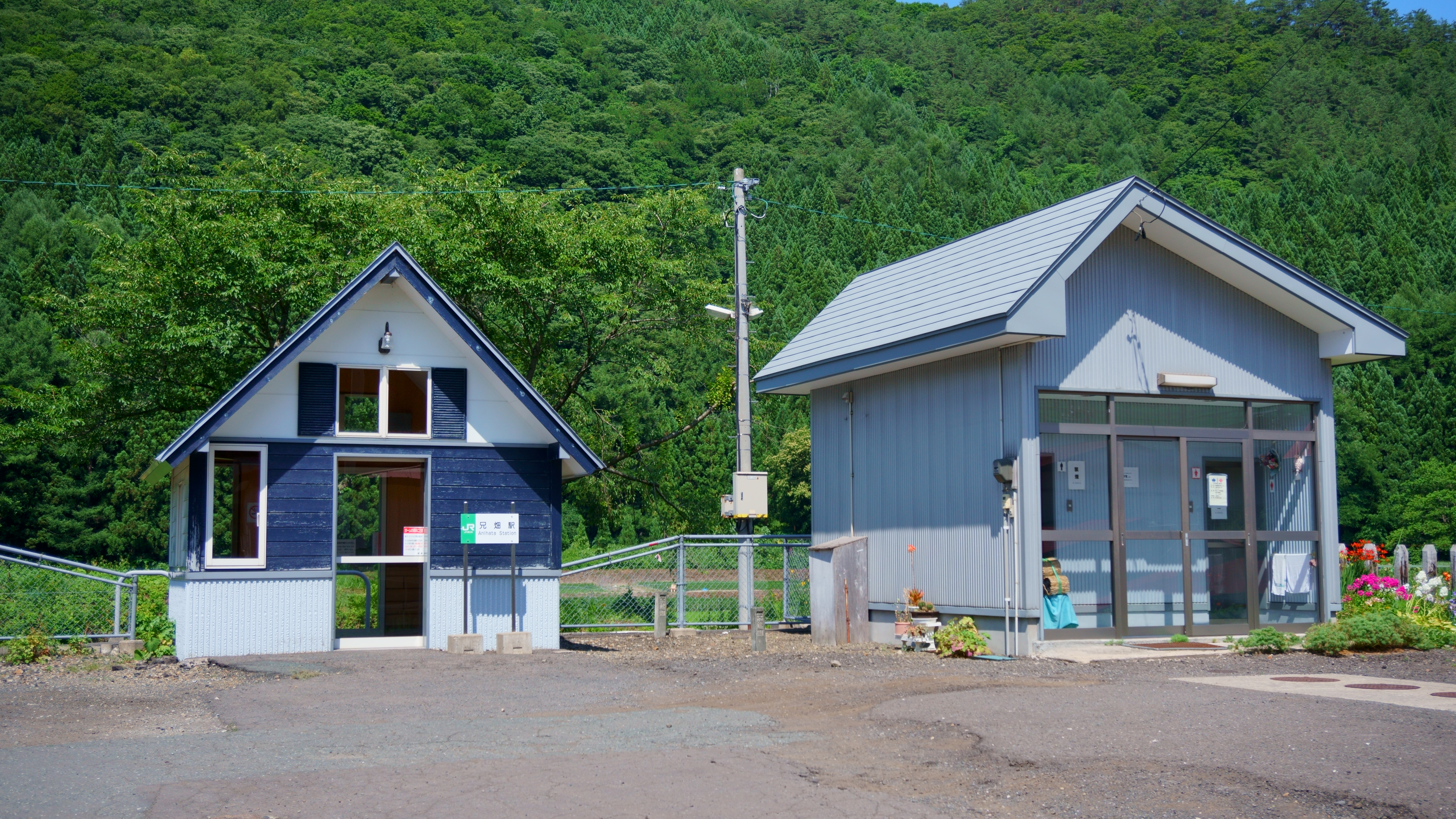
- Anihata Station in July 2021

General information
- Location: Okinotaira, Hachimantai-shi, Iwate-ken 028-7625; Japan
- Coordinates: 40°6′56.7″N 140°52′58.9″E
- Operator: JR East
- Line: ■ Hanawa Line
- Distance: 55.8 km from Kōma
- Platforms: 1 side platform
- Tracks: 1

Construction
- Structure type: At grade

Other information
- Status: Unstaffed
- Website: Official website

History
- Opened: October 17, 1931

Services
Preceding station	JR East	Following station
Yuze-Onsen towards Ōdate	Hanawa Line	Tayama towards Morioka
Location
- Location within Japan

Anihata Station (兄畑駅, Anihata-eki) is a railway station on the Hanawa Line in the city of Hachimantai, Iwate Prefecture, Japan, operated by East Japan Railway Company (JR East).

== Lines ==
Anihata Station is served by the 106.9 km Hanawa Line, and is located 55.8 kilometers from the starting point of the line at Kōma.

== Station layout ==
The station consists of a single ground-level side platform serving a single bi-directional track. The station is unattended.

== History ==
Anihata Station opened on October 17, 1931, serving the village of Tayama. The station was absorbed into the JR East network upon the privatization of JNR on April 1, 1987.

== Surrounding area ==
- National Route 282
- Yoneshiro River

== See also ==
- List of railway stations in Japan
