= Rikuchū-Ōsato Station =

Railway station in Kazuno, Akita Prefecture, Japan

Rikuchū-Ōsato Station 陸中大里駅
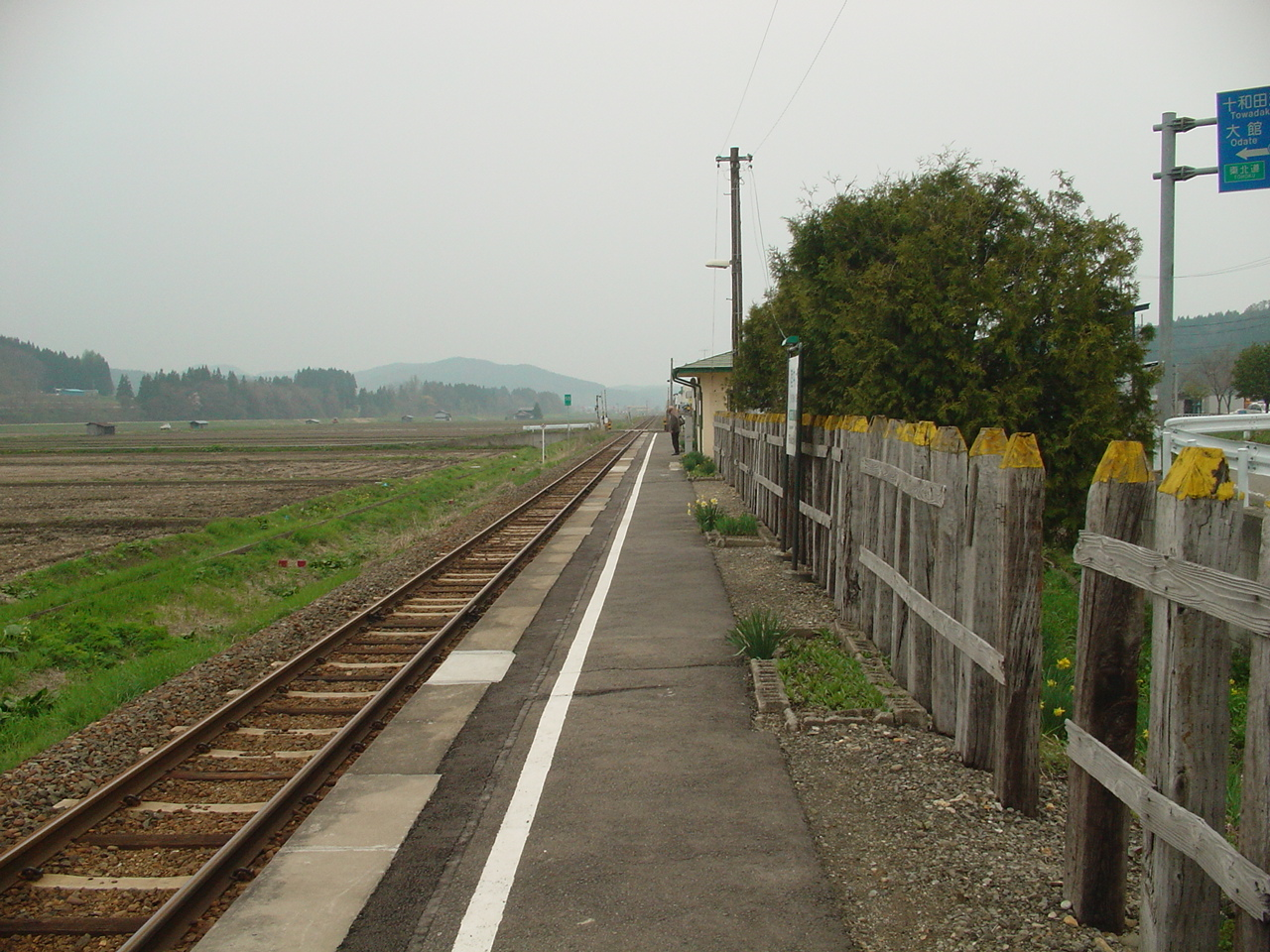
- Rikuchū-Ōsato Station in May 2007

General information
- Location: Hachimantai Ōsato, Kazuno-shi, Akita-ken 018-5141; Japan
- Coordinates: 40°9′30.5″N 140°47′36.7″E
- Operator: JR East
- Line: ■ Hanawa Line
- Distance: 66.1 km from Kōma
- Platforms: 1 side platform
- Tracks: 1

Construction
- Structure type: At grade

Other information
- Status: Unstaffed
- Website: Official website

History
- Opened: December 1, 1960

Services
Preceding station	JR East	Following station
Kazuno-Hanawa towards Ōdate	Hanawa Line	Hachimantai towards Morioka
Location
- Location within Akita Prefecture Location within Japan

Rikuchū-Ōsato Station (陸中大里駅, Rikuchū-Ōsato-eki) is a JR East railway station located in the city of Kazuno, Akita Prefecture, Japan.

== Lines ==
Rikuchū-Ōsato Station is served by the Hanawa Line, and is located 66.1 rail kilometers from the terminus of the line at Kōma Station.

== Station layout ==
Rikuchū-Ōsato Station consists of one side platform serving a single bi-directional track. The station is unattended.

== History ==
Rikuchū-Ōsato Station was opened on December 1, 1960 as a station on the Japan National Railways (JNR), serving the village of Hachimantai, Akita. The station was absorbed into the JR East network upon the privatization of the JNR on April 1, 1987.

== Surrounding area ==
- National Route 282
- Tohoku Expressway - Kazuno-Hachimantai Interchange

== See also ==
- List of railway stations in Japan
