= Tayama Station =

Railway station in Hachimantai, Iwate Prefecture, Japan

Tayama Station 田山駅
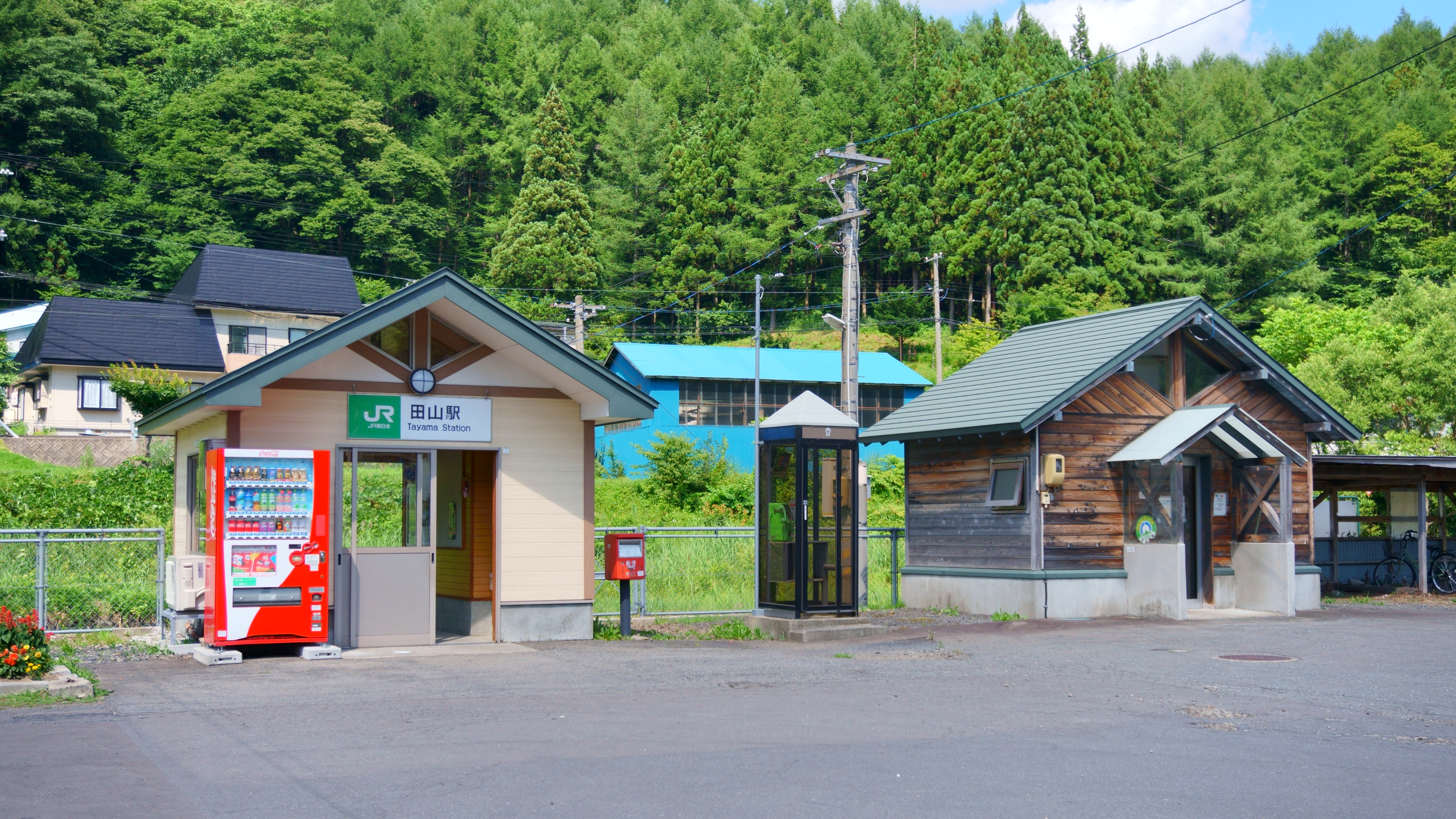
- Tayama Station in July 2021

General information
- Location: 11 Ishinazaka, Hachimantai-shi, Iwate-ken 028-7615; Japan
- Coordinates: 40°8′23″N 140°56′38.7″E
- Operator: JR East
- Line: ■ Hanawa Line
- Distance: 49.1 km from Kōma
- Platforms: 1 side platform
- Tracks: 1

Construction
- Structure type: At grade

Other information
- Status: Unstaffed
- Website: Official website

History
- Opened: October 25, 1929

Services
Preceding station	JR East	Following station
Anihata towards Ōdate	Hanawa Line	Yokoma towards Morioka
Location
- Location within Japan

Tayama Station (田山駅, Tayama-eki) is a JR East railway station on the Hanawa Line in the city of Hachimantai, Iwate Prefecture, Japan.

== Lines ==
Tayama Station is served by the 106.9 km Hanawa Line, and is located 49.1 kilometers from the starting point of the line at Kōma.

== Station layout ==
Tayama Station consists of a single ground-level side platform serving a single bi-directional track. The station is unattended.

== History ==
Tayama Station opened on October 25, 1929, serving the village of Tayama. The station was absorbed into the JR East network upon the privatization of JNR on April 1, 1987.

== Surrounding area ==
- National Route 282
- Tayama Post Office
- Tayama Ski Resort
- Tayama Onsen

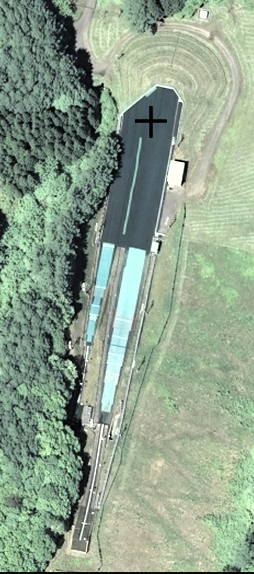
Ski jumping hills at Tayama Ski Resort

== See also ==
- List of railway stations in Japan
