= Akasakata Station =

Railway station in Hachimantai, Iwate Prefecture, Japan

Akasakata Station 赤坂田駅
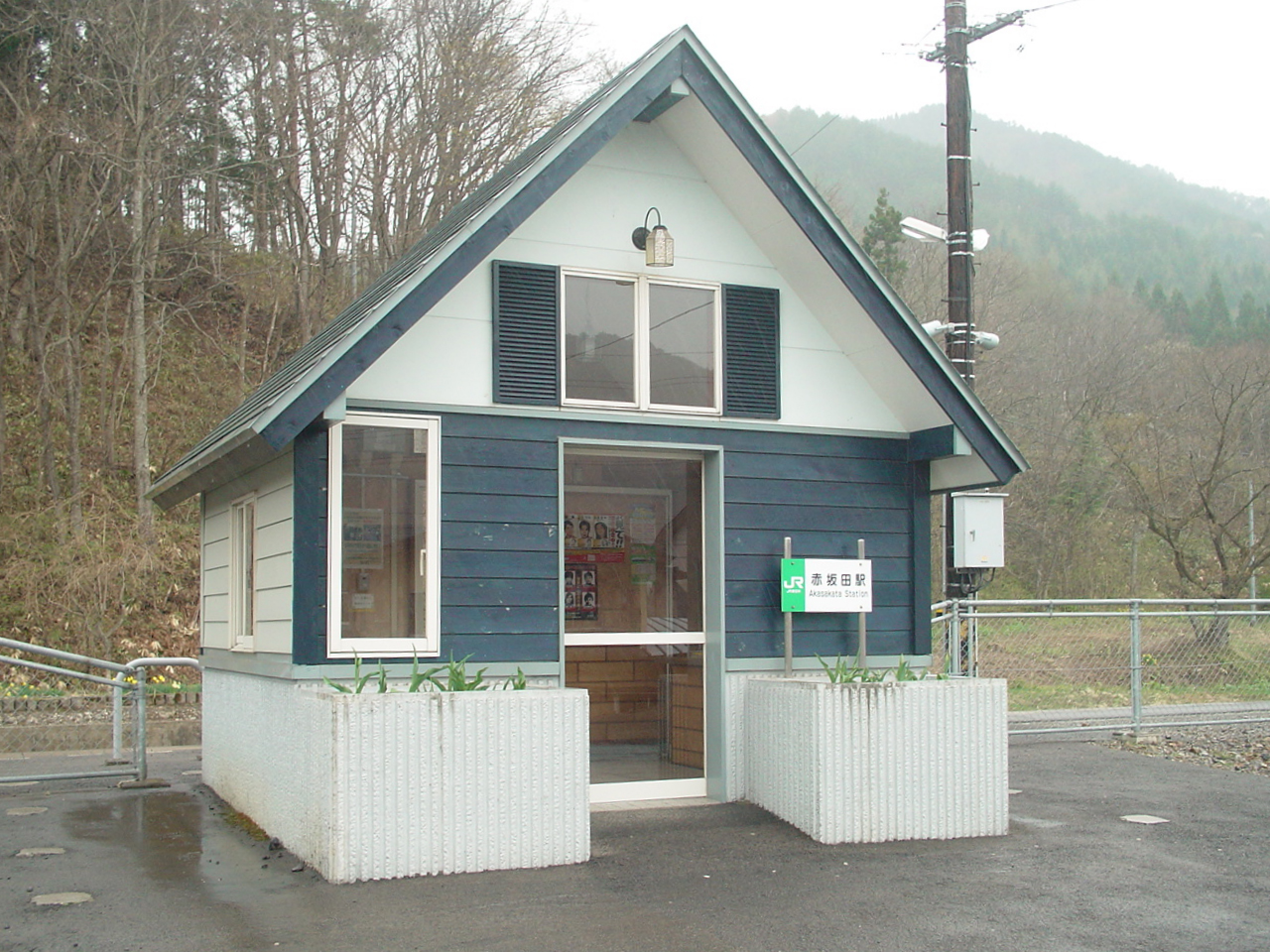
- Akasakata Station in May 2007

General information
- Location: 203 Akasakata, Hachimantai-shi, Iwate-ken 028-7554; Japan
- Coordinates: 40.0487°N 141.0039°E
- Operator: JR East
- Line: ■ Hanawa Line
- Distance: 30.0 km from Kōma
- Platforms: 1 side platform
- Tracks: 1

Construction
- Structure type: At grade

Other information
- Status: Unstaffed
- Website: Official website

History
- Opened: November 10, 1926

Services
Preceding station	JR East	Following station
Koyanohata towards Ōdate	Hanawa Line	Appi-Kōgen towards Morioka
Location
- Location within Japan

Akasakata Station (赤坂田駅, Akasakata-eki) is a railway station on the Hanawa Line in the city of Hachimantai, Iwate Prefecture, Japan, operated by East Japan Railway Company (JR East).

== Lines ==
Akasakata Station is served by the 106.9 km Hanawa Line, and is located 30.0 kilometers from the starting point of the line at Kōma.

== Station layout ==
Akasakata Station has one ground-level side platform serving a single bi-directional track. The station is unattended.

== History ==
Akasakata Station opened on November 10, 1926, serving the village of Arasawa. The station was absorbed into the JR East network upon the privatization of JNR on April 1, 1987.

== Surrounding area ==
- National Route 282

== See also ==
- List of railway stations in Japan
