= Yuze-Onsen Station =

Railway station in Kazuno, Akita Prefecture, Japan

Yuze-Onsen Station 湯瀬温泉駅
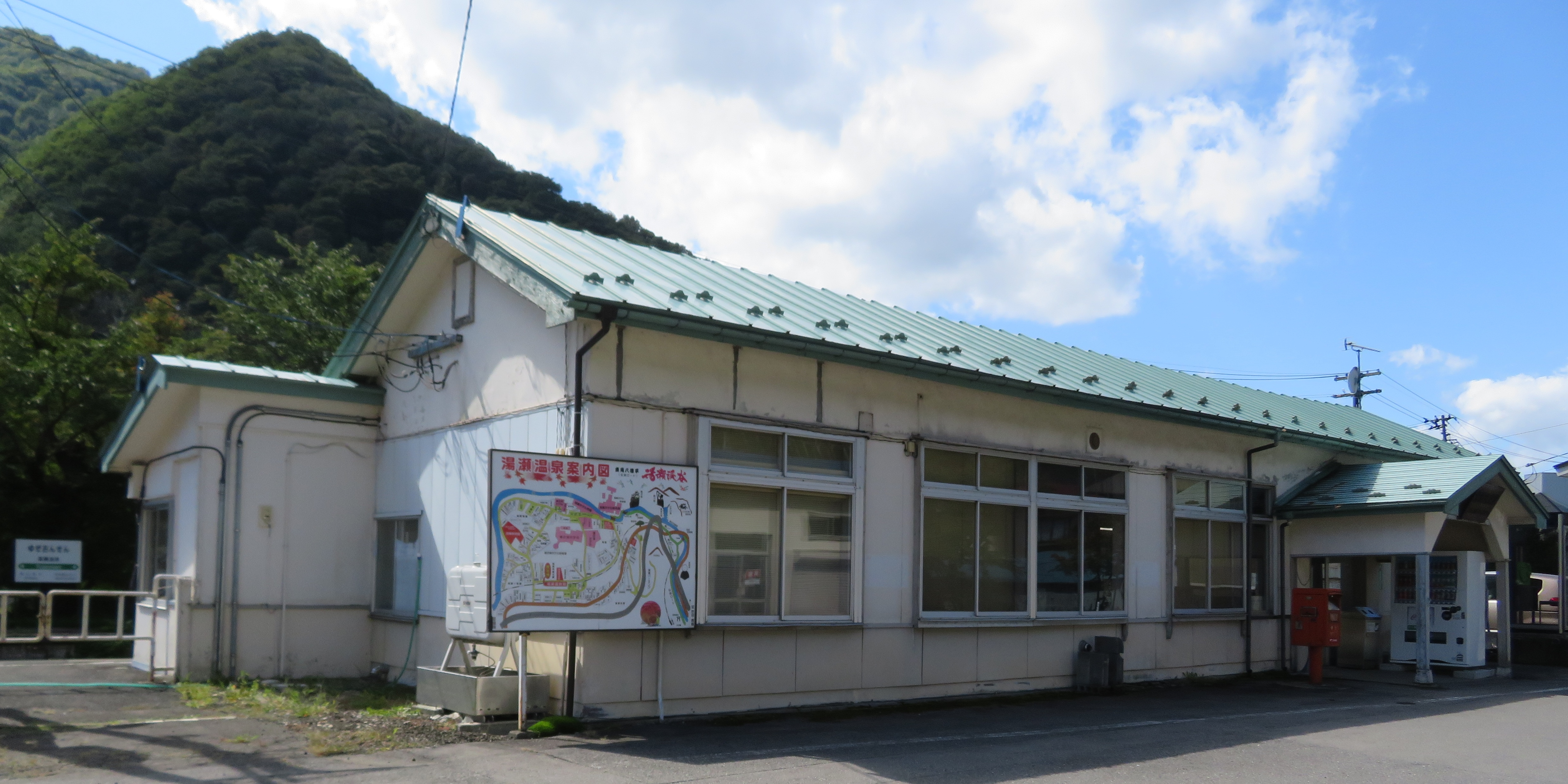
- Yuze-Onsen Station in August 2006

General information
- Location: Hachimantai aze Yuze 53-4, Kazuno-shi, Akita-ken 018-5141; Japan
- Coordinates: 40°7′20.55″N 140°50′25.45″E
- Operator: JR East
- Line: ■ Hanawa Line
- Distance: 59.9 km from Kōma
- Platforms: 1 side platform
- Tracks: 1

Construction
- Structure type: At grade

Other information
- Status: Staffed
- Website: Official website

History
- Opened: October 17, 1931
- Former names: Yuze Station (to 1995)

Passengers
- FY2018: 247

Services
Preceding station	JR East	Following station
Hachimantai towards Ōdate	Hanawa Line	Anihata towards Morioka
Location
- Location within Akita Prefecture Location within Japan

Yuze-Onsen Station (湯瀬温泉駅, Yuze-Onsen-eki) is a JR East railway station located in the city of Kazuno, Akita Prefecture, Japan.

== Lines ==
Yuze-Onsen Station is served by the Hanawa Line, and is located 59.9 rail kilometers from the terminus of the line at Kōma Station.

== Station layout ==
Yuze-Onsen Station consists of one side platform serving a single bi-directional track. The station is a kan'i itaku station administered by Kazuno-Hanawa Station and operated by Yuze-Onsen meeting group, with point-of-sales terminal installed. Ordinary tickets, express tickets, and reserved-seat tickets for all JR lines are on sale (no connecting tickets).

== History ==
Yuze-Onsen Station was opened on October 17, 1931 as Yuze Station (湯瀬駅) on the privately owned Akita Railways, serving the village of Hachimantai, Akita. The line was nationalized on June 1, 1934, becoming part of the Japanese Government Railways (JGR) system. The JGR became the Japan National Railways (JNR) after World War II. The station was renamed to its present name on December 1, 1995. The station has been unattended since October 1, 1971. The station was absorbed into the JR East network upon the privatization of the JNR on April 1, 1987.

== Passenger statistics ==
In fiscal 2018, the station was used by an average of 24 passengers daily (boarding passengers only).

== Surrounding area ==
- National Route 282
- Tohoku Expressway - Yuze Parking Area
- Yuze hot springs

== See also ==
- List of railway stations in Japan
