= Appi-Kōgen Station =

Railway station in Japan

Appi-Kōgen Station 安比高原駅
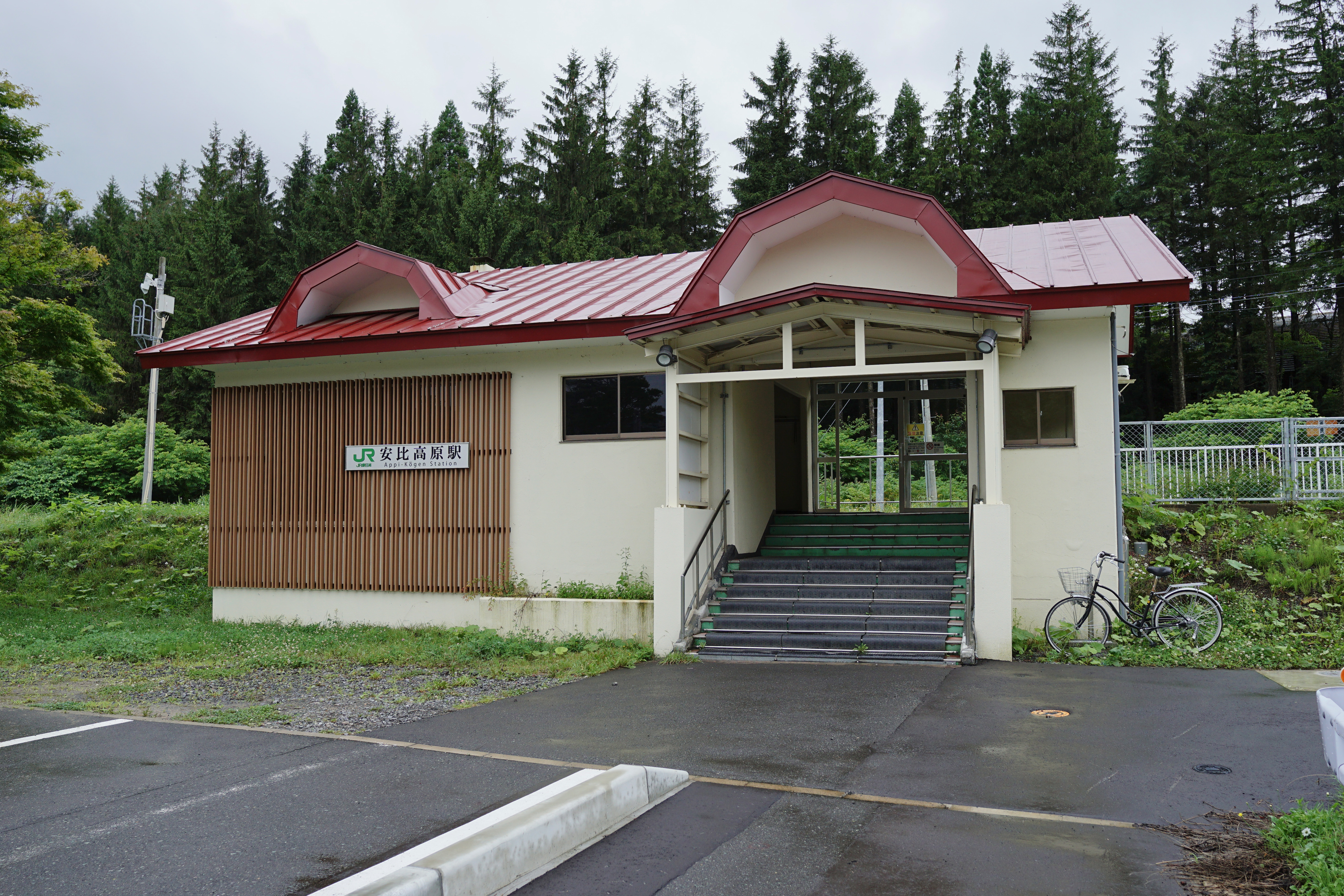
- Appi-Kōgen Station in July 2023

General information
- Location: Appi-Kōgen, Hachimantai-shi, Iwate-ken 028-7306; Japan
- Coordinates: 40°0′45.3″N 140°59′50.3″E
- Operator: JR East
- Line: ■ Hanawa Line
- Distance: 25.0 km from Kōma
- Platforms: 1 side platform
- Tracks: 1

Construction
- Structure type: At grade

Other information
- Status: Unstaffed
- Website: Official website

History
- Opened: December 28, 1961
- Former names: Ryūgamori (until March 1988)

Services
Preceding station	JR East	Following station
Akasakata towards Ōdate	Hanawa Line	Matsuo-Hachimantai towards Morioka
Location
- Location within Japan

Appi-Kōgen Station (安比高原駅, Appi-Kōgen-eki) is a railway station on the Hanawa Line in the city of Hachimantai, Iwate Prefecture, Japan, operated by East Japan Railway Company (JR East).

== Lines ==
Appi-Kōgen Station is served by the 106.9 km Hanawa Line, and is located 25.0 kilometers from the starting point of the line at Kōma.

== Station layout ==
Appi-Kōgen Station has one ground-level side platform serving a single bi-directional track. The station is unattended.

== History ==
The station opened on December 28, 1961, as Ryūgamori Station (龍ヶ森駅). It was absorbed into the JR East network upon the privatization of JNR on April 1, 1987, and was renamed Appi-Kōgen Station on March 13, 1988.

== Surrounding area ==
- National Route 282
- Appi-Kōgen Golf Club and Ski Resort

== See also ==
- List of railway stations in Japan
