= Tairadate Station =

Railway station in Hachimantai, Iwate Prefecture, Japan

Tairadate Station 平館駅
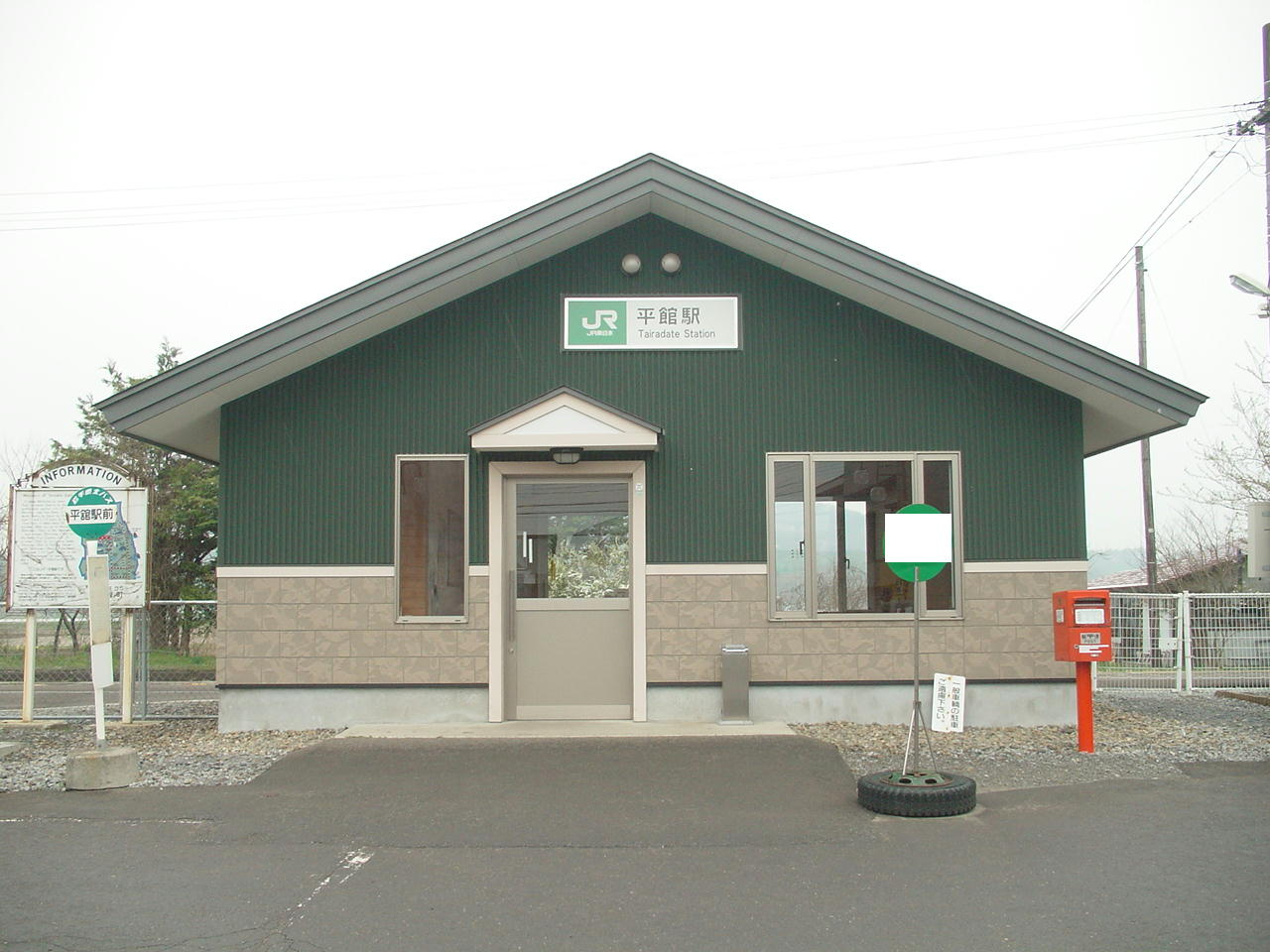
- Tairadate Station in May 2007

General information
- Location: Tairadate 11 Jiwari, Hachimantai-shi, Iwate-ken 028-7405; Japan
- Coordinates: 39°57′3.4″N 141°5′7.5″E
- Operator: JR East
- Line: ■ Hanawa Line
- Distance: 13.7 km from Kōma
- Platforms: 1 side platform
- Tracks: 1

Construction
- Structure type: At grade

Other information
- Status: Unstaffed
- Website: Official website

History
- Opened: August 27, 1922

Services
Preceding station	JR East	Following station
Kitamori towards Ōdate	Hanawa Line	Ōbuke towards Morioka
Location
- Location within Japan

Tairadate Station (平館駅, Tairadate-eki) is an East Japan Railway Company (JR East) railway station on the Hanawa Line in the city of Hachimantai, Iwate Prefecture, Japan.

== Lines ==
Tairadate Station is served by the 106.9 km Hanawa Line, and is located 13.7 kilometers from the starting point of the line at Kōma.

== Station layout ==
Tairadate Station has a single ground-level side platform serving a single bi-directional track. The station is unattended.

== History ==
Tairadate Station opened on August 27, 1922, as a station serving the village of Tairadate. The station was absorbed into the JR East network upon the privatization of JNR on April 1, 1987.

== Surrounding area ==
- National Route 282
- Tairadate Post Office

== See also ==
- List of railway stations in Japan
