= Hachimantai Station =

Railway station in Kazuno, Akita Prefecture, Japan

Hachimantai Station 八幡平駅
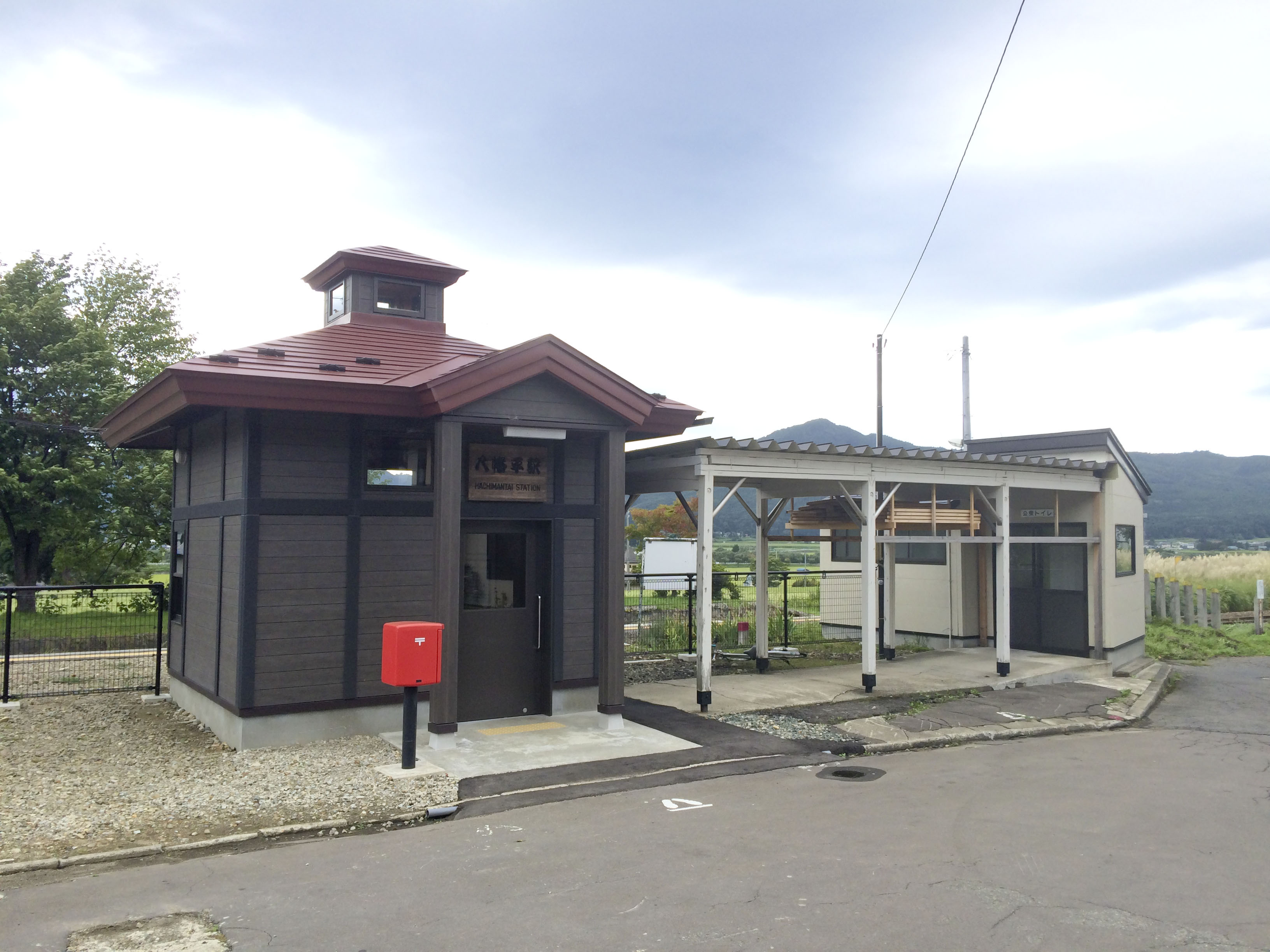
- Hachimantai Station in August 2015

General information
- Location: Hachimantai Koyama, Kazuno-shi, Akita-ken 018-5141; Japan
- Coordinates: 40°8′35.9″N 140°48′15.9″E
- Operator: JR East
- Line: ■ Hanawa Line
- Distance: 64.2 km from Kōma
- Platforms: 1 side platform
- Tracks: 1

Construction
- Structure type: At grade

Other information
- Status: Unstaffed
- Website: Official website

History
- Opened: October 17, 1931
- Former names: Azukisawa Station (to 1957)

Passengers
- FY2013: 25

Services
Preceding station	JR East	Following station
Rikuchū-Ōsato towards Ōdate	Hanawa Line	Yuze-Onsen towards Morioka
Location
- Location within Akita Prefecture Location within Japan

Hachimantai Station (八幡平駅, Hachimantai-eki) is a JR East railway station located in the city of Kazuno, Akita Prefecture, Japan.

== Lines ==
Hachimantai Station is served by the Hanawa Line, and is located 64.2 rail kilometers from the terminus of the line at Kōma Station.

== Station layout ==
Hachimantai Station consists of one side platform serving a single bi-directional track. The station is unattended.

== History ==
Hachimantai Station was opened on October 17, 1931 as Azukisawa Station (小豆沢駅) on the privately owned Akita Railways, serving the village of Hachimantai, Akita. The line was nationalized on June 1, 1934, becoming part of the Japanese Government Railways (JGR) system. The JGR became the Japan National Railways (JNR) after World War II. The station was renamed to its present name on April 1, 1957. The station has been unattended since October 1, 1971. The station was absorbed into the JR East network upon the privatization of the JNR on April 1, 1987.

== Passenger statistics ==
In fiscal 2013 (the last year for which data is available), the station was used by an average of 25 passengers daily (boarding passengers only).

== Surrounding area ==
- National Route 282
- National Route 341
- Hachimantai mountains

== See also ==
- List of railway stations in Japan
