= Koyanohata Station =

Railway station in Hachimantai, Iwate Prefecture, Japan

Koyanohata Station 小屋の畑駅
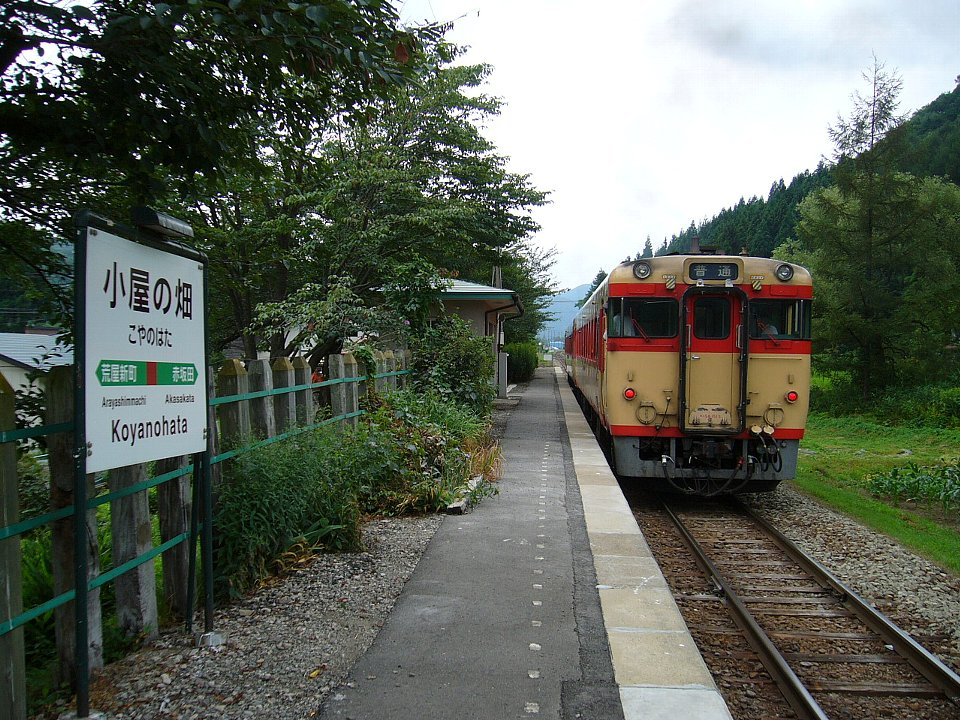
- Koyanohata Station in August 2006

General information
- Location: Hotozaka, Hachimantai-shi, Iwate-ken 028-7544; Japan
- Coordinates: 40°4′35.3″N 141°1′14.45″E
- Operator: JR East
- Line: ■ Hanawa Line
- Distance: 33.6 km from Kōma
- Platforms: 1 side platform
- Tracks: 1

Construction
- Structure type: At grade

Other information
- Status: Unstaffed
- Website: Official website

History
- Opened: December 1, 1960

Services
Preceding station	JR East	Following station
Araya-Shinmachi towards Ōdate	Hanawa Line	Akasakata towards Morioka
Location
- Location within Japan

Koyanohata Station (小屋の畑駅, Koyanohata-eki) is a JR East railway station on the Hanawa Line in the city of Hachimantai, Iwate Prefecture, Japan.

== Lines ==
Koyanohata Station is served by the 106.9 km Hanawa Line, and is located 33.6 kilometers from the starting point of the line at Kōma.

== Station layout ==
Koyanohata Station has one ground-level side platform serving a single bi-directional track. There is a rain shelter on the platform, but no station building. The station is unattended.

== History ==
Koyanohata Station opened on December 1, 1960, serving the town of Ashiro. The station was absorbed into the JR East network upon the privatization of JNR on April 1, 1987.

== Surrounding area ==
- National Route 282

== See also ==
- List of railway stations in Japan
