= Higashi-Ōdate Station =

Railway station in Ōdate, Akita Prefecture, Japan

Higashi-Ōdate Station 東大館駅
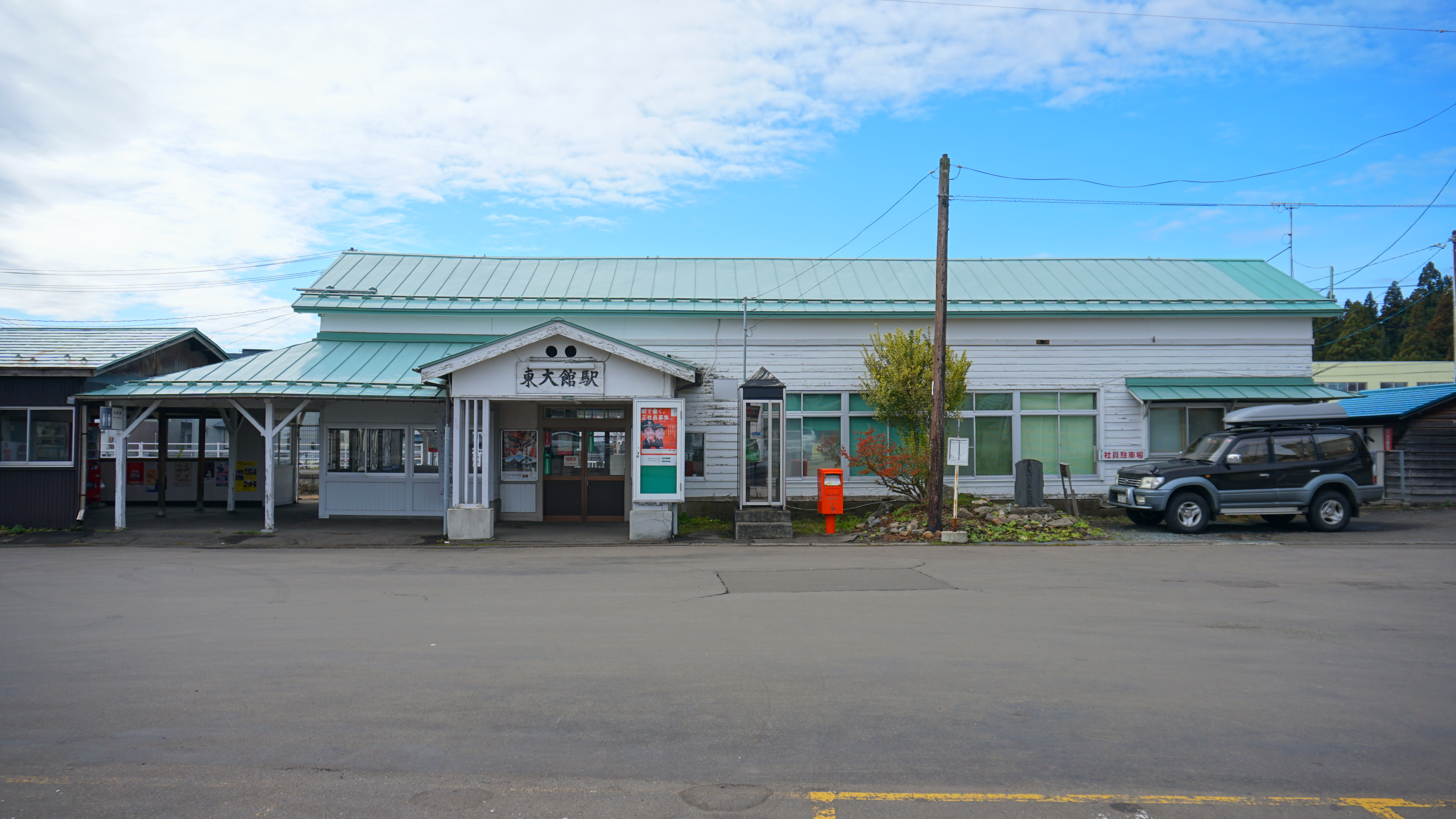
- Higashi-Ōdate Station, November 2019

General information
- Location: 14-1 Tokiwagichō Ōdate shi, Akita-ken 017-0846; Japan
- Coordinates: 40°16′0.06″N 140°33′16.51″E
- Operator: JR East
- Line: ■ Hanawa Line
- Distance: 103.3 kilometers from Kōma
- Platforms: 1 side + 1 island platform

Other information
- Status: Staffed
- Website: Official website

History
- Opened: July 1, 1914

Passengers
- FY2018: 218

Services
Preceding station	JR East	Following station
Ōdate Terminus	Hanawa Line	Ōgita towards Morioka
Location
- Location within Akita Prefecture Location within Japan

Higashi-Ōdate Station (東大館駅, Higashi-Ōdate-eki) is a railway station located in the city of Ōdate, Akita Prefecture, Japan, operated by the East Japan Railway Company (JR East).

== Lines ==
Higashi-Ōdate Station is served by the Hanawa Line, and is located 103.3 km from the terminus of the line at Kōma.

== Station layout ==
The station was built with an island platform, but one side of the platform is not in use, thus rendering the station to be a single side platform serving bi-directional traffic. The station is unattended. Higashi-Ōdate Station is administered by Kazuno-Hanawa Station and operated by Jaster Co., Ltd. Ordinary tickets, express tickets, and reserved-seat tickets for all JR lines are on sale.

== History ==
Higashi-Ōdate Station was opened on July 1, 1914 on the privately owned Akita Railways, serving the town of Ōdate, Akita. The line was nationalized on June 1, 1934, becoming part of the Japanese Government Railways (JGR) system, which became the Japan National Railways (JNR) after World War II. The station was absorbed into the JR East network upon the privatization of the JNR on April 1, 1987. The station has been unattended since April 2003.

== Passenger statistics ==
In fiscal 2018, the station was used by an average of 213 passengers daily (boarding passengers only).

== Surrounding area ==
- Akita District Courthouse, Ōdate Branch
- Ōdate City Baseball Fields
- Ōdate City Hall
- Ōdate First Junior High School
- National Route 7
- National Route 103

== See also ==
- List of railway stations in Japan
