= Kitamori =

Kitamori (written: 北森) is a Japanese surname. Notable people with the surname include:

- Ikuko Kitamori (北森 郁子, born 1963), Japanese discus thrower
- Kazoh Kitamori (北森 嘉蔵, 1916–1998), Japanese Lutheran theologian

== See also ==
- Kitamori Station, a railway station in Hachimantai, Iwate Prefecture, Japan
