= Towada-Minami Station =

Railway station in Kazuno, Akita Prefecture, Japan

Towada-Minami Station 十和田南駅
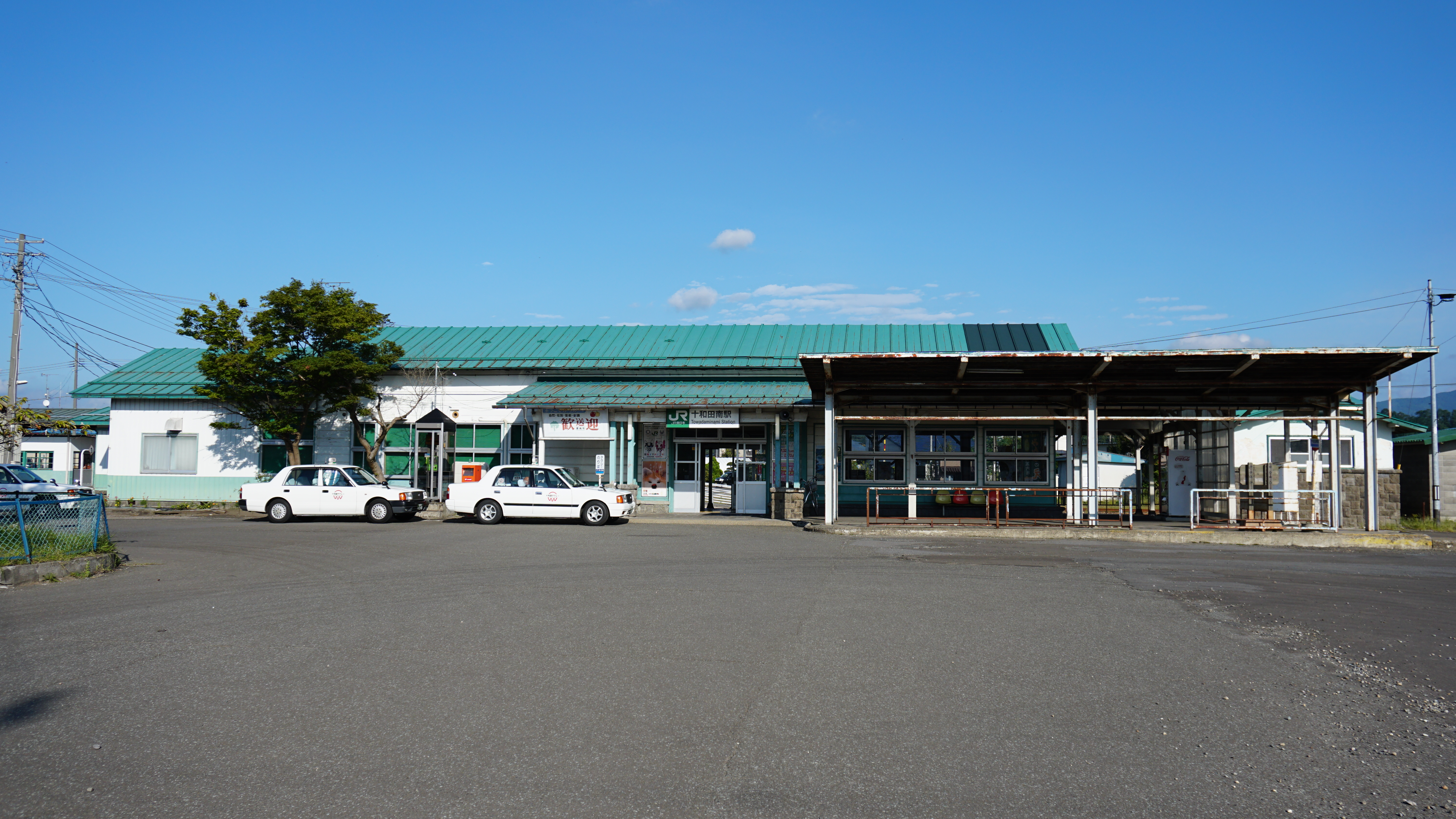
- Towada-Minami Station in September 2018

General information
- Location: Towada-Nishikigi Hamada 100, Kazuno-shi, Akita-ken 018-5336; Japan
- Coordinates: 40°15′19.6″N 140°46′13.3″E
- Operator: JR East
- Line: ■ Hanawa Line
- Distance: 77.7 km from Kōma
- Platforms: 1 island platform
- Tracks: 2

Construction
- Structure type: At grade

Other information
- Status: Unstaffed
- Website: Official website

History
- Opened: July 4, 1920
- Former names: Kemanai Station (to 1957)

Passengers
- FY2018: 162

Services
Preceding station	JR East	Following station
Suehiro towards Ōdate	Hanawa Line	Shibahira towards Morioka
Location
- Location within Akita Prefecture Location within Japan

Towada-Minami Station (十和田南駅, Towada-Minami-eki) is a railway station on the Hanawa Line in the city of Kazuno, Akita Prefecture, Japan. It is operated by the East Japan Railway Company (JR East). The station serves the former town of Kemanai, now part of Kazuno, and functions as a local access point for the surrounding residential and commercial area.

== Lines ==
Towada-Minami Station is served by the Hanawa Line and is located 77.7 kilometres from the official starting point of the line at Kōma Station in Iwate Prefecture. By distance, it lies 99.0 kilometres from Morioka. The neighbouring stations on the Hanawa Line are Shibahira Station to the east (towards Morioka) and Suehiro Station to the west (towards Ōdate).

== Station layout ==
Towada-Minami is a ground-level station with a single island platform serving two tracks, allowing trains to pass and cross. The station is built as a switchback, all trains must reverse direction within the station, and this requires a brief stop to change the operating direction. The switchback layout reflects earlier plans to extend the line from this point toward Kosaka, which were never carried out.

The station building is on the north side of the tracks and is connected to the island platform by a level crossing. The traditional wooden station building dates from the prewar period and has been repeatedly modernised but retains the appearance of a rural local-line station.

Towada-Minami is under the control of the JR East Morioka General Management Centre (based at Morioka Station). It became an unstaffed station on 1 April 2024, after the closure of its Midori no Madoguchi ticket system on 31 March 2024. Prior to this, it was a consignment station, with ticketing and passenger services contracted to JR East Tohoku General Service. In October 2024, JR East introduced the “Ekinet Q Ticket” ticketless service for the station.

Historically, the station had a kiosk (including a stand-up soba shop) and automatic ticket machines, but these facilities were gradually withdrawn in the 2000s and 2010s.

=== Platforms ===
1	■ Hanawa Line	for Yuze-Onsen and Morioka
2	■ Hanawa Line	for Ōtaki-Onsen and Ōdate

== History ==
Towada-Minami Station was opened on July 4, 1920, as Kemanai Station (毛馬内駅) on the privately owned Akita Railways, serving the village of Nishikigi, Akita. The line was nationalized on June 1, 1934, becoming part of the Japanese Government Railways (JGR) system. The JGR became the Japan National Railways (JNR) after World War II. The station was renamed to its present name on June 1, 1957. The station was absorbed into the JR East network upon the privatization of the JNR on April 1, 1987.

== Passenger statistics ==
In fiscal 2018, the station was used by an average of 162 passengers daily (boarding only). In fiscal 2022, the station was used by an average of 120 passengers daily (boarding only).

== Surrounding area ==
- National Route 103
- National Route 282
- Tohoku Expressway – Towada Interchange

== See also ==
- List of railway stations in Japan
