= Yokoma Station =

Railway station in Hachimantai, Iwate Prefecture, Japan

Yokoma Station 横間駅
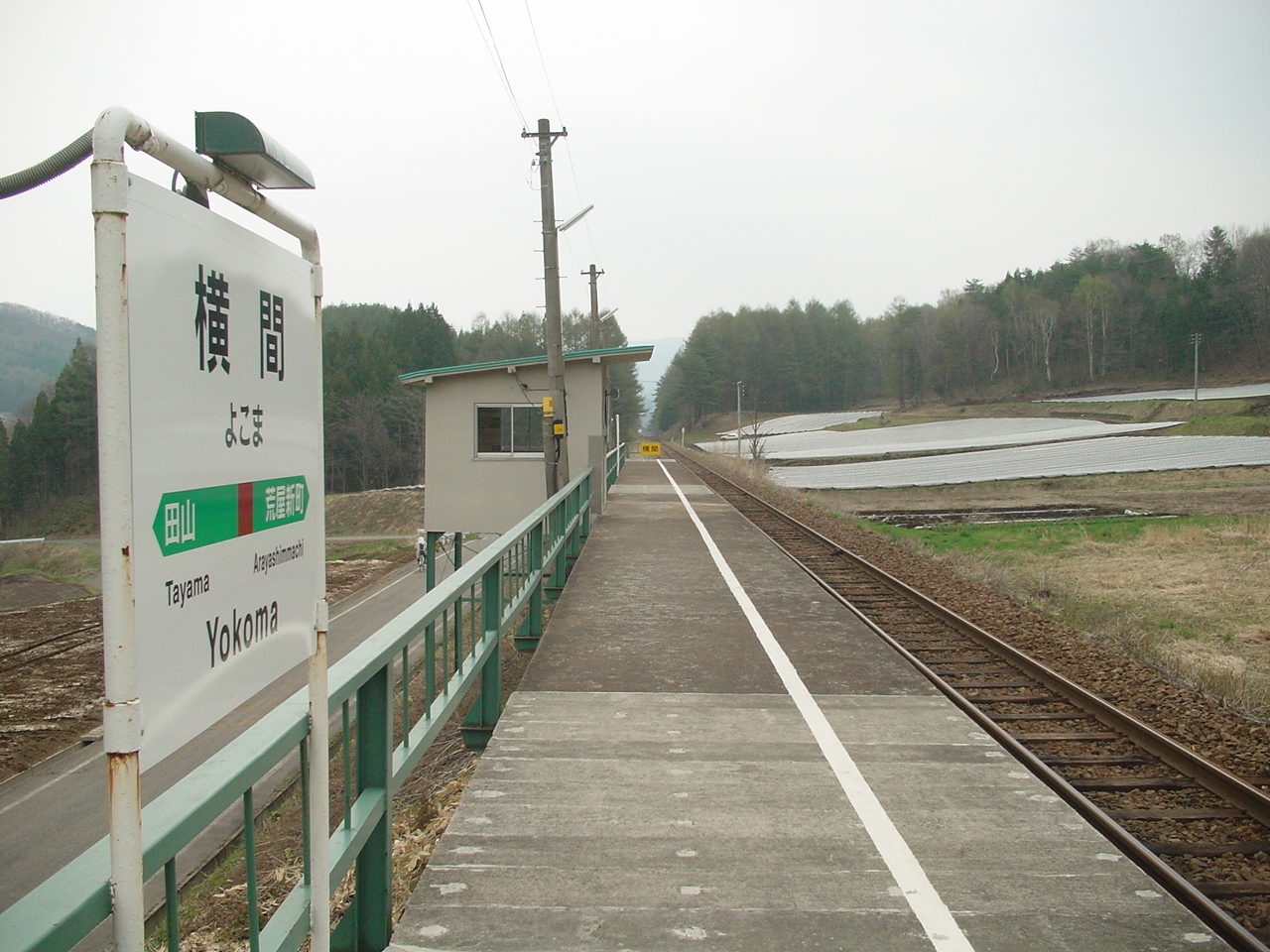
- Yokoma Station in May 2007

General information
- Location: 104 Utsutanai, Hachimantai-shi, Iwate-ken 028-7536; Japan
- Coordinates: 40°6′27.3″N 141°1′36.8″E
- Operator: JR East
- Line: ■ Hanawa Line
- Distance: 40.3 km from Kōma
- Platforms: 1 side platform
- Tracks: 1

Construction
- Structure type: At grade

Other information
- Status: Unstaffed
- Website: Official website

History
- Opened: November 1, 1966

Services
Preceding station	JR East	Following station
Tayama towards Ōdate	Hanawa Line	Araya-Shinmachi towards Morioka
Location
- Location within Japan

Yokoma Station (横間駅, Yokoma-eki) is a JR East railway station on the Hanawa Line in the city of Hachimantai, Iwate Prefecture, Japan.

== Lines ==
Yokoma Station is served by the 106.9 km Hanawa Line, and is located 40.3 kilometers from the starting point of the line at Kōma.

== Station layout ==
Yokoma Station consists of a single ground-level side platform serving a single bi-directional track. There is no station building, but only a small shelter on the platform. The station is unattended.

== History ==
Yokoma Station opened on November 1, 1966, serving the town of Ashiro. The station was absorbed into the JR East network upon the privatization of JNR on April 1, 1987.

== Surrounding area ==
The station is located in a rural area, surrounded by fields. There are no buildings nearby.

== See also ==
- List of railway stations in Japan
