= Kitamori Station =

Railway station in Hachimantai, Iwate Prefecture, Japan

Kitamori Station 北森駅
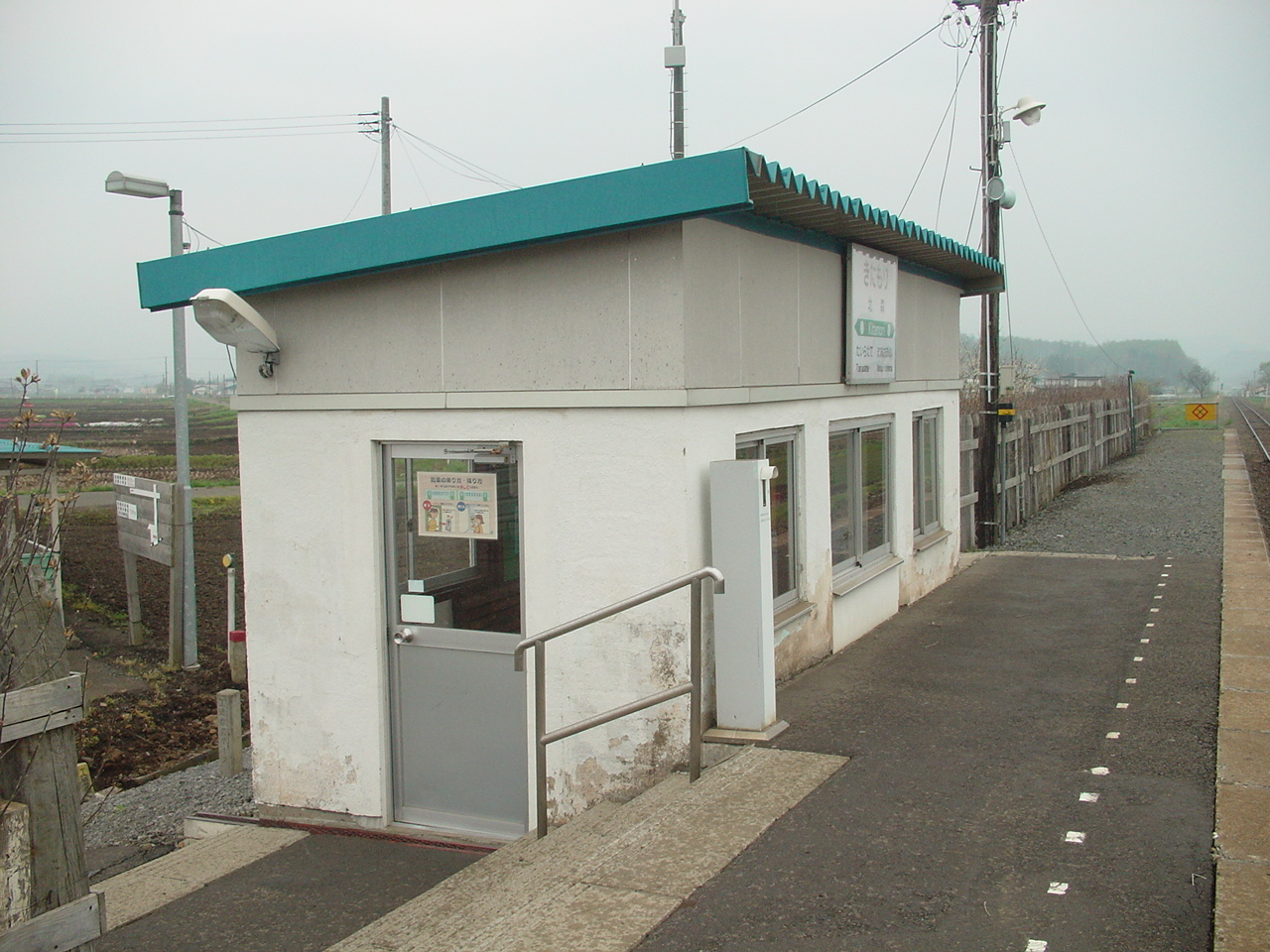
- Kitamori Station in May 2007

General information
- Location: 109, 27 Jiwari, Matsuo, Hachimantai-shi, Iwate-ken; Japan
- Coordinates: 39°57′33″N 141°3′59.7″E
- Operator: JR East
- Line: ■ Hanawa Line
- Distance: 15.6 km from Kōma
- Platforms: 1 side platform
- Tracks: 1

Construction
- Structure type: At grade

Other information
- Status: Unstaffed
- Website: Official website

History
- Opened: April 20, 1961

Services
Preceding station	JR East	Following station
Matsuo-Hachimantai towards Ōdate	Hanawa Line	Tairadate towards Morioka
Location
- Location within Japan

Kitamori Station (北森駅, Kitamori-eki) is an East Japan Railway Company (JR East) railway station on the Hanawa Line in the city of Hachimantai, Iwate Prefecture, Japan.

== Lines ==
Kitamori Station is served by the 106.9 km Hanawa Line, and is located 15.6 kilometers from the starting point of the line at Kōma.

== Station layout ==
Kitamori Station has a single side platform serving a single bi-directional track. The station is unattended.

== History ==
Kitamori Station opened on April 20, 1961 as a passenger station serving the village of Matsuo. The station was absorbed into the JR East network upon the privatization of JNR on April 1, 1987.

== Surrounding area ==
- National Route 282
- Matsuo Post Office

== See also ==
- List of railway stations in Japan
