= Arayashimmachi Station =

Railway station in Hachimantai, Iwate Prefecture, Japan

Arayashimmachi Station 荒屋新町駅
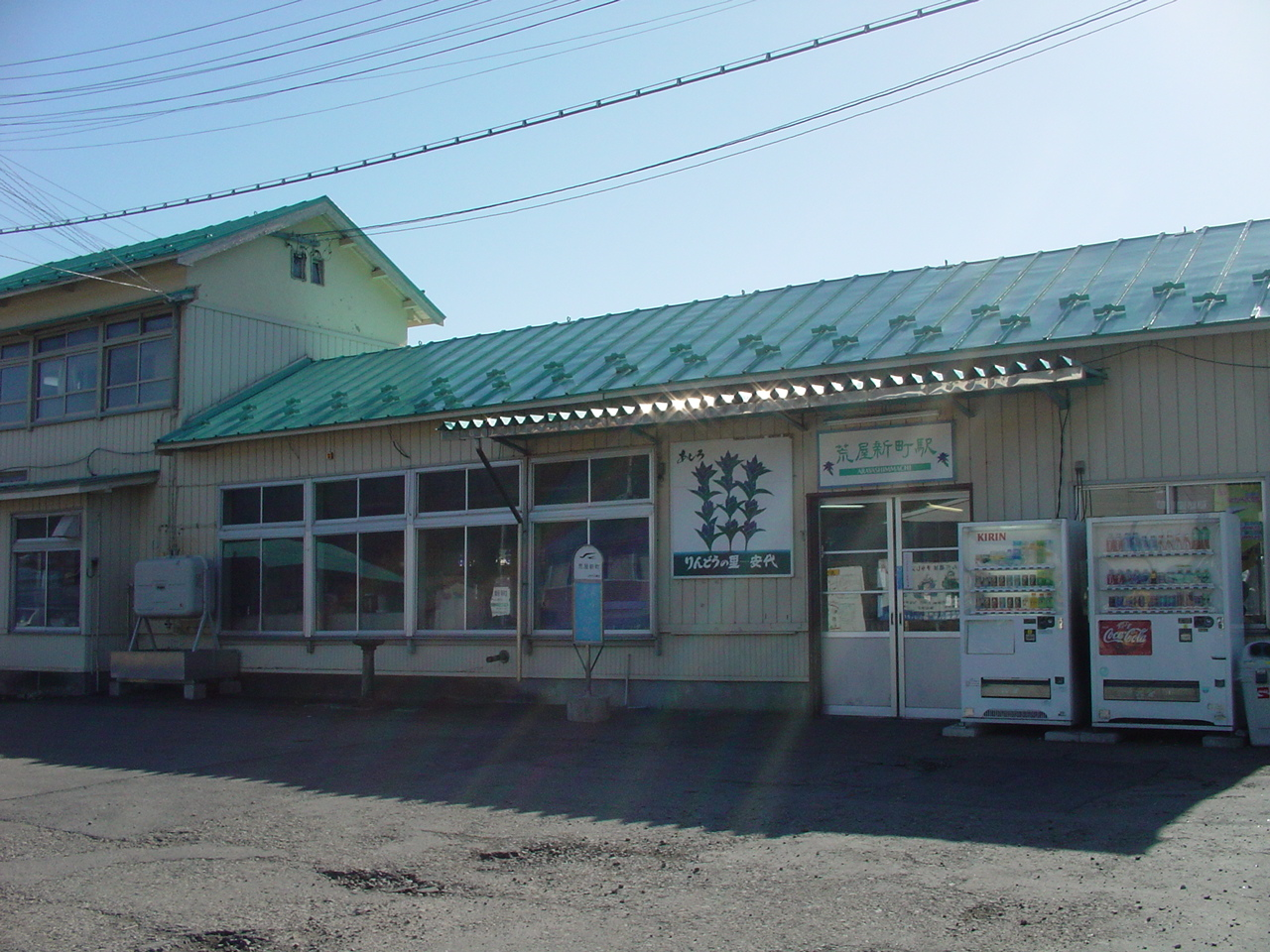
- Arayashimmachi Station in April 2006

General information
- Location: 182-5 Arayashinmachi, Hachimantai-shi, Iwate-ken 028-7534; Japan
- Coordinates: 40°5′52.1″N 141°2′56.9″E
- Operator: JR East
- Line: ■ Hanawa Line
- Distance: 37.6 km from Kōma
- Platforms: 1 island + 1 side platform
- Tracks: 3

Construction
- Structure type: At grade

Other information
- Status: Staffed ( Midori-no-madoguchi)
- Website: Official website

History
- Opened: October 30, 1927

Passengers
- FY2015: 60 daily

Services
Preceding station	JR East	Following station
Yokoma towards Ōdate	Hanawa Line	Koyanohata towards Morioka
Location
- Location within Japan

Arayashimmachi Station (荒屋新町駅, Arayashinmachi-eki) is a railway station on the Hanawa Line in the city of Hachimantai, Iwate Prefecture, Japan, operated by East Japan Railway Company (JR East).

== Lines ==
Arayashimmachi Station is served by the 106.9 km Hanawa Line, and is located 37.6 kilometers from the starting point of the line at Kōma.

== Station layout ==
The station has one side platform and one island platform serving three tracks, connected to the station building by a level crossing. The station has a Midori-no-madoguchi staffed ticket office.

=== Platforms ===
1	■ Hanawa Line	for Kazuno-Hanawa and Ōdate
2	■ Hanawa Line	for Ōbuke and Morioka
3	■ Hanawa Line	Passing loop

== History ==
Arayashimmachi Station opened on October 30, 1927, serving the village of Arasawa. The station was absorbed into the JR East network upon the privatization of JNR on April 1, 1987.

== Passenger statistics ==
In fiscal 2015, the station was used by an average of 60 passengers daily (boarding passengers only).

== Surrounding area ==
- former Ashiro village hall
- Hachimantai City Museum
- Arai Post Office

== See also ==
- List of railway stations in Japan
