= Hanawa Line =

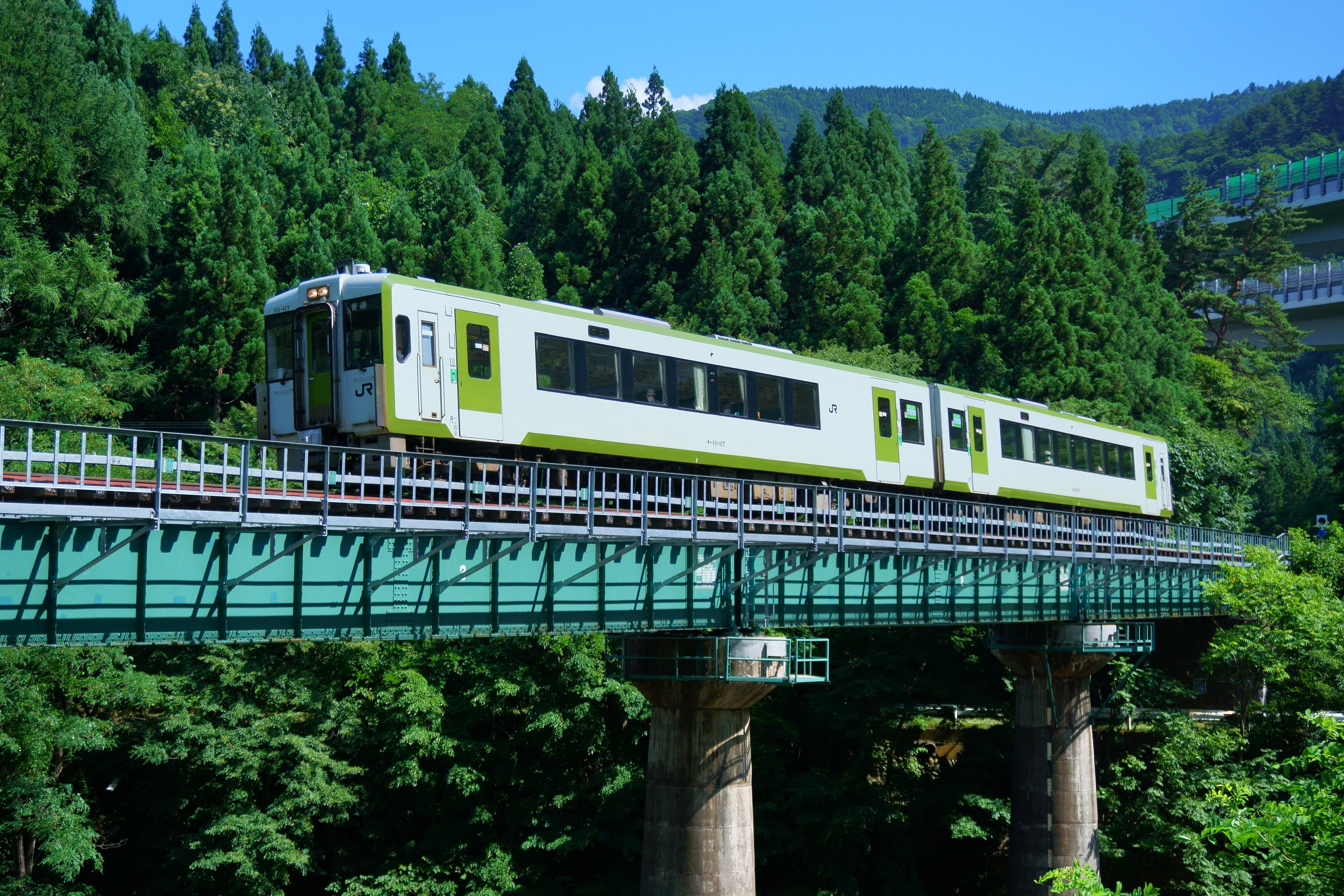
- Train on the Hanawa Line in July 2021

Overview
- Native name: 花輪線
- Owner: JR East
- Locale: Iwate and Akita prefectures
- Termini: Koma; Ōdate
- Stations: 27

Service
- Rolling stock: KiHa 110 series

History
- Opened: 1914; 112 years ago

Technical
- Line length: 106.9 km (66.4 mi)
- Num of tracks: 1
- Track gauge: 1,067 mm (3 ft 6 in)
- Operating speed: 85 km/h (53 mph)
Route map
- ♦: seasonal April–November

The Hanawa Line (Japanese: 花輪線, Hepburn: Hanawa-sen) is a 106.9-kilometre (66.4 mi) railway line with 27 stations between Kōma Station in Morioka, Iwate Prefecture, and Ōdate Station in Ōdate, Akita Prefecture. Also known as the Towada-Hachimantai Shikisai Line (十和田八幡平四季彩ライン), the line is operated by East Japan Railway Company (JR East).

== Stations ==
All trains operate as local services, stopping at every station.

At Kōma, all trains continue as a through service to or from Morioka on the Iwate Galaxy Railway Line.

Layout legend
◇, ∨, ∧ - Trains can pass each other at this station
◆ - Trains can pass each other at this switchback station
| - Trains cannot pass each other at this station

| Station | Distance in km (mi) | | Transfers | Layout | Location | |
| Station | Between stations | Total | Transfers | Layout | Location | |
|---|---|---|---|---|---|---|
↑ Through-running to/from Morioka via the Iwate Galaxy Railway Line ↑
| Kōma 好摩 | —N/a | 0.0 (0) | Iwate Galaxy Railway Line (through service) | ∨ | Morioka | Iwate |
| Higashi-Ōbuke 東大更 | 4.9 (3.0) | 4.9 (3.0) | | ｜ | Hachimantai | Iwate |
| Ōbuke 大更 | 4.1 (2.5) | 9.0 (5.6) | | ◇ | Hachimantai | Iwate |
| Tairadate 平館 | 4.7 (2.9) | 13.7 (8.5) | | ｜ | Hachimantai | Iwate |
| Kitamori 北森 | 1.9 (1.2) | 15.6 (9.7) | | ｜ | Hachimantai | Iwate |
| Matsuo-Hachimantai 松尾八幡平 | 2.2 (1.4) | 17.8 (11.1) | | ◇ | Hachimantai | Iwate |
| Appi-Kōgen 安比高原 | 7.2 (4.5) | 25.0 (15.5) | | ｜ | Hachimantai | Iwate |
| Akasakata 赤坂田 | 5.0 (3.1) | 30.0 (18.6) | | ｜ | Hachimantai | Iwate |
| Koyanohata 小屋の畑 | 3.6 (2.2) | 33.6 (20.9) | | ｜ | Hachimantai | Iwate |
| Araya-Shinmachi 荒屋新町 | 4.0 (2.5) | 37.6 (23.4) | | ◇ | Hachimantai | Iwate |
| Yokoma 横間 | 2.7 (1.7) | 40.3 (25.0) | | ｜ | Hachimantai | Iwate |
| Tayama 田山 | 8.8 (5.5) | 49.1 (30.5) | | ｜ | Hachimantai | Iwate |
| Anihata 兄畑 | 6.7 (4.2) | 55.8 (34.7) | | ｜ | Hachimantai | Iwate |
| Yuze-Onsen 湯瀬温泉 | 4.1 (2.5) | 59.9 (37.2) | | ｜ | Kazuno | Akita |
| Hachimantai 八幡平 | 4.3 (2.7) | 64.2 (39.9) | | ｜ | Kazuno | Akita |
| Rikuchū-Ōsato 陸中大里 | 1.9 (1.2) | 66.1 (41.1) | | ｜ | Kazuno | Akita |
| Kazuno-Hanawa 鹿角花輪 | 3.6 (2.2) | 69.7 (43.3) | | ◇ | Kazuno | Akita |
| Shibahira 柴平 | 4.7 (2.9) | 74.4 (46.2) | | ｜ | Kazuno | Akita |
| Towada-Minami 十和田南 | 3.3 (2.1) | 77.7 (48.3) | | ◆ | Kazuno | Akita |
| Suehiro 末広 | 4.5 (2.8) | 82.2 (51.1) | | ｜ | Kazuno | Akita |
| Dobukai 土深井 | 2.4 (1.5) | 84.6 (52.6) | | ｜ | Kazuno | Akita |
| Sawajiri 沢尻 | 2.0 (1.2) | 86.6 (53.8) | | ｜ | Ōdate | Akita |
| Jūnisho 十二所 | 3.0 (1.9) | 89.6 (55.7) | | ｜ | Ōdate | Akita |
| Ōtaki-Onsen 大滝温泉 | 2.5 (1.6) | 92.1 (57.2) | | ◇ | Ōdate | Akita |
| Ōgita 扇田 | 6.5 (4.0) | 98.6 (61.3) | | ｜ | Ōdate | Akita |
| Higashi-Ōdate 東大館 | 4.7 (2.9) | 103.3 (64.2) | | ｜ | Ōdate | Akita |
| Ōdate 大館 | 3.6 (2.2) | 106.9 (66.4) | Ōu Main Line | ∧ | Ōdate | Akita |

== Rolling stock ==
The Hanawa Line is operated with KiHa 110 series 2-car diesel multiple unit (DMU) trains.

== History ==
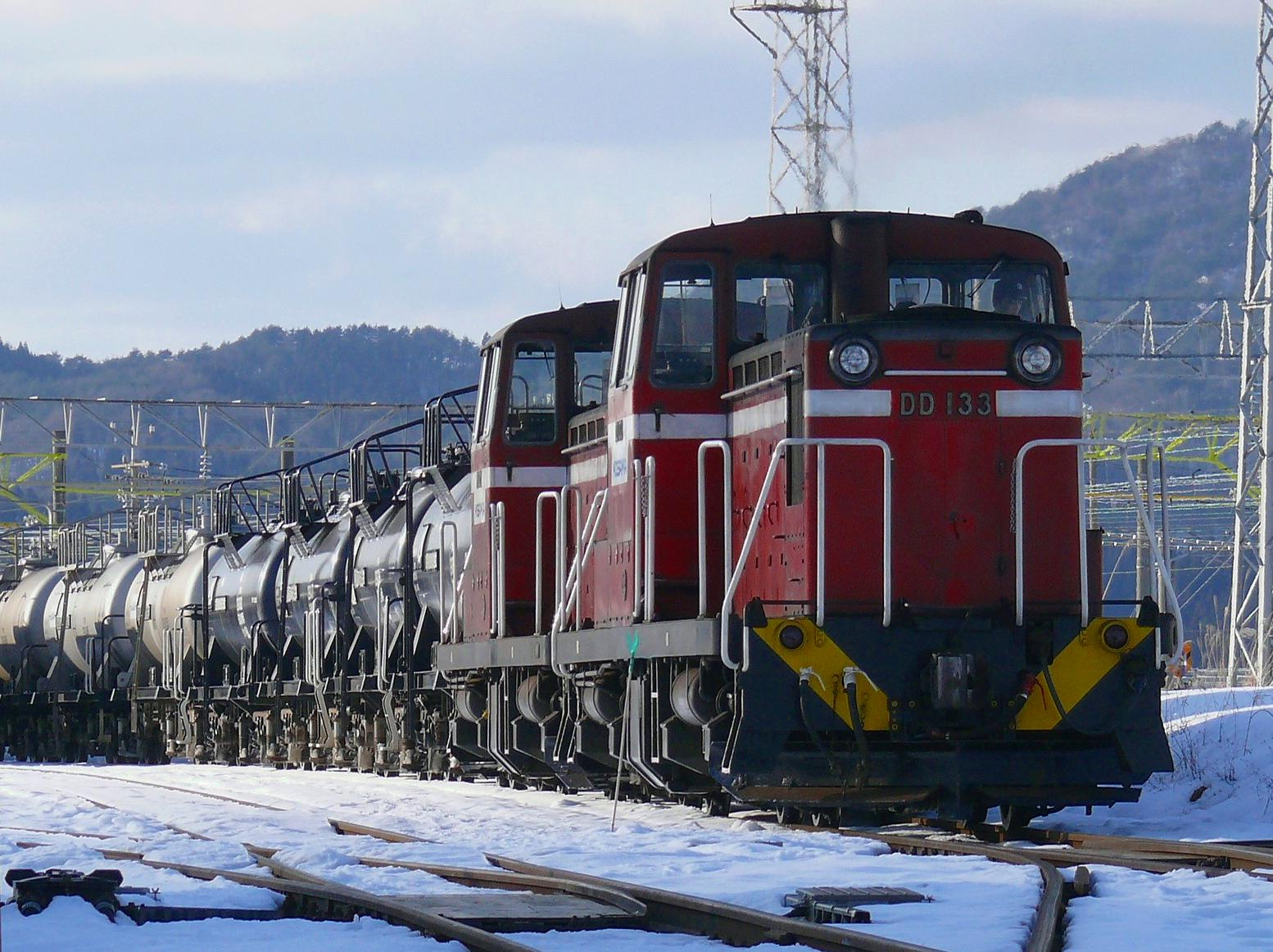
A Kosaka Railway sulphuric acid train in its final year of operation

The Japanese Government Railways (JGR) opened the section between Kōma and Tairadate on 27 August 1922 and extended the line in stages beginning in November 1926, reaching Rikuchū-Ōsato on 17 October 1931.

== See also ==
- List of railway lines in Japan
