= Kosaka Smelting & Refining Kosaka Line =

Kosaka Smelting & Refining Kosaka Railway
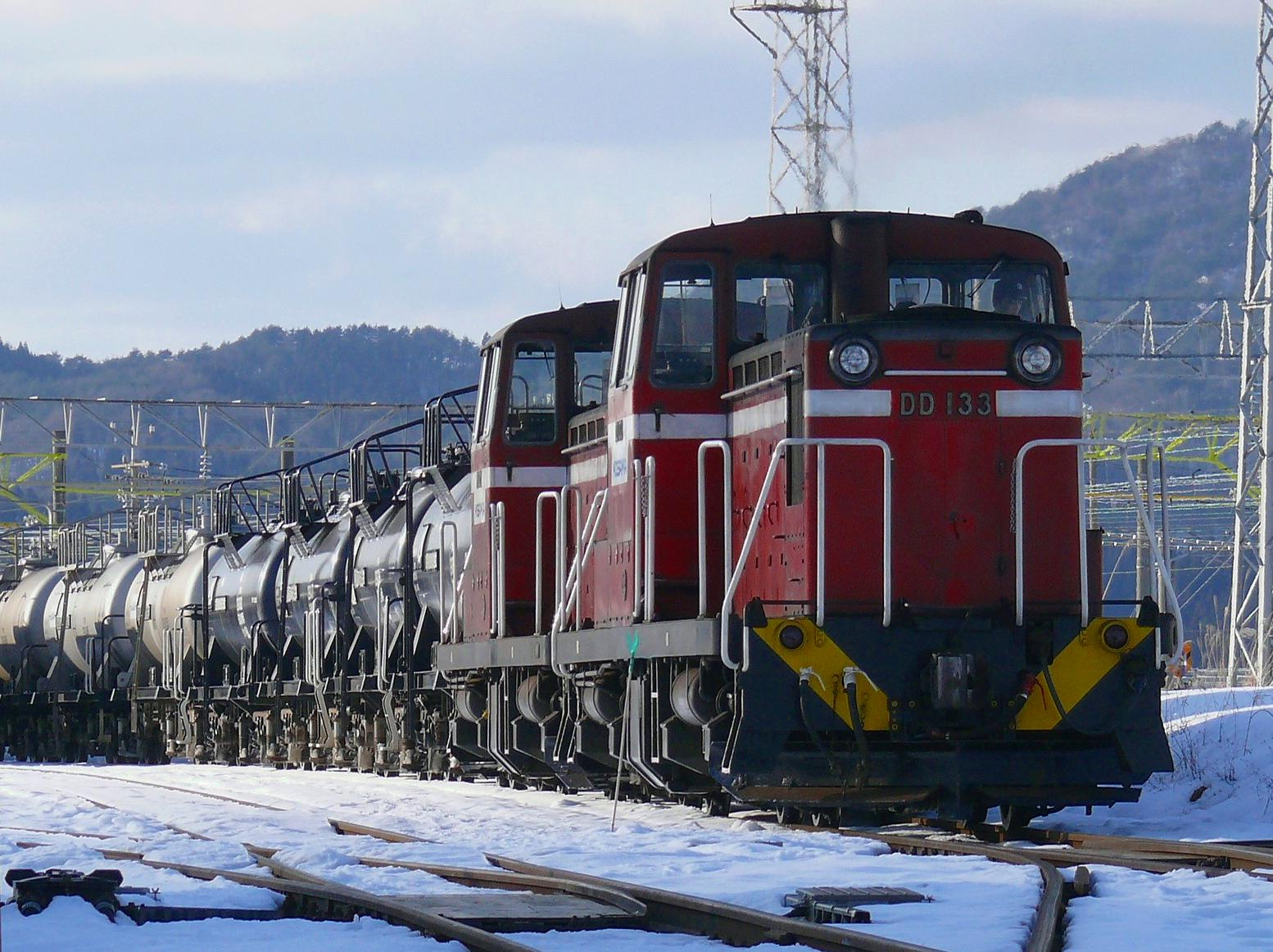
- A pair of Class DD130 diesel locomotives on a sulphuric acid train at Odate, February 2008

Overview
- Native name: 小坂製錬小坂鉄道
- Status: Closed
- Owner: Kosaka Smelting & Refining
- Locale: Akita Prefecture
- Termini: Ōdate; Kosaka

Service
- Type: Heavy rail

History
- Opened: 15 September 1908
- Closed: 1 April 2009

Technical
- Line length: 22.3 km (13.9 mi)
- Number of tracks: Single
- Track gauge: 1,067 mm (3 ft 6 in)
- Minimum radius: 216 m
- Operating speed: 60 km/h (35 mph)

The Kosaka Smelting & Refining Kosaka Railway (小坂製錬小坂鉄道, Kosaka Seiren Kosaka Tetsudō) was a 22.3 km Japanese freight railway line in Akita Prefecture, Japan, operated by Kosaka Smelting & Refining (小坂製錬, Kosaka Seiren). The line operated between Ōdate Station in Ōdate and Kosaka Station in Kosaka. Opened in 1908, passenger services operated until 1994. The line operated as freight-only until suspension in April 2008, followed by a full closure of the line in 2009.

== Rolling stock ==
In later years, the line's locomotive fleet consisted of three Class DD10 centre-cab diesel locomotives (numbered DD11 to DD13) built in 1962, three Class DD130 centre-cab diesel locomotives (numbered DD131 to DD133) built between 1967 and 1968, and one Class DD13 centre-cab diesel locomotive built in 1967 and purchased from the former Katakami Railway in 1988.

Freight trains were hauled by pairs of DD130 diesel locomotives, with triple-heading used on up trains over the steeply-graded section between Kosaka and Shigenai.

== History ==
A 762 mm (2 ft 6 in) gauge steam-operated line was opened from Ōdate to Kosaka on 15 September 1908 to transport copper ore from the Kosaka mine. This became the Kosaka Railway (小坂鉄道) from 7 May 1909. In 1914, the Kosaka Railway purchased the Hanaoka Mining Railway (花岡鉱山専用鉄道).

From 1928, part of the line was electrified using surplus power from the copper mine.

In 1951, the Hanaoka Line was converted to 1,067 mm (3 ft 6 in) gauge, and the Kosaka Line was also regauged to 1,067 mm from 1 October 1962, from which time diesel haulage commenced and passenger and freight services were operated separately.

The Hanaoka Line closed as of 1 April 1985. From 1989, the operating company was renamed Kosaka Smelting & Refining Kosaka Railway (小坂製錬小坂鉄道). Passenger services on the Kosaka Line also ended on 30 September 1994.

Operations on the line were suspended from April 2008 following the discontinuation of sulphuric acid transportation by rail, and the line was formally closed from 1 April 2009.

== Later events ==
On 2 November 2014, the electronics manufacturer Panasonic ran a specially built battery-powered train over a distance of 8.5 km on the line to promote its "Evolta" range of batteries. The lightweight car built of cardboard in conjunction with Akita Prefectural University was powered by 99 D size batteries, and carried 10 elementary school children at a speed of approximately 6 km/h.

== See also ==
- List of railway companies in Japan
- List of railway lines in Japan
