= Kazuno-Hanawa Station =

Railway station in Kazuno, Akita Prefecture, Japan

Kazuno-Hanawa Station 鹿角花輪駅
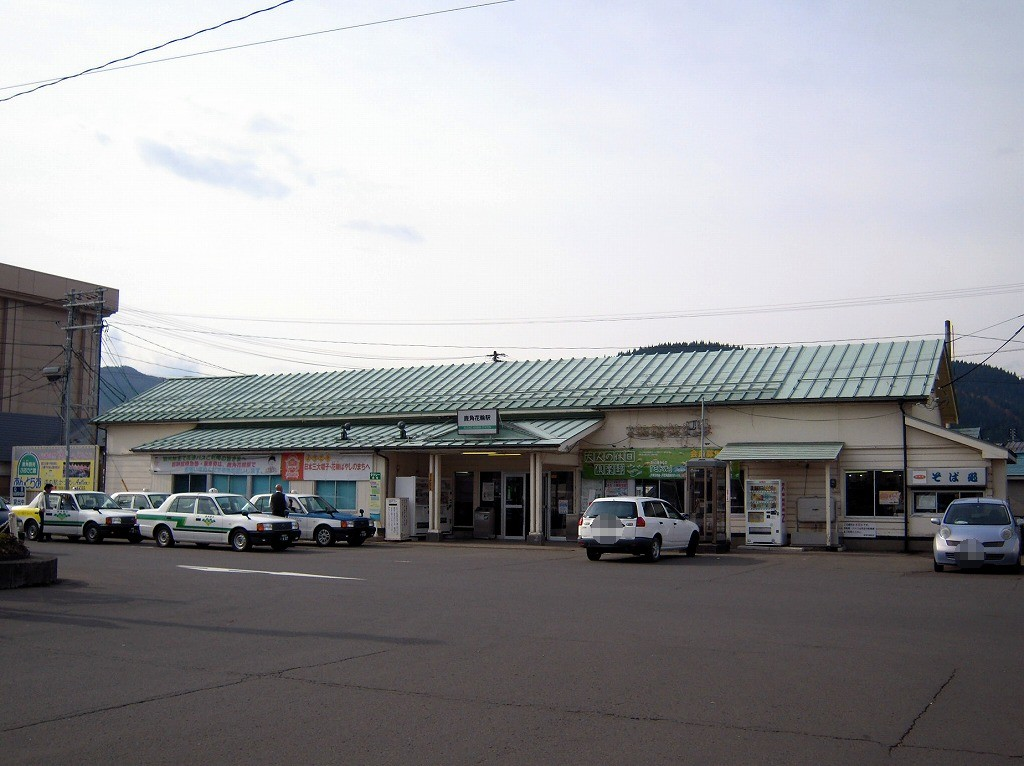
- Kazuno-Hanawa Station in November 2010

General information
- Location: Hanawa Shimonakajima 100, Kazuno-shi, Akita-ken 018-5201; Japan
- Coordinates: 40°11′22.2″N 140°47′8.7″E
- Operator: JR East
- Line: ■ Hanawa Line
- Distance: 69.7 km from Kōma
- Platforms: 1 island platform
- Tracks: 2

Construction
- Structure type: At grade

Other information
- Status: Staffed (Midori no Madoguchi )
- Website: Official website

History
- Opened: October 10, 1923
- Former names: Rikuchū-Hanawa Station (to 1995)

Passengers
- FY2018: 200

Services
Preceding station	JR East	Following station
Shibahira towards Ōdate	Hanawa Line	Rikuchū-Ōsato towards Morioka
Location
- Location within Akita Prefecture Location within Japan

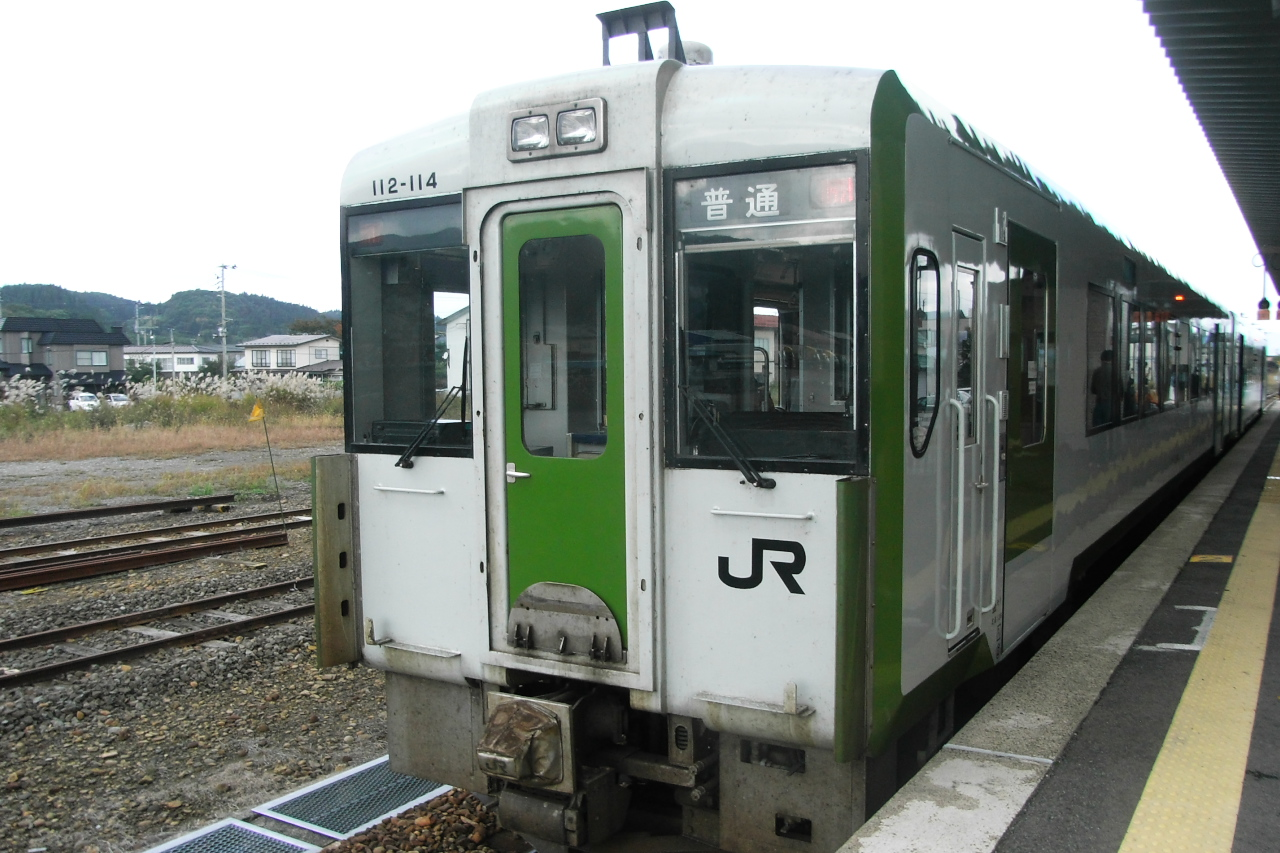
KiHa 112-114 at Kazuno-Hanawa Station

Kazuno-Hanawa Station (鹿角花輪駅, Kazuno-Hanawa-eki) is a JR East railway station located in the city of Kazuno, Akita Prefecture, Japan.

== Lines ==
Kazuno-Hanawa Station is served by the Hanawa Line, and is located 69.7 rail kilometers from the terminus of the line at Kōma Station.

== Station layout ==
Kazuno-Hanawa Station has one island platform serving two tracks. The station has a Midori no Madoguchi staffed ticket office.

=== Platforms ===
1	■ Hanawa Line	for Arayashimmachi and Morioka
2	■ Hanawa Line	for Towada-Minami and Ōdate

== History ==
Kazuno-Hanawa Station was opened for on October 10, 1923 as Rikuchū-Hanawa Station (陸中花輪駅) on the privately owned Akita Railways, serving the town of Hanawa, Akita. The line was nationalized on June 1, 1934, becoming part of the Japanese Government Railways (JGR) system. The JGR became the Japan National Railways (JNR) after World War II. The station was absorbed into the JR East network upon the privatization of the JNR on April 1, 1987. The station was renamed to its present name on December 1, 1995.

== Passenger statistics ==
In fiscal 2018, the station was used by an average of 200 passengers daily (boarding passengers only).

== Bus services ==
- Shūhoku Bus
  - For Lake Towada via Towada-Minami Station and Ōyu-Onsen
  - For Kosaka
  - For Hanawa
- Towada taxi bus
  - For Yonnotai via Ōyu-Onsen
- Highway bus
  - For Morioka Station (Michinoku)
  - For Sendai Station (Sendai Ōdate, reserved seat only)

== Surrounding area ==
- Tohoku Expressway – Kazuno-Hachimantai Interchange
- Osarizawa Mine National Historic Site

== See also ==
- List of railway stations in Japan
