= Japan National Route 282 =

National highway in Japan

National Route 282
- 国道282号
- Japan National Route 282 highlighted in red
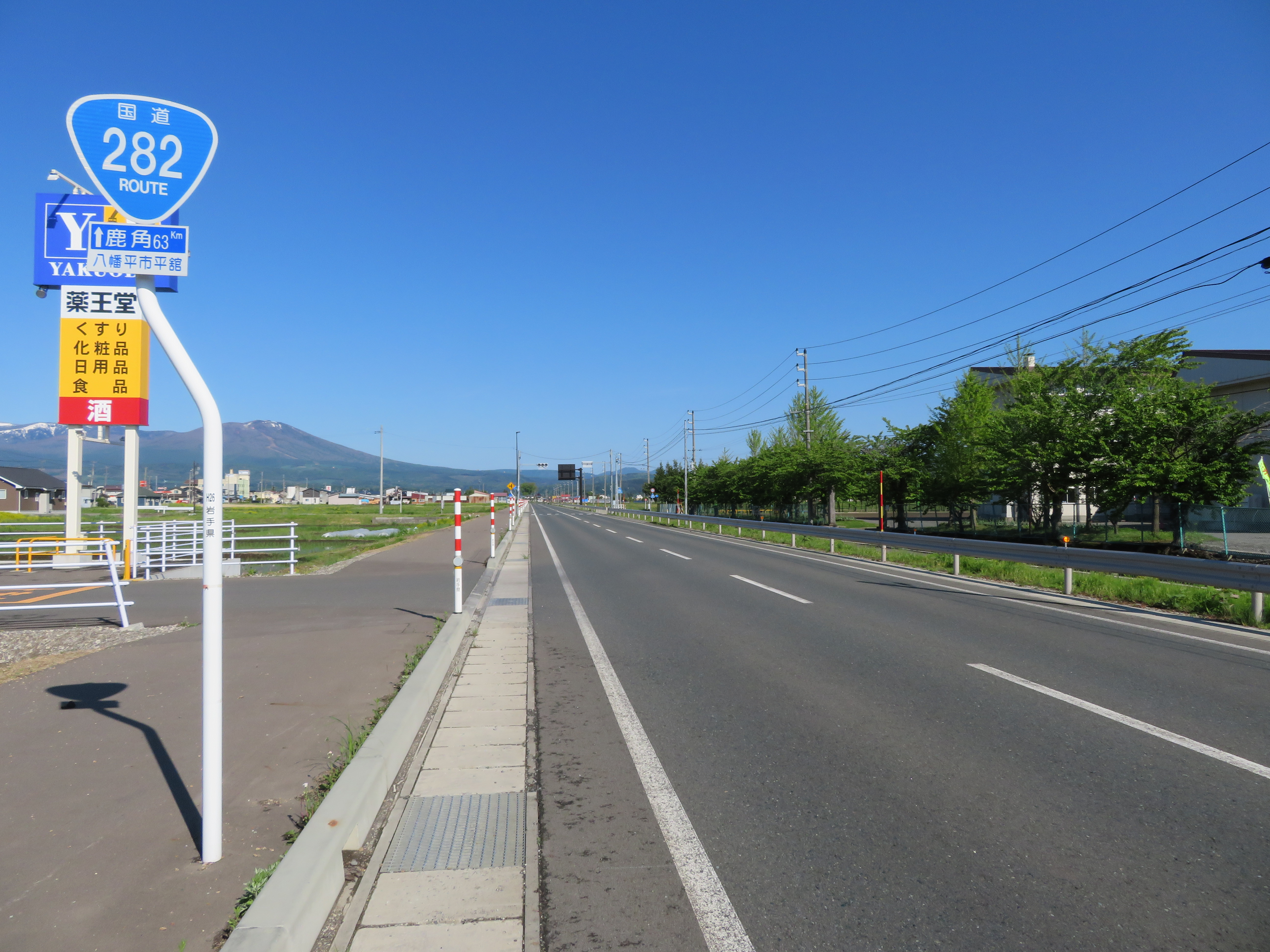

Route information
- Length: 124.4 km (77.3 mi)
- Existed: 1 April 1970–present

Major junctions
- South end: National Route 4 / National Route 281 in Morioka, Iwate
- North end: National Route 7 in Hirakawa, Aomori

Location
- Country: Japan

Highway system
- National highways of Japan; Expressways of Japan
← National Route 281	→ National Route 283

National Route 282 (国道282号, Kokudō Nihyakuhachijūnigō) is a national highway of Japan connecting the cities of Morioka, the capital city of Iwate Prefecture, and Hirakawa in southern Aomori Prefecture. It travels south to north and has a total length of 124.4 kilometers (77.3 mi).

== Route description ==
National Route 282's starting point and southern terminus is located at an intersection along National Route 4, about half of a kilometer east of Iwate University. From there, it runs north concurrently with national routes 4 and 281 and crosses in to the city of Takizawa where it leaves the concurrency. From Takizawa northeast to its northern terminus in Hirakawa, it travels northwest parallel to the Tōhoku Expressway. It crosses briefly through Akita Prefecture before terminating at a junction with National Route 7 in Hirakawa in Aomori Prefecture.

== History ==
National Route 282 was established by the Cabinet of Japan in 1970 between Morioka and Ōdate in Akita Prefecture. It was extended north to its current terminus in Hirakawa in 1982. A bypass signed as National Route 282 running to the east of its original route through Nishine, Iwate was completed on 1 April 2016.

== Gallery ==
Japan National Route 282

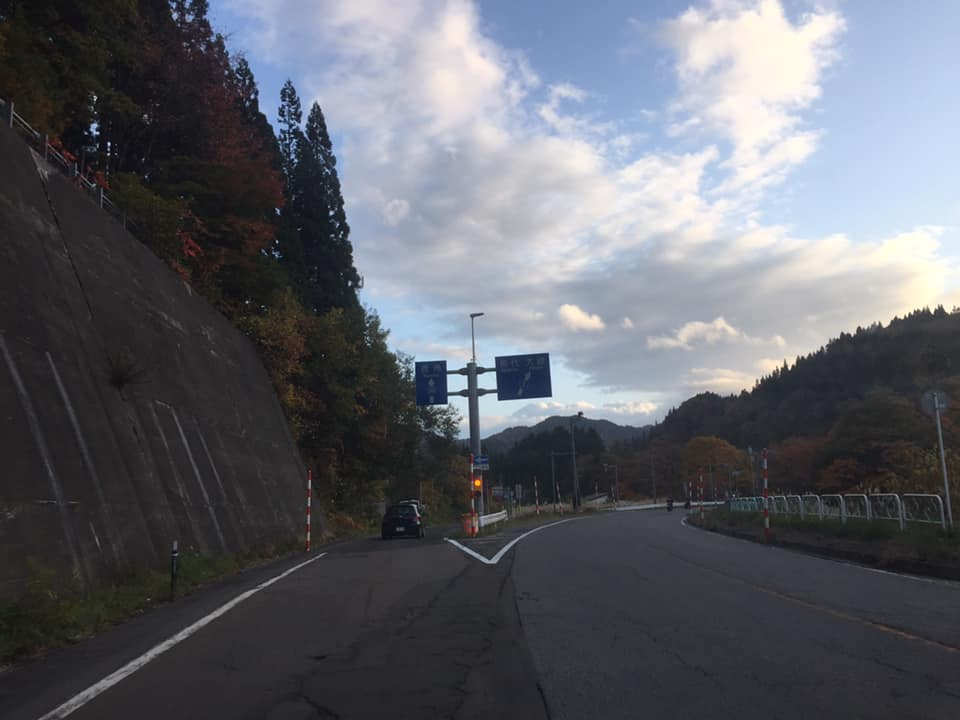
The northern terminus of National Route 282 at National Route 7 in Hirakawa, Aomori

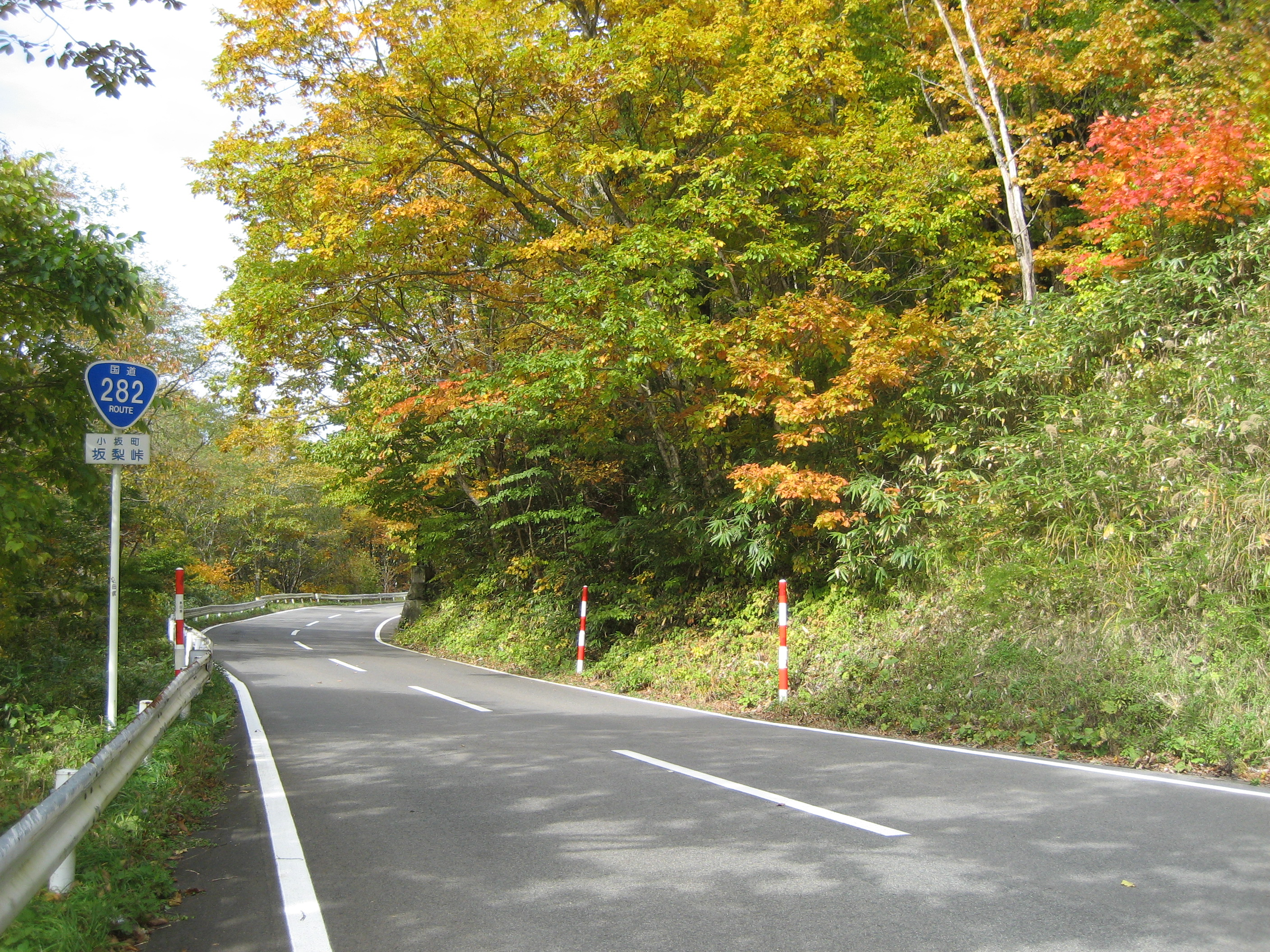
National Route 282 in Kosaka, Akita

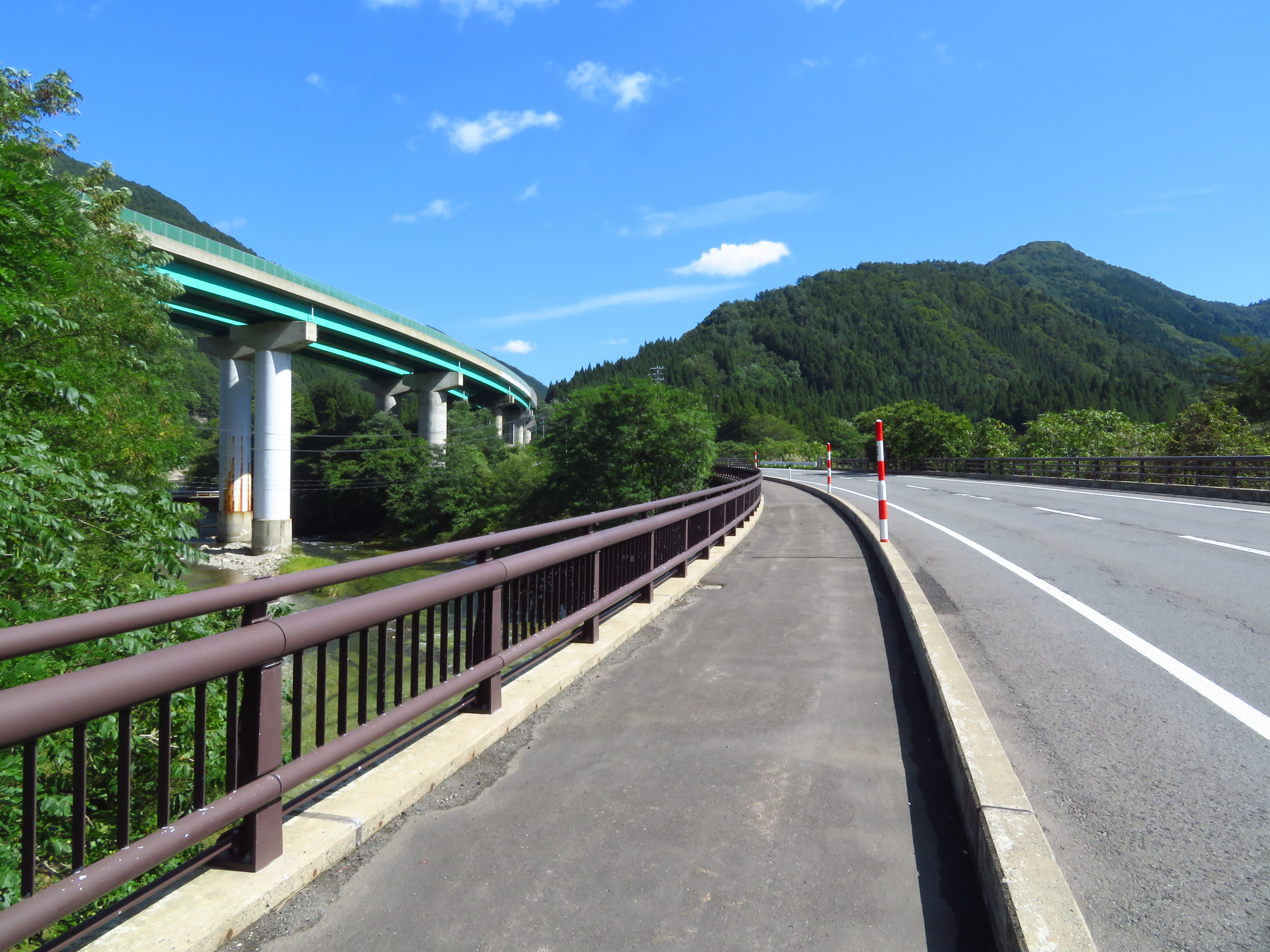
National Route 282 running parallel to the Tōhoku Expressway

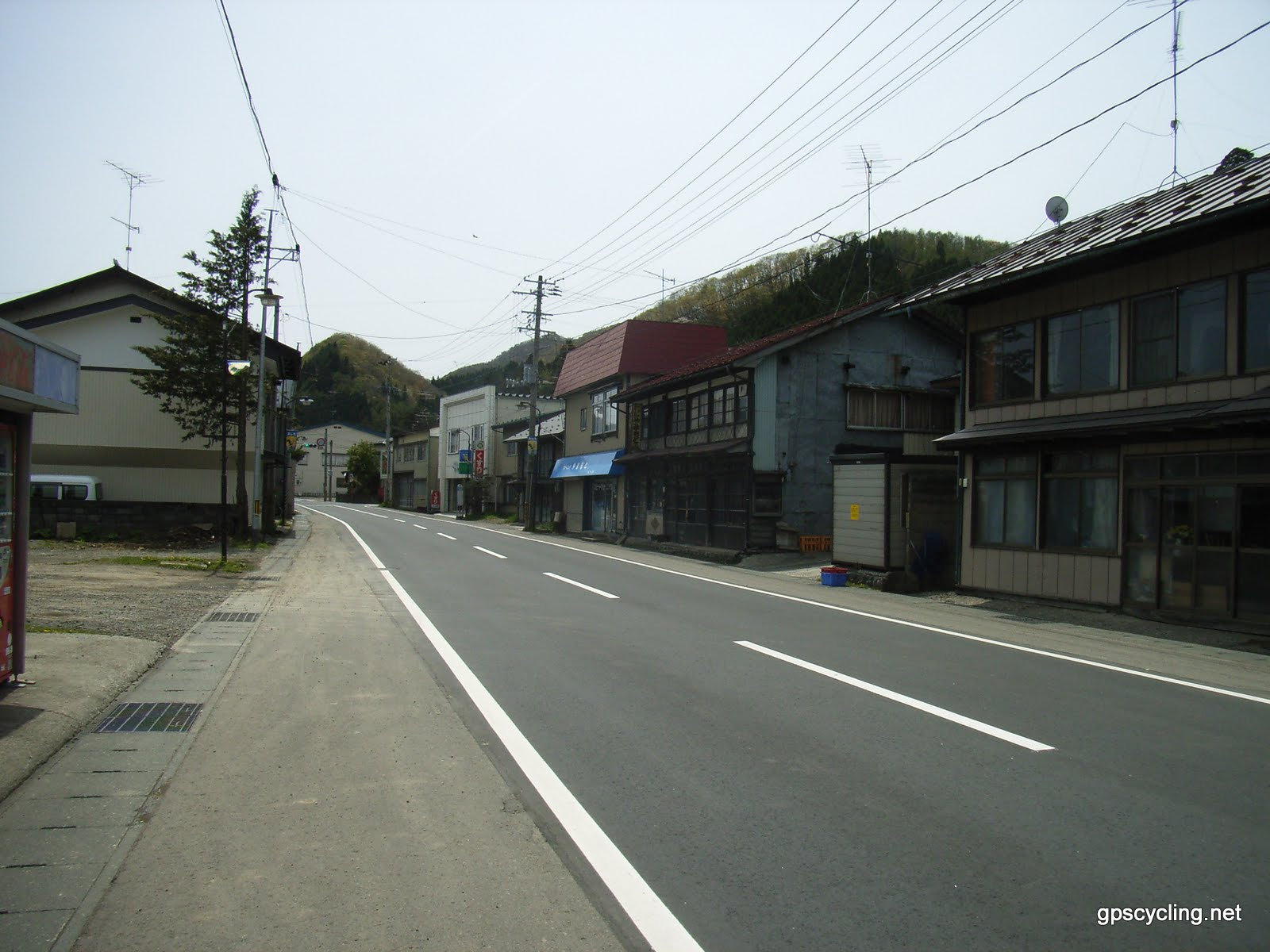
National Route 282 in Hachimantai, Iwate

== Major intersections ==
All junctions listed are at-grade intersections unless noted otherwise.

Prefecture	Location	km	mi	Destinations	Notes
Iwate	Morioka	0.0	0.0	National Route 4 south (Morioka Bypass) – Kitakami, Hanamaki; Unnamed city street – Akita, Tōhoku Expressway, Takamatsunoike Pond	Southern terminus; southern end of unsigned concurrency with national routes 4 and 281; highway continues south as National Route 4
Iwate	Morioka	1.7	1.1	Iwate Prefecture Route 220 south – Prefecture Office, Morioka Station	
Iwate	Takizawa	9.1	5.7	National Route 4 north / National Route 281 east – Ninohe, Tōhoku Expressway, Iwate; Iwate Prefecture Route 16 south – Koiwai	Northern end of unsigned concurrency with national routes 4 and 281, southern end of Iwate Prefecture Route 16 concurrency
Iwate	Takizawa	9.4	5.8	Iwate Prefecture Route 16 east – Takizawa Station	Northern end of Iwate Prefecture Route 16 concurrency
Iwate	Takizawa	9.5	5.9	Iwate Prefecture Route 278 west – Mount Iwate, Amihari	
Iwate	Hachimantai	20.6	12.8	Tōhoku Expressway – Sendai, Aomori, Hachinohe	Nishine Interchange (E4 exit 44)
Iwate	Hachimantai	21.0	13.0	Former National Route 282 north – Hachimantai, Yakehashiri	
Iwate	Hachimantai	25.0	15.5	Iwate Prefecture Route 23 west (former National Route 282) – Hachimantai; Iwate Prefecture Route 257 east – to National Route 4, Iwate, Ninohe, Iwate-Numakunai Station	
Iwate	Hachimantai	28.0	17.4	Iwate Prefecture Route 17 – Tairadate, Iwate, National Route 4	
Iwate	Hachimantai	29.5	18.3	Former National Route 282 south	
Iwate	Hachimantai	32.7	20.3	Iwate Prefecture Route 45 (Kashiwadai-Matsuo route) west – Hachimantai, Matsuo-Hachimantai Station	
Iwate	Hachimantai	53.9	33.5	Tōhoku Expressway – Morioka, Hachinohe, Aomori	Ashiro Interchange (E4 exit 47)
Iwate	Hachimantai	54.5	33.9	Iwate Prefecture Route 6 east – Ninohe, Jōbōji, National Route 4	
Iwate	Hachimantai	65.8	40.9	Iwate Prefecture Route 195 west – Hanawa mine	
Akita	Kazuno	81.1	50.4	National Route 341 south – Lake Tazawa, Hachimantai	Northern terminus of National Route 341
Akita	Kazuno	84.7	52.6	Tōhoku Expressway – Aomori, Morioka, Sendai, Hachinohe Expressway	Kazuno-Hachimantai Interchange (E4 exit 48)
Akita	Kazuno	86.7	53.9	Akita Prefecture Route 66 – Central Hanawa, Osarizawa copper mine	
Akita	Kazuno	88.7	55.1	Akita Prefecture Route 195 east – Hanawa ski area	
Akita	Kazuno	96.4	59.9	National Route 103 / National Route 285 west – to Tōhoku Expressway, Ōdate, Towada, Lake Towada	Eastern terminus of National Route 285
Akita	Kazuno	97.3	60.5	Akita Prefecture Route 313 west	
Akita	Kosaka	103.9	64.6	Akita Prefecture Route 2 (Jukai Line) – to Tōhoku Expressway, Ōdate, Lake Towada	Northern terminus of National Route 341
Aomori	Hirakawa	124.4	77.3	National Route 7 – to Tōhoku Expressway, Ōdate, Aomori, Hirosaki	Northern terminus
1.000 mi = 1.609 km; 1.000 km = 0.621 mi: Concurrency terminus
