= Ōdate Station =

Railway station in Ōdate, Akita Prefecture, Japan

Ōdate Station 大館駅
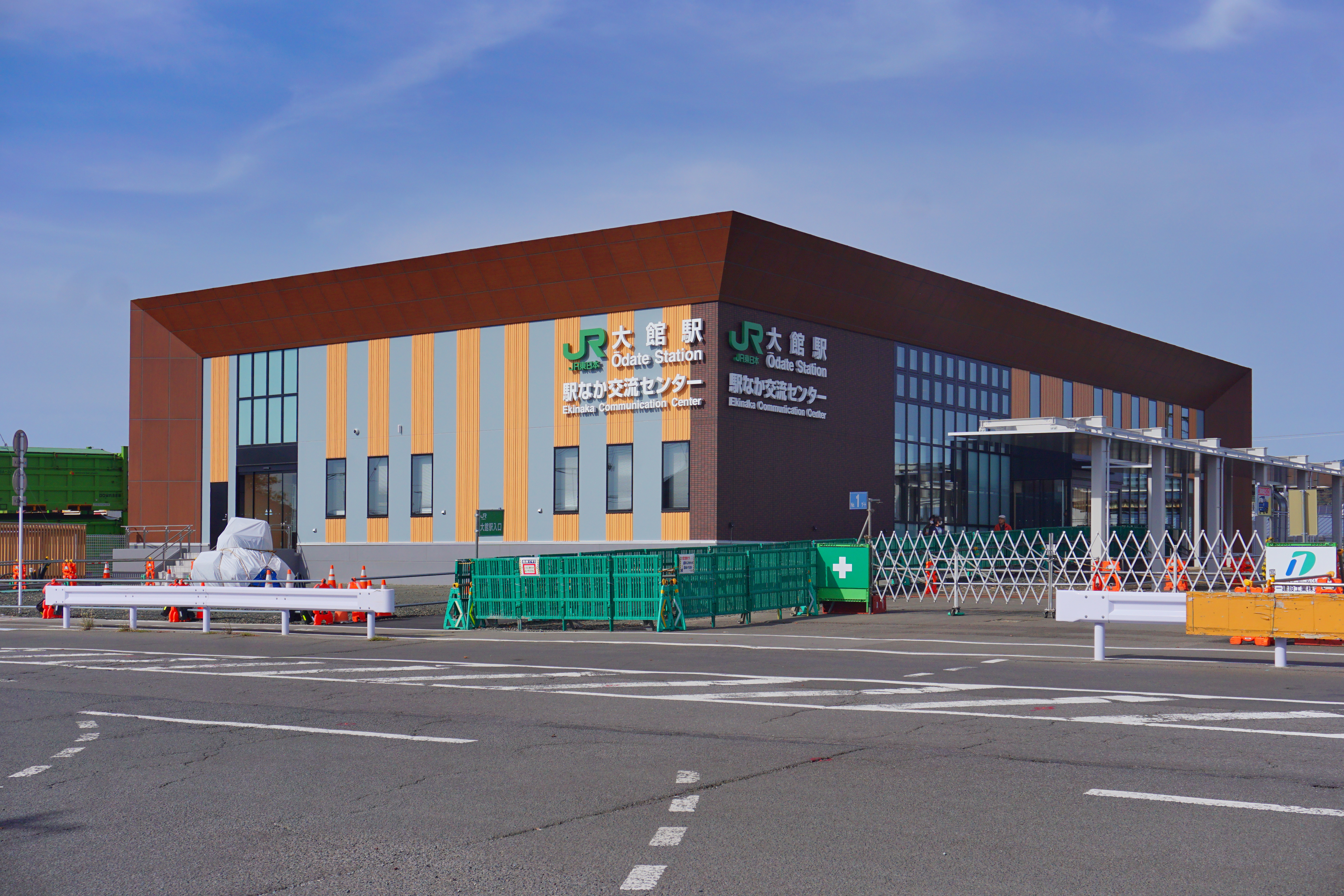
- Ōdate Station in November 2023

General information
- Location: 1-3-1 Onari-chō, Ōdate-shi, Akita-ken 017-0044; Japan
- Coordinates: 40°17′16.8″N 140°33′23.4″E
- Operator: JR East; JR Freight
- Lines: ■ Ōu Main Line; ■ Hanawa Line
- Distance: 402.9 kilometers from Fukushima
- Platforms: 1 side + 1 island platform

Other information
- Status: Staffed (Midori no Madoguchi )
- Website: Official website

History
- Opened: November 15, 1899

Passengers
- FY2018: 906

Services
Preceding station	JR East	Following station
Takanosu towards Akita	Tsugaru	Ikarigaseki towards Aomori
Hayaguchi towards Akita	Ōu Main Line Rapid	Ikarigaseki towards Aomori
Shimokawazoi towards Shinjō	Ōu Main Line Local	Shirasawa towards Aomori
Higashi-Ōdate towards Morioka	Hanawa Line	Terminus
Location
- Location within Akita Prefecture Location within Japan

Ōdate Station (大館駅, Ōdate-eki) is a junction railway station in the city of Ōdate, Akita, Japan, operated by the East Japan Railway Company (JR East). The station also has a freight depot for the Japan Freight Railway Company (JR Freight).

== Lines ==
Ōdate Station is a station on the Ōu Main Line, and is located 402.9 km from the terminus of the line at Fukushima in Fukushima Prefecture. It is also a terminal station on the Hanawa Line, and is located 106.9 km from the opposing terminus of the line at Kōma in Iwate Prefecture. The station formerly also served the now-defunct Kosaka Smelting & Refining Kosaka Line.

== Station layout ==
The station has a single side platform and single island platform serving three tracks, connected to the station building by a footbridge. The station has a Midori no Madoguchi staffed ticket office.

=== Platforms ===
1	■ Ōu Main Line	for Higashi-Noshiro and Akita
2	■ Ōu Main Line	for Hirosaki
3	■ Hanawa Line	for Towada-Minami, Kazuno-Hanawa, and Morioka

== History ==
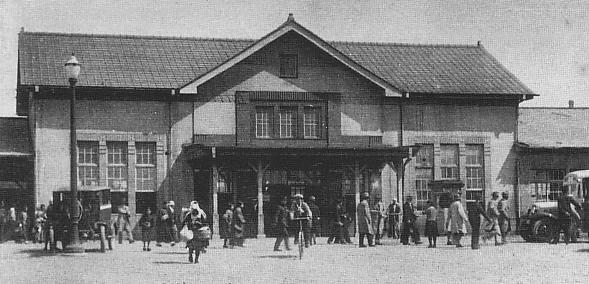
Ōdate Station before World War II

Ōdate Station opened on November 15, 1899, on the Japanese Government Railways (JGR). The privately owned Kosaka Line began operations in 1909, and the privately owned Akita Railway began operations from July 1, 1914. The Hanaoka Line opened on January 26, 1916. The Akita Railway was nationalized on June 1, 1934.

After World War II, the JGR became the Japanese National Railways (JNR). The Hanaoka Line closed on April 1, 1985. The station was absorbed into the JR East network upon the privatization of JNR on April 1, 1987. Kosaka Line passenger operations ceased on October 1, 1994, and freight operations ended on March 12, 2008.

=== Hachikō ===
A statue of Hachikō was first erected in front of the station in July 1935, but was subsequently melted down for its metal content in World War II, and was not restored until November 1986.

== Passenger statistics ==
In fiscal 2018, the station was used by an average of 906 passengers daily (boarding passengers only).

== Surrounding area ==
- Ōdate Station Bus Stop
- Shūhoku Bus Main Office

== See also ==
- List of railway stations in Japan
