= Japan National Route 46 =

National highway in Japan

National Route 46
- 国道46号
- National Route 46 highlighted in red

Route information
- Length: 121.4 km (75.4 mi)
- Existed: 1 April 1963–present

Major junctions
- East end: National Route 4 in Morioka
- Tōhoku Expressway; National Route 341; National Route 105; National Route 13; Akita Expressway
- West end: National Route 7 in Akita

Location
- Country: Japan

Highway system
- National highways of Japan; Expressways of Japan
← National Route 45	→ National Route 47

National Route 46 (国道46号, Kokudō yonjūrokugō) is a national highway of Japan that connects the capital cities of Iwate Prefecture and Akita Prefecture, Morioka and Akita. It has a total length of 121.4 kilometers (75.4 mi).

== Route description ==
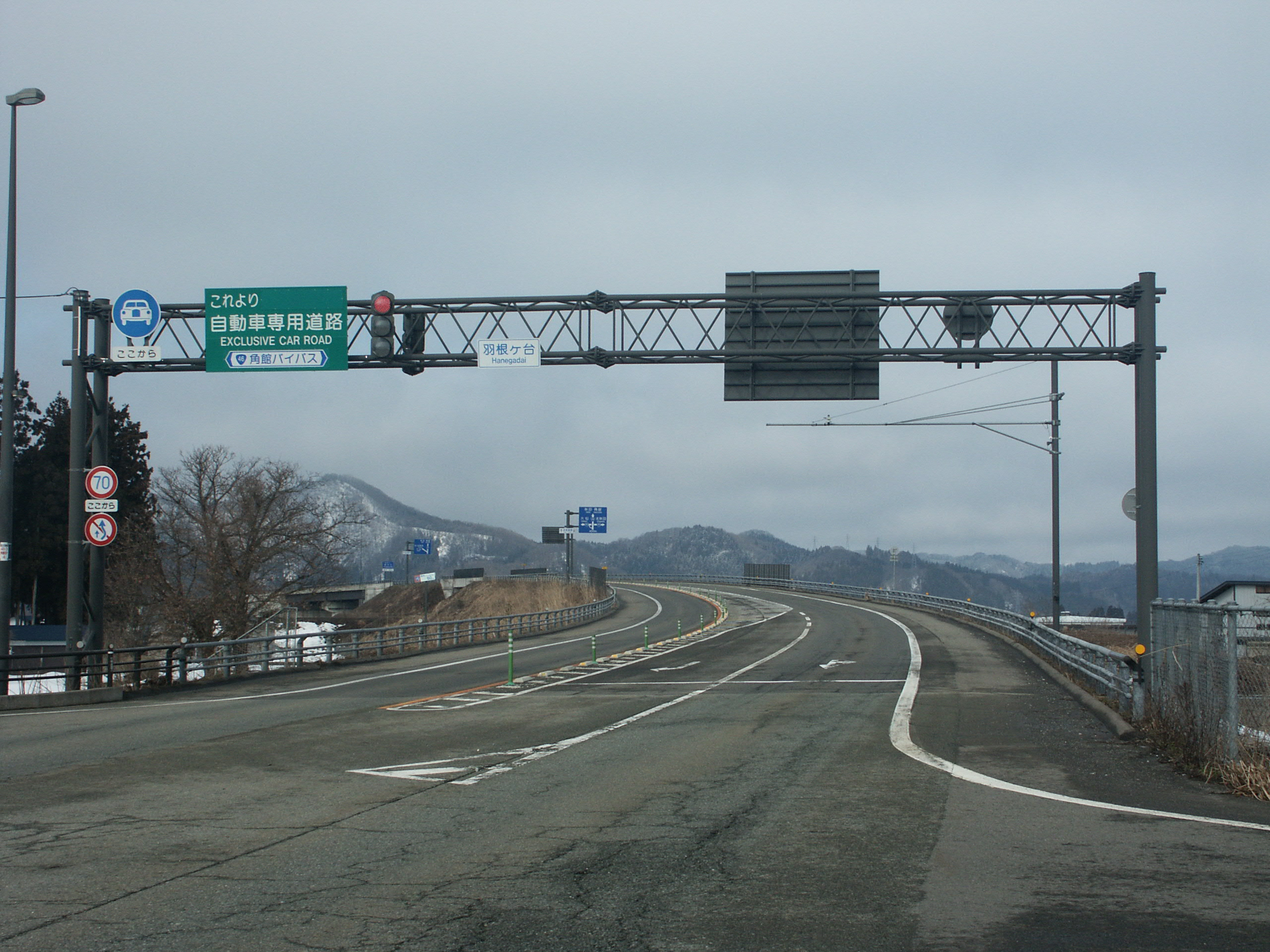
The expressway section of the highway in Semboku

National Route 46 is one of the primary east-west highways in the prefectures of Akita and Iwate and the main route between the cities of Morioka in the Iwate Prefecture's interior plains and the city of Akita on the Sea of Japan coast. It carries traffic across the Ōu Mountains that separate the two cities. The highway's eastern terminus lies at a junction with National Route 4 southeast of central Morioka. It has significant concurrencies with National Route 13 and National Route 341. A section of the highway is built to expressway standards in the city of Semboku. The highway along with National Route 13, meets its western terminus at a junction with National Route 7 to the west of central Akita. The highway has a total length of 121.4 kilometers (75.4 mi).

== History ==
National Route 46 was originally designated on 18 May 1953 as National Route 105, and this was redesignated as National Route 46 when the route was promoted to a primary national highway. The highway was completed in December 1975, but the road over the Ōu Mountains was deemed to be insufficient. An 11.6-kilometer-long (7.2 mi) upgraded section of National Route 46, known as the Sengan Road (仙岩道路, Sengan-dōro), was completed in November 1977 to supplement the inadequate road over the mountains.

== Major intersections ==
All junctions listed are at-grade intersections unless noted otherwise.

Prefecture	Location	km	mi	Destinations	Notes
Iwate	Morioka	0.0	0.0	National Route 4 (Morioka Bypass) – Ninohe, Hanamaki, Central Morioka; Iwate Prefecture Route 36 east – to National Route 106, National Route 396, Tōno, Miyako	Eastern terminus; eastern end of Iwate Prefecture Route 36 concurrency
Iwate	Morioka	1.2	0.75	Iwate Prefecture Route 120 south – Yahaba, Iwate-Iioka Station	Interchange
Iwate	Morioka	2.4	1.5	Iwate Prefecture Route 36 west – to Tōhoku Expressway	Western end of Iwate Prefecture Route 36 concurrency
Iwate	Morioka	5.5	3.4	Unnamed city roads – to National Route 4, Morioka Station	
Iwate	Morioka	6.3	3.9	Iwate Prefecture Route 293 north – Morioka Station	
Iwate	Morioka	7.0	4.3	Iwate Prefecture Route 13 – Hanamaki Onsen, Distribution Center, Morioka Station, Iwate Prefecture Office	
Iwate	Morioka	8.3	5.2	Iwate Prefecture Route 16 (Morioka Loop Route) – Lake Gosho, Morioka Station	
Iwate	Morioka	10.4	6.5	Iwate Prefecture Route 1 east – to National Route 4, Aoyama, Morioka Station, Ninohe	Eastern end of Iwate Prefecture Route 1 concurrency
Iwate	Morioka	11.3	7.0	Tōhoku Expressway – Aomori, Hachinohe, Sendai	Morioka Interchange (E4 exit 42)
Iwate	Takizawa	12.6	7.8	Iwate Prefecture Route 16 (Morioka Loop Route) north – Takizawawakare	Eastern end of Iwate Prefecture Route 16 concurrency
Iwate	Takizawa	13.1	8.1	Iwate Prefecture Route 130 north – Ōkama Station	
Iwate	Takizawa	14.0	8.7	Iwate Prefecture Route 16 (Morioka Loop Route) south – Distribution Center, Lake Gosho	Western end of Iwate Prefecture Route 16 concurrency
Iwate	Morioka	17.6	10.9	Iwate Prefecture Route 131 north – Koiwai; Iwate Prefecture Route 258 south – Tsunagi	
Iwate	Shizukuishi	20.5	12.7	Iwate Prefecture Route 1 west – Yokote, Shizukuishi	Western end of Iwate Prefecture Route 1 concurrency
Iwate	Shizukuishi	23.1	14.4	Iwate Prefecture Route 212 – Amihari, Shizukuishi Station	
Iwate	Shizukuishi	36.8	22.9	Iwate Prefecture Route 266 west – Mount Akita-Komagatake	
Akita	Semboku	52.3	32.5	National Route 341 north – Kazuno, Lake Tazawa, Tamagawa Dam	Eastern end of National Route 341 concurrency
Akita	Semboku	64.5	40.1	Akita Prefecture Route 50 south – Misato, Dakigaeri Gorge	
Akita	Semboku	69.0	42.9	National Route 341 south – to National Route 105, Daisen	Western end of National Route 341 concurrency, eastern end of expressway section
Akita	Semboku	69.9	43.4	National Route 105 – Kitaakita, Daisen	Interchange
Akita	Semboku	71.2	44.2	Akita Prefecture Route 250 – Central Kakunodate	Interchange
Akita	Semboku	73.2	45.5	National Route 341 – Kariwano, Central Kakunodate	Interchange
Akita	Semboku	74.3	46.2	National Route 341 north – Yamazaki	Eastern end of National Route 341 concurrency, western end of expressway section
Akita	Semboku	75.6	47.0	Akita Prefecture Route 253 south – Nagano	
Akita	Daisen	85.3	53.0	Akita Prefecture Route 252 south – Yurihonjō, Kariwano	
Akita	Daisen	94.8	58.9	National Route 13 / National Route 341 south – to Akita Expressway, Yokote, Daisen, Noshiro, Akita	Eastern end of National Route 13 concurrency, western end of National Route 341 concurrency
Akita	Daisen	98.0	60.9	Akita Prefecture Route 28 west – Funaoka, Kyowa ski area	
Akita	Akita	104.5	64.9	Akita Prefecture Route 308 north – Taihei, Iwamisannai	
Akita	Akita	106.5	66.2	Akita Prefecture Route 62 north – Taihei, Tegata; Akita Prefecture Route 175 south – Wada Station	Eastern end of Akita Prefecture Route 62 concurrency
Akita	Akita	107.2	66.6	Akita Prefecture Route 62 south – to Nihonkai-Tōhoku Expressway, Akita Airport, Akita Prefectural Central Park, Yūwa	Western end of Akita Prefecture Route 62 concurrency
Akita	Akita	109.4	68.0	Akita Expressway – Sendai, Yokote, Noshiro, Ōdate, Yokote, Kitakami	Akita-minami Interchange (E7 exit 6)
Akita	Akita	112.9	70.2	Akita Prefecture Route 41 – Goshono New Town, Nibetsu Forest, Tegata	Interchange
Akita	Akita	114.4	71.1	Akita Prefecture Route 9 south – Yūwa, Akita Airport	
Akita	Akita	115.2	71.6	Akita Prefecture Route 61 south – to National Route 7, Yurihonjō, Araya	
Akita	Akita	118.4	73.6	Akita Prefecture Route 28 east – Akita Station	
Akita	Akita	118.9	73.9	Akita Prefecture Route 56 – Sakata, Yurihonjō, Central Akita	
Akita	Akita	121.4	75.4	National Route 7 – Sakata, Yurihonjō, Ōdate, Noshiro; Akita Prefecture Route 26 east – Akita Station, Akita City Hall, Akita Prefecture Office	Western terminus, western end of National Route 13 concurrency
1.000 mi = 1.609 km; 1.000 km = 0.621 mi: Concurrency terminus
