= Takizawa Station =

Railway station in Takizawa, Iwate Prefecture, Japan

Takizawa Station 滝沢駅
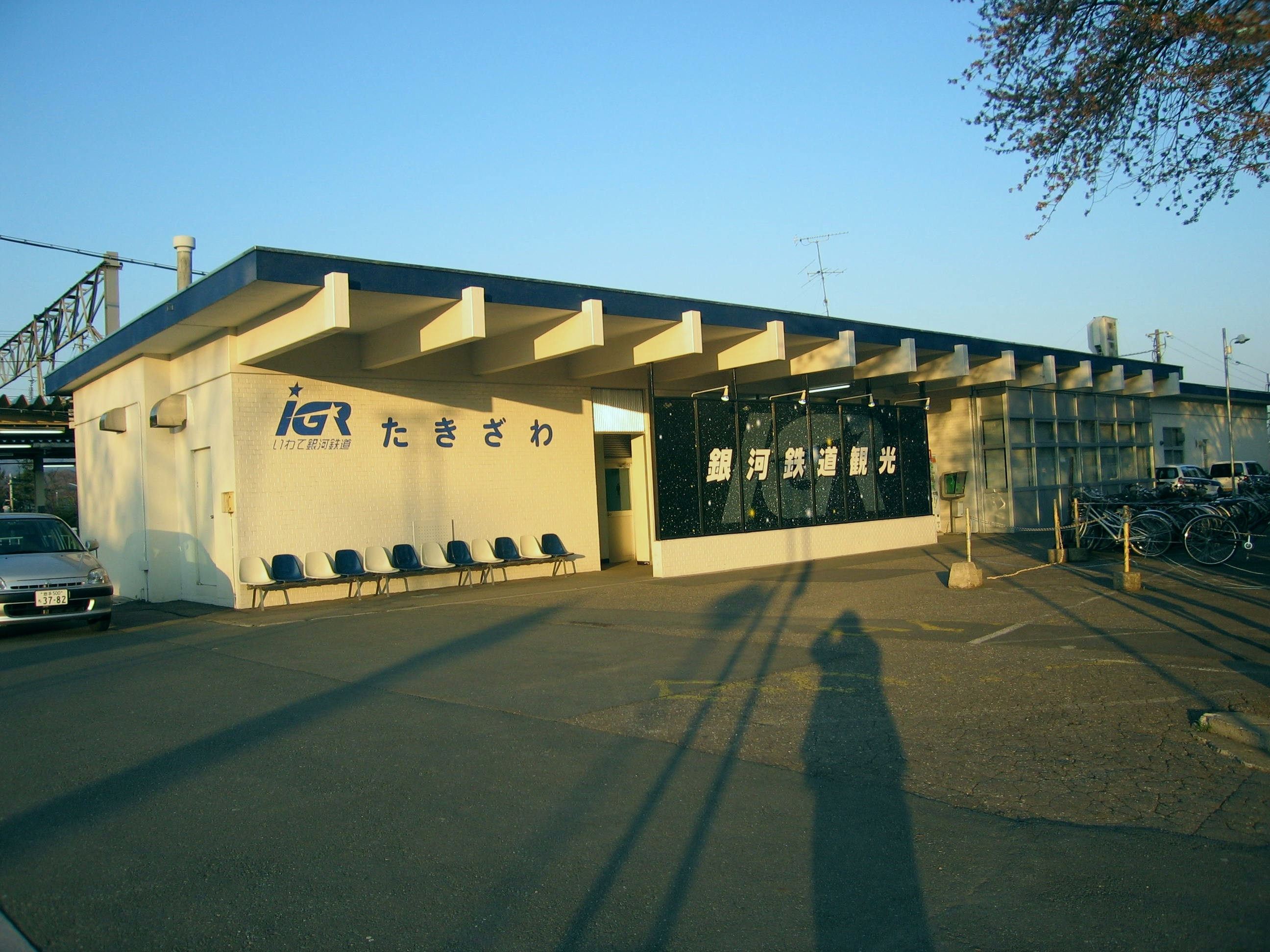
- Takizawa Station in May 2006

General information
- Location: 90 Nozawa, Takizawa-shi, Iwate-ken 020-0622; Japan
- Coordinates: 39°47′56.1″N 141°8′57.8″E
- Operator: Iwate Galaxy Railway Company
- Line: ■ Iwate Ginga Railway Line
- Distance: 12.2 km from Morioka
- Platforms: 1 island + 1 side platform
- Tracks: 3

Construction
- Structure type: At grade

Other information
- Status: Staffed
- Website: Official website

History
- Opened: 21 January 1906

Passengers
- FY2015: 3,095 daily

Services
Preceding station	JR East	Following station
Sugo towards Morioka	Hanawa Line	Shibutami towards Ōdate
Preceding station	Iwate Galaxy Railway	Following station
Sugo towards Morioka	Iwate Galaxy Railway Line	Shibutami towards Metoki
Location
- Location within Japan

Takizawa Station (滝沢駅, Takizawa-eki) is a railway station on the Iwate Ginga Railway Line in the city of Takizawa, Iwate Prefecture, Japan, operated by the third-sector railway operator Iwate Ginga Railway Company.

== Lines ==
Takizawa Station is served by the Iwate Ginga Railway Line, and is located 12.2 kilometers from the starting point of the line at Morioka Station, and 547.5 kilometers from Tokyo Station. Trains of the JR East Hanawa Line, which officially terminates at Kōma, usually continue on to Morioka Station, stopping at all intermediate stations, including Takisawa Station.

== Station layout ==
Takizawa Station has one island platform and one side platform serving three tracks, connected to the station building by a footbridge. The station is staffed.

A special fenced area for rail enthusiasts and photographers, called "Takizawa Station Train Spotters", was set up at the south end of platform 2/3 on 14 October 2017.

=== Platforms ===
1	■ Iwate Ginga Railway Line	for Iwate-Numakunai, Ninohe, and Hachinohe
1	■ Hanawa Line	for Ōbuke, Araya-Shinmachi, and Kazuno-Hanawa
2	■ Iwate Ginga Railway Line	for Iwate-Numakunai, Ninohe, and Hachinohe for Morioka
3	■ Iwate Ginga Railway Line	for Morioka

== History ==
Takizawa Station opened on 21 January 1906. The station building was rebuilt in September 1967. The station was absorbed into the JR East network upon the privatization of the Japanese National Railways (JNR) on 1 April 1987, and was transferred to the Iwate Ginga Railway on 1 September 2002.

== Passenger statistics ==
In fiscal 2015, the station was used by an average of 3,095 passengers daily.

== Surrounding area ==
- Iwate Prefectural University
- Morioka University

== See also ==
- List of railway stations in Japan
