= Takizawa =

Takizawa 滝沢市
- City
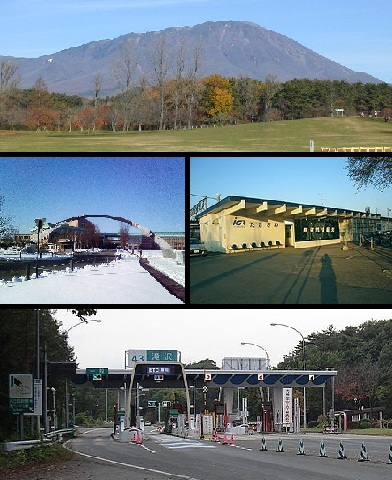
- upper: Mount Iwate, upper-middle: Iwate Prefectural University lower-middle: Takisawa Station; Takizawa C

- Flag Emblem

- Location of Takizawa in Iwate Prefecture

- Coordinates: 39°44′4.9″N 141°4′37.4″E
- Country: Japan
- Region: Tōhoku
- Prefecture: Iwate

Area
  - Total: 182.46 km^{2} (70.45 sq mi)

Population (March 31, 2020)
  - Total: 55,325
  - Density: 303.22/km^{2} (785.33/sq mi)
- Time zone: UTC+9 (Japan Standard Time)
- Tree: Sakura
- Flower: Mountain Lily
- Bird: Common cuckoo
- Phone number: 019-684-2111
- Address: 55, Nakaukai, Takizawa-shi, Iwate-ken 020-0692
- Website: Official website

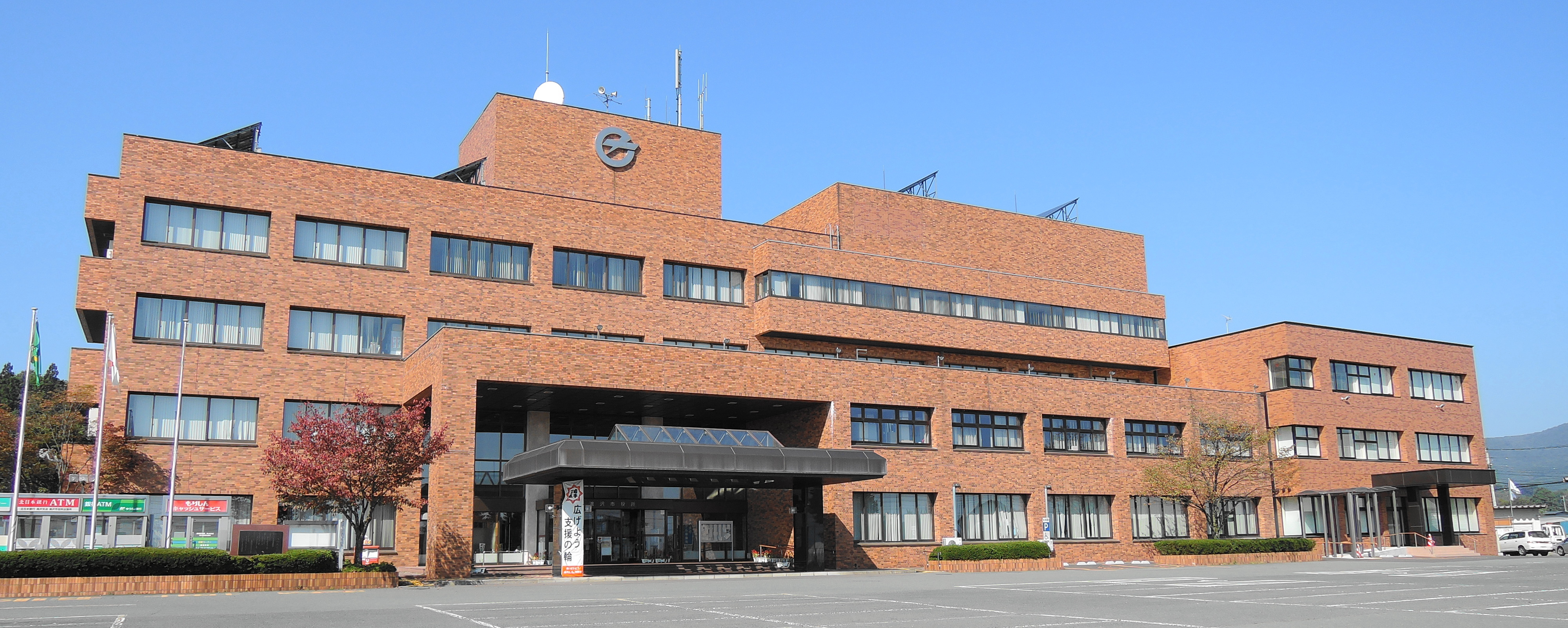
Takizawa City Hall

Takizawa (滝沢市, Takizawa-shi) is a city located in Iwate Prefecture, Japan. As of 31 March 2020, the city had an estimated population of 55,325 in 23,270 households, and a population density of 300 persons per km^{2}. The total area of the city is 182.46 square kilometres (70.45 sq mi).

== Geography ==
Takizawa is located in central Iwate Prefecture, bordered to the north and west by the Iwate Mountains, and the Kitakami River to the east and the Shizukuishi River to the south.

=== Neighboring municipalities ===
Iwate Prefecture

- Hachimantai
- Morioka
- Shizukuishi

=== Climate ===
Takizawa has a cold humid continental climate (Köppen Dfa) characterized by mild summers and cold winters with heavy snowfall. The average annual temperature in Takizawa is 9.5 °C. The average annual rainfall is 1386 mm with September as the wettest month and February as the driest month. The temperatures are highest on average in August, at around 23.3 °C, and lowest in January, at around -3.3 °C.

== Demographics ==
Per Japanese census data, the population of Takizawa grew rapidly in the late 20th century and has grown at a slower pace in recent decades.

Historical population
Year	Pop.	±%
1970	12,000	—
1980	25,686	+114.0%
1990	38,108	+48.4%
2000	51,241	+34.5%
2010	53,853	+5.1%
2020	55,579	+3.2%

== History ==
The area of present-day Takizawa was part of ancient Mutsu Province. During the Heian period, it was ruled by the Abe clan. During the Sengoku period, the area came under the control of the Nambu clan during the Edo period, who ruled Morioka Domain under the Tokugawa shogunate.

In the Meiji period, the village of Takizawa was established within Iwate District on April 1, 1889, with the establishment of the modern municipalities system. Takizawa was promoted directly from a village to a city on January 1, 2014.

== Government ==
Takizawa has a mayor-council form of government with a directly elected mayor and a unicameral city legislature of 18 members. Takizawa, together with the town of Shizukuishi, contributes three seats to the Iwate Prefectural legislature. In terms of national politics, the city is part of Iwate 2nd district of the lower house of the Diet of Japan.

== Economy ==
Takizawa is a bedroom community for Morioka, and a center for many institutions of higher education. Agriculture still plays an important role in the local economy, with Takizawa known for its summer watermelon and fall apples.

== Education ==
=== Universities and colleges ===
- Iwate College of Nursing
- Iwate Prefectural University
- Morioka Junior College
- Morioka University

=== Primary and secondary education ===
Takizawa has nine public elementary schools, eight of which are operated by the city government, and one of which is operated by the Morioka city government, although physically located within Takizawa. There are likewise seven public middle schools, six of which are operated by the city government and one of which is operated by the Morioka city government. There are two public high schools operated by the Iwate Prefectural Board of Education. There is also a special education school for the handicapped operated by the prefectural government.

== Transportation ==
=== Railway ===
East Japan Railway Company (JR East) - Tazawako Line

- Ōkama - Koiwai

Iwate Ginga Railway Line

- Sugo - Takizawa

=== Highway ===
- Tōhoku Expressway — Takizawa IC
- National Route 4
- National Route 46
- National Route 281 (unsigned)
- National Route 282

== Local attractions ==
- Chagu Chagu Umakko - Takizawa is famous for its Chagu-Chagu Horse Festival (チャグチャグ馬コ, Chagu-Chagu Umakko) held every June. The festival is designated by the Japanese government to be an Important Cultural Asset. The festival celebrates the horses which once played an important role in the area's agriculture. The festival gets its name from the bells the horses wear during the procession. The sound the bells make, in Japanese, is "chagu-chagu". The festival begins at Chagu-Chagu Shrine which is a large shrine in Takizawa dedicated to horses. After a brief ceremony a long line of colorfully dressed horses ridden mostly by children in traditional dress leave the shrine and go on a 15 km procession that takes them to Hachimangu Shrine in Morioka. In total the trip takes nearly five hours to complete.

== Notable people ==
- Azusa Iwashimizu, professional soccer player
- Ryuji Ito, professional wrestler
- Sayuri Yōko, actress and children's theater company president
- Shiki Kawamura, wushu practitioner
