= Sugo Station =

Railway station in Takizawa, Iwate Prefecture, Japan

Sugo Station 巣子駅
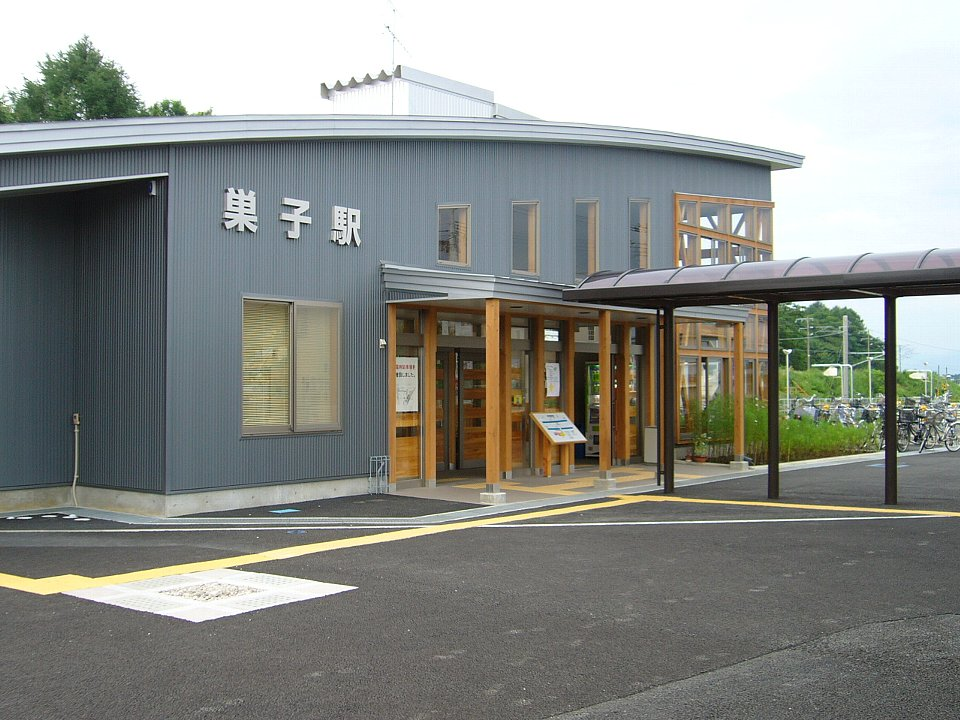
- Sugo Station in August 2006

General information
- Location: 290-8 Sugo, Takizawa-shi, Iwate-ken 020-0611; Japan
- Coordinates: 39°47′1.7″N 141°8′55.3″E
- Operator: Iwate Galaxy Railway Company
- Line: ■ Iwate Ginga Railway Line
- Distance: 10.2 km from Morioka
- Platforms: 2 side platforms
- Tracks: 2
- Connections: Bus stop

Construction
- Structure type: At grade

Other information
- Status: Staffed
- Website: Official website

History
- Opened: 18 March 2006

Passengers
- FY2015: 994 daily

Services
Preceding station	JR East	Following station
Kuriyagawa towards Morioka	Hanawa Line	Takizawa towards Ōdate
Preceding station	Iwate Galaxy Railway	Following station
Kuriyagawa towards Morioka	Iwate Galaxy Railway Line	Takizawa towards Metoki
Location
- Location within Japan

Sugo Station (巣子駅, Sugo-eki) is a railway station in the city of Takizawa, Iwate Prefecture, Japan, operated by the Iwate Ginga Railway.

== Lines ==
Sugo Station is served by the Iwate Ginga Railway Line, and is located 10.2 kilometers from the terminus of the line at Morioka Station and 545.5 kilometers from Tokyo Station. Trains of the Hanawa Line, which officially terminates at Kōma usually continue on to Morioka Station, stopping at all intermediate stations, including Sugo Station.

== Station layout ==
Sugo Station has two opposed side platforms connected to the station building by a footbridge. The platforms are at different elevations. The station is staffed. The ticket machine operates from 5:30 a.m. to the midnight.

=== Platforms ===
1	■ Iwate Ginga Railway Line	for Iwate-Numakunai, Ninohe and Hachinohe
1	■ Hanawa Line	for Ōbuke, Araya-Shinmachi and Kazuno-Hanawa
2	■ Iwate Ginga Railway Line	for Morioka

== History ==
Sugo Station was opened on 18 March 2006.

== Passenger statistics ==
In fiscal 2015, the station was used by an average of 994 passengers daily.

== Surrounding area ==
- Japan National Route 4
