= Aoyama Station =

Aoyama Station (青山駅) is the name of three train stations in Japan:

- Aoyama Station (Aichi)
- Aoyama Station (Iwate)
- Aoyama Station (Niigata)
