= Koiwai Station =

Railway station in Takizawa, Iwate Prefecture, Japan

Koiwai Station 小岩井駅
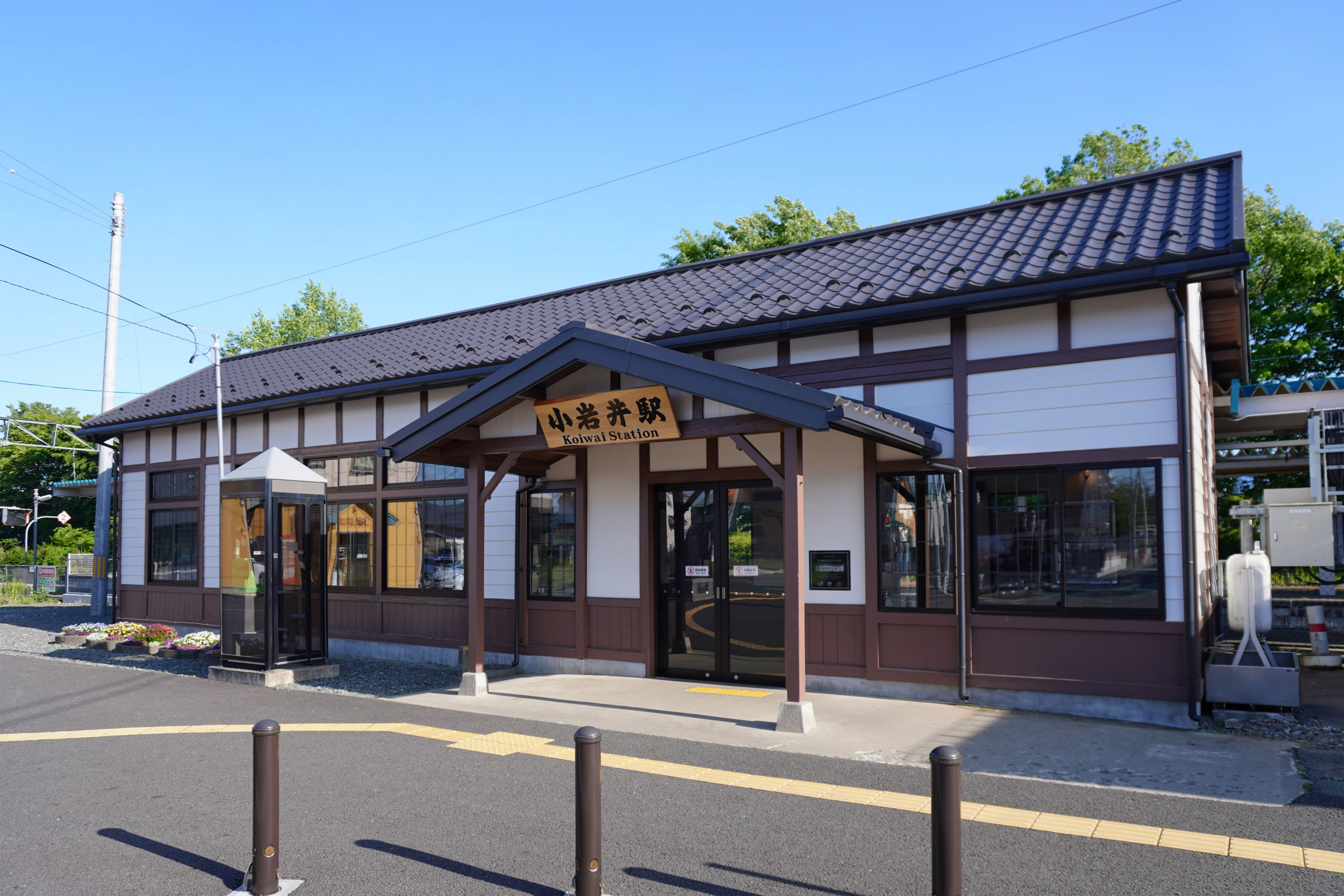
- Koiwai Station in May 2024

General information
- Location: 19-2 Ogamafurin 19-2, Takizawa-shi, Iwate-ken 020-0757; Japan
- Coordinates: 39.7096°N 141.0244°E
- Operator: JR East
- Line: ■ Tazawako Line
- Distance: 10.5 km from Morioka
- Platforms: 2 side platforms
- Tracks: 2

Construction
- Structure type: At grade

Other information
- Status: Unstaffed station
- Website: Official website

History
- Opened: June 25, 1921

Passengers
- FY2015: 496

Services
| Preceding station | JR East | Following station |
|---|---|---|
| Shizukuishi towards Ōmagari | Tazawako Line | Ōkama towards Morioka |
Location
- Location within Japan

Koiwai Station (小岩井駅, Koiwai-eki) is an East Japan Railway Company (JR East) railway station located in the city of Takizawa, Iwate Prefecture, Japan.

== Lines ==
Koiwai Station is served by the Tazawako Line, and is located 10.5 km from the terminus of the line at Morioka Station.

== Station layout ==
Koiwai Station has a two opposed side platforms, connected to the wooden station building by a footbridge. The station is unstaffed.

=== Platforms ===
| 1 | ■ Tazawako Line | for Morioka |
| 2 | ■ Tazawako Line | for Shizukuishi for Ōmagari |

== History ==
Koiwai Station opened on June 25, 1921. The station was absorbed into the JR East network upon the privatization of the JNR on April 1, 1987.

== Passenger statistics ==
In fiscal 2015, the station was used by an average of 496 passengers daily (boarding passengers only).

== Surrounding area ==
- National Route 46
- Koiwai Post Office
- Amihari Onsen
- Iwate College of Nursing
- Tsunagi Onsen

== See also ==
- List of railway stations in Japan
