= Ōkama Station =

Railway station in Takizawa, Iwate Prefecture, Japan

Ōkama Station 大釜駅
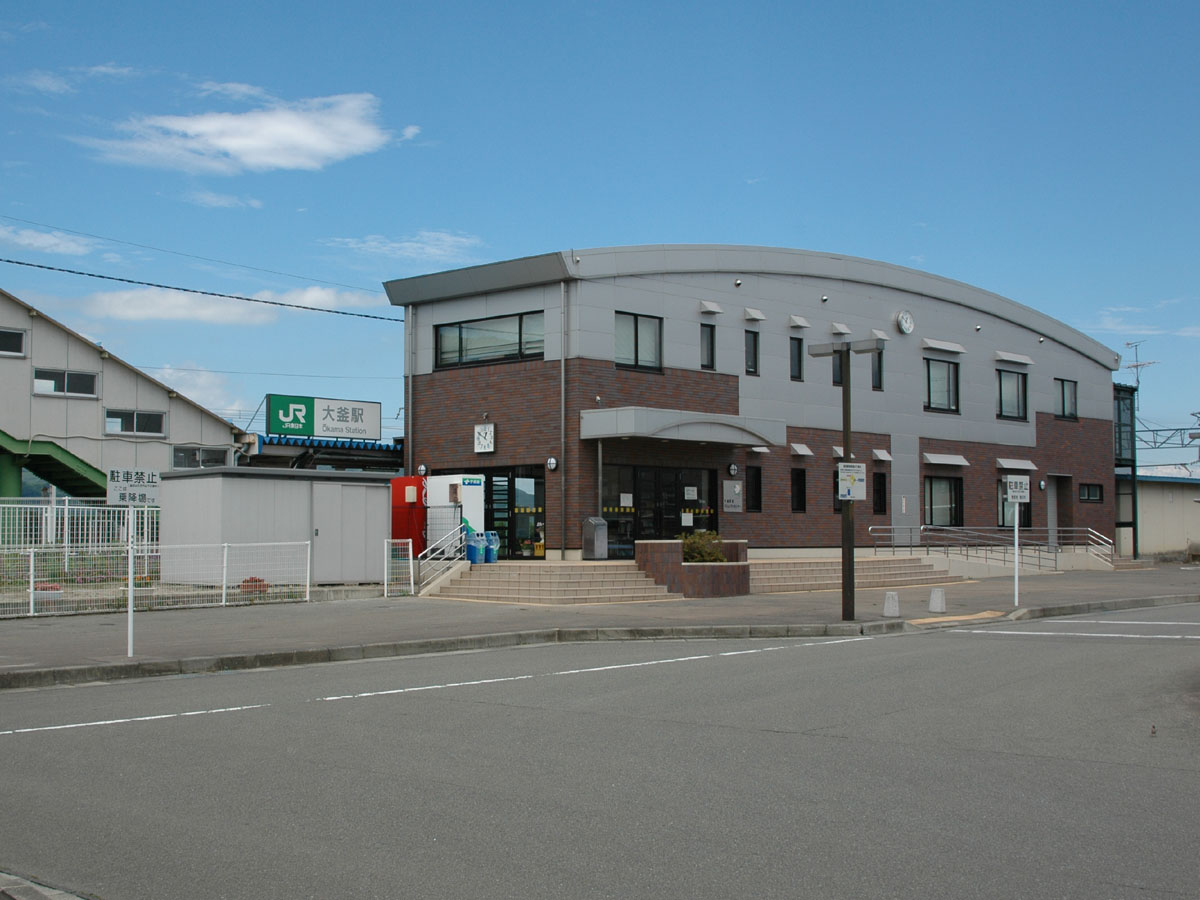
- Ōkama Station in July 2007

General information
- Location: Shinonogi-Akiho, Takizawa-shi, Iwate-ken 020-0161; Japan
- Coordinates: 39.7117°N 141.0720°E
- Operator: JR East
- Line: ■ Tazawako Line
- Distance: 6.0 km from Morioka
- Platforms: 2 side platforms
- Tracks: 2

Construction
- Structure type: At grade

Other information
- Status: Unstaffed station
- Website: Official website

History
- Opened: June 25, 1921

Passengers
- FY2015: 484

Services
| Preceding station | JR East | Following station |
|---|---|---|
| Koiwai towards Ōmagari | Tazawako Line | Maegata towards Morioka |
Location
- Location within Japan

Ōkama Station (大釜駅, Ōkama-eki) is an East Japan Railway Company (JR East) railway station located in the city of Takizawa, Iwate Prefecture, Japan.

== Lines ==
Ōkama Station is served by the Tazawako Line, and is located 6.0 km from the terminus of the line at Morioka Station.

== Station layout ==
Ōkama Station has two tracks. Track 1 is served by a side platform, on the station building side, and track 2 is served by an island platform with one side fenced off. Only track 1 is in normal use, and serves traffic in both directions.

Track 2 is fitted with a snow-melting device, which sprays hot water on the undercarriage of trains. In the winter, Tokyo-bound Akita Shinkansen trains stop here to have snow removed before they enter the Tōhoku Shinkansen at Morioka, since accumulated snow and ice on the undercarriage could cause damage if it broke off while the train was running at high speed.

=== Platforms ===
| 1, 2 | ■ Tazawako Line | for Morioka, Shizukuishi and Ōmagari |

== History ==
Ōkama Station opened on June 25, 1921. The station was absorbed into the JR East network upon the privatization of the JNR on April 1, 1987.

== Passenger statistics ==
In fiscal 2015, the station was used by an average of 484 passengers daily (boarding passengers only).

== Surrounding area ==
- National Route 46
- Takezawa City Office
- Shizukuishi River

== See also ==
- List of railway stations in Japan
