= Kuriyagawa Station =

Railway station in Morioka, Iwate Prefecture, Japan

Kuriyagawa Station 厨川駅
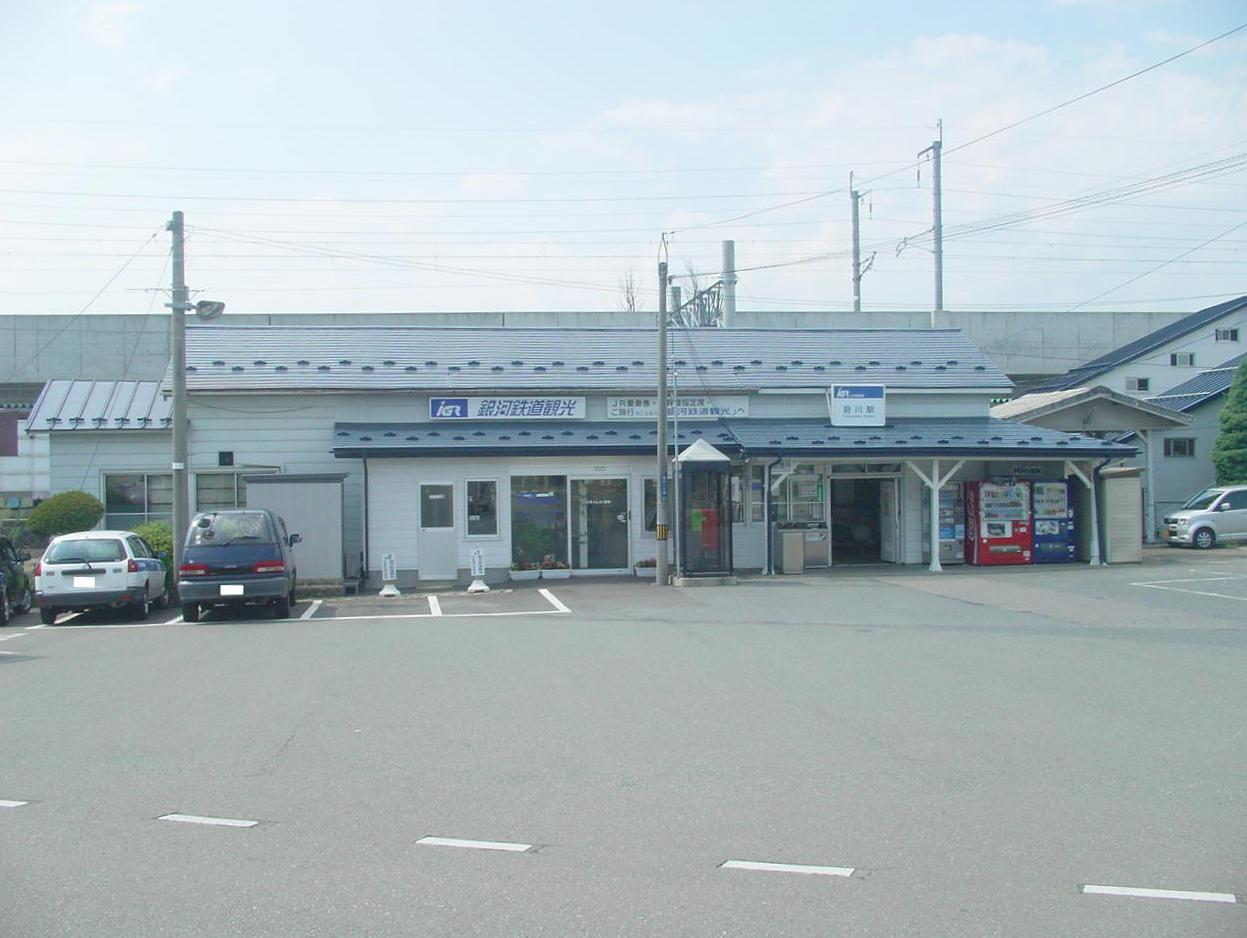
- Kuriyagawa Station, August 2007

General information
- Location: 1-17-1 Kuriyagawa, Morioka-shi, Iwate-ken 020-0124; Japan
- Coordinates: 39°44′40.7″N 141°7′45.7″E
- Operator: Iwate Galaxy Railway Company
- Line: ■ Iwate Ginga Railway Line
- Distance: 5.6 km from Morioka
- Platforms: 1 side + 1 island platforms
- Tracks: 3

Construction
- Structure type: At grade

Other information
- Status: Staffed
- Website: Official website

History
- Opened: November 1, 1918

Passengers
- FY2015: 2967 daily

Services
| Preceding station | JR East | Following station |
|---|---|---|
| Aoyama towards Morioka | Hanawa Line | Sugo towards Ōdate |
| Preceding station | Iwate Galaxy Railway | Following station |
| Aoyama towards Morioka | Iwate Galaxy Railway Line | Sugo towards Metoki |
Location
- Location within Japan

Kuriyagawa Station (厨川駅, Kuriyagawa-eki) is a railway station in the city of Morioka, Iwate Prefecture, Japan, operated by the Iwate Ginga Railway.

== Lines ==
Kuriyagawa Station is served by the Iwate Ginga Railway Line, and is located 5.6 rail kilometers from the terminus of the line at Morioka Station and 540.9 rail kilometers from Tokyo Station. Trains of the JR East Hanawa Line, which officially terminates at Kōma usually continue on to Morioka Station, stopping at all intermediate stations, including Kuriyagawa Station.

== Station layout ==
Kuriyagawa Station has one island platform and one side platform connected to the station building by a footbridge. The station is staffed.

=== Platforms ===
| 1 | ■ Iwate Ginga Railway Line | for Morioka |
| 1 | ■ Hanawa Line | for Ōbuke, Araya-Shinmachi and Kazuno-Hanawa |
| 2 | ■ Iwate Ginga Railway Line | for Iwate-Numakunai, Ninohe and Hachinohe |

== History ==
Kuriyagawa Station was opened on November 1, 1918. The station was absorbed into the JR East network upon the privatization of the Japanese National Railways (JNR) on 1 April 1987 and was transferred to the Iwate Ginga Railway on 1 September 2002.

== Passenger statistics ==
In fiscal 2015, the station was used by an average of 2967 passengers daily.

== Surrounding area ==
- Kuriyagawa Post Office
- Iwate-Kenpoku Bus Morioka Bus office
- Japan National Route 4

== See also ==
- List of railway stations in Japan
