= Higashi-Ōbuke Station =

Railway station in Hachimantai, Iwate prefecture, Japan

Higashi-Ōbuke Station 東大更駅
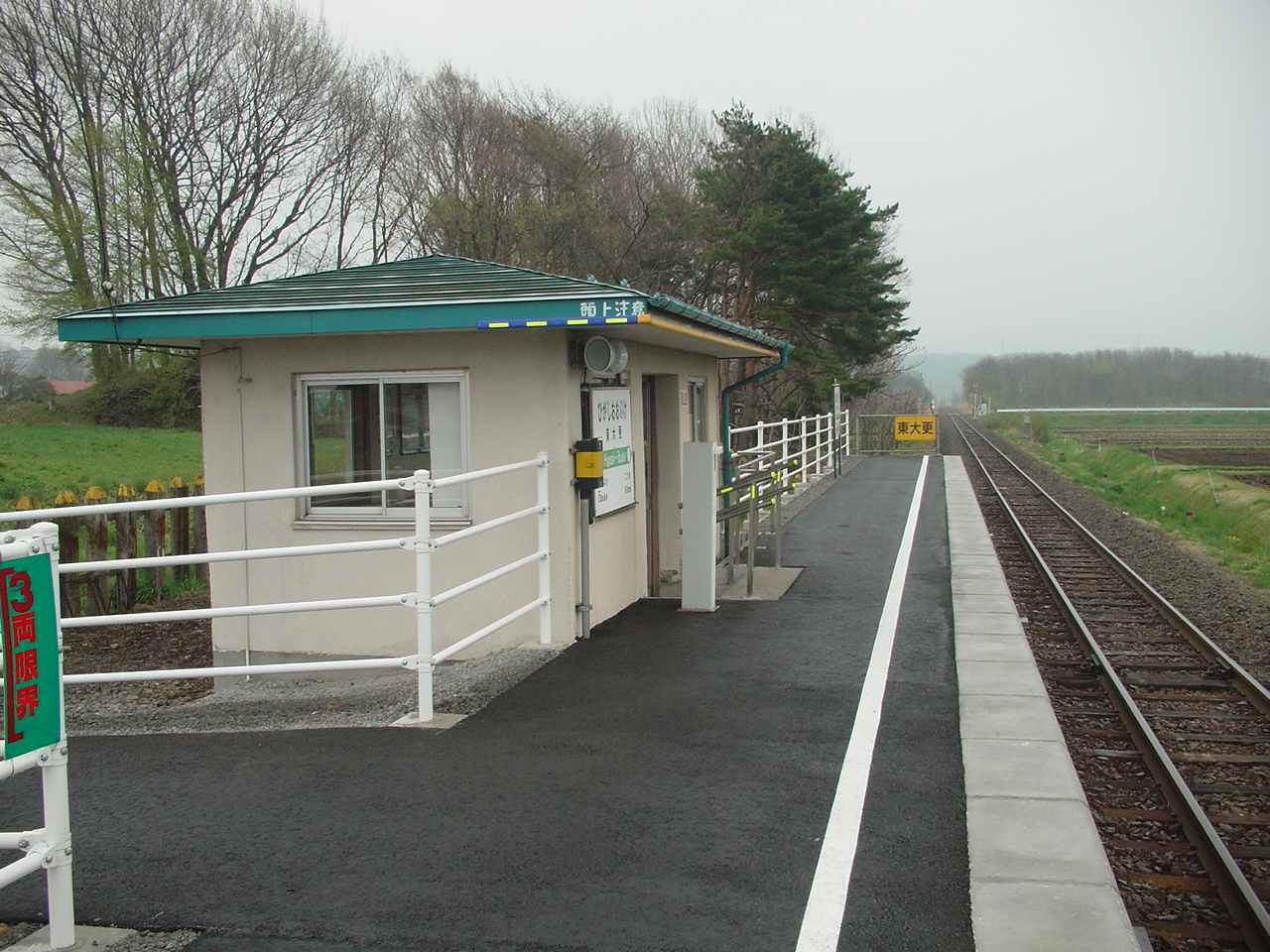
- Higashi-Ōbuke Station in May 2007

General information
- Location: Ōbuke, 7 Jiwari 99, Hachimantai-shi, Iwate-ken 028-7111; Japan
- Coordinates: 39°54′9.4″N 141°8′33.2″E
- Operator: JR East
- Line: ■ Hanawa Line
- Distance: 4.9 km from Kōma
- Platforms: 1 side platform
- Tracks: 1

Construction
- Structure type: At grade

Other information
- Status: Unstaffed
- Website: Official website

History
- Opened: December 1, 1960

Services
| Preceding station | JR East | Following station |
|---|---|---|
| Ōbuke towards Ōdate | Hanawa Line | Kōma towards Morioka |
Location
- Location within Japan

Higashi-Ōbuke Station (東大更駅, Higashi-Ōbuke-eki) is an East Japan Railway Company (JR East) railway station on the Hanawa Line in the city of Hachimantai, Iwate Prefecture, Japan.

== Lines ==
Higashi-Ōbuke Station is served by the 106.9 km Hanawa Line, and is located 4.9 kilometers from the starting point of the line at Kōma.

== Station layout ==
Higashi-Ōbuke Station has a single side platform serving a single bi-directional track. The station is unattended.

== History ==
Higashi-Ōbuke Station opened on December 1, 1960, as a station serving the village of Nishine. The station was absorbed into the JR East network upon the privatization of JNR on April 1, 1987.

== Surrounding area ==
- Nambu-Fuji Country Club

== See also ==
- List of railway stations in Japan
