= Morioka Junior College =

Coordinates: 39°48′4.3″N 141°8′15.3″E

Morioka Junior College, Iwate Prefectural University
- 岩手県立大学盛岡短期大学部
- Type: Public
- Established: 1951
- Location: Takizawa, Iwate, Japan
- Website: www-mori.iwate-pu.ac.jp

Morioka Junior College, Iwate Prefectural University (岩手県立大学盛岡短期大学部, Iwate Kenritsu Daigaku Morioka Tanki Daigakubu) is a public junior college in Takizawa, Iwate, Japan. It was established in 1951 in Morioka, Iwate, and has been attached to Iwate Prefectural University since 1998.

== Departments ==
- Department of Home Economics
- Department of International culture

== See also ==
- List of junior colleges in Japan
- Miyako Junior College
