= Miyako Junior College =

Coordinates: 39°37′8.29″N 141°57′3.59″E

Iwate Prefectural University, Miyako College
- 岩手県立大学宮古短期大学部
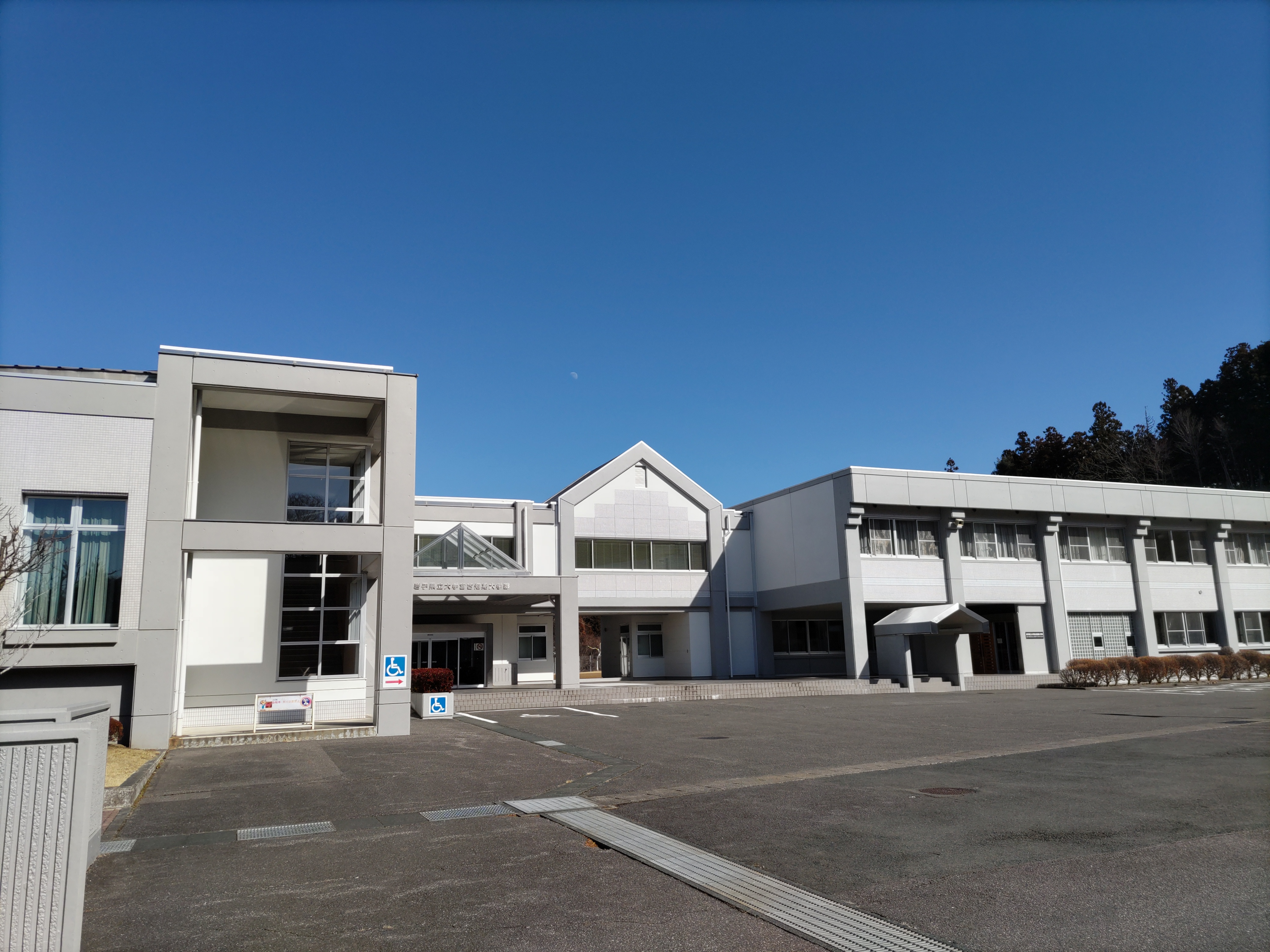
- Type: Public
- Established: 1990
- Location: Miyako, Iwate, Japan
- Website: www-myk.iwate-pu.ac.jp

Iwate Prefectural University, Miyako College (岩手県立大学宮古短期大学部, Iwate Kenritsu Daigaku Miyako Tanki Daigakubu) is a public junior college in Miyako, Iwate, Japan. It was established in 1990, and has been attached to Iwate Prefectural University since 1998.

== Departments ==
- Department of Management and Information studies

== See also ==
- List of junior colleges in Japan
- Morioka Junior College
