= Chagu Chagu Umakko =

Horse festival in Iwate Prefecture, Japan

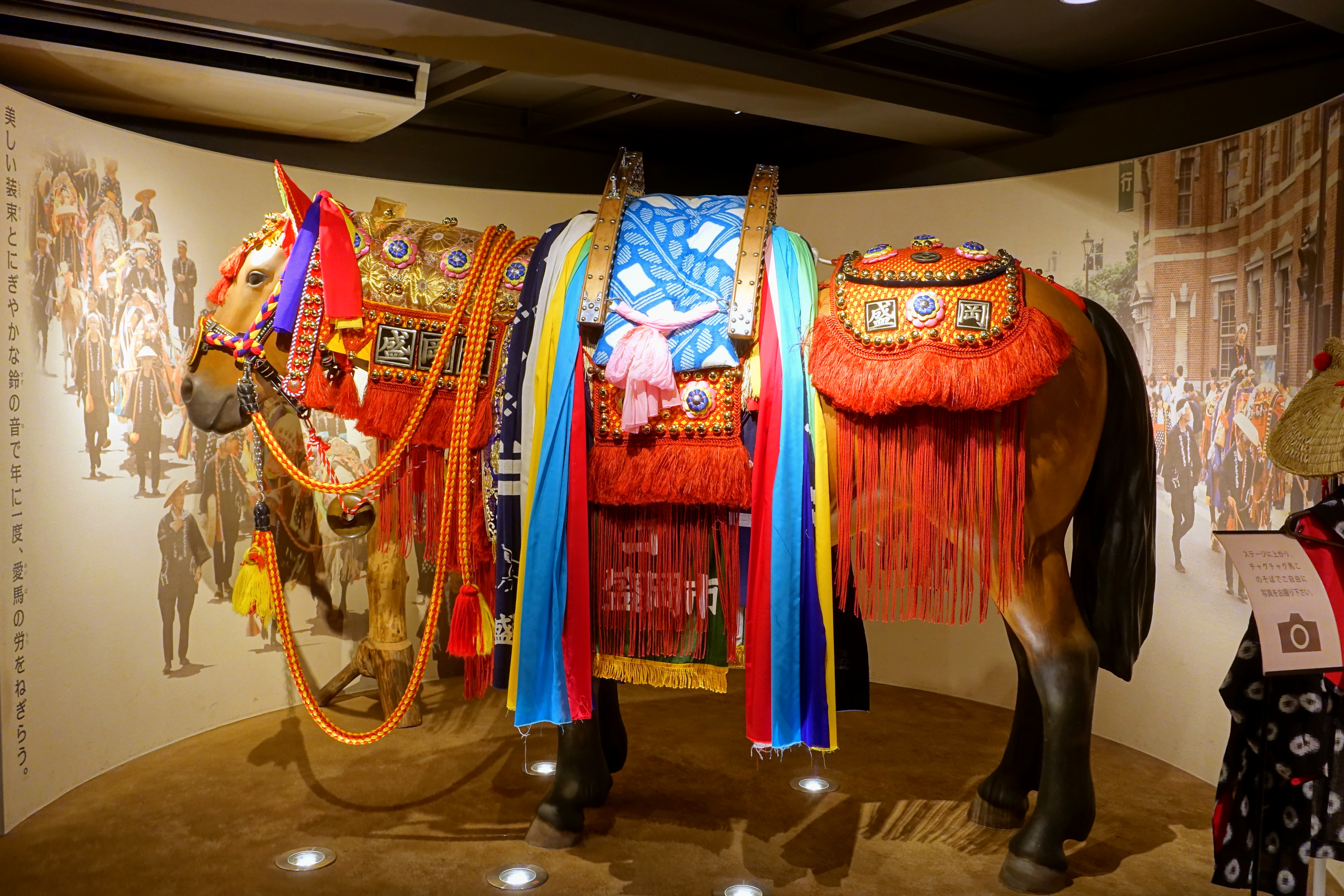
Display of a Chagu Chagu Umakko horse costume at the Morioka History and Culture Museum

Chagu Chagu Umakko (チャグチャグ馬コ) is a horse festival in Iwate Prefecture, Japan. Held on the second Saturday in June, approximately one hundred horses with colourful fittings and bells parade depart from Onikoshi Sōzen Shrine(ja) in Takizawa to Morioka Hachiman-gū. The term chagu-chagu is an onomatopoeic expression for the sound made by the horses' bells. In 1978 the festival was recorded as an Intangible Folk Cultural Property. In 1996 the sound of the bells of the Chagu Chagu Umakko was selected by the Ministry of the Environment as one of the 100 Soundscapes of Japan.

== See also ==
- Matsuri
- List of Important Intangible Folk Cultural Properties
- 100 Soundscapes of Japan
