= Sayuri Yōko =

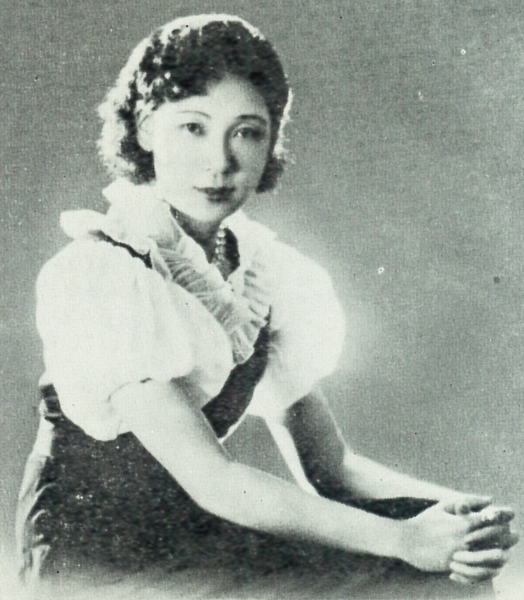
- Photograph from "Creative theatre"
- Born: Mie Yamashita; September 25, 1901; Takizawa, Toda Village, Hisa-Gun, Shizuoka Prefecture, Japan
- Died: January 13, 1986 (died 84); Hamamatsu City, Shizuoka Prefecture, Japan
- Occupation(s): Professional Theatre Company President, Actress

Mie Yamashita (in original Japanese: 山下 みゑ) (September 25, 1901 – January 13, 1986), better known by her stage name Sayuri Yōko (小百合 葉子/さゆり ようこ), was a Japanese theatre company president and actress. She is the founder and chairman of Dandelion, a children's theatre company. She was active as a stage, radio and film actress before and during the war. After the war, she founded a children's theatre company and devoted her life to her company. She was called 'a living witness to children's theatre after the war'.

== History ==
=== Early years ===
Sayuri Yōko was born in 1901 in Takizawa, Toda Village, Hikisa County, Shizuoka Prefecture (later Takizawa Town, Kita Ward, Hamamatsu City). She lost her father when she was eight years old. Her mother went back to her parents' home, Kawana Village, but Yōko remained where she was as a successor of the family. Although she lived comfortably surrounded by her great-uncle and servants, she left home to live with her mother in Kawana because she missed her. Takizawa and Kawana were only 4 km away, so Yōko grew up in both villages.

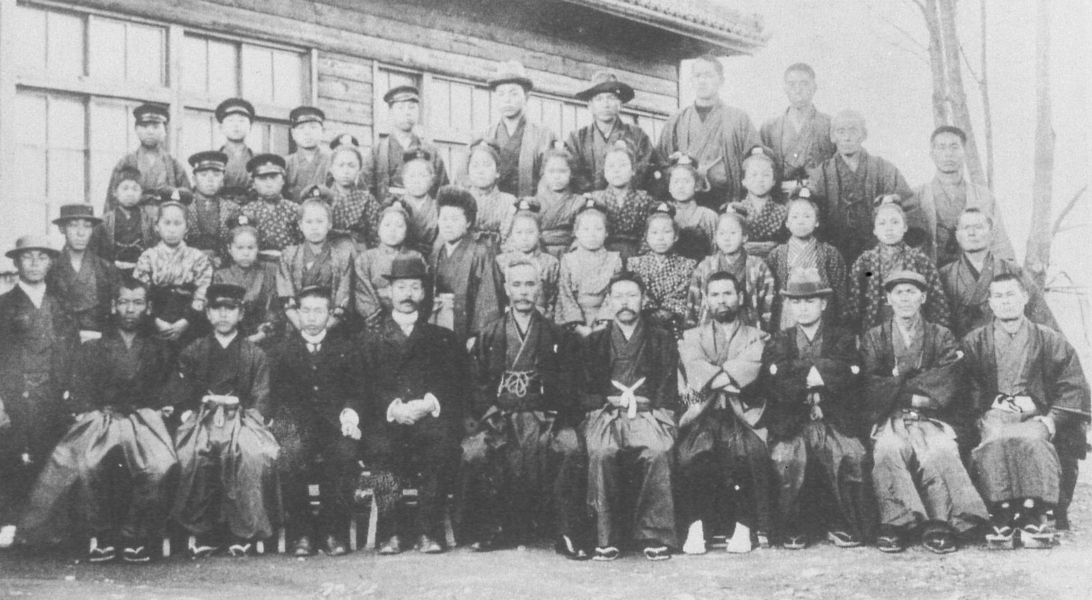
A group photo of Kawana Elementary School graduation. Yōko is on the second row from the front and the seventh from the right.

In 1914, after graduating from elementary school, Yōko entered Nishien Jitsugakuen High School (later Nishien Girls' Gakuen) in Hamamatsu City. As a lonely child, when she was in her third year of girls' school, she decided she wanted to become a teacher to support children. However, when she requested documents from the government office to take the entrance examination for the Normal School, it was discovered that her registration on the family register was as a child of illegitimate origin. The father was the eldest son, and the mother was the eldest daughter of a family without a son, and they could not get married formally as successors of their families. Thus, the mother was not a member of the Yamashita family. This forced her to give up her teaching career.

Feeling disappointed and that she had no future studying, Yōko went to the principal's office to announce her intention to abandon school. When Iwao Okamoto, the principal of the school, asked about her future after leaving school, Yōko replied, "I will be the worst delinquent in Japan". Okamoto thought about it and said, "At least graduate. If you study, you can become the worst delinquent not just in Japan, but in the whole world". Yōko decided to continue with her education.

While at this girls' school, a play was staged at the Kabuki-za Theatre in Hamamatsu as part of a school event. A troupe of popular actors, including Otojiro Kawakami, visited Hamamatsu to perform "Momotarō". The play was intended for children, and written to be easily understand and funny. Yōko was so fascinated by the world of theatre that even after the play was over she remained transfixed in her seat.

After graduating from the girls' school, Yōko got married. However, in addition to the issue of the family register, the marriage was broken off because there were leprosy patients in the family and at that time leprosy was misunderstood as a genetic disease. Having lost both her dreams of becoming a teacher and her marriage, Yōko decided to leave Hamamatsu to go to the city and work for Osaka City Hall to make a life of her own. At first, she was hired on a temporary basis, but offered to be made permanent in recognition of her hard work. However, the issue of the family register again led to the cancellation of the offer of full employment.

=== Suicide attempt - Recovery ===
In 1923, Yōko left for Yokkaichi in Mie Prefecture and attempted to commit suicide in a forest by overdosing on a sedative. However, she survived and was rescued by passers-by and taken to hospital. While recovering in the hospital, she decide to decorate the hospital room with dandelions that bloomed in the hospital's ground. Yōko attempted to dig up the flower in the garden, but the dandelion root was surprisingly thick and long, and she found that it could not be dug up. Reflecting on the flower, Yoko swore to live strong like a dandelion that grows up strong even after being trampled on and produces beautiful blooms. In later years, haiku poet Matarō Kubota presented Yoko with the phrase 'Dandelion Teach Me the Way'.

=== Towards Theatre ===
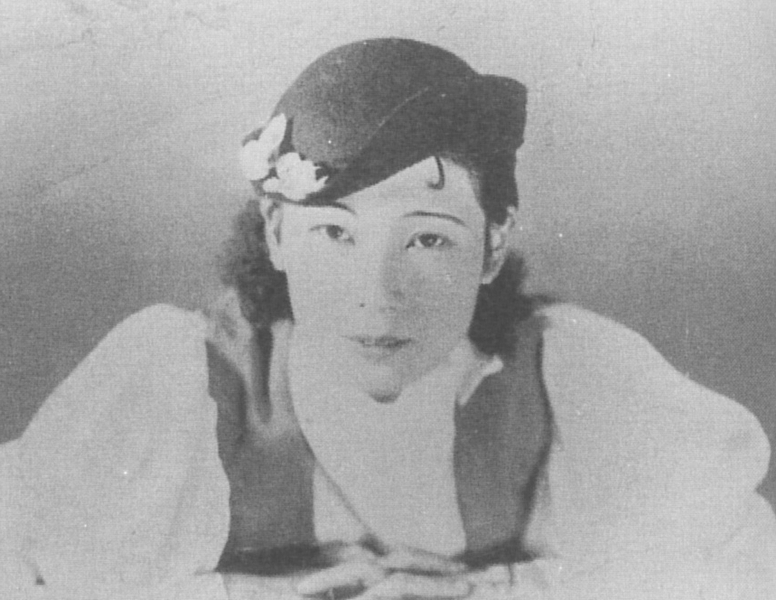
Yōko at the age of 30.

After recovering from her suicide attempt, Yōko remembered the stage of Otojirō Kawakami and others she had seen in her school days and aimed for theatre. The idea was that theatre would allow her to spend time with children and restore their dreams. In 1922, Yōko came to Tokyo to study drama, relying on her cousin who lived in Tokyo. At that time, each university in Tokyo had a drama study group, where new plays were studied, and joint performances were held. After relying on her relatives for accommodation, Yōko joined the Surudai Theatre Society of Meiji University where her cousin was a student and devoted herself to the new drama that was under study at the above-mentioned society. At a time when there were few young women and actresses trying to study drama, Yōko's presence was appreciated by the society.

With money sent by her mother, there was no need to worry about daily living expenses. However, after learning of Yōko's desire to become a theatre actor, her mother sent her a letter in which she essentially disowned her, and stopped sending her money. At that time, actors were often referred to by the derrogatory term kawara kojiki. After moving from job to job, Yōko started working as a waitress at a cafe near Shibuya Station, and later at the café "Maruya Western Cuisine" near Shinjuku 3-chōme. "Maruya" was visited almost every day by young artists, painters, and musicians of the time, and Yōko became involved with them. In particular, the writer Seiichi Funahashi liked Yōko's hospitality, knew that she was in the same business, and helped Yōko in many ways. If Yōko and others wanted to perform Funabashi's plays, they would immediately receive permission, and sometimes they would take on the direction themselves. In 1923, she took the stage name 'Sayuri Yōko'.

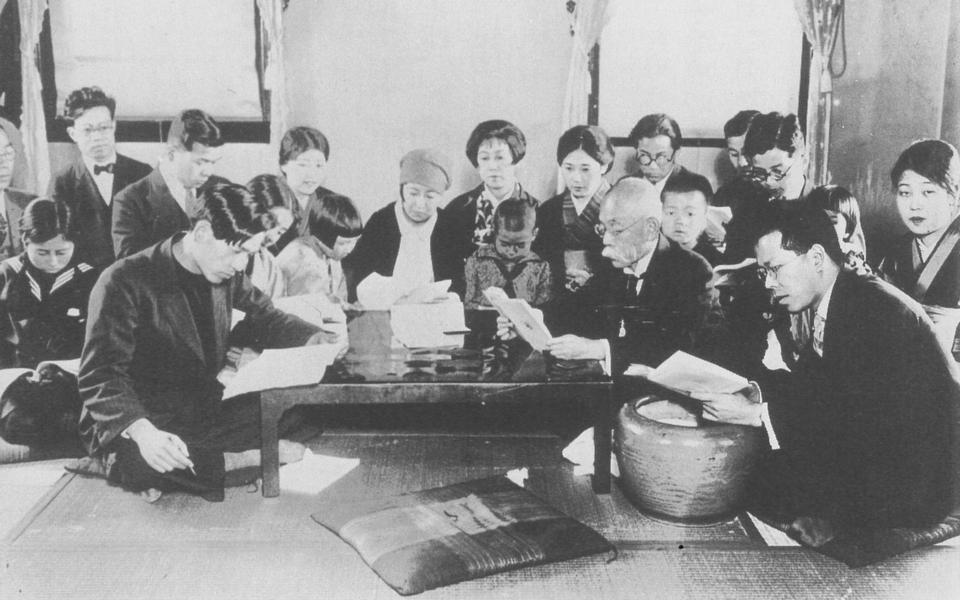
The study scene at Waseda Children's Theater Study Group. Tsubouchi Shōyō is the second man with a beard from the right in the front row, and Yōko is diagonally behind him on the left.

In 1929, playwright Sadakazu Nakaki learned of Yōko's desire to perform a play that would please children and introduced Yōko to Nakaki's mentor, Tsubouchi Shōyō. When Yōko visited Tsubouchi, she was so impressed by the importance of children's theatre and the development of children through children's theatre that she joined the Waseda Children's Theatre Study Group presided over by Tsubouchi on the same day. Yōko looked up to Tsubouchi as her lifelong mentor, and even after Tsubouchi's death, she rarely missed visiting her grave on the anniversary of her death.

The following year, 1930, Yōko started to step on the stage for a new play. It was not a play within the scope of students' hobbies, but a performance by professionals. At the time, Tokyo established several theatre companies, which involved many poets, playwrights, literary figures, painters, and musicians. On the other hand, Yōko meeting with Tsubouchi led to her gradually devoting herself to children's theatre, so the play could not be put into action immediately because it required the cooperation of many people, not only herself.

In 1932, presided over by the Asahi Shimbun, Yōko was to star in a performance in her hometown of Hamamatsu. Moreover, the venue was the Kabuki-za Theatre in Hamamatsu, where Yōko once learned its charm through plays by Otojirō Kawakami. However, Yōko's mother still did not understand her profession as an actor, and Yōko as her biological daughter refused to perform in Hamamatsu, causing trouble to various groups. Okamoto, Yōko's former teacher, went out and persuaded her that Yōko's current occupation was not a low-prestige job, and finally, she was able to obtain her mother's permission.

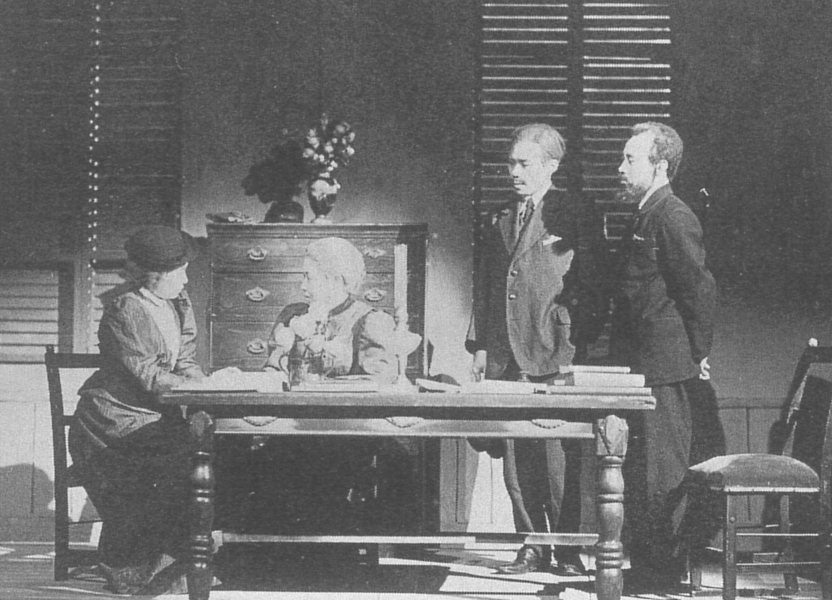
On stage: "Mrs. Curie". On the left is Yōko and in the middle is Sachiko Murase.

== See also ==
- Dandelion Theatre

== Sources ==
- Hamada, Keiko (浜田けい子) (1985-06-11). たんぽぽの花は野に山に 子どもにゆめをはこんだ「劇団たんぽぽ」と小百合葉子の40年 [Dandelion flowers grow in the fields and mountains: 40 years of the "Tanpopo Theater Company" and Yoko Sayuri, who brought dreams to children]. くもんのノンフィクション・愛のシリーズ [Kumon's non-fiction Love Series] (in Japanese). Kumon. ISBN 978-4-87576-217-1.
- 土方浩平 (1974-01-20). 信濃毎日新聞社開発局出版部編 (ed.). 長野県百科事典 (in Japanese). 信濃毎日新聞社.
- 本田節子 (1981-06-01). 芝居の中に"人生"を綴る. 望星 (in Japanese). 12 (6). 東海教育研究所. NCID AN00363431.
- 本田節子 (1986-11-20). 小百合葉子と「たんぽぽ」 (in Japanese). 東海大学出版会. ISBN 978-4-486-00956-6.
- 松尾邦之助 (1966-11-01). 引佐町物語 遠州郷土誌 (in Japanese). ふえみなあ社.
- 柳川麗子 (1950-08-01). 二十五年の情熱を新劇にささげる 小百合葉子とその劇団"たんぽぽ". 婦人倶楽部 (in Japanese). 31 (8). 講談社. NCID AN10268878.
- 資料篇 3. 芸能 (in Japanese). 11 (4). 芸能発行所. 1969-04-10. NCID AN00353405.
- 第一回『O夫人児童演劇賞』小百合葉子さんに決定. 児童演劇 (in Japanese) (300). 日本児童演劇協会. 1985-11-15. NCID AA11725190.
- さようなら 小百合葉子さん. 児童演劇 (in Japanese) (304). 1986-03-15.
- 日外アソシエーツ編, ed. (2004-07-26). 20世紀日本人名事典 (in Japanese). Vol. 上. 日外アソシエーツ. ISBN 978-4-8169-1853-7.
- 浜松市史 (in Japanese). Vol. 5. 浜松市. 2016-03-31.
- 浜松文芸十人の先駆者紹介 (PDF). 浜松文芸館だより いざない (in Japanese) (38). 浜松市文化振興財団. 2015-09-08.
- 松本市史 (in Japanese). Vol. 第2巻 IV. 松本市. 1997-09-30.
- 琉球新報百年史刊行委員会編, ed. (1993-09-15). 琉球新報百年史 (in Japanese). 琉球新報社.
