= Shibutami Station =

Railway station in Morioka, Iwate Prefecture, Japan

Shibutami Station 渋民駅
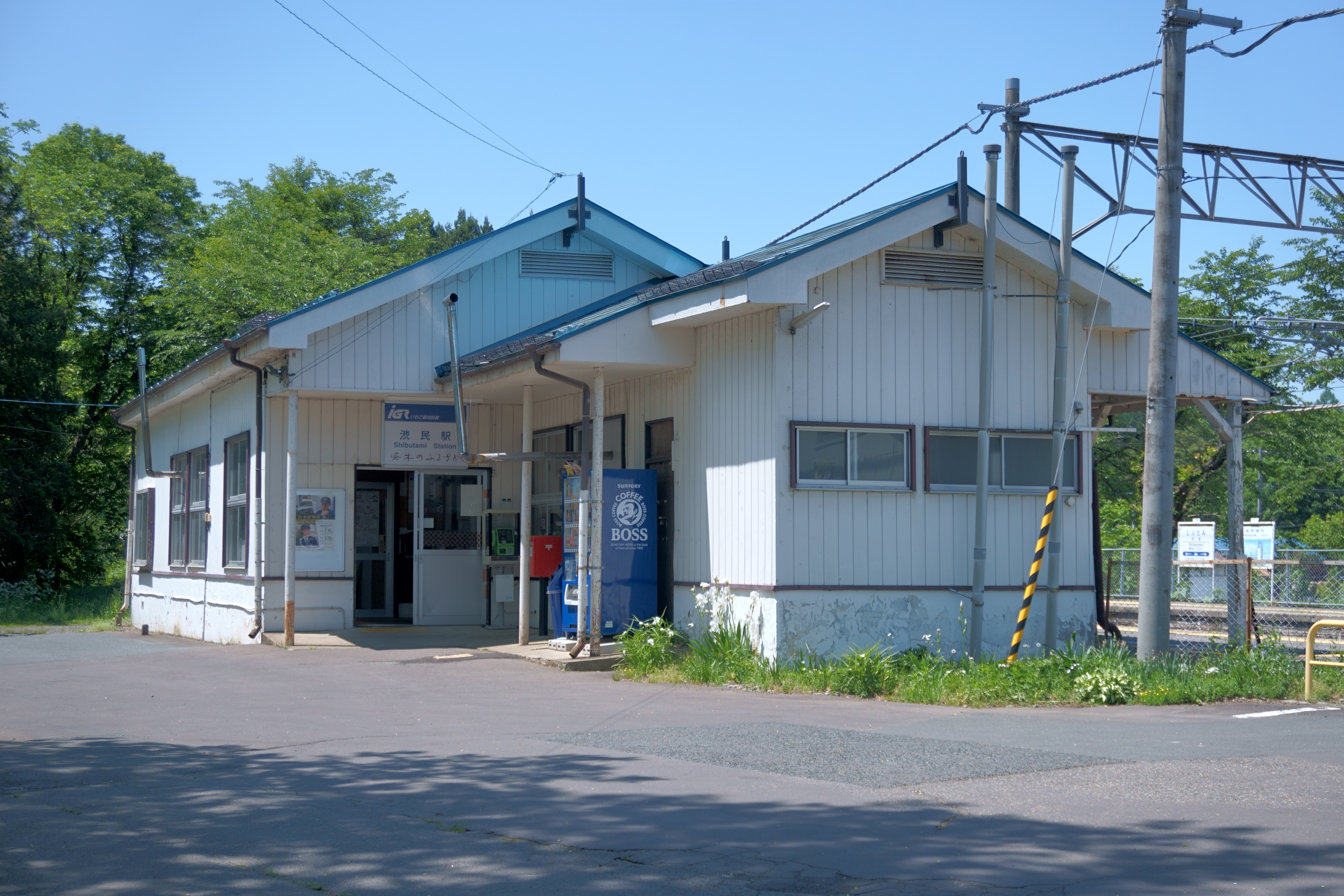
- Shibutami Station, May 2022

General information
- Location: Shimoda-Jinba 65-1, Tamayama-ku, Morioka-shi, Iwate-ken 028-4134; Japan
- Coordinates: 39°50′5.5″N 141°9′16.2″E
- Operator: Iwate Galaxy Railway Company
- Line: ■ Iwate Ginga Railway Line
- Distance: 16.6 km from Morioka
- Platforms: 2 side platforms
- Tracks: 2

Construction
- Structure type: At grade

Other information
- Status: Staffed
- Website: Official website

History
- Opened: 1 December 1950

Passengers
- FY2015: 660 daily

Services
| Preceding station | JR East | Following station |
|---|---|---|
| Takizawa towards Morioka | Hanawa Line | Kōma towards Ōdate |
| Preceding station | Iwate Galaxy Railway | Following station |
| Takizawa towards Morioka | Iwate Galaxy Railway Line | Kōma towards Metoki |
Location
- Location within Japan

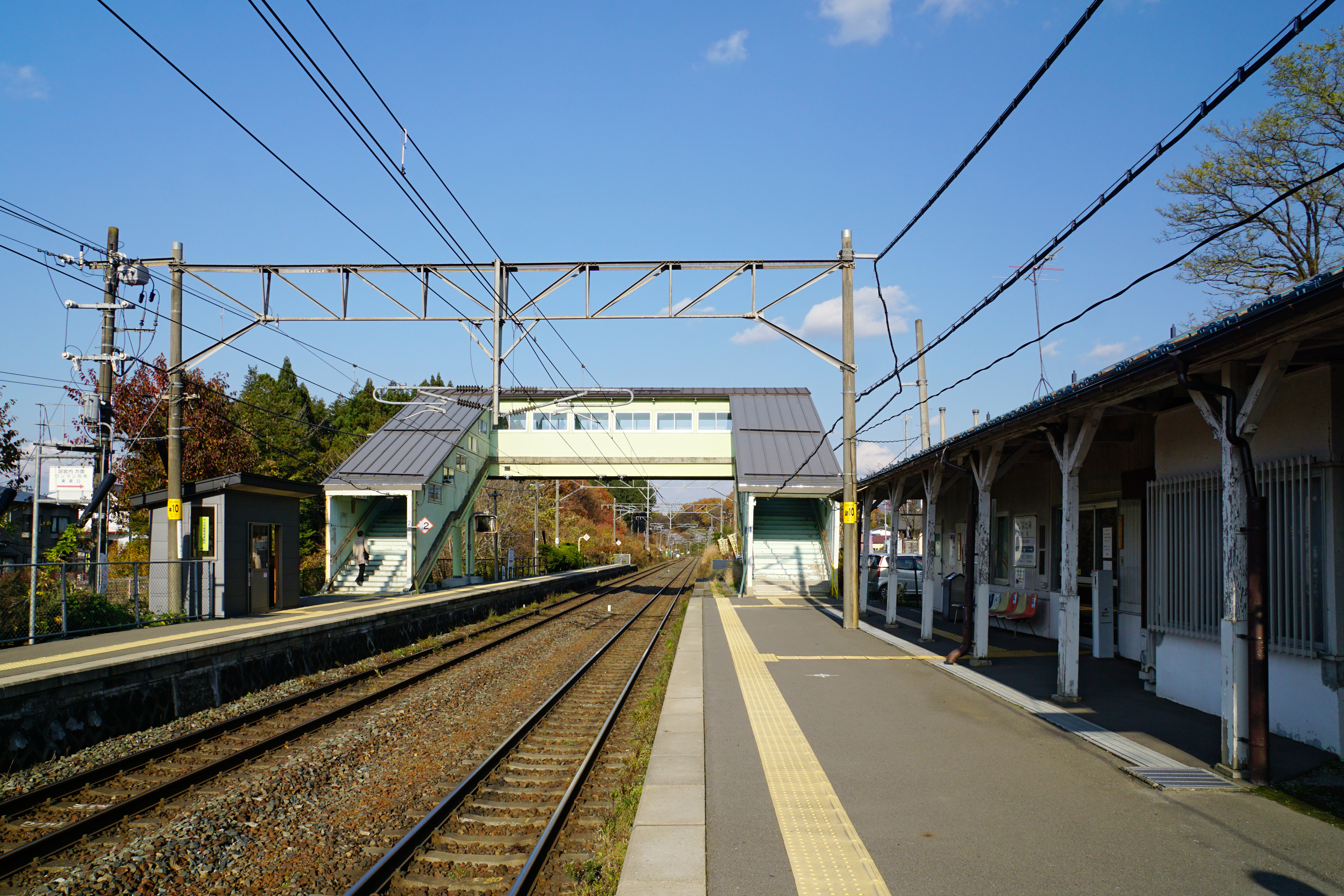
Platform

Shibutami Station (渋民駅, Shibutami-eki) is a railway station in the city of Morioka, Iwate Prefecture, Japan, operated by the Iwate Ginga Railway.

== Lines ==
Shibutami Station is served by the Iwate Ginga Railway Line, and is located 16.6 kilometers (10.3 mi) from the terminus of the line at Morioka Station and 551.9 kilometers (342.9 mi) from Tokyo Station. Trains of the JR East Hanawa Line, which officially terminates at Kōma usually continue on to Morioka Station, stopping at all intermediate stations, including Shibutami Station.

== Station layout ==
Shibutami Station has two opposed side platforms connected to the station building by a footbridge. The station is staffed.

=== Platforms ===
| 1 | ■ Iwate Ginga Railway Line | for Morioka |
| 2 | ■ Iwate Ginga Railway Line | for Iwate-Numakunai, Ninohe and Hachinohe |
| | ■ Hanawa Line | for Ōbuke, Araya-Shinmachi and Kazuno-Hanawa |

== History ==
Shibutami Station was opened on 1 December 1950. The station was absorbed into the JR East network upon the privatization of the Japanese National Railways (JNR) on 1 April 1987 and was transferred to the Iwate Ginga Railway on 1 September 2002.

== Passenger statistics ==
In fiscal 2015, the station was used by an average of 660 passengers daily.

== Surrounding area ==
- Kitakami River
- Shibutami Post Office
- Takuboku Ishikawa Memorial Museum
