= Shizukuishi River =

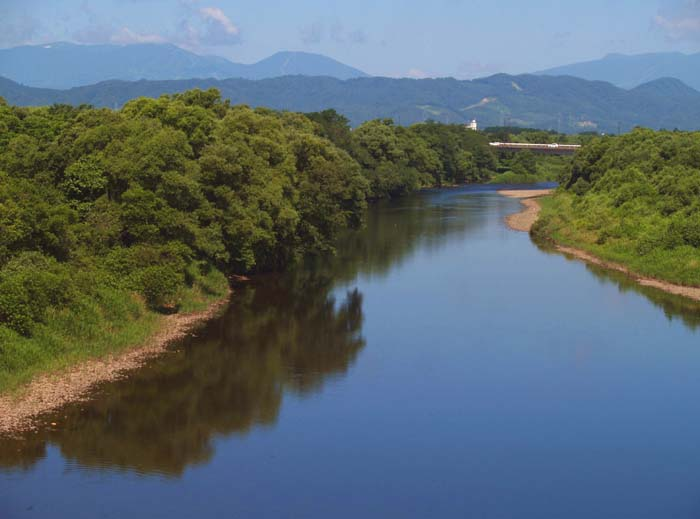
- Shizukuishi River looking northeast from the Morioka Chuo Bridge

- Location within Japan
- Native name: 雫石川 (Japanese)

Location
- Country: Japan

Physical characteristics
- Source
  - location: Mount Akita-Komagatake
  - elevation: 1,637 m (5,371 ft)
- Mouth
  - location: Kitakami River
  - coordinates: 39°41′40″N 141°08′40″E
- Length: 33.2 km (20.6 mi)
- Basin size: 168 km^{2} (65 sq mi)

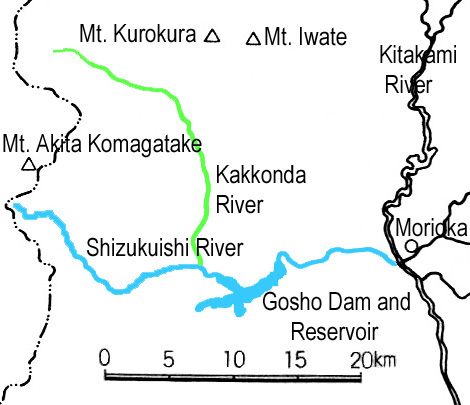
Shizukuishi and Kakkonda Rivers with the Gosho Dam and Reservoir

The Shizukuishi River (雫石川, Shizukuishigawa) is a river in Iwate Prefecture, in the Tōhoku region of northern Honshū in Japan. The river is 33.2 kilometres (20.6 mi) long and has a watershed of 168 square kilometres (65 sq mi). In middle course of the river is the Shizukuishi Basin, occupied by the Yuguchi lake deposits from the Late Miocene.

The Shizukuishi River rises in the Ōu Mountains just south of Mount Akita-Komagatake in the town of Shizukuishi and empties into the Kitakami River in the city of Morioka. The Gosho Dam is situated on the Shizukuishi River in western Morioka. This dam was completed in 1981. The entire length of the river is home to many renowned hot springs.
