= Iwate College of Nursing =

Private junior college in Takizawa, Iwate, Japan

Coordinates: 39°42′15.1″N 141°2′53.8″E

- 岩手看護短期大学
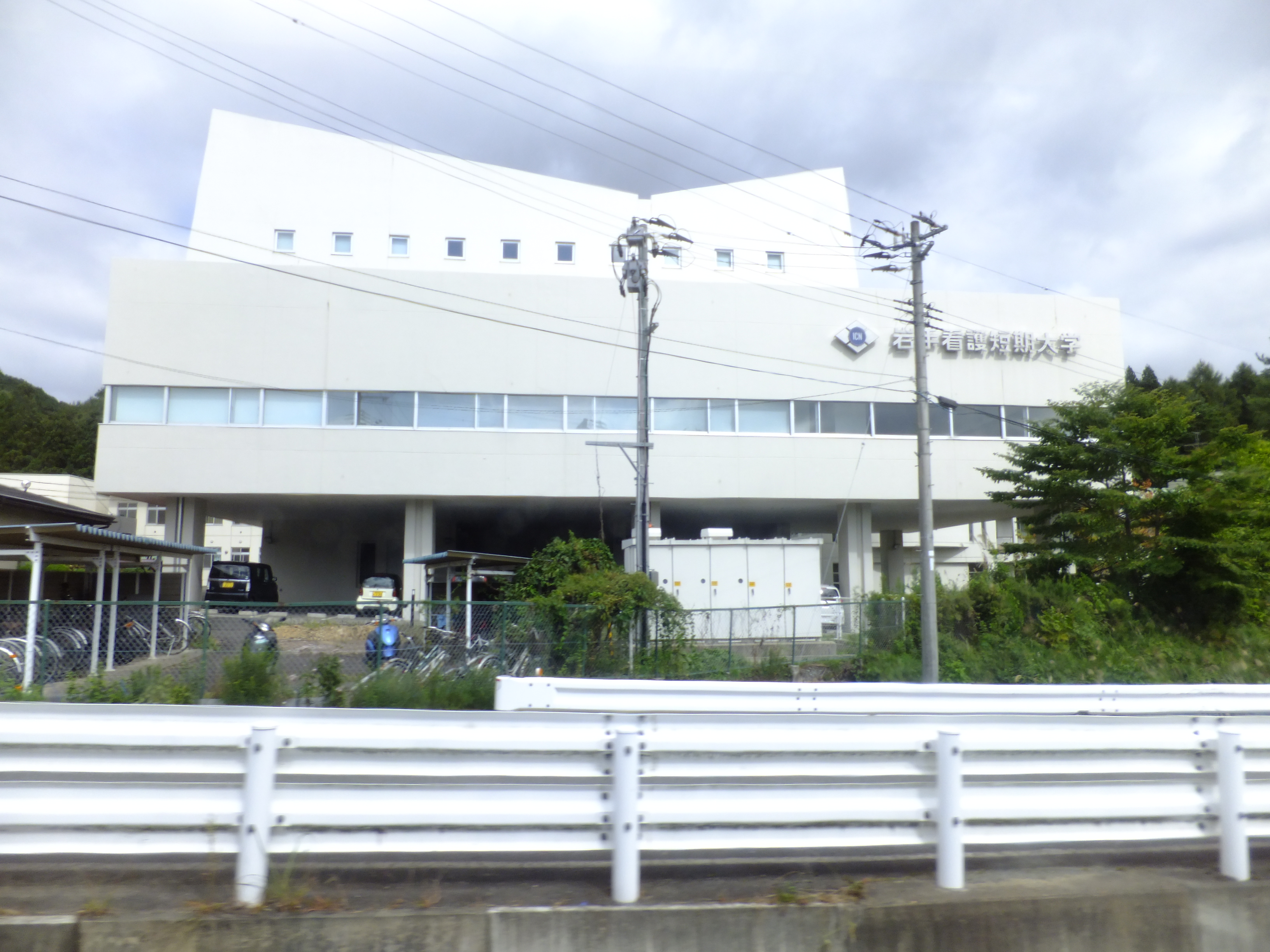
- Type: Private
- Established: 1990
- Undergraduates: 193
- Location: Takizawa, Iwate, Japan
- Website: Official website

Iwate College of Nursing (岩手看護短期大学, Iwate kango tanki daigaku) is a private junior college in Takizawa, Iwate, Japan. Originally established in 1990 as a women's junior college, it became coeducational in 2000.

== Curriculum ==
- Department of Nursing
- Department of Community Health Nursing
- Department of Midwifery
