= Gosho Dam =

Dam in Iwate Prefecture, Japan

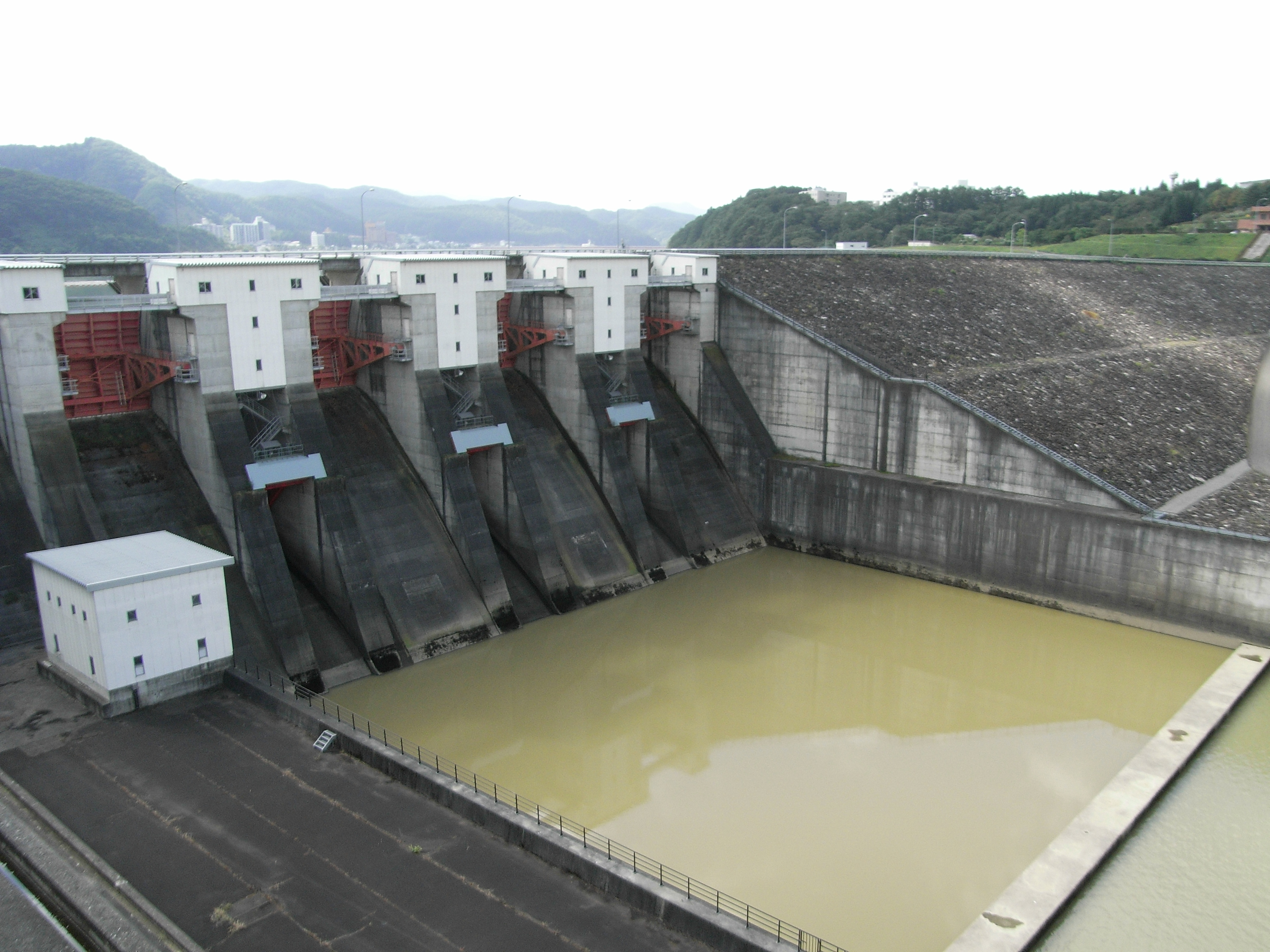

- Location within Japan
- Official name: 御所ダム
- Location: Morioka, Iwate, Japan
- Coordinates: 39°49′37″N 141°22′24″E
- Construction began: 1967
- Opening date: 1981
- Owner: Iwate Prefecture

Dam and spillways
- Type of dam: Gravity concrete & fill dam
- Impounds: Shizukuishi River
- Height: 52.5 m (172 ft)
- Length: 327 m (1,073 ft)
- Dam volume: 1,200,000 m^{3}

Reservoir
- Creates: Gosho Lake
- Total capacity: 65,000,000 m^{3}
- Catchment area: 635 km^{2}
- Surface area: 640 ha

Power Station
- Operator: Iwate Prefecture
- Annual generation: 13,000 KW

Gosho Dam (御所ダム, Gosho damu) is a multipurpose dam on the Shizukuishi River, a branch of the Kitakami River in Morioka, Iwate Prefecture, Japan, completed in 1981.

== History ==
Gosho Dam is the fifth of five large dams created in the Kitakami River valley for irrigation, industrial water, flood control and electric power generation under the aegis of the Ministry of Construction. The project was strongly promoted by the government from 1954, although plans for a dam in the area for the purpose of flood control had been drawn up in 1941. Preliminary site work began from 1953; however, negotiations for compensation for the 520 households displaced by the dam proved to be complicated, and were not concluded until in 1981, the year that the dam opened. During the construction phase the formation of a community driven development association to work alongside government agencies resulted in maximizing community benefits from the development, including creation of a multi-functional community asset and tourist attraction.

== Design ==
The initial design for the dam in 1941 called for a concrete gravity dam with a height of 32.5 meters. However, after many revisions, the Gosho Dam was completed as a hybrid design incorporating a concrete gravity dam with a central spillway together with a sloped wall rockfill dam. The dam was completed in 1981 by a joint venture of the Kajima Corporation with Nishimatsu Construction. The dam supplies the 13,000 KW Gosho Hydroelectric Power Plant.

The Gosho Reservoir created by the dam is a popular vacation location due to its ease of access to the metropolis of Morioka.
