= Aoyama Station (Iwate) =

Railway station in Morioka, Iwate Prefecture, Japan

Aoyama Station 青山駅
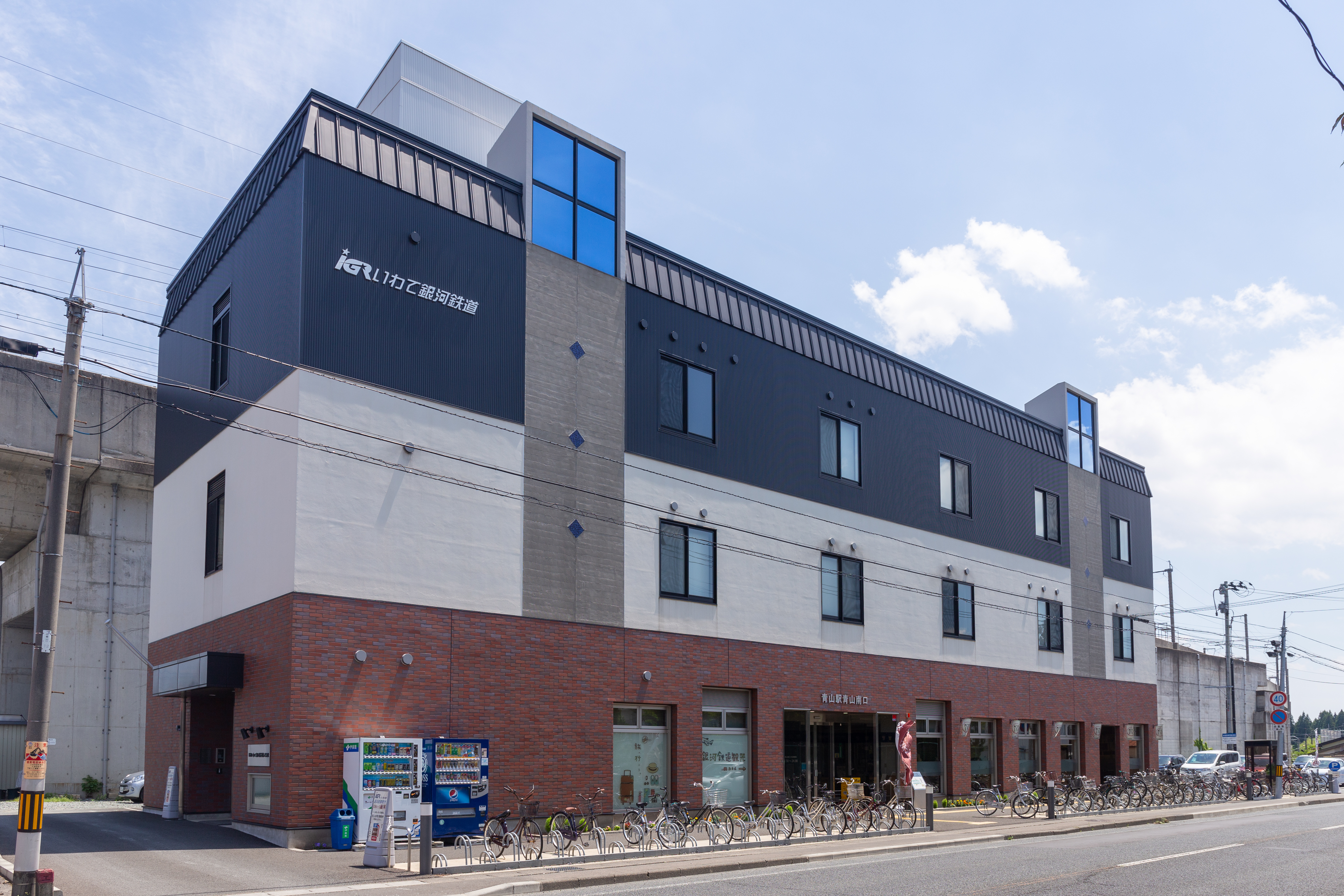
- Aoyama Station in June 2019

General information
- Location: 2-2-40 Aoyama, Morioka-shi, Iwate-ken 020-0133; Japan
- Coordinates: 39°43′29.9″N 141°7′5.8″E
- Operator: Iwate Galaxy Railway Company
- Line: ■ Iwate Ginga Railway Line
- Distance: 3.2 km from Morioka
- Platforms: 2 side platforms
- Tracks: 2

Construction
- Structure type: Underneath elevated platforms

Other information
- Status: Staffed
- Website: Official website

History
- Opened: March 18, 2006.

Passengers
- FY2015: 3060 daily

Services
Preceding station	JR East	Following station
Morioka Terminus	Hanawa Line	Kuriyagawa towards Ōdate
Preceding station	Iwate Galaxy Railway	Following station
Morioka Terminus	Iwate Galaxy Railway Line	Kuriyagawa towards Metoki
Location
- Location within Japan

Aoyama Station (青山駅, Aoyama-eki) is a railway station in the city of Morioka, Iwate Prefecture, Japan, operated by the Iwate Ginga Railway.

== Lines ==
Aoyama Station is served by the Iwate Ginga Railway Line, and is located 3.2 rail kilometers from the terminus of the line at Morioka Station and 538.5 rail kilometers from Tokyo Station. Trains of the Hanawa Line, which officially terminates at Kōma usually continue on to Morioka Station, stopping at all intermediate stations, including Aoyama Station.

== Station layout ==
Aoyama Station has two opposed elevated side platforms with the station located underneath. The station is staffed.

=== Platforms ===
1	■ Iwate Ginga Railway Line	for Iwate-Numakunai, Ninohe and Hachinohe
1	■ Hanawa Line	for Ōbuke, Araya-Shinmachi and Kazuno-Hanawa
2	■ Iwate Ginga Railway Line	for Morioka

== History ==
Aoyama Station was opened on March 18, 2006.

== Passenger statistics ==
In fiscal 2015, the station was used by an average of 3060 passengers daily.

== Surrounding area ==
- Iwate Prefectural Gymnasium
