= Iwate Prefectural University =

Coordinates: 39°48′4.3″N 141°8′15.3″E

- 岩手県立大学
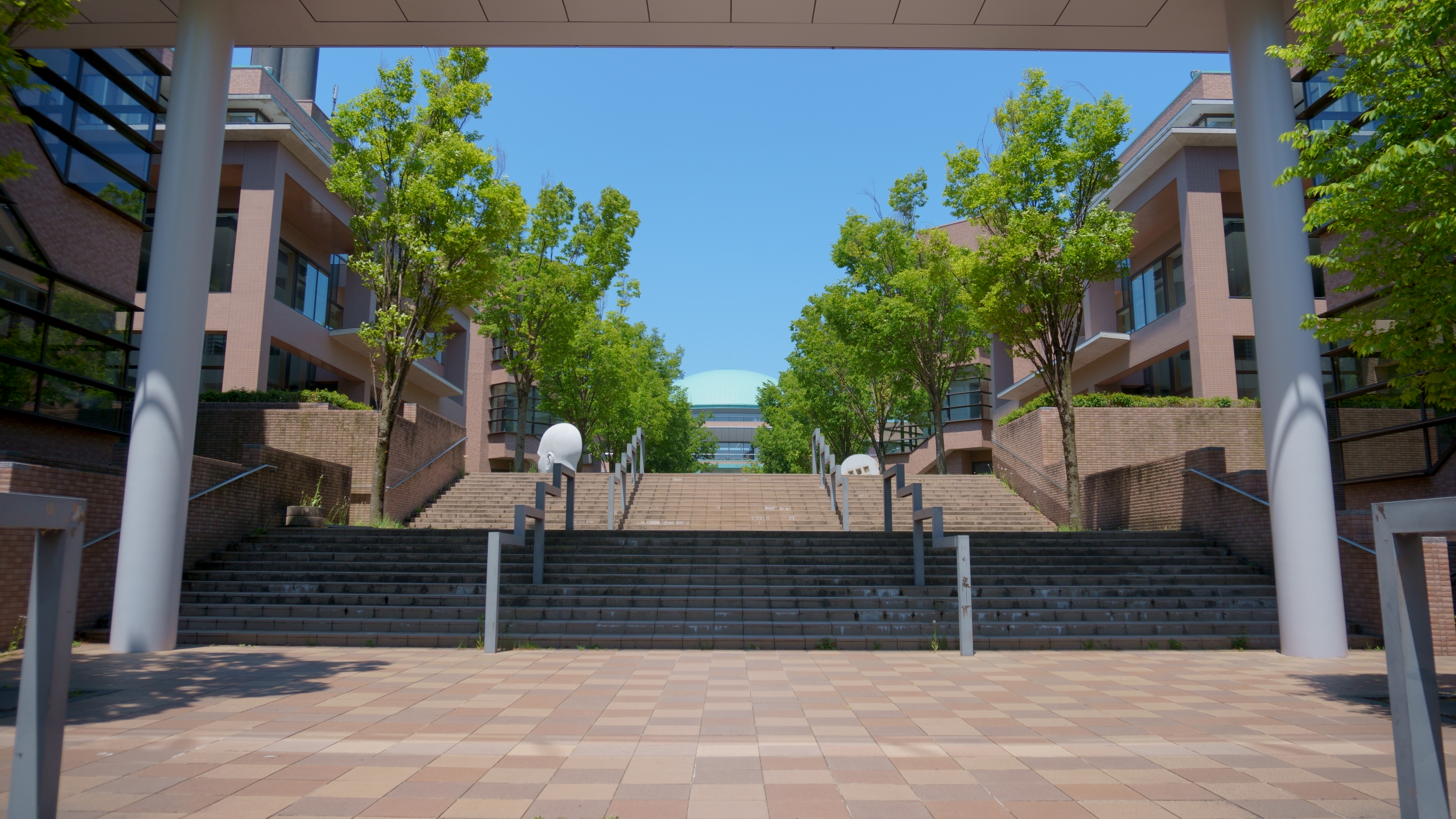
- Type: Public
- Established: 1998
- Location: Takizawa, Iwate Prefecture, Japan
- Website: http://www.iwate-pu.ac.jp/

Iwate Prefectural University (岩手県立大学, Iwate kenritsu daigaku) is a Japanese public university located in Takizawa, Iwate, founded in 1998.

== History ==
Iwate Prefectural University was established in 1998, with a graduate school following in 1999. In 2000, a teacher's training school was added, followed by a graduate school of nursing (master's and PhD program) in 2001.

== Organization ==
=== Undergraduate ===
- School of Nursing
- School of Social Welfare
- Faculty of Software and Information Science
- Faculty of Policy Management

=== Graduate ===
- Nursing Graduate School (Master's Program, Doctoral Program)
- Social Welfare Studies (Master's Program, Doctoral Program)
- Software and Information Science (Master's Program, Doctoral Program)
- Graduate School of Policy (Master's Program, Doctoral Program)

=== Junior Colleges ===
- Morioka Junior College
- Miyako Junior College
