= Morioka University =

University in Takizawa, Iwate, Japan

Coordinates: 39°48′55.4″N 141°8′17.8″E

- 盛岡大学
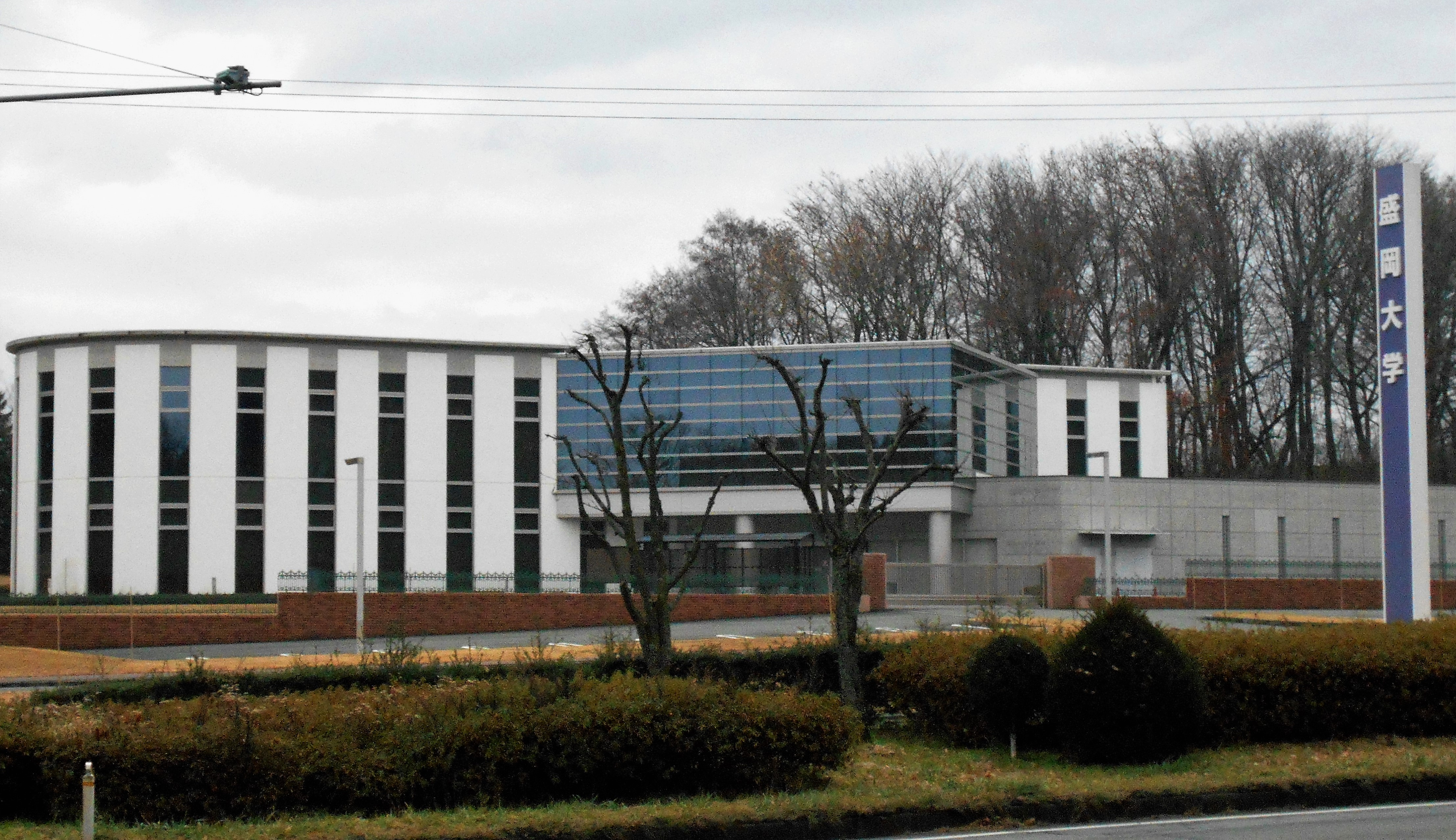
- Type: Private
- Established: 1981
- Location: Takizawa, Iwate, Japan
- Website: http://www.morioka-u.ac.jp

Morioka University (盛岡大学, Morioka daigaku) is a private university in Takizawa, Iwate, Japan. Established in 1981, the predecessor of the school was founded in 1950 as a specialty school.

Morioka Daigaku Junior College (盛岡大学短期大学部, Morioka Daigaku Tanki Daigakubu) was founded in 1964 as Seikatsu Gakuen Tankidaigaku (生活学園短期大学). In April 1990, it was renamed Morioka Daigaku Junior College.

== Curriculum ==
- Department of Society and Culture
- Department of Nutritional Sciences
- Department of English and American Literature
- Department of Japanese Literature
- Department of Child Education
