= Morioka Hachimangū =

Shinto shrine in northern Japan

Morioka Hachiman Shrine 盛岡八幡宮
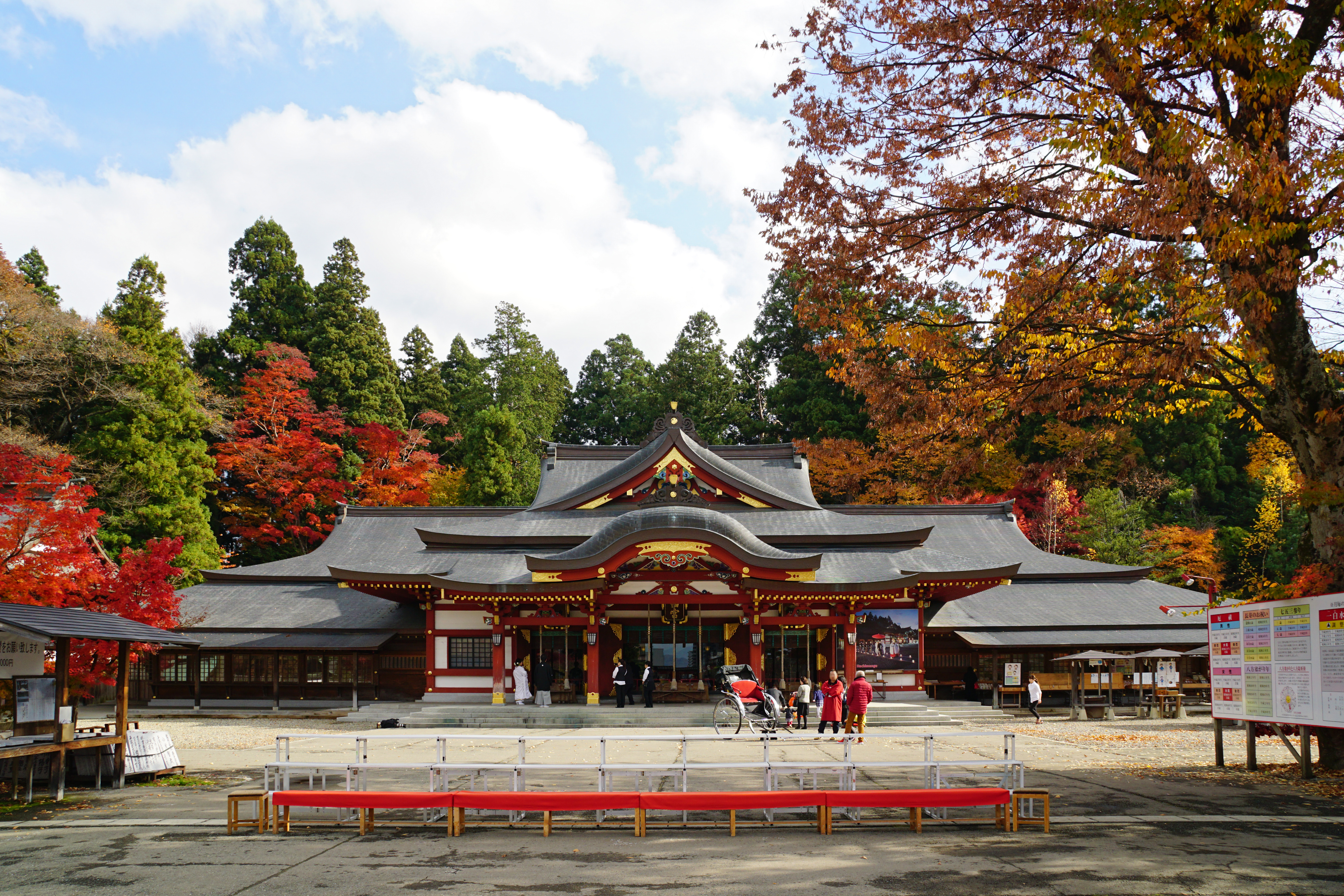
- Morioka Hachimangu Honden

- Location within Japan

Religion
- Affiliation: Shinto
- Deity: Hachiman
- Festival: September 15
- Type: Hachiman Shrine

Location
- Location: Yawata-cho 13-2, Morioka, Iwate
- Interactive map of Morioka Hachiman Shrine 盛岡八幡宮
- Coordinates: 39°41′43.11″N 141°09′50.62″E

Architecture
- Style: Hachiman-zukuri
- Established: 1062

Website
- www.morioka8man.jp

Morioka Hachimangū (盛岡八幡宮) is a Shinto shrine in the city of Morioka, Iwate in northern Japan. The shrine is noted for its annual festival on the second Saturday in June, which is famous for the Chagu Chagu Umakko, a horse parade which was recognized in 1978 as an Intangible Folk Cultural Property. In 1996 the sound of the bells of the Chagu Chagu Umakko was selected by the Ministry of the Environment as one of the 100 Soundscapes of Japan. The shrine is also noted for its displays of yabusame horse archery during its annual festival on September 15.

== History ==
The Morioka Hachimangū was established in 1062 during the late Heian period when Minamoto no Yoriyoshi brought a bunrei of the Minamoto clan’s tutelary shrine, the Iwashimizu Hachimangū in Kyoto to pray for victory in his campaign against the Abe clan in the Former Nine Years War. It was originally called the Hatomori Hachimangū (鳩森八幡宮). The shrine was rebuilt in 1593 by the Nanbu clan to be the protective shrine for Morioka Castle. Under the State Shinto system of shrine ranking from 1871 through 1946, the Morioka Hachimangū was officially designated as a "prefectural shrine". The Edo-period shrine structures burned down in 1884. The present main structure dates from 2006.

== Shinto belief ==
The shrine is dedicated to the veneration of the Shinto kami Hachiman. Hachiman has been recognized as an amalgamation of the semi-legendary Emperor Ojin and his consort, Empress Jingū.

== See also ==
- List of Shinto shrines
- Modern system of ranked Shinto Shrines
