= Mount Akita-Komagatake =

Active volcano on the island of Honshu in Japan

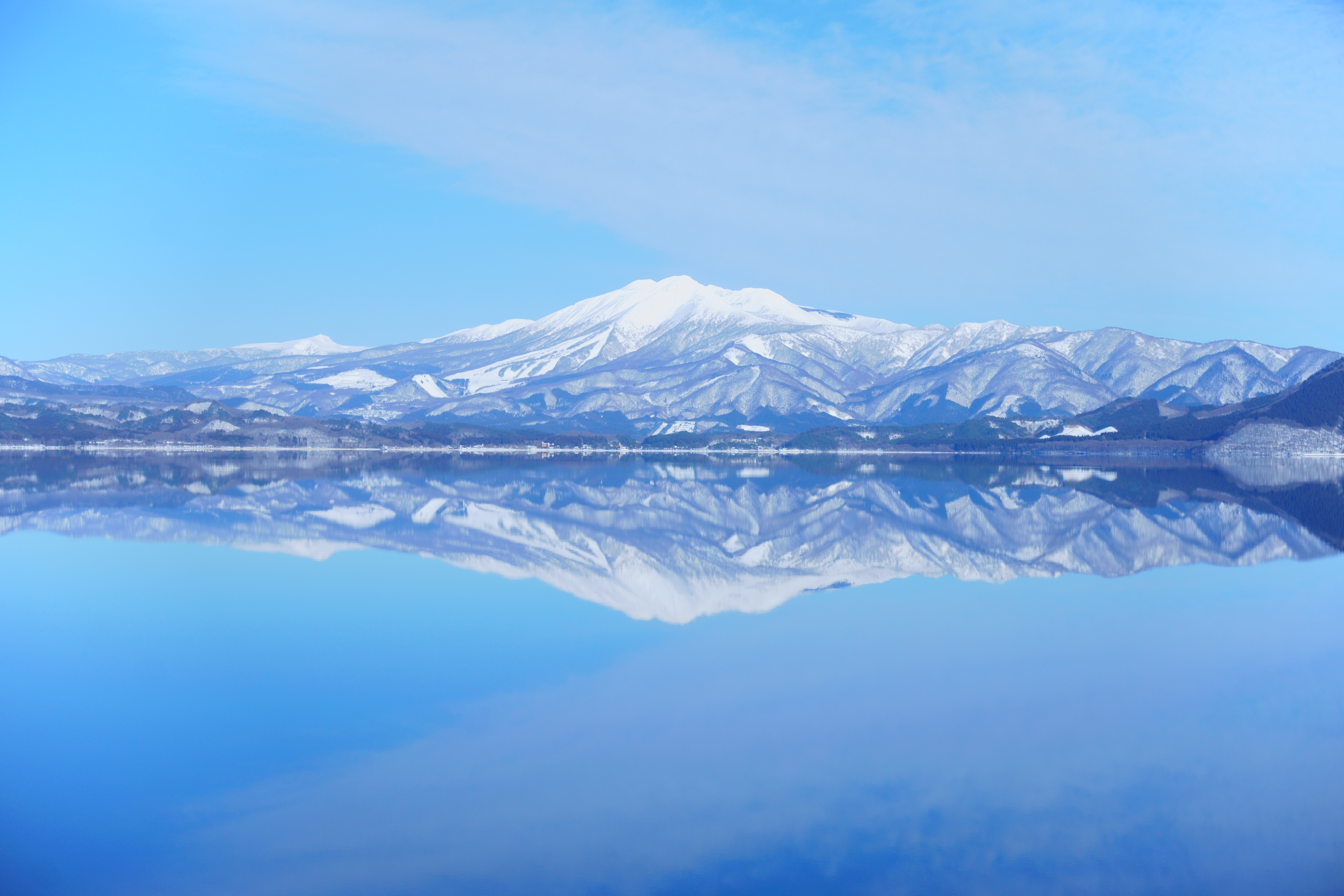
- Akita-Komaga-take volcano

Highest point
- Elevation: 1,637 m (5,371 ft)
- Coordinates: 39°45′40″N 140°47′56″E

Naming
- Native name: 秋田駒ヶ岳 (Japanese)

Geography
- Location within Japan
- Location: Tōhoku region, Honshu, Japan

Geology
- Mountain type: Stratovolcano
- Volcanic arc: Northeastern Japan Arc
- Last eruption: 1970 to 1971

Akita-Komagatake (秋田駒ヶ岳) is an active stratovolcano located 10 km east of Tazawa Lake, near the border between Akita and Iwate prefectures on Honshu Island. The volcano last erupted from 18 September 1970 to 25 January 1971. It is the highest mountain in Akita Prefecture and the second highest in Towada-Hachimantai National Park.

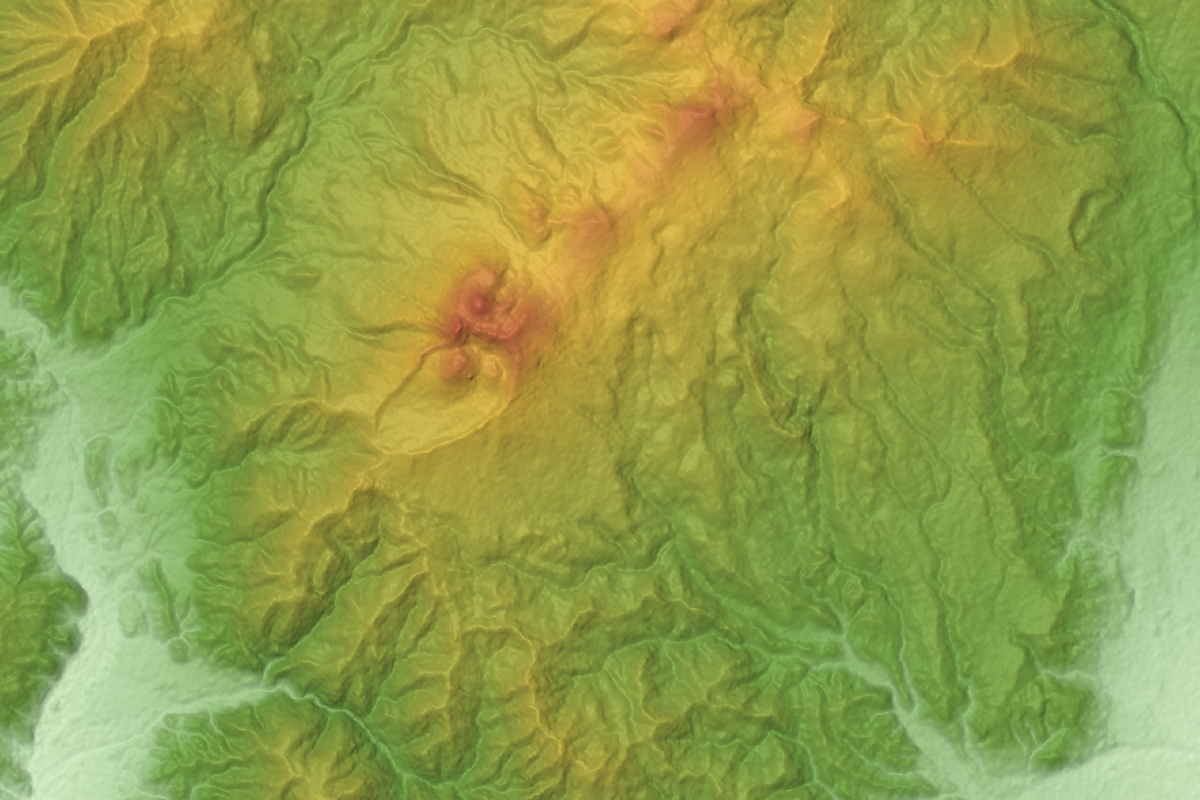
Relief Map
