= Kōma Station (Iwate) =

Railway station in Morioka, Iwate Prefecture, Japan

Kōma Station 好摩駅
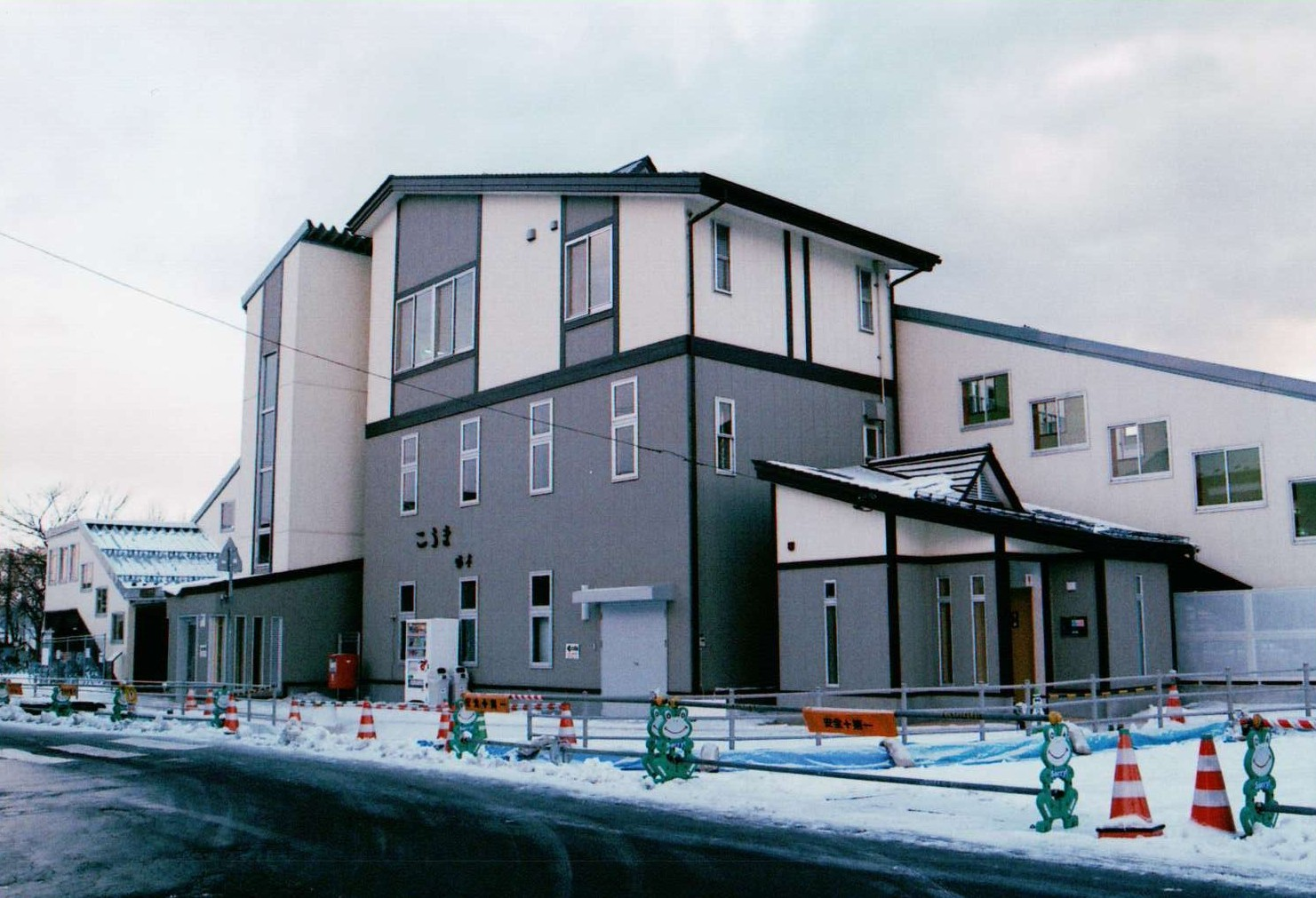
- Kōma Station in December 2011

General information
- Location: Kōma-Kamiyama 2-14, Tamayama-ku, Morioka-shi, Iwate-ken 028-4125; Japan
- Coordinates: 39°52′27.2″N 141°10′24.5″E
- Operator: Iwate Ginga Railway; JR East
- Lines: ■ Iwate Ginga Railway Line; ■ Hanawa Line
- Distance: 21.3 km from Morioka
- Platforms: 1 side + 1 island platform
- Tracks: 3

Construction
- Structure type: Elevated

Other information
- Status: Staffed

History
- Opened: September 1, 1891

Passengers
- FY2015: 1,973 daily

Services
Preceding station	JR East	Following station
Shibutami towards Morioka	Hanawa Line	Higashi-Ōbuke towards Ōdate
Preceding station	Iwate Galaxy Railway	Following station
Shibutami towards Morioka	Iwate Galaxy Railway Line	Iwate-Kawaguchi towards Metoki
Location
- Location within Japan

Kōma Station (好摩駅, Kōma-eki) is a railway station in the city of Morioka, Iwate Prefecture Japan, jointly operated by East Japan Railway Company (JR East) and the operated by the third sector Iwate Ginga Railway Company.

== Lines ==
Kōma Station is a terminal station on the JR East Hanawa Line, and is located 106.9 rail kilometers from the opposing terminus of the line at Ōdate Station in Akita Prefecture. However, most trains continue on to Morioka Station. It is also a station on the Iwate Ginga Railway Line, and is located 21.3 rail kilometers from the terminus of the line at Morioka Station.

== Station layout ==
Kōma Station is an elevated station with a single side platform and single island platform connected by footbridges, serving three tracks.

=== Platforms ===
1	■ Iwate Ginga Railway Line	for Takizawa and Morioka
1	■ Hanawa Line	for Ōbuke and Kazuno-Hanawa
2	■ Iwate Galaxy Railway Line	for Iwate-Numakunai, Ninohe, and Hachinohe
3	■ Iwate Galaxy Railway Line	for Takizawa and Morioka

== History ==
Kōma Station opened on September 1, 1891, serving the village of Tamayama, Iwate. A new station building was completed in May 2011.

== Passenger statistics ==
In fiscal 2015, the station was used by an average of 1,973 passengers daily.

== Surrounding area ==
- National Route 4
- Kōma Post Office
- Kitakami River

== See also ==
- List of railway stations in Japan
