= 1914 in France =

- Decades: 1890s; 1900s; 1910s; 1920s; 1930s
- See also: History of France; Timeline of French history; List of years in France

Events from the year 1914 in France.

== Incumbents ==
- President: Raymond Poincaré
- President of the Council of Ministers:
  - until 9 June: Gaston Doumergue
  - 9 June-13 June: Alexandre Ribot
  - starting 13 June: René Viviani

== Events ==
- 16 March – The wife of minister Joseph Caillaux shoots Gaston Calmette, the editor of Le Figaro because he threatened to publish Caillaux's love letters to her during his previous marriage; she is later acquitted by a jury.
- 26 April – French legislative election held.
- 10 May – French legislative election held.
- c. June – Blaise Diagne of Senegal becomes the first Black African representative in the French Parliament.
- 28 July – Henriette Caillaux, wife of minister Joseph Caillaux, is acquitted of the murder of Gaston Calmette by reason of crime passionnel.
- 31 July – Jean Jaurès assassinated by a French nationalist fanatic
- 3 August – Germany declares war on France.
- 9 August – Battle of Mulhouse begins, the opening attack of World War I by the French army against Germany.
- 19 August – Battle of Dornach (1914)
- 26 August – Allies withdraw from Le Cateau to Saint-Quentin, after Battle of Le Cateau.
- 29 August – French Fifth Army attack St. Quentin.
- 30 August – French Fifth Army retreat from St. Quentin.
- 2 September – The village of Moronvilliers is occupied by the Germans.
- 5 September
  - London Agreement: No member of the Triple Entente (France, the United Kingdom or Russia) may seek a separate peace with the Central Powers.
  - The First Battle of the Marne begins: 50 km north-east of Paris, the French 6th Army under General Maunoury attacks German forces closing on the city. Over 2,000,000 fight (500,000 are killed/wounded) in the Allied victory. A French and British counterattack at the Marne ends the German advance on Paris.
- 6–8 September – French Army troops are rushed from Paris to join the First Battle of the Marne using Renault Type AG taxicabs.
- 13 September – The conclusion of the Battle of Grand Couronné ends the Battle of the Frontiers, with the north-east segment of the Western Front stabilising.
- 25 September – Battle of Albert begins as part of the Race to the Sea.
- 27 September – First Battle of Artois begins.
- 28 September – The First Battle of the Aisne ends indecisively.
- 30 September – British Indian Army Expeditionary Force A arrives at Marseille for service on the Western Front.
- 1 October – Battle of Arras begins.
- 4 October – Lens is lost, as French Tenth Army fails to hold back the Germans.
- 5 October – Aerial combat of 5 October 1914
- 4 November – Britain and France declare war on the Ottoman Empire.
- 20 December – First Battle of Champagne begins.
- December – Wilhelm Apollinaris de Kostrowitzky, who writes under the nom de plume "Guillaume Apollinaire", enlists in the French Army to fight in World War I and becomes a French citizen after an August attempt at enlistment has been rejected.

== Literature ==
- Anatole France - La Révolte des anges
- Raymond Roussel - Locus Solus

== Music ==
- Gabriel Fauré - Barcarolle No. 11
- Maurice Ravel - À la manière de Borodine / Chabrier
- Erik Satie
  - Sports et divertissements
  - Peccadilles importunes
- Igor Stravinsky - Le rossignol

== Sports ==
- 28 June – The 12th Tour de France begins.

== Births ==
=== January to March ===
- 4 January – Jean-Pierre Vernant, historian and anthropologist (died 2007)
- 9 January – Lucien Bodard, reporter and writer on events in Asia (died 1998)
- 10 January – Pierre Cogan, cyclist (died 2013)
- 3 February – Michel Thomas, linguist, language teacher and decorated war veteran (died 2005)
- 17 February – René Vietto, cyclist (died 1988)
- 19 February – Jacques Dufilho, actor (died 2005)
- 28 February – Élie Bayol, motor racing driver (died 1995)
- 21 March – Paul Tortelier, cellist and composer (died 1990)

=== April to June ===
- 4 April – Marguerite Duras, writer and film director (died 1996)
- 17 April – Janine Micheau, lyric soprano opera singer (died 1976)
- 25 April – Claude Mauriac, author and journalist (died 1996)
- 26 April – Lilian Rolfe, heroine of World War II (died 1945)
- 27 April – Albert Soboul, historian (died 1982)
- 28 April – Michel Mohrt, editor, essayist, novelist and historian (died 2011)
- 8 May – Romain Gary, novelist, film director, World War II aviator and diplomat (died 1980)
- 14 May – Maurice Kriegel-Valrimont, militant communist, resistance fighter and politician (died 2006)
- 18 May
  - Pierre Balmain, fashion designer (died 1982)
  - Marcel Bernard, tennis player (died 1994)
- 16 June
  - Louis Gabrillargues, soccer player (died 1994)
  - Colette Maze, pianist (died 2023)
- 26 June – Antoine Argoud, twice attempted to assassinate Charles de Gaulle (died 2004)
- 30 June – Agnès-Marie Valois, French nun and nurse (died 2018)

=== July to September ===
- 5 July – Alain de Boissieu, Army chief-of-staff (died 2006)
- 5 July – Jean Tabaud, artist (died 1996)
- 21 July – Philippe Ariès, medievalist and historian (died 1984)
- 30 July – André Nocquet, aikido teacher (died 1999)
- 31 July – Louis de Funès, actor (died 1983)
- 19 August
  - Maurice Bourgès-Maunoury, politician and Prime Minister of France (died 1993)
  - Raymond Marcellin, politician (died 2004)
- 20 August – Yann Goulet, sculptor, Breton nationalist and war-time collaborationist with Nazi Germany (died 1999)
- 30 August – Jean Bottéro, historian (died 2007)
- 13 September – Henri Curiel, political activist (assassinated 1978)
- 23 September – Maurice Limat, science fiction author (died 2002)
- 24 September – Jean-Michel Guilcher, ethnologist (died 2017)

=== October to December ===
- 9 October – Guy Charmot, resistance fighter and doctor (died 2019)
- 22 October – André Neher, Jewish scholar and philosopher (died 1988)
- 13 November – Henri Langlois, pioneer of film preservation and restoration (died 1977)
- 21 November – Henri Laborit, physician, writer and philosopher (died 1995)
- 4 December – Claude Renoir, cinematographer (died 1993)
- 5 December – Odette Joyeux, actress and writer (died 2000)
- 18 December – Aimé Teisseire, military officer (died 2008)

== Deaths ==
- 18 January – Georges Picquart, army officer and Minister of War, exposed the truth in the Dreyfus Affair (born 1854)
- 30 January – Paul Déroulède, author and politician (born 1846)
- 13 February – Alphonse Bertillon, police officer and forensic scientist (born 1853)
- 25 March – Frédéric Mistral, poet, shared the Nobel Prize in Literature in 1904 (born 1830)
- 31 July – Jean Jaurès, socialist and pacifist (assassinated) (born 1859)
- 3 August – Louis Couturat, logician, mathematician, philosopher and linguist (born 1868)
- 4 August – Hubertine Auclert, feminist and campaigner for women's suffrage (born 1848)
- 4 August – Jules Lemaître, critic and dramatist (born 1853)
- 3 September – Albéric Magnard, composer (born 1865)
- 5 September – Charles Péguy, poet, essayist and editor (born 1873)
- 6 September – Alfred Mayssonnié, rugby union player (killed in action) (born 1884)
- 16 September – Louis Bach, Association football player (killed in action) (born 1883)
- 23 September – Gaston Lane, rugby union player (killed in action) (born 1883)
- 26 September – Alain-Fournier (Lt Henri-Alban Fournier), novelist (killed in action) (born 1886)
- 2 October – Joé Anduran, rugby union player (killed in action) (born 1882)
- 25 December – Jean Alfred Fournier, dermatologist (born 1832)
