= July 1914 =

Month of 1914

<<	July 1914					>>
Su	Mo	Tu	We	Th	Fr	Sa
			1	2	3	4
5	6	7	8	9	10	11
12	13	14	15	16	17	18
19	20	21	22	23	24	25
26	27	28	29	30	31

The following events occurred in July 1914:
On the war, see July Crisis and Causes of World War I.

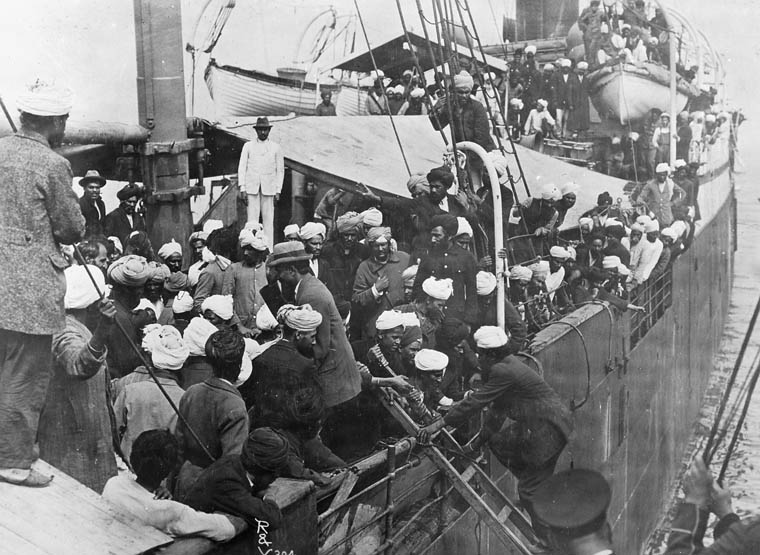
Sikhs aboard Komagata Maru in Vancouver's Burrard Inlet, 1914. Courts in British Columbia ruled the ship had to leave Canadian waters.

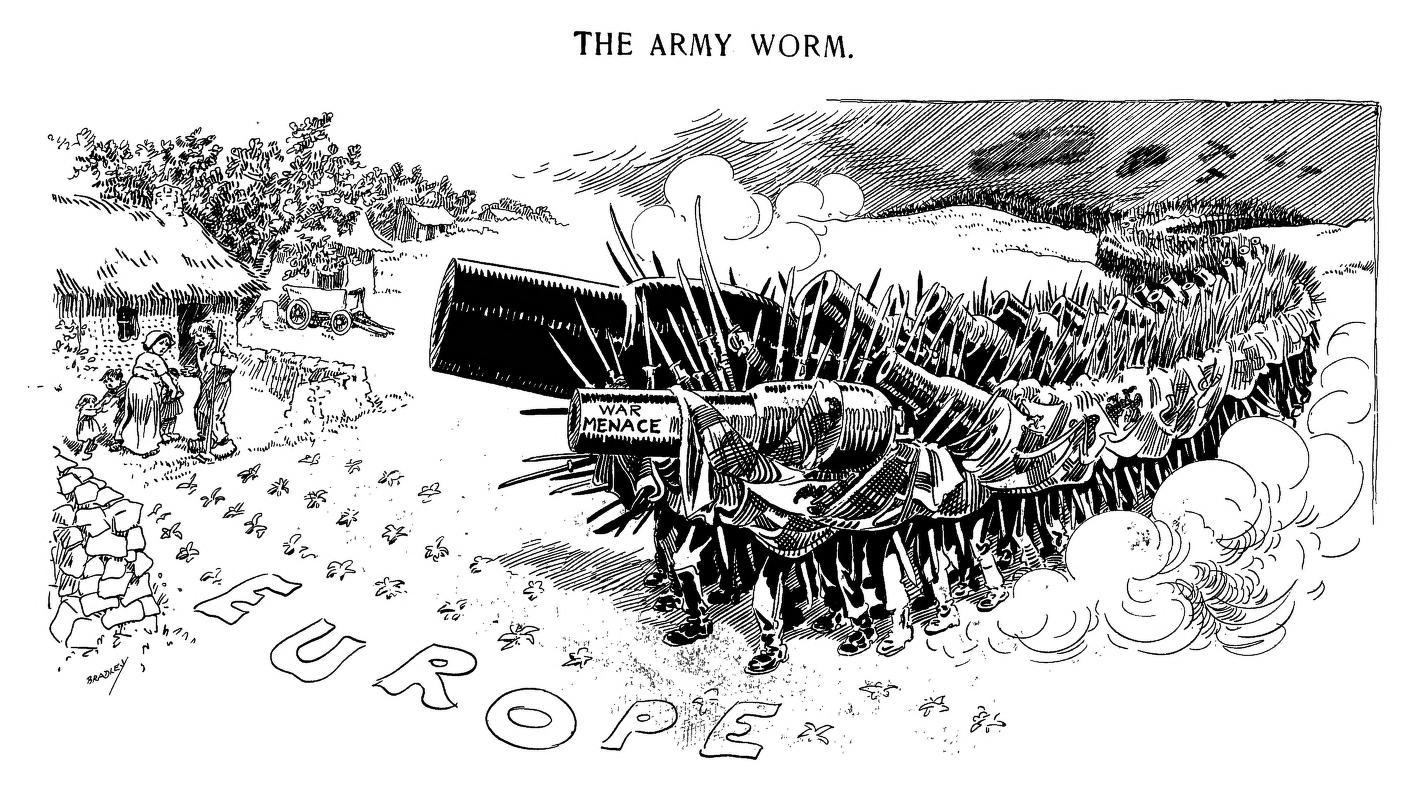
Cartoon titled "The Army Worm" in the U.S. newspaper Chicago Daily News depicting "War Menace" threatening the people of Europe, 1914

== July 1, 1914 (Wednesday) ==
- July Crisis – Austria-Hungary received confirmation from Germany that they could expect full support from their ally should they choose to wage war against Serbia in response to Serbian nationalists assassinating Archduke Franz Ferdinand of Austria. With some diplomatic reports alleging Dragutin Dimitrijević, Chief of Serbian Military Intelligence, and others in the Serbian government being involved in the assassination plot, Russian Ambassador Nicholas Hartwig met with officials in Belgrade to advise on the best maneuvers for Serbia to take during the crisis.
- Norfolk Island in the Pacific Ocean officially became a territory under Australia.
- The Naval Wing of the British Royal Flying Corps was separated from the Royal Air Force and established as a separate service, the Royal Naval Air Service, under the control of the Royal Navy.
- The United States Navy established its first air department, the Office of Naval Aeronautics, Division of Operations, predecessor to the Bureau of Aeronautics.
- Canadian Arctic Expedition – Survivors of the Karluk shipwreck raised the Canadian flag on Wrangel Island in the Bering Sea in honour of Dominion Day. There were now 14 survivors of the original 25 people that survived the sinking in January. Fortunately, Karluk captain Robert Bartlett had reached Alaska and was now arranging rescue ships.
- The National Party was founded in Bloemfontein, South Africa with a focus on Afrikaner nationalism.
- The precursor to the Hanawa railroad opened in the Akita Prefecture, Japan, with stations Ōgita and Ōdate serving the line.
- Furka Oberalp Railway opened stations Fiesch, Gletsch and Oberwald in Switzerland.
- While re-shooting scenes for the western Across the Border in Colorado, actress Grace McHugh fell into the Arkansas River while being filmed crossing the water on horseback. Owen Carter, the production's cinematographer, dived in to save McHugh, but both drowned. Their deaths resulted in a push to develop professional stunt actors to handle dangerous action sequences in movie production.
- Sandstad Municipality and Stemshaug Municipality in Norway were established.
- The city of Lynn Haven, Florida was established.
- Born:
  - Ahmed Hassan al-Bakr, Iraqi state leader, fourth President of Iraq; in Tikrit, Ottoman Empire (present-day Iraq) (d. 1982)
  - Stephen Juba, Canadian politician, 37th Mayor of Winnipeg, first Ukrainian Canadian to hold political high office; in Winnipeg, Canada (d. 1993)
  - Sara Seegar, American actress, best known for the role of "Mrs Wilson" in the 1960s TV series Dennis the Menace; as Sarah Seegar, in Greentown, Indiana, United States (d. 1990)
  - Christl Cranz, German alpine skier, gold medal winner at the 1936 Winter Olympics; in Brussels, Belgium (d. 2004)
  - Orli Wald, French-German resistance fighter, member of the German Resistance during World War II, known as the "Angel of Auschwitz" which she escaped in 1945; as Aurelia Torgau, in Bourell, France (d. 1962)
- Died: Edmund Payne, 50, British actor, major comedic lead in many of the 1800s Edwardian musical comedies (b. 1865)

== July 2, 1914 (Thursday) ==
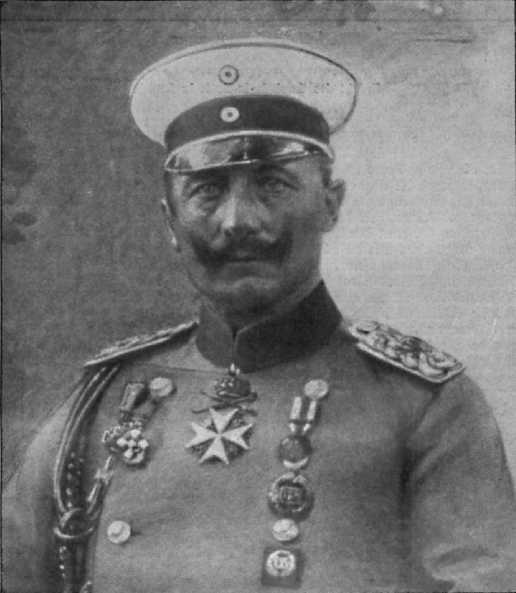
Wilhelm II of Germany

- July Crisis – Kaiser Wilhelm received recommendation from the German military for Austria-Hungary to attack Serbia as quickly as possible, since Germany was more prepared to mobilize than either Russia or France.
- After delays, the first issue of the Vorticism art magazine Blast was distributed.
- Born:
  - Frederick Fennell, American conductor, best known for his recordings with the Eastman Wind Ensemble; in Cleveland, United States (d. 2004)
  - Hannes Bok, American artist, best known for cover art for pulp and science fiction magazines including Weird Tales and Other Worlds; as Wayne Francis Woodward, in Kansas City, Missouri, United States (d. 1964)
  - Erich Topp, German naval officer, commander of U-boat U-552 that sank USS Reuben James, recipient of the Knight's Cross of the Iron Cross; in Hanover, German Empire (present-day Germany) (d. 2005)
- Died: Joseph Chamberlain, 77, British politician, Secretary of State for the Colonies from 1895 to 1903 (b. 1836)

== July 3, 1914 (Friday) ==
- The Simla Convention was sealed by Great Britain and Tibet despite objections from China, which rejected the Accord entirely. British and Tibetan plenipotentiaries attached a note denying China any privileges under the Accord and sealed it as a bilateral agreement. The Accord redefined borders between Tibet and British India. It also divided Tibet into two political regions, with the "outer" territory under Tibetan rule from the capital of Lhasa while the "inner" region fell under Chinese control.
- A state funeral was held for Archduke Franz Ferdinand of Austria in Vienna, with Emperor Franz Joseph and other members of the imperial family in attendance.
- The borough of Paxtang, Pennsylvania was established.
- Born:
  - Pat Pattle, South African air force officer, commander of Royal Air Force squadrons No. 33 and No. 80 during World War II; as Marmaduke Thomas St John Pattle, in Butterworth, Eastern Cape, South Africa (killed at the Battle of Athens, 1941)
  - Buddy Rosar, American baseball player, catcher for the New York Yankees, Cleveland Indians, Philadelphia Athletics, and Boston Red Sox from 1939 to 1951, 1941 World Series champion; as Warren Vincent Rosar, in Buffalo, New York, United States (d. 1994)
- Died: Henry Willard Denison, 68, American diplomat, U.S. ambassador to Japan during the Meiji era (b. 1846)

== July 4, 1914 (Saturday) ==
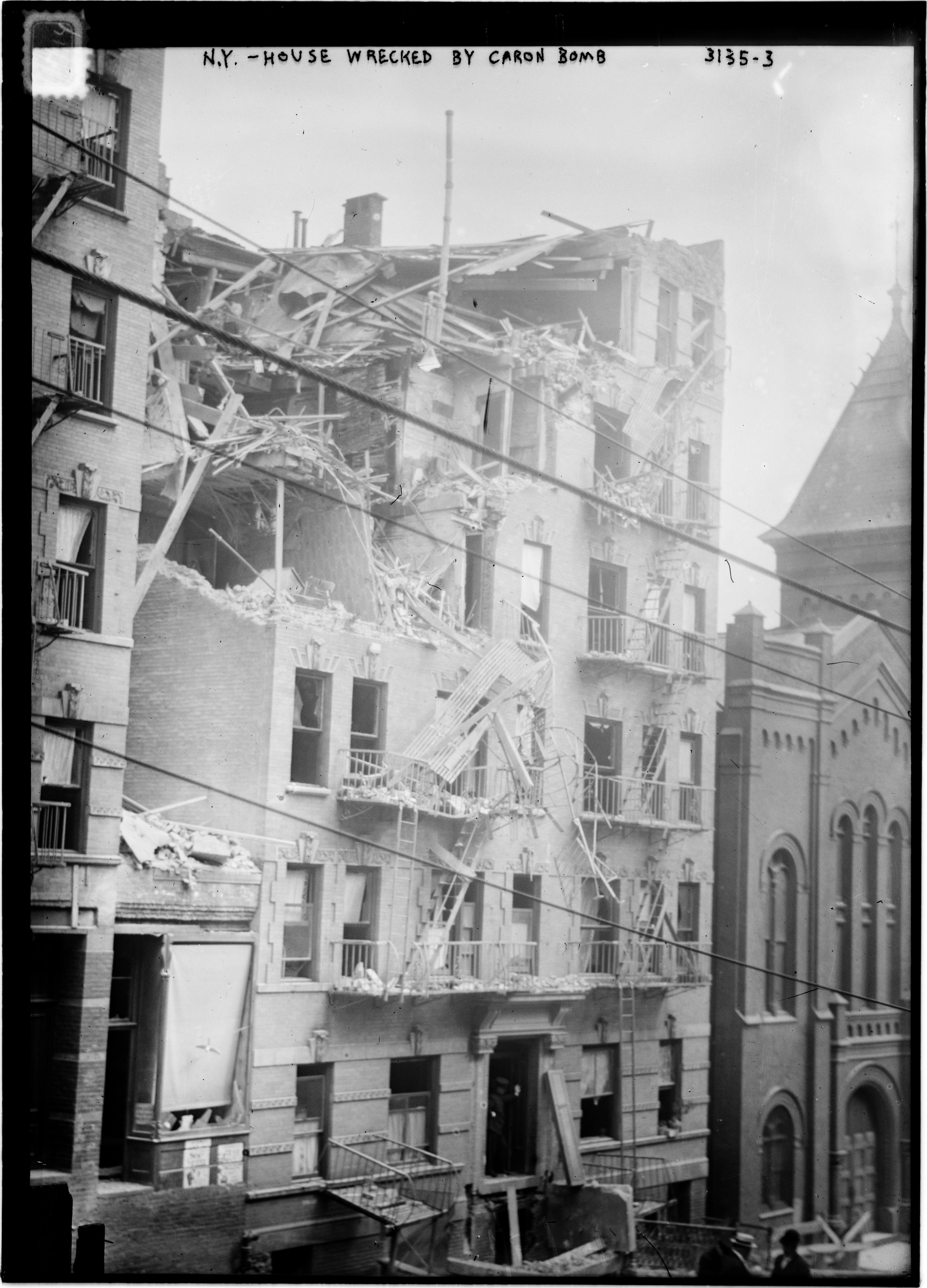
House damaged by bomb explosion at 1626 Lexington Avenue in Manhattan, July 4, 1914

- July Crisis – On the same day Archduke Franz Ferdinand of Austria and Sophie, Duchess of Hohenberg were interred at Artstetten Castle, Kaiser Wilhelm declared that he was entirely for "settling accounts with Serbia".
- Zaian War – A tribal force of 500 Zayanes attacked a French convoy south of Khenifra, Morocco. French soldiers repulsed the attack at a loss of 11 killed and 30 wounded.
- Lexington Avenue explosion – Arthur Caron, a member of Industrial Workers of the World, and three other people were killed in New York City when a bomb intended to kill John D. Rockefeller exploded prematurely in an apartment used as a base for the assassination plot.
- The 38th staging of the Wimbledon Championships was held in England, but would not be staged for another four years due to World War I.
  - Australian tennis player Norman Brookes defeated New Zealander Anthony Wilding with scores 6–4, 6–4, and 7–5 in the men's singles finals.
  - The two contenders in the men's singles finals teamed up on men's doubles finals and defeated Great Britain's Herbert Roper Barrett and Charles P. Dixon with scores of 6–1, 6–1, 5–7, and 8–6.
  - British tennis player Dorothea Douglass Lambert Chambers defeated compatriot Ethel Thomson Larcombe in the women's singles finals with scores of 7–5 and 6–4.
  - Larcombe also fared poorly with partner Edith Hannam in the women's doubles finals, with both getting beaten by American tennis player Elizabeth Ryan and British partner Agnes Morton with scores of 6–1 and 6–3.
  - Larcombe did walk away with a championship title in the mixed doubles finals with James Parke, with the two defeating Wilding and French partner Marguerite Broquedis with scores of 4–6, 6–4, and 6–2.
- The Smith Tower opened in Seattle, the oldest skyscraper still standing in the city. At 35 stories and for a total height of 143 m (469 ft), it was the tallest building west of the Mississippi. Over 4,000 people rode the elevator to the top floor for the view on opening day. Its height was beaten in 1931 when the Kansas City Power and Light Building was completed, but it remained the tallest building on the west coast until the opening of the Space Needle in 1962.
- The Shiawassee District Library opened on the Fourth of July in Owosso, Michigan using funds from the Carnegie Foundation.
- The Paris Yiddish-language labour movement journal The Jewish Worker published its last issue, after its pacifist stance led to a break away from the rest of the French labour movement. Its counterpart for the General Jewish Labour Bund in Vilna, Lithuania folded the same month.
- Died: Michele Catti, 59, Italian artist, member of the Belle Époque movement (b. 1855)

== July 5, 1914 (Sunday) ==
- July Crisis – A council was held at Potsdam, where leaders from Austria-Hungary and Germany met to discuss possibilities of war with Serbia, Russia, and France, concluding it had become necessary "to eliminate Serbia" in spite of expected resistance from her allies. Their option to go to war was further reinforced by letters from Helmuth von Moltke, Chief of the German General Staff, and Emperor Franz Joseph that both stated war was necessary to preserve the monarchy.
  - Based on further police interrogations, Governor of Bosnia and Herzegovina Oskar Potiorek telegraphed Vienna to report Serbian Major Voja Tankosić had given instruction to the Serbian nationalists involved in the assassination of Archduke Franz Ferdinand.
  - A revised letter from Austria-Hungary was sent to Germany proposing an alliance with Austria-Hungary, Germany, Bulgaria and the Ottoman Empire against Russia, with the addition of action against Serbia. Austrian Emperor Franz Joseph added his own letter to Kaiser Wilhelm where he advocated ending Serbia as a political power.
- The last species of laughing owl was found in New Zealand, after which the species was categorized as extinct.
- Born:
  - Jean Tabaud, French artist, known for portraits of many famous families including the Fords and the Duponts; in Saujon, France (d. 1996)
  - John Thomas Dunlop, American public servant, 14th United States Secretary of Labor; in Placerville, California, United States (d. 2003)

== July 6, 1914 (Monday) ==
- Komagata Maru incident – The British Columbia Court of Appeal gave a unanimous judgement that under new orders-in-council, it had no authority to interfere with the decisions of the Department of Immigration and Colonization, allowing the Canadian government legal standing to order Vancouver harbor's tug Sea Lion to push the Japanese vessel out to sea with more than 300 Sikhs and other British Indian subjects on board.
- July Crisis – British Foreign Secretary Sir Edward Grey received warning from German ambassador Karl Max of likely war in the Balkans, but Grey was optimistic "that a peaceful solution would be reached" through Anglo-German co-operation. Meanwhile, Kaiser Wilhelm went on his annual cruise of the North Sea at the insistence of his courtiers, even though he wished to remain in Berlin until the crisis was resolved.
- The 6th French Grand Prix, organised by the Automobile Club of France (ACF), was run at Lyon over 752.58 km (37.629 km x 20 laps). The winner was Christian Lautenschlager of Germany driving a Mercedes 18/100 in 7:08:18.4. The race was retrospectively referred to as the XIV Grand Prix de l´ACF.
- Celebrated Uruguayan poet Delmira Agustini was murdered in her Montevideo home by her ex-husband Enrique Job Reyes, a month after the couple had divorced. Reyes shot her twice before turning the gun on himself. They had married in 1913 but Agustini left Reyes a month later. On the centennial of her death, the city of Montevideo unveiled a statue of her by artist Martín Sastre in memory of the poet and other victims of gender-based violence.
- A French fishing vessel in the English Channel off Boulogne, France found a body floating in the water. Although they did not retrieve the corpse, the crew described the body's clothing as belonging to a pilot and recovered from it a road map of southern England. The evidence suggested the body was of Gustav Hamel, who disappeared while flying on 23 May.
- Born:
  - Viola Desmond, Canadian activist, known for her court case that challenged racial segregation in Nova Scotia; in Halifax, Canada (d. 1965)
  - Vincent J. McMahon, America professional wrestling promoter, manager of the Capitol Wrestling Corporation (now WWE), father of Vince McMahon; in New York City, United States (d. 1984)

== July 7, 1914 (Tuesday) ==
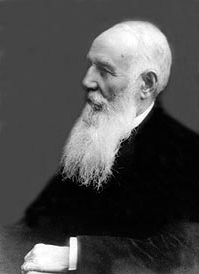
Nikola Pašić, Prime Minister of Serbia

- July Crisis – Austria-Hungary convened a Council of Ministers, including Ministers for Foreign Affairs and War, the Chief of the General Staff and Naval Commander-in-Chief; the Council lasted from 11.30 a.m. to 6.15 p.m.
- Serbian Prime Minister Nikola Pašić contradicted previous statements by his diplomats saying Serbia had warned Austria-Hungary about plots to assassinate Archduke Franz Ferdinand, saying to the Hungarian daily newspaper Az Est that his foreign affairs office made no such warnings (and repeating it again to the Paris Edition of the New York Herald on July 20).
- The Canadian Pacific Railway, owner of the ocean liner Empress of Ireland which sank in May, took possession of SS Storstad, the vessel that collided with the "Empress", and then sold it for $175,000 as part of its $2,000,000 lawsuit for damages against the Swedish ship's owners A. F. Klaveness & Co.
- French Navy destroyer Mousqueton sank after it collided with a fellow submarine in the Mediterranean Sea, with all 26 crew rescued.
- American passenger ship Great Northern was launched by William Cramp & Sons in Philadelphia to serve the Pacific Northwest seaway.
- Regular scheduled service began on the Portland–Lewiston Interurban in Maine.
- Two counties were established in Georgia: Bacon County with its county seat in Alma, and Barrow County with its county seat in Winder.
- Freddie Welsh defeated Willie Ritchie in over 20 rounds to win the World Lightweight Championship in London. Welsh held the title until 1917.
- Born:
  - Harry Strom, Canadian politician, 9th Premier of Alberta; in Burdett, Alberta, Canada (d. 1984)
  - Anil Biswas, Indian film composer, known for scores in Kismet and Pardesi; in Barisal, British India (present-day Bangladesh) (d. 2003)

== July 8, 1914 (Wednesday) ==
- July Crisis – The Council of Ministers for Austria-Hungary sent two recommended options to Emperor Franz Joseph on how to handle its crisis with Serbia. The first option was a surprise attack against the Balkan country and the second option was to place demands on Serbia before mobilization to provide a proper "juridical basis for a declaration of war".
- Mexican Revolution – Mexican forces with revolutionary leader Álvaro Obregón defeated 6,000 federal troops sent out from Guadalajara to halt his progress.
- While exiled in Tokyo, Chinese revolutionary Sun Yat-sen reorganized the Kuomintang party under the new name Chinese Revolutionary Party after Yuan Shikai, self-proclaimed emperor of China, outlawed the political party.
- John D. Rockefeller celebrated his 75th birthday playing golf in a foursome with Frank C. Folger, president of Standard Oil, Elias Johnson of New York and A.L. Gifford of Tarrytown. Rockfeller won the game, remarking "It takes us young boys to win."
- Born:
  - Jyoti Basu, Indian politician, 6th Chief Minister of West Bengal; as Jyotirindra Basu, in Calcutta, British India (present-day Kolkata, India) (d. 2010)
  - Billy Eckstine, jazz musician and singer, known for hits "I Apologize" and "My Foolish Heart"; as William Eckstein, in Pittsburgh, United States (d. 1993)

== July 9, 1914 (Thursday) ==
- Mexican Revolution – Rebel soldiers under command of Álvaro Obregón captured Guadalajara. The revolutionaries routed 12,000 federal soldiers, killing 8,000 and capturing 5,000 more along with much of the federal army's artillery. The battle effectively ended the Victoriano Huerta regime.
- July Crisis – Austrian Emperor Franz Joseph was advised the council was working on an ultimatum containing demands that were designed to be rejected, thus ensuring a war without the "odium of attacking Serbia without warning, put her in the wrong."
- Charlie Chaplin starred as a hapless dental assistant in Laughing Gas.
- Born: Willi Stoph, German politician, Prime Minister of East Germany from 1964 to 1973, and 1976 to 1989; as Wilhelm Stoph, in Berlin, German Empire (present-day Germany) (d. 1999)
- Died: Henry Emmerson, 60, Canadian politician, 9th Premier of New Brunswick (b. 1853)

== July 10, 1914 (Friday) ==
- The Provisional Government of Ulster met for the first time in the Ulster Hall, where it vowed to keep Ulster in trust for the King and the British constitution.
- July Crisis – Nicholas Hartwig, Russian Minister to Serbia, died suddenly while visiting Austrian minister Baron Wladimir Giesl von Gieslingen at the Austrian Legation in Belgrade.
- Rodmond Roblin and his Progressive Conservative Party of Manitoba won the majority of seats in the Legislative Assembly of Manitoba during the Canadian province's general election.
- German Reinhold Böhm flew his Albatros-biplane nonstop for 24 hours and 12 minutes without refueling. His one-man-flight record lasted until 1927.
- The renowned Herald Square Theatre on Broadway was demolished to make room for expansion of the Garment District in New York City.
- Weekly newspaper The Avon Gazette and York Times began publication in York, Western Australia, Australia.
- The city of Fillmore, California was incorporated.
- Born:
  - Paul Vario, American gangster, member of the Lucchese crime family, famously inspired the "Paul Cicero" character in the movie Goodfellas; in New York City, United States (d. 1988)
  - Joe Shuster, Canadian-American comic book artist, co-creator of Superman with Jerry Siegel; as Joseph Shuster, in Toronto, Canada (d. 1992)
  - Thein Pe Myint, Burmese journalist, author of Wartime Traveller and Over the Ashes; in Budalin, British Burma (present-day Myanmar) (d. 1978)

== July 11, 1914 (Saturday) ==
- July Crisis – The German foreign office sent a telegram on behalf of Kaiser Wilhelm congratulating King Peter of Serbia on his birthday. Wilhelm ordered the goodwill telegram to be sent even though the German government knew of Austria-Hungary's intention to provoke war with Serbia: "As Vienna has so far inaugurated no action of any sort against Belgrade, the omission of the customary telegram would be too noticeable and might be the cause of premature uneasiness.... It should be sent."
- USS Nevada, the United States Navy's first "super-dreadnought" battleship, was launched, in sponsorship by Miss Eleanor Anne Seibert, niece of Nevada Governor Tasker Oddie and a descendant of the first Secretary of the Navy, Benjamin Stoddert. The launch was attended by several prominent members of the government, including Governor Oddie, Governor David I. Walsh of Massachusetts, Senator Key Pittman of Nevada, Secretary of the Navy Josephus Daniels and Assistant Secretary of the Navy Franklin D. Roosevelt, who would later become the 32nd President of the United States.
- Over 5,000 attended a rally in Union Square, Manhattan, called by the Anti-Militarist League to commemorate the anarchists killed in the July 4 Lexington Avenue explosion.
- Baseball legend Babe Ruth made his major league debut with the Boston Red Sox.
- American aviator Walter L. Brock won the London-Paris return air race.
- Publisher William P. Beard, an ally to South Carolina politician Coleman Livingston Blease, ran the first edition of the weekly newspaper Abbeville Scimitar in Abbeville, South Carolina. The paper became notorious for racist editorials, including the endorsement of lynching. The paper was closed in 1917 after Beard was convicted of sedition for opposing the United States entrance to World War I on racist grounds.
- The Karkamış to Ceylanpınar line of the Berlin–Baghdad railway opened in south-eastern Turkey.

== July 12, 1914 (Sunday) ==
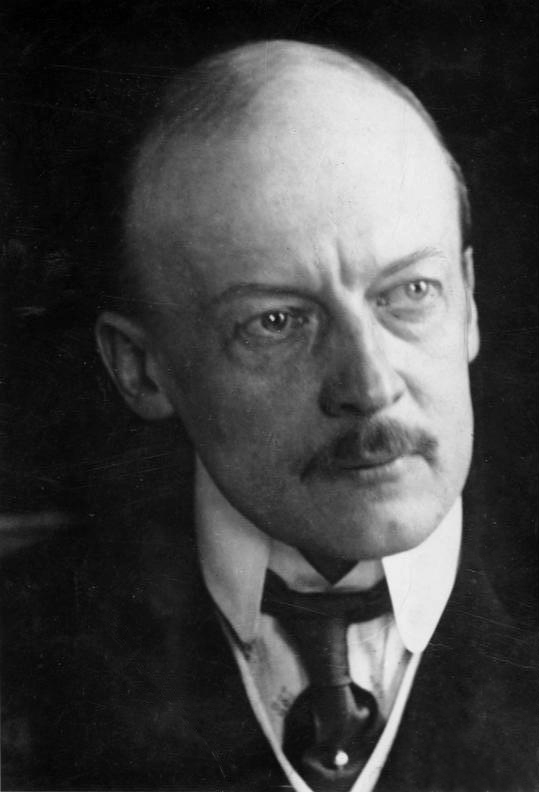
Austro-Hungarian Foreign Minister Leopold Berchtold

- July Crisis – In response to pressure from the German government on Austria-Hungary's Council of Ministers to resolve their indecision about whether to choose war or peace, Foreign Minister Leopold Berchtold presented the German foreign office with a draft of the ultimatum which would be presented to Serbia after the summit between French President Raymond Poincaré and Tsar Nicholas.
  - Muhamed Mehmedbašić was the last of the group of assassins to be apprehended for the assassination of Archduke Franz Ferdinand. He escaped to Montenegro during unrest following the death of the Archduke but was arrested and imprisoned in Nikšić. After admitting his involvement in the assassination plot, Mehmedbašić escaped two days later to Serbia and eluded capture throughout the entire war.
- Rebel forces captured Berat in southern Albania.
- Striking miners at a coal mine in Hartford, Arkansas rioted after shots were fired at their homes. The violence resulted in two deaths.
- A Chinese naval gunboat exploded in Shanghai harbor, killing 35 naval cadets.
- Casale beat Lazio with an aggregate score of 9–1 to win the Italian Football Championship.
- An Ilya Muromet airplane designed by Igor Sikorsky completed a round-trip from Saint Petersburg to Kiev, completing the 1200 km route in a record time of 14 hours and 38 minutes to Kiev and back in less than 13 hours. For achieving a world record in flight, Sikorsky was awarded the Order of Saint Vladimir.
- The Russian Empire national football team played their last international game, tying Norway 1–1 in Oslo. The outbreak of World War I halted plans to expand a football league in the Russian Empire.
- Died: Horace Harmon Lurton, 70, American judge, Associate Justice of the Supreme Court of the United States from 1909 to 1914 (b. 1844)

== July 13, 1914 (Monday) ==
- July Crisis – The Austrian investigation into the assassination of Archduke Franz Ferdinand reported to Vienna there was little evidence to support the Serbian government in general was accessory to the plot.
- Canadian Arctic Expedition – Captain Robert Bartlett of HMCS Karluk departed from Alaska on the Bear for Wrangel Island in the Bering Sea after obtaining permission from the United States government. Unknown to him, there were now only 14 survivors from the shipwreck still on the island.
- Felix Ysagun Manalo registers the Iglesia ni Cristo (Church of Christ) as Iglesia ni Kristo with the government of the Philippines.
- Born: Franz von Werra, Swiss-German Luftwaffe pilot, only German prisoner of war to successfully escape from an Allied prison camp and return to Germany, recipient of the Knight's Cross of the Iron Cross; in Leuk, Switzerland (killed in plane crash, 1941)
- Died: Joan Röell, 69, Dutch state leader, Prime Minister of the Netherlands from 1894 to 1897 (b. 1844)

== July 14, 1914 (Tuesday) ==
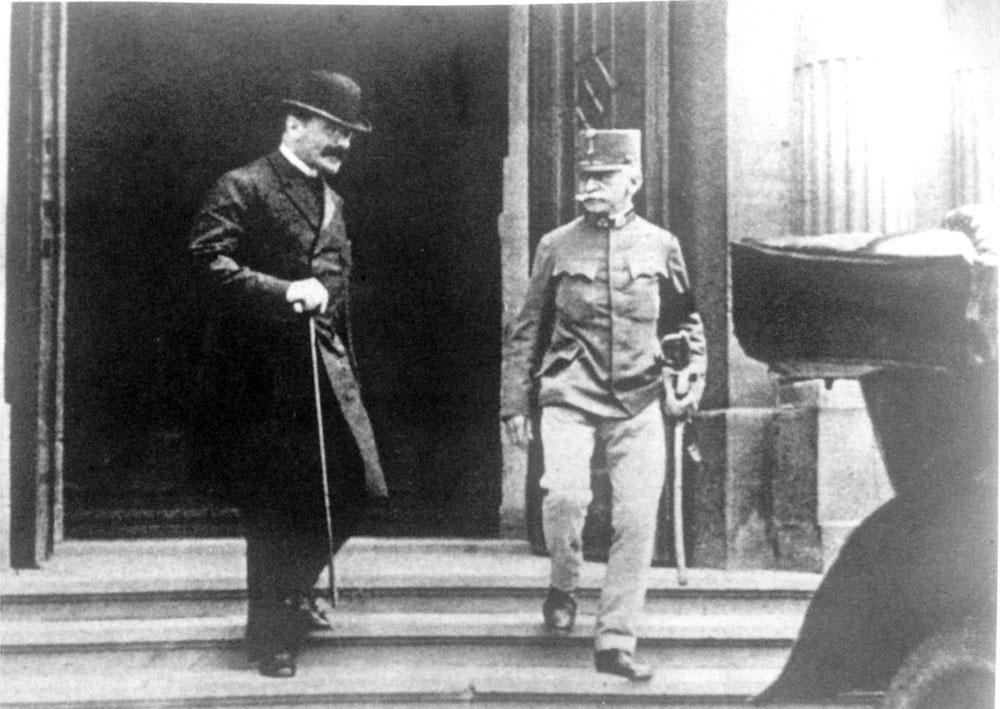
Hungarian Prime Minister István Tisza and Chief of the Army General Staff Conrad von Hötzendorf in Vienna, 15 July 1914

- The Government of Ireland Bill completed its passage through the House of Lords of the United Kingdom. It allowed Ulster counties to vote on whether or not they wish to participate in Home Rule from Dublin.
- July Crisis – Hungarian Prime Minister István Tisza broke after holding out for days for a peaceful solution with Serbia and agreed with the rest of the Council of Ministers to support war, since he feared a policy of peace would lead to Germany renouncing the alliance with Austria-Hungary.
- The Government Polytechnic of Nagpur was established in Maharashtra, India.
- Education leader Dorothy de la Hey founded Queen Mary's College in Madras, India, the third women's college in the country.
- Born:
  - George Putnam, American news reporter and news anchor, anchored for all four independent news stations in Los Angeles; in Breckenridge, Minnesota, United States (d. 2008)
  - Wim Hora Adema, Dutch author, co-founder of the feminist magazine Opzij; in Leeuwarderadeel, Netherlands (d. 1998)
- Died: Maria Zambaco, 71, Greek artist and model for the Pre-Raphaelites (b. 1843)

== July 15, 1914 (Wednesday) ==
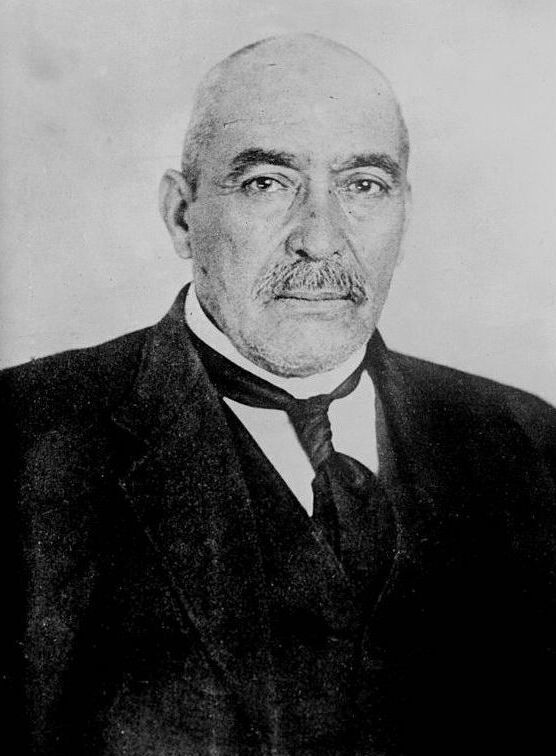
Victoriano Huerta resigned as President of Mexico

- Mexican Revolution – Victoriano Huerta resigned as president of Mexico and left for Coatzacoalcos, Veracruz. Francisco S. Carvajal succeeded him as the 36th President of Mexico, holding the office for a month while power was transitioned to Venustiano Carranza.
- Doctors in Tyumen, Russia declared Grigori Rasputin out of medical danger as the monk and spiritual adviser to the Romanov royal family recovered from an assassination attempt in Siberia. Rasputin was attacked and stabbed in the abdomen by a peasant woman who believed he was spreading temptation among the innocent. The Tsar sent his own royal physician to Tyumen to treat Rasputin.
- Bowring Park was officially opened by Prince Arthur in St. John's, Newfoundland.
- Born:
  - Akhtar Hameed Khan, Pakistani social scientist, pioneer of micro-crediting in developing countries; in Agra, British India (present-day India) (d. 1999)
  - Gavin Maxwell, Scottish naturalist and leader researcher in otters, author of Ring of Bright Water; Elrig, Scotland (d. 1969)
  - Frank Headlam, Australian air force officer, commander of the Royal Australian Air Force Air Command and Support Command during the 1960s, commander of the No. 2 Squadron during World War II, recipient of the Order of the Bath and Order of the British Empire; in Launceston, Tasmania, Australia (d. 1976)

== July 16, 1914 (Thursday) ==
- July Crisis – The Russian ambassador to Austria-Hungary warned Saint Petersburg that "the Austro-Hungarian government at the conclusion of the inquiry intends to make certain demands on Belgrade" and would be deemed "unacceptable" by Russia.
- The Congressional Research Service was established as the main public policy research arm for the United States Congress.
- Maurice Guillaux left Melbourne to fly to Sydney in a Blériot monoplane in the first delivery of airmail. He arrived in Sydney on July 18 after nine and a half hours of flying time.
- The Sopwith Type 807 made its maiden flight as a landplane before it was outfitted with a floatplane undercarriage.
- The Ural State Mining University was established in Yekaterinburg, Russia.
- The first Japanese philatelic magazine Yuraku was published as the organ of The Yurakukai (Philatelic Society of Japan).
- Died: Montgomery Schuyler, 70, American arts journalist, columnist for The New York Times and managing editor for Harper's Weekly from 1885 to 1887 (b. 1843)

== July 17, 1914 (Friday) ==
- July Crisis – The quartermaster general of the Imperial German Army wrote to Foreign Minister Gottlieb von Jagow to confirm, "I can move at a moment's notice. We in the General Staff are ready: there is nothing more for us to do at this juncture."
- The National Hydrocarbon Company was established in Des Plaines, Illinois, evolving into the energy company UOP LLC.
- The Vickers F.B.5 aircraft was first flown and became the primary military aircraft for the No. 6 Squadron of the Royal Flying Corps during the first months of World War I.
- After a valiant attempt rebelling against press censorship by the Russian government, Yiddish journalists in Saint Petersburg were forced to shut down the bi-weekly Undzer Tsayt (Our Times) again, not long after their original paper, Di Tsayt (The Time), was muzzled in June.
- Born:
  - Eleanor Steber, American opera singer, known for her collaboration with the Metropolitan Opera; in Wheeling, West Virginia, United States (d. 1990)
  - Paul Brand, British-American physician, lead researcher in treating leprosy; in Tamil Nadu, British India (present-day India) (d. 2003)
  - James Purdy, American writer, author of Cabot Wright Begins, Eustace Chisholm & the Works; in Hicksville, Ohio, United States (d. 2009)
  - Paul Lomami-Tshibamba, Congolese writer, noted contributor to Voice of the Congoles; in Brazzaville, French Equatorial Africa (present-day Republic of the Congo) (d. 1985)
- Died: Luis Uribe, 66, Chilean naval officer, Vice-Admiral of the Chilean Navy and a hero of the War of the Pacific (b. 1847)

== July 18, 1914 (Saturday) ==
- July Crisis – In response to rumors about an Austrian ultimatum, Serbian Prime Minister Nikola Pašić stated that he would not accept any measures that compromised Serbian sovereignty.
- United States Congress created an Aviation Section in the United States Army Signal Corps to replace its aeronautical division, giving definitive status to its air service for the first time.
- British monarch King George inspected the British fleet at Spithead, Hampshire, England which included 260 Royal Navy ships and 17 seaplanes.
- Spectator seats for the trial of Henriette Caillaux, wife of French minister Joseph Caillaux, for the murder of newspaper editor Gaston Calmette were reported to be going for as high as $US 200.
- Labor activist Joe Hill was sentenced to death by a Utah state jury for the alleged murders of Salt Lake City store owner John G. Morrison and his son in January despite tenuous evidence.
- Mahatma Gandhi left South Africa for Great Britain en route to India.
- Born:
  - Gino Bartali, Italian road cyclist, three-time winner of the Giro d'Italia and two-time champion of the Tour de France; in Florence, Kingdom of Italy (present-day Italy) (d. 2000)
  - Jo Cals, Dutch state leader, Prime Minister of the Netherlands from 1965 to 1966; as Jozef Maria Laurens Theo Cals, in Roermond, Netherlands (d. 1971)
  - Mack Robinson, American athlete, silver medalist at the 1936 Summer Olympics, older brother to Jackie Robinson; as Matthew MacKenzie Robinson, in Cairo, Georgia, United States (d. 2000)

== July 19, 1914 (Sunday) ==
- Komagata Maru incident – The tugboat Sea Lion, with 35 armed immigration officers and 125 Vancouver police officers on board, attempted to force the Japanese vessel from Vancouver harbour. Passengers on the ship resisted, pelting the officers with coal and bricks while another with an ax chopped at a line the tug boat used to tie to the ship. When a gunman on board the Komagata Maru opened fire, the Sea Lion backed off.
- July Crisis – The Council of Ministers in Vienna finalized the wording of the ultimatum to be presented to Serbia.
- British monarch King George summoned a conference to discuss the issues from the Irish Home Rule movement. The meetings lasted from July 21 to 24 without reaching consensus.
- Born:
  - Marius Russo, American baseball player, pitcher for the New York Yankees from 1939 to 1946; in New York City, United States (d. 2005)
  - Horace Smithy, American surgeon, performed the first heart valve operation; in Norfolk, Virginia, United States (d. 1948)
- Died: Johann Puch, 52, Slovene mechanical engineer, founder of auto manufacturer Puch AG (b. 1862)

== July 20, 1914 (Monday) ==
- July Crisis – Germany began making preparations for war by mobilizing the Imperial German Navy and informing shipping companies to start withdrawing their ships from foreign waters back to German ports.
- The trial of Henriette Caillaux began in Paris, with the accused murderer reportedly being kept in the same cell that held Marie Antoinette during the French Revolution between court appearances.
- U.S. Navy destroyer O'Brien was launched from the William Cramp & Sons shipyard in Philadelphia.
- The Tonopah and Tidewater Railroad Company dissolved after terminating its 1908 agreement with Bullfrog Goldfield Railroad.
- The Echigo railroad was extended in Niigata Prefecture, Japan, with stations Aōzu serving the line.
- The final issue of The Worker's Life was published as part of a symbolic decision in the face of the outbreak of World War I.
- The village of Highland, Alberta was incorporated before it was renamed Delia a year later.
- Born:
  - Dobri Dobrev, Bulgarian philanthropist, collected an estimated 80,000 Bulgarian lev (40,000 euros) for charitable causes at the Cathedral of Alexander Nevsky in Sofia, Bulgaria from 2000 to 2018; in Bailovo, Kingdom of Bulgaria (d. 2018)
  - Charilaos Florakis, Greek politician, leader of the Communist Party of Greece from 1972 to 1989; in Paliozoglopi, Greece (d. 2005)
  - Richard J. Collins, American film and TV producer and director, known for TV programs Bonanza and Matlock; in New York City, United States (d. 2013)

== July 21, 1914 (Tuesday) ==
- Buckingham Palace Conference – Both Irish Nationalists and Irish Unionists met at the Royal Palace in London for a three-day peace conference. Those who attended were the Prime Minister H. H. Asquith, David Lloyd George, the Irish Parliamentary Party leader John Redmond, and his deputy John Dillon. The Unionists included Edward Carson, leader of the Irish Unionist Alliance, with Bonar Law, James Craig and Lord Henry Lansdowne. The Speaker of the House of Commons presided.
- Komagata Maru incident – The Canadian government mobilized HMCS Rainbow, a former Royal Navy ship, with troops from the British Columbia Regiment and The Seaforth Highlanders of Canada, to force the Japanese vessel to return to India.
- The Ban'etsu East railroad was extended in Fukushima Prefecture, Japan, with stations Mōgi and Miharu serving the line. As well, the Fukuen railroad was extended in Hiroshima Prefecture, Japan, with stations Yudamura serving the line.
- Astronomer Seth Barnes Nicholson first observed Sinope, one of the moons of the planet Jupiter at the Lick Observatory, although the satellite would not receive a name until 1975 when it was named after one of the daughters of the god Asopus.
- The sports club Palermo was established in Buenos Aires in close affiliation to the Argentine Football Association.
- Born: Philippe Ariès, French historian, author of Centuries of Childhood; in Blois, France (d. 1984)
- Died:
  - Kai Ho, 55, Hong Kongese lawyer and activist, mentor to Sun Yat-sen, the first president of the Republic of China (b. 1859)
  - Jurji Zaydan, 52, Lebanese writer and activist, promoter of Arab nationalism (b. 1861)

== July 22, 1914 (Wednesday) ==
- Enver Pasha, Minister of War for the Ottoman Empire, proposed an Ottoman–German alliance to Baron Hans Freiherr von Wangenheim, the German ambassador in Constantinople, but had it turned down on the grounds the Empire had nothing of value to offer Germany. Grand Vizir Said Halim Pasha also made similar propositions to Austria-Hungary.
- Railway workers in Saint John, New Brunswick went on strike, resulting in riots the following day.
- The Austro-Hungarian Navy battleships Erzherzog Franz Ferdinand, Radetzky, and SMS Zrínyi each transported one flying boat from Pola to the Gulf of Cattaro. The following day they carried out a reconnaissance of the border with Montenegro. These were the first operational flights in Europe by naval aircraft.
- The last issue of French anarchist journal L'Anarchie was published. It would be re-launched in 1926 by Louis Louvet.
- Born: Robert G. Emmens, American air force officer, member of the Doolittle Raid in 1942, recipient of the Distinguished Flying Cross; in Medford, Oregon, United States (d. 1992)

== July 23, 1914 (Thursday) ==
- July Crisis – Austria-Hungary presented Serbia with an unconditional ultimatum, which among its provisions included Serbia to formally and publicly condemn the "dangerous propaganda" against Austria-Hungary and to "suppress by every means this criminal and terrorist propaganda."
  - In an attempt to stem the tide of emerging war, British Foreign Secretary Sir Edward Grey offered to Russia and Germany to mediate a discussion with their respective allies that would influence Austria-Hungary to back off on Serbia while allowing each nation to save face. Russian foreign minister Sergey Sazonov agreed to the offer for conference, but Kaiser Wilhelm instructed his British ambassador to reject Grey's "condescending orders".
- Komagata Maru incident – After earlier resistance to police, passengers on the Komagata Maru complied and allowed the ship's crew to charter the Japanese vessel out of Canadian waters. Only 20 of the 376 Sikh and Hindu passengers were allowed into Canada as they already had residential papers.
- Striking railway workers in Saint John, New Brunswick clashed with police and militia brought in to control the crowds, leading to a shutdown of the city.
- The Moro Province in the Philippines, along with Agusan, Bukidnon and Surigao, was divided into the provinces of Zamboanga, Lanao, Cotabato, Davao, and Sulu. The political reorganization was completed under the authority of the Department of Mindanao and Sulu.
- Italian cruiser Basilicata was launched for service with the Royal Italian Navy at Castellammare, Italy.
- Local politician William V. Cleary of in Haverstraw, New York shot and killed his 18-year-old son-in-law, Eugene M. Newman, son of newspaper publisher Fred Newman, over the young man's secret marriage to Cleary's daughter. The subsequent murder trial ended with Cleary free in what was later suspected manipulation of the district attorney's office.
- The Dutch football association club RAP merged with Volharding sport club as a means to preserve membership in the Netherlands Football League. The new club Amsterdam was established in September.
- The 100th and final issue of the Shehbal cultural magazine for Constantinople was published.
- Born:
  - Alice Arden, American athlete, competed in the 1936 Summer Olympics, active in Olympic committees in New York City; in Philadelphia, United States (d. 2012)
  - Carlton Benjamin Goodlett, American publisher, founder of the Reporter Publishing Company which specialized in newspapers for African-American readers including The Sun-Reporter; in Chipley, Florida, United States (d. 1997)
  - Virgil Finlay, American artist, illustrator for speculative fiction magazines including Amazing Stories and Weird Tales; in Rochester, New York, United States (d. 1971)
  - Carl Foreman, American screenwriter, known for the screenplays including High Noon, recipient of the Academy Award for Best Adapted Screenplay for The Bridge on the River Kwai; in Chicago, United States (d. 1984)
  - Alf Prøysen, Norwegian writer, author of the children's book series Mrs. Pepperpot; as Alf Olafsen, in Ringsaker Municipality, Norway ([d. 1970)
- Died: Charlotte Forten Grimké, 76, American poet, prominent member of the American Anti-Slavery Society (b. 1837)

== July 24, 1914 (Friday) ==
- July Crisis – Expecting a declaration against them, Serbia mobilized for war while Austria-Hungary broke off diplomatic relations. The British Ambassador to Austria-Hungary reported to London: "War is thought imminent. Wildest enthusiasm prevails in Vienna."
- The Russian Council of Ministers met after Austria-Hungary presented their ultimatum to Serbia. Alexander Krivoshein, close adviser to Tsar Nicholas, noted the "rearmament programme had not been completed and it seemed doubtful whether our Army and Fleet would ever be able to compete with those of Germany and Austria-Hungary." It was decided Russia would partially mobilize against Austria-Hungary to deter war.
- Buckingham Palace Conference – The conference broke up after three days without agreement on resolving the issue of Irish Home Rule, but there was understanding from both sides that if Ulster were to be excluded, the Irish province should come in or out as a whole.
- Mexican Revolution – Exiled former Mexican president Victoriano Huerta reached Kingston, Jamaica aboard the German cruiser SMS Dresden where he resided with his family before journeying to the United States in the spring of 1915.
- Striking railway workers and the municipal government of Saint John, New Brunswick reached an agreement that ended the strike.
- Weekly newspaper The Mears Newz began publication in Mears, Michigan.
- Born:
  - Frances Oldham Kelsey, Canadian pharmacologist, advocated to the U.S. Food and Drug Administration to not authorize thalidomide for sale; as Frances Oldham, in Cobble Hill, British Columbia, Canada (d. 2015)
  - Ed Mirvish, American-Canadian businessman and philanthropist, owner of Honest Ed's landmark store in Toronto; as Yehuda Edwin Mirvish, in Colonial Beach, Virginia (d. 2007)
  - Kenneth Clark, American psychologist, co-founder with wife Mamie Clark of Harlem Youth Opportunities Unlimited and first African-American president of the American Psychological Association; in Panama Canal Zone (d. 2005)

== July 25, 1914 (Saturday) ==
- July Crisis – Emperor Franz Joseph signed a mobilization order for the Austro-Hungarian Army and its 1st, 2nd, 3rd, 4th, 5th, and 6th, 7th and 8th field armies to begin operations against Serbia within 72 hours. At the same time, Austro-Hungarian ambassador Baron Wladimir Giesl von Gieslingen left Belgrade. Radomir Putnik, Chief of the Serbian General Staff, was arrested in Budapest but subsequently allowed to return to Serbia.
- Born:
  - Vũ Văn Mẫu, Vietnamese politician, last Prime Minister of South Vietnam; in Hanoi, French Indochina (present-day Vietnam) (d. 1998)
  - Woody Strode, American football player and actor, offensive end for the Los Angeles Rams and Calgary Stampeders from 1946 to 1949, Grey Cup champion in 1948, known for roles in Sergeant Rutledge, Pork Chop Hill and Spartacus; as Woodrow Strode, in Los Angeles, United States (d. 1994)

== July 26, 1914 (Sunday) ==
- July Crisis – An offer from Great Britain to mediate a resolution to the political crisis between Austria-Hungary, Germany, Serbia, and Russia was rejected by Germany and Russia.
- Howth gun-running – Erskine Childers and his wife Molly sailed into Howth on his yacht Asgard and landed 2,500 guns for the Irish Volunteers. The King's Own Scottish Borderers of the British Army, having been called out to assist police in attempting to prevent the Volunteers from moving the arms to Dublin, fired on a crowd of protesters at Bachelors Walk, killing three and injuring 38 (a fourth man later died from bayonet wounds).
- The Assembly of Delvino was dissolved only weeks after it assembled in Delvino, Albania.
- Belgian cyclist Philippe Thys won the 12th Tour de France with a total race time of 200 hours, 28 minutes and 48 seconds.
- The Cathedral of the Incarnation in Nashville, Tennessee was officially opened to the public.
- The Church of Jesus Christ of Latter-day Saints dedicated the opening of the Randolph Tabernacle in Randolph, Utah. It was added to the National Register of Historic Places in 1986.
- Born:
  - Erskine Hawkins, American jazz trumpeter and bandleader, known for the hit "Tuxedo Junction" with partner Bill Johnson; in Birmingham, Alabama, United States (d. 1993)
  - Ralph Blane, American composer and singer, composed with partner Hugh Martin songs "The Boy Next Door", "Have Yourself a Merry Little Christmas" and "The Trolley Song" for the film musical Meet Me in St. Louis; as Ralph Uriah Hunsecker, in Broken Arrow, Oklahoma, United States (d. 1995)
  - C. Farris Bryant, American politician, 34th Governor of Florida; as Cecil Farris Bryant, in Marion County, Florida, United States (d. 2002)

== July 27, 1914 (Monday) ==
- July Crisis – Great Britain made a final push for peace, warning the German Empire and Austria-Hungary it would be forced to side with France and the Russian Empire should war break out.
- With the July Crisis reaching the breaking point, Kaiser Wilhelm returned from vacation to meet with his war council in Berlin.
- Born: Gusti Huber, Austrian actress, best known for the role of Anne Frank's mother Edith in the 1959 film The Diary of Anne Frank; as Auguste Huber, in Wieden, Austria-Hungary (present-day Austria) (d. 1993)

== July 28, 1914 (Tuesday) ==
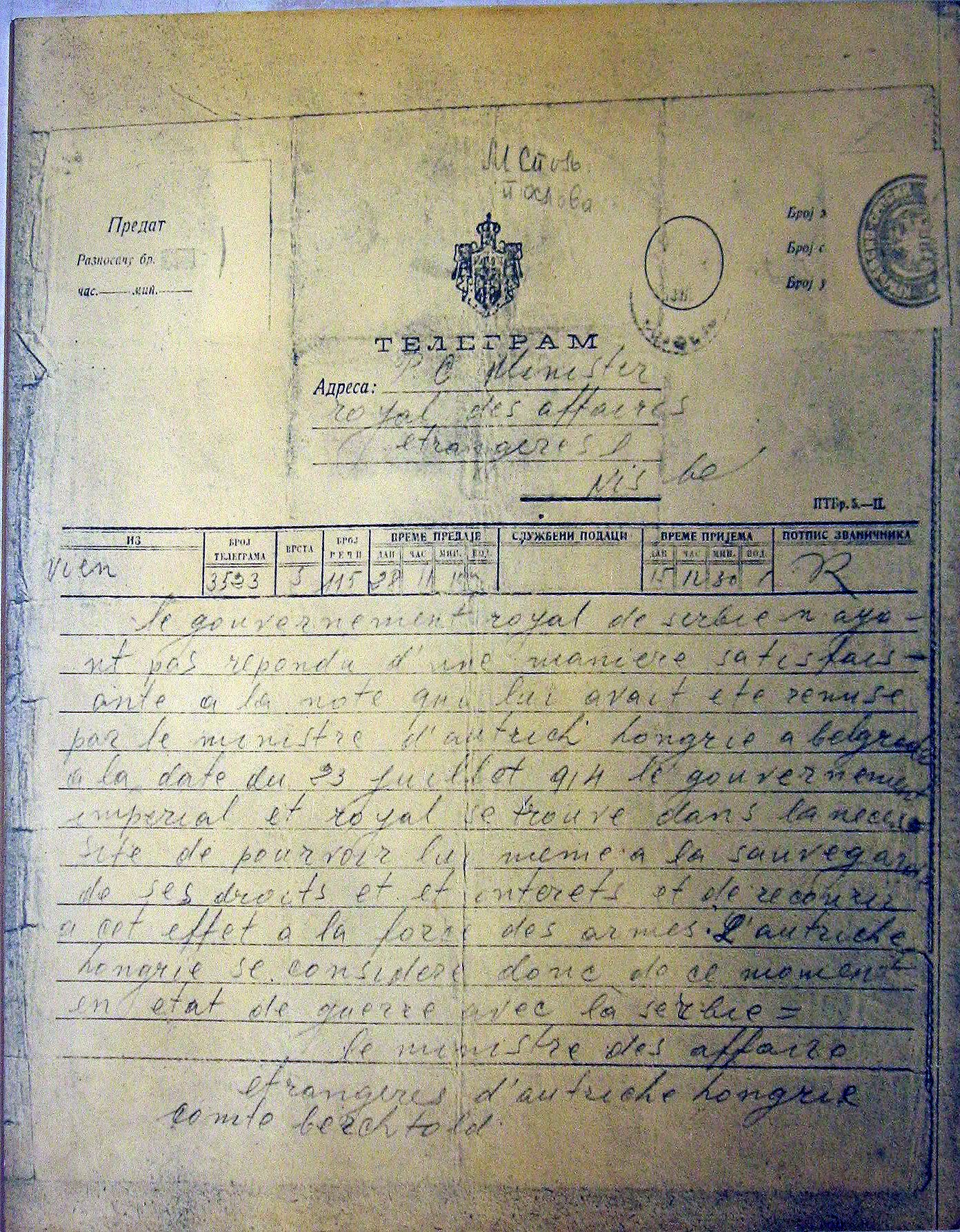
Austria-Hungary's telegram to the Kingdom of Serbia declaring war, 28 July 1914

- World War I – At 11:00 a.m., Austria-Hungary declared war on Serbia by telegram. The same day, a manifesto titled "To my peoples" and signed by Emperor Franz Joseph was released informing the citizens of the Austria-Hungary that the Empire was going to war.
- Pursuit of Goeben and Breslau – While the ships of the Imperial German Navy Mediterranean Division were under repair in the Adriatic Sea, Counter Admiral Wilhelm Souchon learned that British and French naval forces had been ordered to capture the ships. He ordered the repairs stopped and the ships to set course for the Dardanelles, a narrow strait in northwestern Turkey, as a means to escape the naval blockade.
- A French jury acquitted Henriette Caillaux, wife of French minister Joseph Caillaux, of the murder of newspaper editor Gaston Calmette after defense lawyer Fernand Labori (who famously defended Alfred Dreyfus) successfully argued the homicide was a crime of passion and not premeditated. Cailllaux shot the editor of Le Figaro in March after she believed Calmette would publish love letters between her and her husband indicating they were intimate while Joseph was still married to his first wife.
- Royal Naval Air Service Squadron Commander Arthur Longmore successfully released a 14-inch (356-mm) torpedo from a Short Admiralty Type 81 floatplane, possibly the first successful aerial launch of a torpedo, although Captain Alessandro Guidoni of Italy's drop of a dummy torpedo from the experimental Pateras Pescara monoplane may have occurred earlier that year.
- Following several unsuccessful test flights, the aircraft manufacturer Noel Pemberton Billing was forced to dismantle the Pemberton-Billing P.B.1 seaplane and use its engine for a scout airplane model.
- The village of Big Valley, Alberta was established.
- Born: Kenneth Neate, Australian opera singer, tenor for the Bayreuth Festspielhaus in Germany; in Cessnock, New South Wales, Australia (d. 1997)

== July 29, 1914 (Wednesday) ==
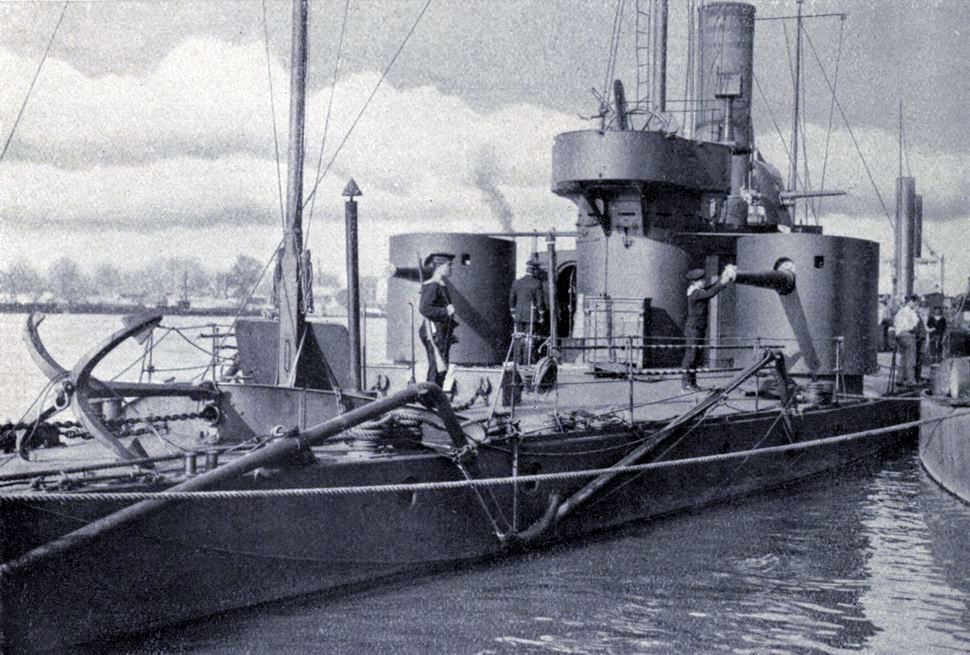
River military boat SMS Bodrog on the Danube river in 1914

- World War I – The first shots of the war were fired at 1:00 a.m. when Austria's river monitor SMS Bodrog bombarded Belgrade in response to Serbia blowing up the only major bridge across the river Sava which linked the two countries.
- The new Cape Cod Canal opened in Massachusetts, shortening the trip between New York City and Boston by 66 miles, but also turning Cape Cod into an island.
- The first transcontinental telephone line was completed between New York City and San Francisco.
- Born:
  - Irwin Corey, American actor and comic, considered influential in the comedic styles of Lenny Bruce and Tom Smothers; in New York City, United States (d. 2017)
  - Abram Games, English graphic designer, known for many logos and designs including the Conquest of the Desert 1953 world's fair exhibition in Jerusalem; in London, England (d. 1996)
  - Marcel Bich, Italian-French inventor, manufacturer and co-founder of the Bic ballpoint pen; in Turin, Kingdom of Italy (present-day Italy) (d. 1994)
- Died: Johann Sperl, 73, German painter, known for his pastoral landscapes of Germany (b. 1840)

== July 30, 1914 (Thursday) ==
- The American Consul at Canton reported massive flooding from the West River in the Kwangtung and Kwangsi provinces of China resulted in 3,300 deaths and $43 million in property damage. Around 112,000 homes were lost and close to 8 million people were in need of emergency supplies.
- Pursuit of Goeben and Breslau – Winston Churchill, the First Lord of the Admiralty, instructed Admiral Archibald Berkeley Milne, commander of the Mediterranean Fleet, "to aid the French in the transportation of their African Army by covering, and if possible, bringing to action individual fast German ships, particularly Goeben, who may interfere in that action."
- A fireworks explosion during a festival in Tudela, Spain killed 25 people and injured another 50.
- A fire destroyed Seattle's Grand Trunk Pacific dock, the largest wooden pier structure on America's west coast, leaving five dead and 29 injured.
- Norwegian aviator Tryggve Gran made the first crossing of the North Sea by aeroplane, flying a Blériot XI-2 monoplane Ca Flotte 465 km (289 mi) from Cruden Bay, Scotland, to Jæren, Norway, in 4 hours 10 minutes.
- The All-Russian Zemstvo Union was established in Moscow to support sick and wounded soldiers in the coming world war.
- The Canal Street railroad bridge spanning the Chicago River was completed in Chicago.
- Born:
  - Michael Morris, British journalist and sports executive, 6th president of the International Olympic Committee; in London, England (d. 1999)
  - Ken Bell, Canadian war photographer, photographed the Canadian armed forces in the Normandy landings and the liberation of France, the Netherlands and Belgium during World War II; as George Kenneth Bell, in Toronto, Canada (d. 2000)
  - Richard Peek, Australian naval officer, Chief of the Royal Australian Navy from 1970 to 1973, recipient of the Order of the British Empire, Order of the Bath, Distinguished Service Cross and Legion of Merit; in Tamworth, New South Wales, Australia (d. 2010)
- Died: Albert Trott, 41, Australian cricketer, batsman for the Australia and England cricket teams, as well as for the Marylebone Cricket Club from 1896 to 1911 (b. 1873)

== July 31, 1914 (Friday) ==
- World War I – Tsar Nicholas ordered full mobilization of the Imperial Russian Army against Austria-Hungary, including the 1st, 2nd, 3rd, 4th, 5th, 6th, 7th, 8th, 9th, 10th, and 11th Armies, as well as the Caucasus Army for the Caucasus Military District in the southern front of the Russian Empire.
- A price surge caused by the outbreak of the World War I pushed Great Britain to shut down the London Stock Exchange and prevent a run on the banks. The London Stock Exchange remained closed until the New Year.
- The 8th Congress of the Armenian Revolutionary Federation was held in Erzurum, Turkey to discuss pushing Russia towards granting autonomy to Russian Armenia.
- The Swiss Air Force was established.
- French Socialist leader Jean Jaurès was assassinated in a Parisian café by Raoul Villain, a 29-year-old French nationalist. Jaurès had been due to attend a conference of the International on August 9, in an attempt to dissuade France from going ahead with the war.
- The post office in Polaris, Arizona closed, officially making the mining community a ghost town.
- Born:
  - Louis de Funès, French actor, best known for his adaptation of the Molière classic The Miser; as Louis Germain David de Funès de Galarza, in Courbevoie, France (d. 1983)
  - Raymond Aubrac, French partisan fighter, one of the major leaders of the French Resistance during World War II, recipient of the Legion of Honour; as Raymond Samuel, in Vesoul, France (d. 2012)
  - Mario Bava, Italian film director, best known for developing the giallo horror sub-genre in the 1960s; in Sanremo, Kingdom of Italy (present-day Italy) (d. 1980)
