= Polaris, Arizona =

Ghost town in Yuma County, Arizona

Coordinates: 33.296979°N 113.969935°W

Polaris is an American ghost town in the northern part of Yuma County, Arizona, in the Kofa Mountains.

Polaris was a settlement at the North Star Mine, in the Kofa District at the foot of the Polaris Mountain, in Arizona Territory in 1909, the same year the gold and silver mine was discovered. Polaris was named for the North Star and had a population of 150 residents in 1910. The post office was established there June 17, 1909. The mine was worked from 1907 until it played out in 1911 and the post office was discontinued July 31, 1914 as the town died.
