= 1914 Saint John street railway strike =

Saint John street railway strike
- Date: 22 July 1914 - 24 July 1914
- Location: Saint John, New Brunswick, Canada
- Caused by: Firing of union members, punitive enforcement of policies
- Methods: Strike, riot
- Result: Success. Union members re-hired.

Parties
Amalgamated Association of Street and Electric Railway Employees Local 663, inhabitants of Saint John	St. John Railway Company, Saint John police, Pinkerton and Thiel strikebreakers, 62nd Fusiliers, 28th Dragoons

Lead figures
Fred Ramsey, Sidney Mosher	H.M. Hopper

Number
136 strikers; 10,000 inhabitants of Saint John	35-50 strikebreakers; nearly 500 militiamen

Casualties
- Injuries: 2+ dragoons, many rioters
- Arrested: 14+ rioters

The Saint John street railway strike of 1914 (sometimes called the Saint John street railwaymen's strike) was a strike by workers on the street railway system in Saint John, New Brunswick, Canada, which lasted from 22–24 July 1914, with rioting by Saint John inhabitants occurring on 23 and 24 July. The strike shattered the image of Saint John as a conservative town dominated primarily by ethnic and religious (rather than class) divisions, and highlighting tensions between railway industrialists and the local working population.

== Background ==
=== Political climate ===
The strike and subsequent riot followed in a tradition of mass militant activity which preceded it by decades. Ethno-religious conflict, embodied by struggles between Orangemen and Irish Catholics, began in the 1840s and involved repeated episodes of violence and intimidation, with Orangemen conducting armed marches through Irish neighbourhoods for decades. This conflict strengthened ethnic and religious allegiances, especially between Protestant workers and their Protestant employers.

Warning shocks of the conflict to come were indicated by repeated episodes of crowd violence starting in the early 1900s, often revolving around holidays such as New Year's Eve, which would set a tone of decisive mass action on the part of ordinary people living in Saint John.

=== Street railway ===
Starting in 1866, public transit consisted of horse-drawn cars which mostly funneled traffic from the ocean to ferries on the Saint John River. The electric trolley system in Saint John made its debut in 1893 and the fledgling St. John Railway Company was quickly bought by a Montréal-based consortium which included the railway magnates W.C. Van Horne, Richard B. Angus, and Thomas G. Shaughnessy, only a year after the Canadian Pacific "Short Line" had connected Montréal to Saint John; they invested the then-substantial sum of $92,000 into the project, seen also as an investment in Saint John as a major Maritime winter port.

Positive public opinion on the trolley system quickly soured, with citizens complaining of infrequent service and overcrowded cars. The company delayed expansion of the system to Saint John's West Side, with contemporary critics claiming it as an issue of class, arguing that "the railway clings to the streets where the nickels are the thickest." Bearing this out, the city refused to sponsor workingmen's tickets (then common in other street railways in Canada), cementing the trolley as a service inaccessible to many. By 1902, the company was belatedly forestalling attempts at a municipally-run trolley service by laying track along Douglas Avenue, followed by street service throughout the West Side. This issue acted as a microcosm of political relations in the province; the Tory opposition, led by John Douglas Hazen (a Saint John native), endorsed a municipal trolley service, while the ruling Liberal government instead placed the railway in charge of snow removal and street repair along its route, making a great deal of public infrastructure maintenance contingent on the railway company's goodwill.

Following the Tory victory in the 1908 provincial election, a Board of Public Utility Commissioners was formed and given the ability to fine utility companies for violating utility regulations, raising the stakes of the struggle. A warning sign appeared on New Year's Eve in 1910, when 500-600 people vandalized a streetcar.

In 1913, with new suburban lines seemingly not forthcoming, the city introduced bills to charter a rival railway company. Further attempts by the city to purchase the railway failed, and the company executives issued even more stock to finance moderate expansions amid complaints of overcrowding in the downtown and the inaccessibility of suburbs. By then, it had come under the control of Colonel Hugh H. McLean (a prominent Orangeman and maritime lawyer, known for representing Canadian Pacific and Bank of Montreal interests), F.R. Taylor (a member of his law firm), Senator W.H. Thorne (a prominent merchant), and James Manchester (part-owner of the leading wholesaler in the Maritimes). H.M. Hopper was the general manager of the company.

=== Railway union ===
In the midst of this crisis appeared Local 663 of the Amalgamated Association of Street and Electric Railway Employees, formed on May Day 1914. Saint John was no stranger to unions, but a lack of heavy industrialization had left the city mostly a bastion of old-style craft unions, with the more socialist-influenced industrial unions such as the Industrial Workers of the World more likely to exist in major centres such as Toronto or Montréal, or in the resource industries in Northern Ontario, Québec, and the West. Unions would become more common by the early 1910s, however, with longshoremen and other waterfront workers, building trades, printers, cigar-makers, and tailors all forming unions, along with a Saint John Trades and Labour Council being founded, which by 1913 would represent 4,000 workers, or about 40% of the labour force of Saint John. This renewed class consciousness and class-based form of organization helped to weaken the ethnic and religious ties which bound working-class Catholics and Protestants to the company owners and divided them against each other, something which would set the stage for the antagonism to follow.

The company reception to the formation of the eighty-member Local 663 was abrupt and decisive, with ten-year employee and local union president Fred Ramsey being summarily fired for abandoning his trolley car to go into a saloon, a charge he denied; and the company refusing to negotiate with the union's business agent. The union made a filing under the Industrial Disputes Investigation Act to challenge Ramsay's firing and threatening a strike if the company did not negotiate. In the subsequent hearing, Ramsey's coworkers and the saloon keeper all denied that he had entered the saloon, and a company inspector failed to find evidence of any wrongdoing on Ramsey's part. Only a detective hired by the company was left claiming Ramsey's guilt. In the investigation, three trolley workers claimed harassment by company management over the union, bolstering the union's position. The investigation concluded by ruling that Ramsey would be re-hired by the company and instructing the company to negotiate with the union leadership. Instead, the company refused to re-hire Ramsey or negotiate with the union. It also instated new, very strict employee regulations, then fired more and more workers for claimed violation of them: eight men on July 18, then three on July 20, all prominent union members who were replaced with non-union workers. At 3am on July 22, the union declared a strike.

== Strike ==
The union began with pickets at the car barns where the trolleys were stored overnight, which prevented two-thirds of the trolley cars from leaving the barns. Meanwhile, the company had hired fifty professional strikebreakers from a Montréal agency and the mayor of Saint John swore in six "special" police officers. As the day went on, many of the non-union trolley operators simply abandoned their cars in the street and joined the strikers. The union also made the tactical decision to hire a horse-drawn bus to provide service to Saint John inhabitants who were inconvenienced from the strike, winning public support and denying the company fares in the same act.

By the afternoon of July 22, crowds of bystanders had gathered to alternately cheer on the strikers and jeer at scabs. By the evening, a crowd of 2000 people had gathered to cheer on the strikers, which swelled to 7-8000 in the space of a few hours.

On July 23, fifteen strikebreakers arrived from Montréal, but union business agent Sidney Mosher warned that the union had no ability to control the crowd if it turned violent. Numerous incidents occurred of citizens blocking tracks or otherwise delaying trolleys throughout the day. The situation peaked when a mob of up to 10,000 people tossed small stones at passing trolleys in King Square, with the crowd defending itself from police attacks, disarming one policeman when he fired on them with his revolver. The street railway workers maintained strict discipline and were not involved in the fight.

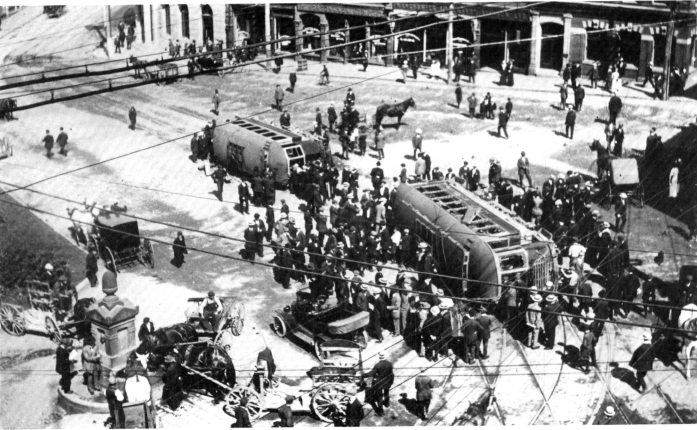
The aftermath of the riot, photographed the next morning. Mayor Frink had read the Riot Act from the stone fountain in the bottom left.

By 9pm, Mayor James Frink had made the decision to read the Riot Act to the crowd, which ignored him. The local police immediately requested backup in the form of a detachment of the Royal Canadian Dragoons, who charged the crowd on horseback, beating the crowd with their ceremonial swords. Again, the crowd repulsed this attack, with injuries among the crowd and dragoons both, with the Globe later referring to the attack as "vicious". Incensed, the crowd overturned nearby trolley cars, then proceeded to the headquarters of the St. John Railway Company, smashing windows and shutting down the city's electrical generators. The emboldened crowd advanced to the car sheds to set fire to them, but were driven off by armed Pinkerton and Thiel strikebreakers, who fired on the crowd. Meanwhile, the mayor called up five hundred militiamen who stood guard overnight, though by then the crowd had dispersed. By evening, however, crowds had reappeared and hampered trolley services from operating again, with stones and other projectiles thrown and the non-union trolley crews abandoning their cars to be towed back to their car barns under militia protection.

The deadlock was broken by Fred Ramsey's resignation as union president in exchange for accepting a job with the city public works department, a deal negotiated between him and John B.M. Baxter, the city recorder, who acted as an informal negotiator. In exchange, the company agreed to re-hire the fired workers and to guarantee them a right of appeal against dismissals in the future, with an agreement ratified by 11:30 that night.

== Aftermath ==
Saint John, seen as a conservative town with a highly established social order, was wracked with controversy as a result of the rioting. Newspapers were indignant about the loss of public order. Politicians, conscious of the unpopularity of the railway company, refused to pay for the damages incurred (a total of $15,560) by rioters. Additionally, almost all of the rioters escaped with minor injuries, and those who were arrested mostly had their charges dismissed. All were soon distracted by the First World War, which quickly buried memories of the strike and riot. The railway company was bought by a local syndicate in 1917, its profitability having been damaged by wartime inflation of labour and materials costs.

== See also ==
- List of incidents of civil unrest in Canada
