= Yuraku =

First philatelic journal in Japan

Yuraku was the first philatelic magazine published in Japan. The first edition was issued in Tokyo on 16 July 1914 under the editorship of Meguro Kimura. It was the organ of The Yurakukai (Philatelic Society of Japan). It continued until at least Volume 9, 1922.
