= Joé Anduran =

France international rugby union player

- Born: Marie Jean-Baptiste Joseph Anduran; 24 April 1882 Bayonne, France
- Died: 2 October 1914 (aged 32) Bois-Bernard, France
- Height: 174 cm (5 ft 9 in)
- Weight: 75 kg (11 st 11 lb)

Rugby union career
- Position: Hooker
Amateur team(s)
Years	Team	Apps	(Points)
- Sporting Club Universitaire de France
International career
Years	Team	Apps	(Points)
1910	France	1	(0)

Marie Jean-Baptiste Joseph Anduran, better known as Joé Anduran or Joe Anduran, was a French rugby union player. He was born on 24 April 1882 in Bayonne, and died at Bois-Bernard in the Pas-de-Calais on 2 October 1914, during the First World War.

He was 1.74 m tall and weighed 75 kg. He usually played hooker, with SCUF (Sporting club universitaire de France); after 1908 he served as section secretary, he won the Paris Championship as captain of their second team in 1912, and in 1913 he was in the first team that lost in the final of the national championship.

A soldier with the French infantry, he was killed in 1914, the first year of World War I, leaving behind two children, Jacqueline, who was six years old and Jean, who was five months old.

France was admitted into the Five Nations Championship for the first time in 1910.

The French side had only 14 players when the players got together the day before the match at the Gare Saint-Lazare. The team manager, Charles Brennus, engaged the Parisian player Anduran on short notice to fill out the team, enabling them to play their first match in the tournament with a complete squad. He was relatively easy to find, because he was an art dealer and was opening a show that day.

== Career ==
=== Club ===
- SCUF

=== International ===
- Joe Anduran played in just one international match, as hooker against Wales in the 1910 Five Nations Championship.

== Highlights ==
- French Rugby League Championship finalists in 1911 and 1913.

== Notes ==
- Godwin, Terry Complete Who's Who of International Rugby (Cassell, 1987, ISBN 0-7137-1838-2)
