= Guy Charmot =

French military doctor (1914–2019)

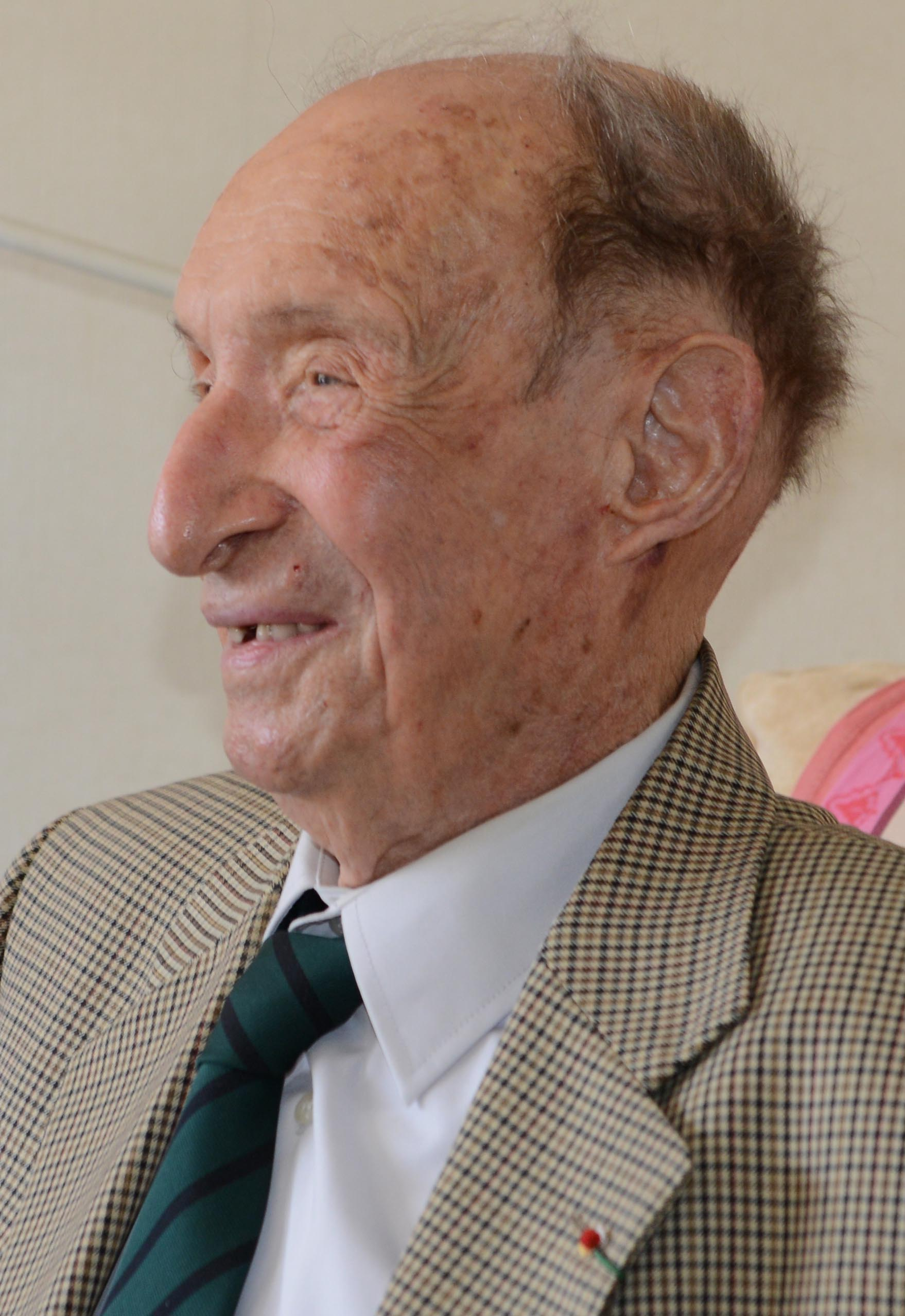
- Guy Charmot in 2014
- Born: 9 October 1914; Toulon, France
- Died: 7 January 2019 (aged 104); Marseille, France
- Occupation: Military doctor

Guy Charmot (9 October 1914 – 7 January 2019) was a French military doctor and member of the French resistance during World War II.

== Biography ==
=== Childhood and education ===
Charmot was the son of Ulysse Charmot, a tax collector, and Claire Esmieu. From a young age, Charmot wanted to be a doctor. In 1934, he began studying at École de santé des armées in Bron. He was particularly attracted to the field of military medicine, and officially became a doctor in 1937. He was posted to a medical center near hunting and game lands in Saint-Avold. In 1939, he completed his studies and entered the French Defence Health Service in Pharo.

=== World War II ===
In September 1939, Charmot awaited an assignment to French West Africa. He was a physician for the 49th Colonial Field Artillery Regiment, but he wanted to stay in France. However, he was sent to Africa against his will after working along the Maginot Line. He left Bordeaux in March 1940 for Dakar. In June 1941, Charmot left French West Africa for Syria. He stayed in Damascus for about a month, and then left for Berbera, Somalia. In 1943, Charmot was sent to Tunisia and aided Allied troops as they took North Africa back from the Germans. After that, he helped aid troops in liberating France and Italy.

=== Career ===
At the end of the war, Charmot became a doctor-captain for his work in World War II. As a member of the French Defence Health Service, he was a doctor in many French colonies, such as Senegal, Congo, and Madagascar until 1965. Once the French officially decolonized, Charmot moved back to France. He was a specialist in tropical medicine, and participated in therapeutic research for Rhône-Poulenc. He was also a consultant for Bichat–Claude Bernard Hospital.

Later, Charmot became a professor at the Pasteur Institute, where he wrote or co-wrote over 300 articles and contributed to medical textbooks. He was the President of Société de Pathologie Exotique from 1982 to 1986, and elected a member of Académie des sciences d'outre-mer in 1994.

Charmot died on 7 January 2019. Today, there is a library named after him in Marseille.
