= Agnès-Marie Valois =

French nun and nurse

- Born: 30 June 1914; Rouen, France
- Died: April 19, 2018 (aged 103)
- Occupation: Nurse

Agnès Cécile Marie-Madeleine Valois (French pronunciation: [aɲɛs sesil maʁi madlɛn valwa]; 30 June 1914 – 19 April 2018), also known as Sister Agnès-Marie, was a French Roman Catholic religious sister and nurse. She became known as "Angel of Dieppe" for her heroic efforts in caring for soldiers at the disastrous World War II Dieppe Raid. For this she was decorated by France and Canada. An Augustinian sister, she had been trained as a surgical nurse before the war. She died on 19 April 2018 at the age of 103, at a monastery near Dieppe, France.

== Early life ==
Valois was born in Rouen in 1914. Her grandfather Jules Vallois had a rope factory in Notre-Dame-de-Bondeville which her father Gaston inherited. Today it is a museum.

== Career ==
Valois entered the Hôtel-Dieu de Rouen convent of the Canonesses of St. Augustine of the Mercy of Jesus in 1936 where she started living as Sister Marguerite-Marie in 1937. She took a temporary vow to become a religious sister in 1938 and the permanent, solemn vow in 1941. Educated as a nurse, she worked in the military ward from 1936 to 1938 and then in the surgery ward where she eventually specialized in anesthesia.

In 1942, Rouen had become part of the German occupied territory in France and the Hôtel-Dieu was under German control. On 19 August 1942, about 6,100 allied soldiers, most of them Canadians, but also some British and Americans, attacked the port of Dieppe. The attack immediately failed and about 3,300 either died or were captured, many of them severely wounded. Valois was among 10 Augustinian nurses who cared for the wounded soldiers, first on the beach and later at the Hôtel-Dieu hospital. Her actions and behaviour made her part of Canadian military lore where several stories and legends about her showing courage and compassion circulated after the war. She was nicknamed "Angel of Dieppe" and "L'ange blanc" (The White Angel).

A veteran of the raid, Hardy Wheeler of the Essex and Kent Scottish regiment, described Valois as being "known for standing up to the German soldiers; they held a gun up to her to treat the German injured first, but she just looked at everyone as equal – regardless of rank, regardless of nation, regardless of who or what you are she treats those who needed help the most."

Valois commonly described what she witnessed with the words, "It wasn't war, it was a massacre."

After the war, Valois would go on to become a healthcare administrator. When the Hôtel-Dieu in Rouen closed in 1968, Valois went to live in the convent Sainte-Marie de Thibermont in Martin-Église where she took the name Sister Agnès-Marie. She died at the convent on 19 April 2018, at the age of 103.

== Awards and honours ==
Valois became a Dame of the French National Order of Merit in 1992, and also a Dame, and later an Officer, of the Legion of Honour in 1996. In 2009, she was awarded the Meritorious Service Medal, civil division, from Canada. In 2012, she received the key of the City of Windsor during an event commemorating the 70th anniversary of the Dieppe raid.

Valois's 100th birthday was celebrated by the city of Dieppe. Guests included the mayor of Dieppe, mayors from the nearby English town of Newhaven, and representatives from Canada.
