= Louis Gabrillargues =

French footballer (1914-1994)

Personal information
- Date of birth: 16 June 1914
- Place of birth: Montpellier, France
- Date of death: 30 November 1994 (aged 80)
- Position: Midfielder

Senior career*
Years	Team	Apps	(Gls)
1933–1937	FC Sète		
1937–1938	Excelsior AC Roubaix		
1938–1939	Sochaux		
1939–1940	SR Colmar		
1940–1945	Nîmes		

International career
1934–1937	France	9	(0)

Managerial career
- 1942–1946: Nîmes
- ES La Rochelle
- 1956–1963: AAJ Blois
- 1968–1969: FC Montceau Bourgogne
- * Club domestic league appearances and goals

Louis Gabrillargues (16 June 1914 – 30 November 1994) was a French footballer. He was born in Montpellier.
