= Gaston Calmette =

French journalist and newspaper editor

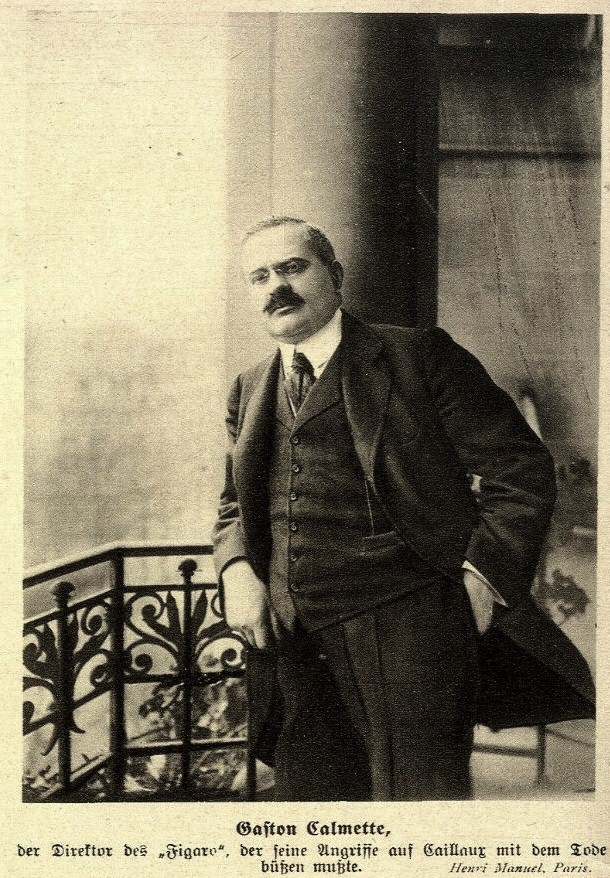
- Gaston Calmette in 1913
- Born: 30 June 1858; Montpellier, France
- Died: 16 March 1914 (aged 55); Paris, France
- Cause of death: Shot by Henriette Caillaux
- Resting place: Cimetière des Batignolles, (Batignolles Cemetery), Paris
- Occupations: Journalist and editor
- Employer: Le Figaro
- Relatives: Albert Calmette (brother)

Gaston Calmette (30 July 1858 – 16 March 1914) was a French journalist and newspaper editor, whose murder was the subject of a notable murder trial.

== Biography ==
Calmette was born in Montpellier. He was educated at Nice, Bordeaux, Clermont-Ferrand and Mâcon, and afterwards entered journalism. In 1884 he joined the staff of Le Figaro, and in 1894 became its editor. In January 1914, Calmette launched a campaign against Minister of Finance Joseph Caillaux, who had introduced progressive taxation and was known for his pacifist stance towards Germany during the Second Moroccan Crisis, in 1911. Almost every day Le Figaro produced evidence of a damaging sort against the minister with the object of proving that he used his official position to facilitate speculation on the Paris Bourse. The attitude of Caillaux in the Rochette case of 1911, in which it was alleged by Le Figaro that the director of public prosecutions had been influenced by the ministry to delay the course of justice, was brought forward, and a newspaper campaign of extraordinary violence was the result. Caillaux was urged by some of his colleagues to take legal proceedings against his accusers, but declined. Joseph Caillaux had to resign his post the 11 January 1912.

=== Assassination ===
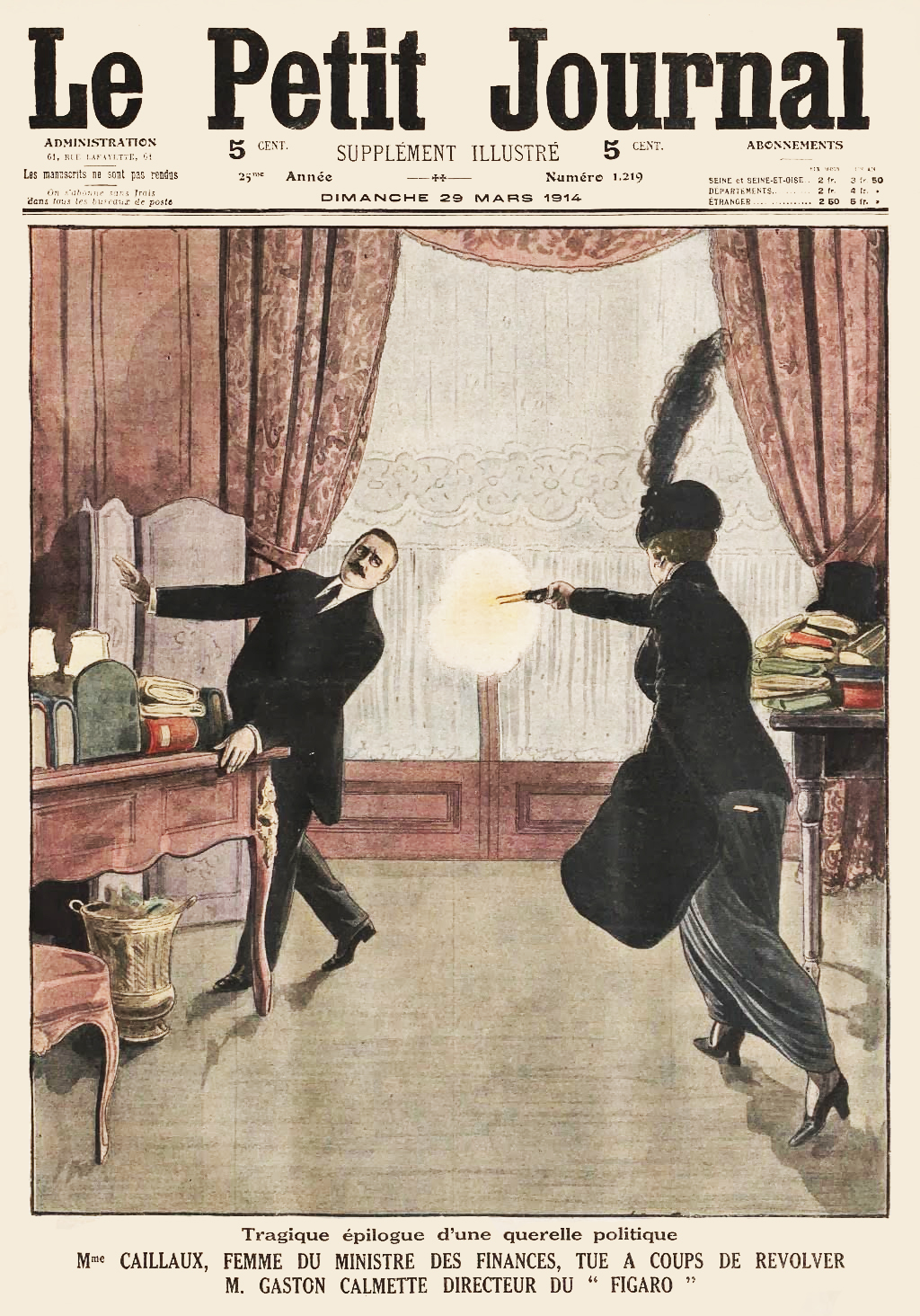
The cover of Le Petit Journal illustrating the assassination of Gaston Calmette by Henriette Caillaux

At 6:00 p.m. on 16 March 1914, Calmette entered the offices of Le Figaro in the company of his friend, the novelist Paul Bourget. Caillaux's second wife Henriette was waiting for him, wearing a fur coat and with her hands in a fur muff. To Bourget's surprise, Calmette agreed to see her in his office.

There, Madame Caillaux exchanged a few words with him, then pulled out a .32 Browning automatic pistol she had been concealing within the muff and fired six shots. Calmette was hit four times and was critically wounded, dying six hours later. Caillaux made no attempt to escape and newspaper workers in adjoining offices quickly summoned a doctor and the police. She refused to be transported to the police headquarters in a police van, insisting on being driven there by her chauffeur in her own car, which was still parked outside. The police agreed to this and she was formally charged upon reaching the headquarters. In court, she was acquitted from all allegations.

During the 1914 campaign against Joseph Caillaux, which was orchestrated by Louis Barthou and Raymond Poincaré, Le Figaro published several letters from the Minister's private correspondence. Madame Caillaux's motive was fear that the newspaper would also make public a love letter that showed how her husband was already having a relationship with her during his first marriage.

== Other interests ==
Calmette was well known for his interest in art, and possessed a fine collection of caricatures and engravings of the First Empire.

== Popular culture ==
Robert Delaunay used an illustration of the assassination as the basis for his 1914 painting Political Drama.

Marcel Proust dedicated Swann's Way, the first volume of his novel In Search of Lost Time, to Calmette 'as a testimony of deep and affectionate recognition'.

Calmette was the brother of the bacteriologist Albert Calmette.

== Bibliography ==
- Berenson, Edward The Trial of Madame Caillaux (Berkeley, Los Angeles, London: University of California Press, c1992, 1993). ISBN 0-520-08428-4
- Kershaw, Alister Murder in France (London: Constable & Company, Ltd., 1955), 90-117.
- Martin, Benjamin F. (1984). The Hypocrisy of Justice in the Belle Epoque. Louisiana State University Press.
