= Henriette Caillaux =

Parisian socialite (born 1874)

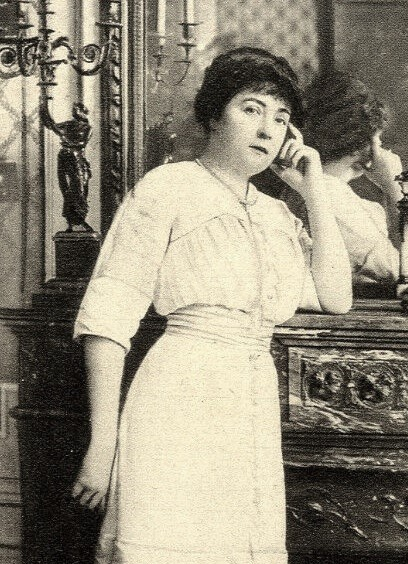
- Caillaux c. 1914
- Born: Henriette Raynouard; 5 December 1874; Rueil-Malmaison, France
- Died: 29 January 1943 (aged 68); Mamers, France
- Occupations: Socialite; art historian
- Known for: Killing Gaston Calmette
- Spouses: Leo Claretie (m. 1893; div. 1908); Joseph Caillaux (m. 1911)

Henriette Caillaux (French: [ɑ̃ʁjɛt kajo]; 5 December 1874 – 29 January 1943) was a Parisian socialite and second wife of the former Prime Minister of France, Joseph Caillaux. On 16 March 1914, she shot and killed Gaston Calmette, editor of the newspaper Le Figaro.

== Early life and marriages ==
Henriette Caillaux was born Henriette Raynouard, at Rueil-Malmaison on 5 December 1874. At the age of 19, she married Léo Claretie, a writer twelve years her senior. They had two children. In 1907 she began an affair with Joseph Caillaux while both he and she were still married. In 1908, she divorced Claretie; Caillaux had more difficulties in divorcing his wife, but he eventually did so and they married in October 1911.

She claimed she found in her second marriage "the most complete happiness"; their joint assets were worth around 1.5 million francs, placing them among France's wealthiest couples and allowing them to live in what she described as "great comfort". The circumstances of the marriage, along with substantial public scrutiny by political enemies, however, opened up lines of attack against the couple in terms of moral corruption.

== Shooting of Gaston Calmette ==
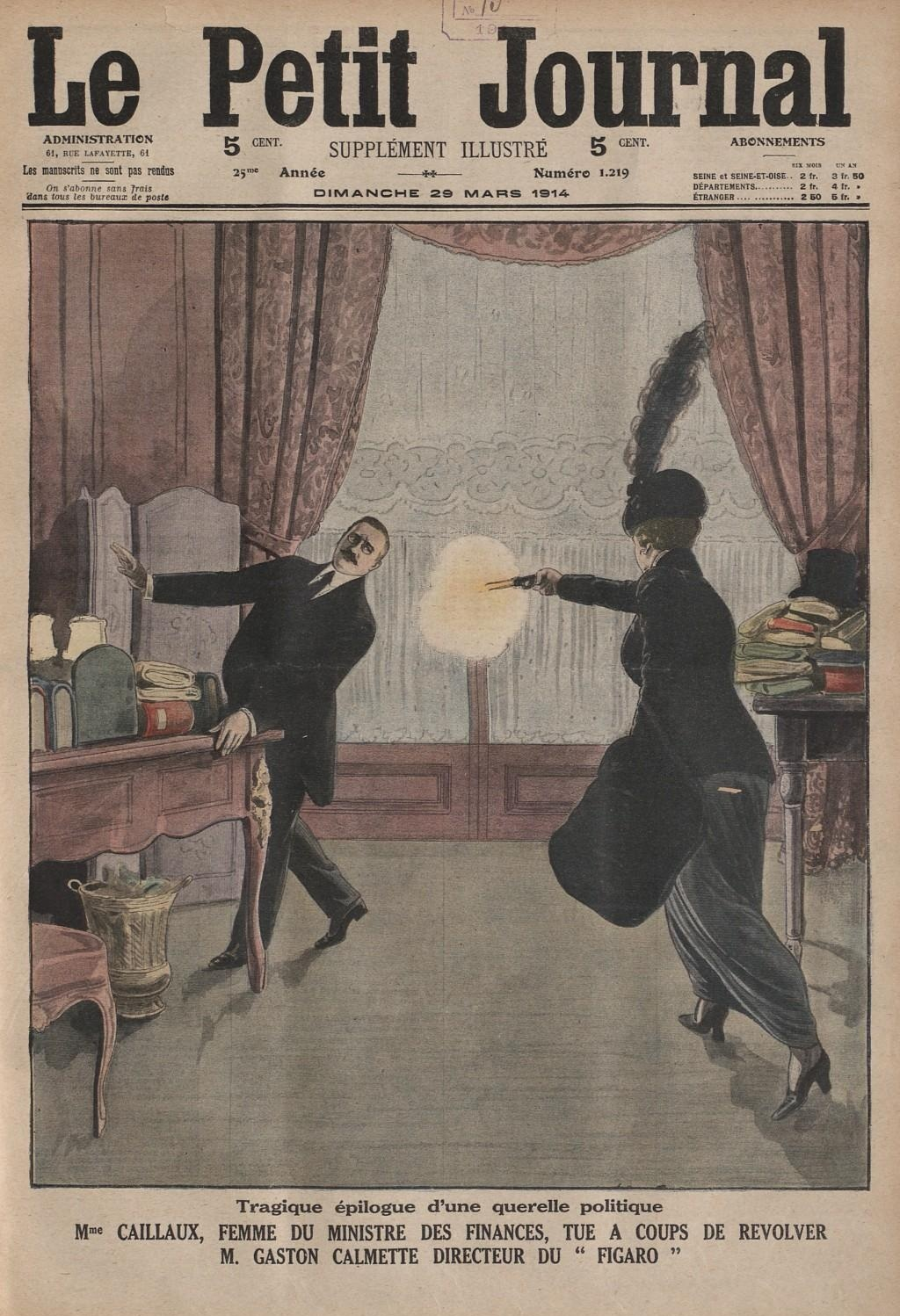
Cover illustration from Le Petit Journal (29 March 1914) depicting the assassination of Calmette by Madame Caillaux.

=== The shooting ===
In the evening of 16 March 1914, Madame Caillaux entered the offices of Le Figaro wearing a large fur coat with her hands in a fur muff and asked to see Gaston Calmette. When told he was away but would return within an hour, she sat to wait. She was ushered into Calmette's office around 6 pm. Asking whether the editor knew why she had come, Calmette answered in the negative; immediately afterward, Henriette Caillaux fired six shots from a Browning automatic pistol into Calmette's abdomen, mortally wounding him.

Henriette Caillaux made no attempt to escape and newspaper workers in adjoining offices quickly apprehended her and summoned a doctor and the police. Demanding not to be touched, she attempted to defend herself, saying that "there is no longer any justice in France" but was told curtly to be quiet. She refused to be transported to the police headquarters in a police van, insisting on being driven there by her chauffeur in her own car, which was still parked outside. The police agreed to this and she was formally charged upon reaching the headquarters. Gaston Calmette died six hours after being shot.

=== Trial ===
After substantial publicity and a lengthy investigation, her trial opened at the Paris Cour d'assises on 20 July 1914, where it promptly dominated French news. The trial, which included a sexual scandal and a crime passionel by a society French lady, received twice as many column inches in Le Temps as the ongoing July Crisis which culminated in the First World War, even as late as three days before the start of hostilities.

Because of the lax legal and procedural restraints in the cour d'assises, some felt the conduct of the trial "seemed almost structured for drama [and] given a certain kind of case, it could produce a spectacle more compelling than anything the theatres could provide". At the time, opinion of the assassination divided on political grounds: the left believed Calmette's character assassination had driven Madam Caillaux into temporary insanity; the right believed her to be a cold-blooded killer who had acted to silence a critic at her husband's request.

The president of the Republic, Raymond Poincaré, made a deposition at the trial, an unheard-of occurrence at a criminal proceeding almost anywhere, and many of the participants were among the most powerful members of French society. Heightening the drama, Henriette's husband threatened to release affidavits that he said he had, showing that Poincaré was behind the press campaign against him. If convicted, Madame Caillaux could have been sentenced to life imprisonment at hard labour, or death. If convicted but able to convince the jury of extenuating circumstances, she could be sentenced to five years of hard labour; or if, as happened, she could convince the jury of extremely extenuating circumstances, they could return a verdict of not guilty.

To that end, she "portrayed herself as the victim of passions beyond her control, as a woman rendered irresponsible by emotions more powerful than will itself" and attributed her actions to "uncontrollable impulses [which made] her lose control over her own actions". The defence, coupled with the emergence of sociological theories of criminology which attributed criminal action to environmental and unconscious factors and the traditional narrative of women ruled by their passions, helped her secure acquittal on 28 July 1914.

== Later life ==
In the early 1930s, Caillaux was awarded a diploma of the École du Louvre for her thesis on the sculptor Jules Dalou. She published a reference book in 1935 in which she established an inventory of the work of this artist.

== Legacy ==
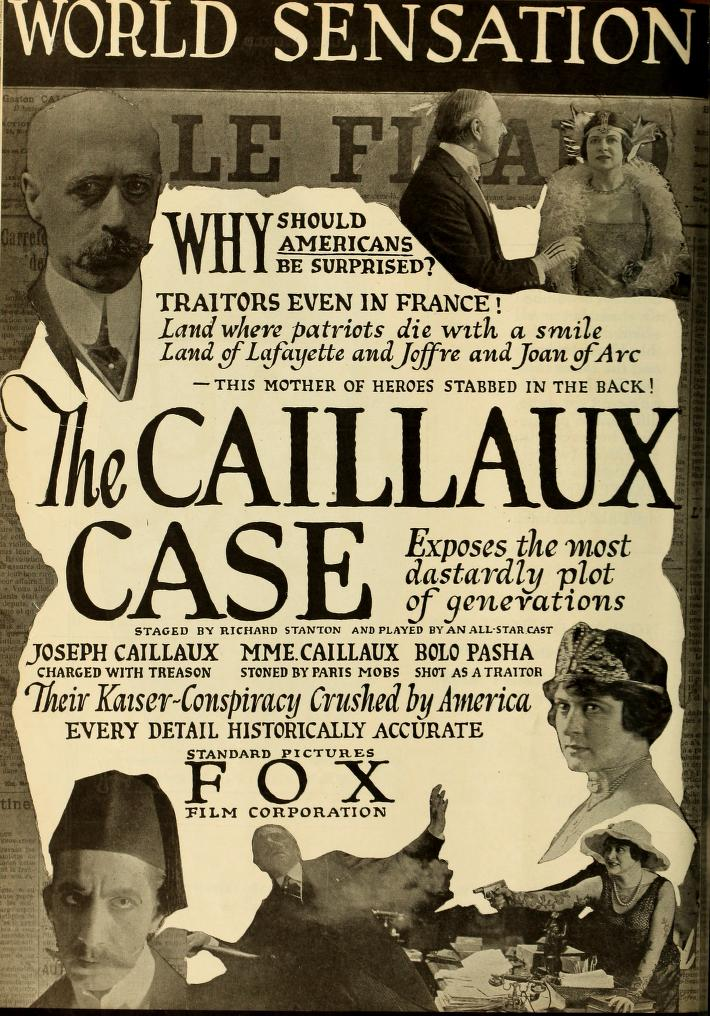
1918 ad for The Caillaux Case in Motion Picture World

In 1918, an American silent film, The Caillaux Case, was released by Fox Film. Directed by Richard Stanton, it featured Madlaine Traverse as Henriette Caillaux and Eugene Ormonde as Gaston Calmette. The film portrays both Henriette Caillaux and her husband as pro-German conspirators and traitors to France. Before and during World War I, Joseph Caillaux had been an advocate of peaceful compromise with Germany, and at the end of 1917 while the war was still going on, he was charged and convicted of treason. The film was not a financial success.

A 1985 made for French television film called L'Affaire Caillaux and a 1992 book titled The Trial of Madame Caillaux by American history professor Edward Berenson recount the event. In addition, Robert Delaunay used an illustration of the assassination as the basis for his 1914 painting Political Drama.

== Sources ==
- Berenson, Edward (1992). The trial of Madame Caillaux. Berkeley: University of California Press. ISBN 0-520-07347-9. OCLC 23286828.
- Clark, Christopher M (2013) [First published by Allen Lane 2012]. The sleepwalkers: how Europe went to war in 1914. New York: HarperCollins. ISBN 978-0-06-114665-7. OCLC 795757585.
- Martin, Benjamin F (1984). The Hypocrisy of Justice in the Belle Epoque. Louisiana State University Press. ISBN 9780807111161.
