= Takumi Arena =

Arena in Odate, Japan

Coordinates: 40°17′36.50″N 140°35′32.34″E

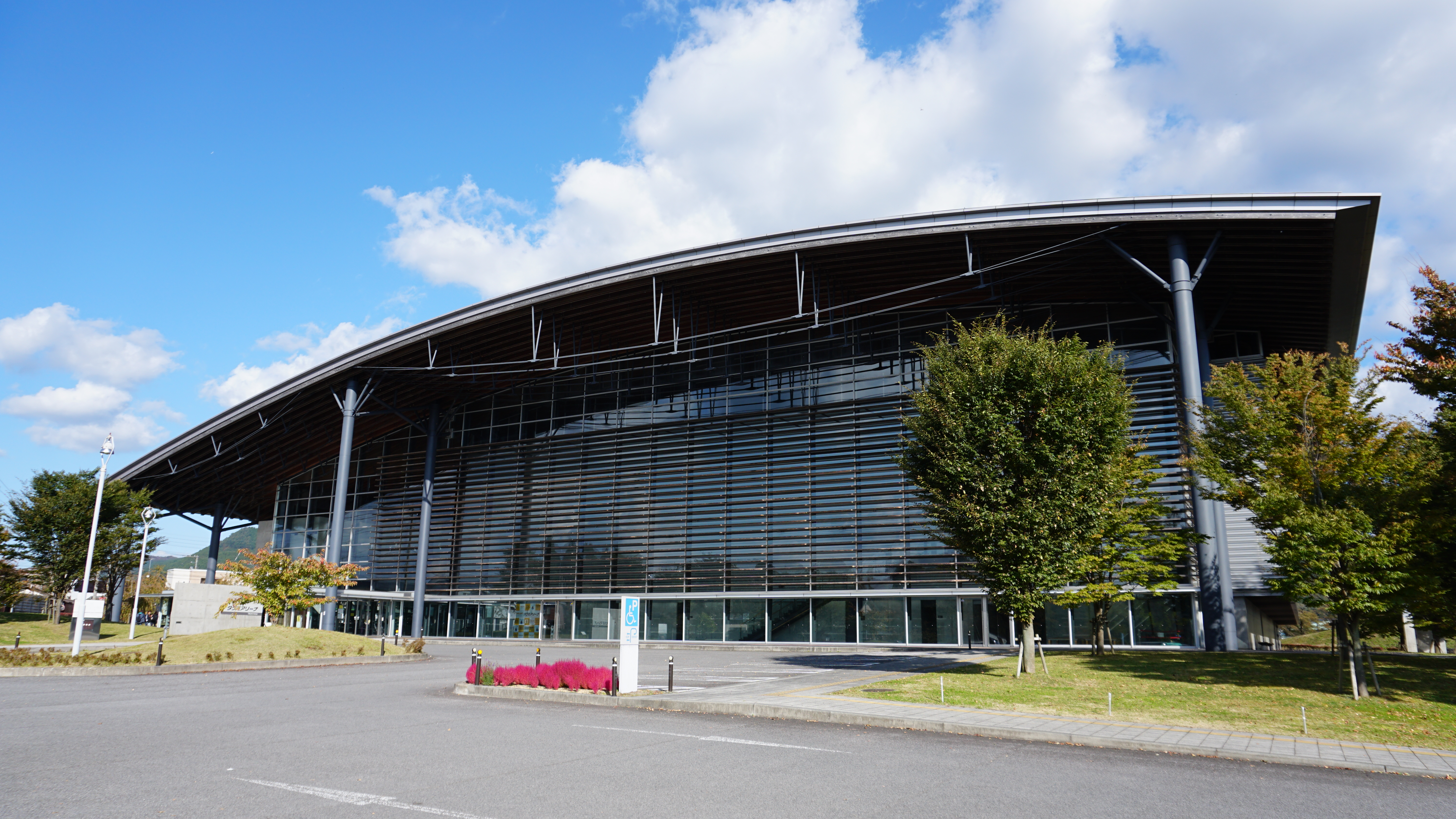

- Location within Akita Prefecture Location within Japan
- Interactive map of Takumi Arena
- Full name: Odate City Jukai Gymnasium
- Location: Odate, Japan
- Owner: Odate city
- Operator: Takumi Electric Industry
- Capacity: 2,100
- Field size: 8,335.04sqm

Construction
- Opened: 2005
- Architect: Ishimoto Architectural & Engineering Firm, Inc

Takumi Arena is an arena in Odate, Japan, neighboring Odate Jukai Dome. It opened in 2005 and holds 2,100 people. Takumi Electric Industry acquired its naming rights in 2017.

== Facilities ==
- Main arena - 2,394m^{2} (38m×63m)
- Sub arena - 660m^{2} (33m×20m)
- Training room
- Running course

== Attendance records ==
The record for a basketball game is 3,006, set on May 17, 2019, when the Alvark Tokyo defeated the Happinets 97–77.

== Access ==
From Odate Station : Shishigamori Kanjosen of Shuhoku Bus . Get off at Jukai Dome-mae. Shuhoku Bus for Kosaka. Get off at Jukai Dome Iriguchi.

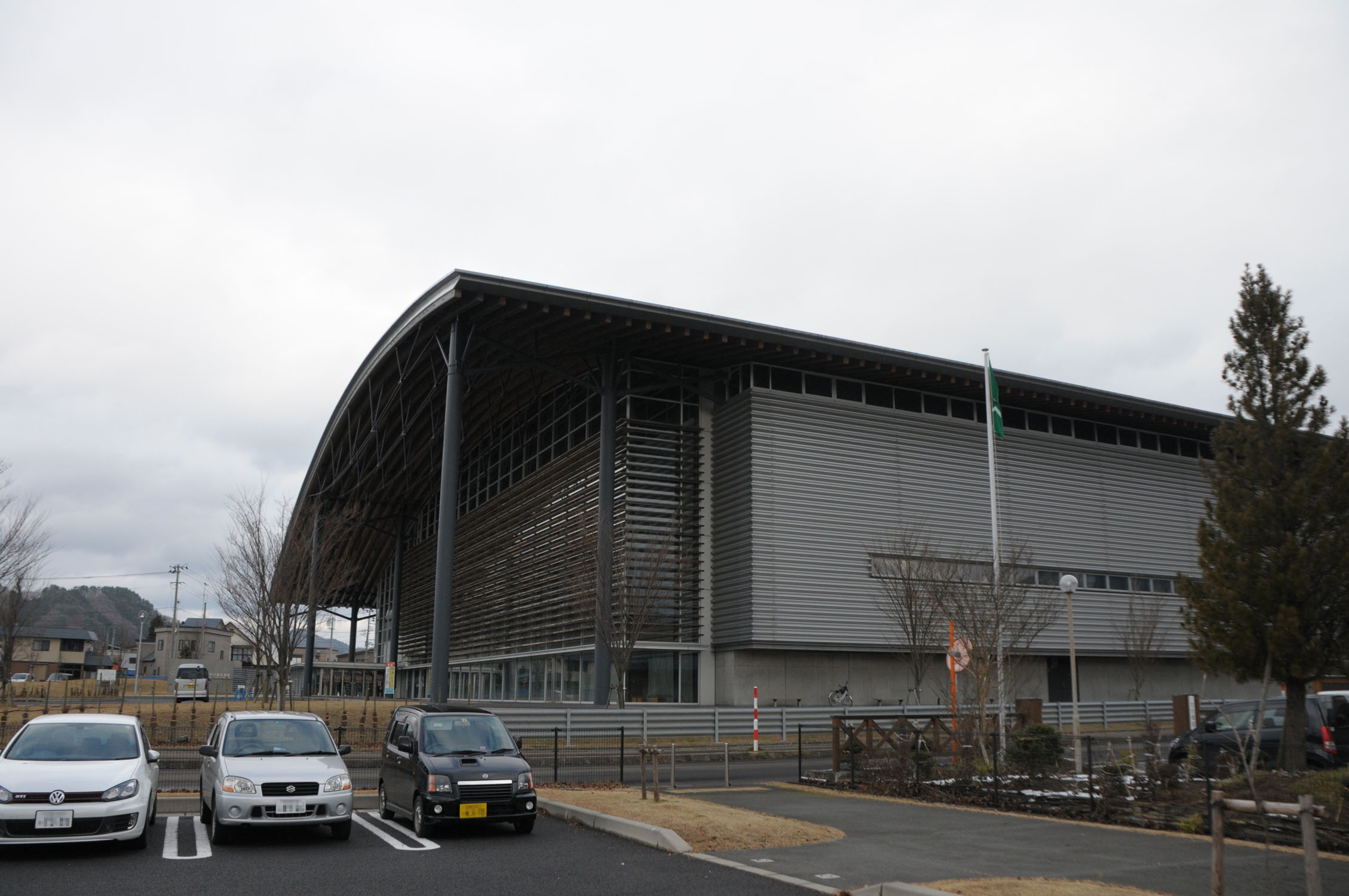
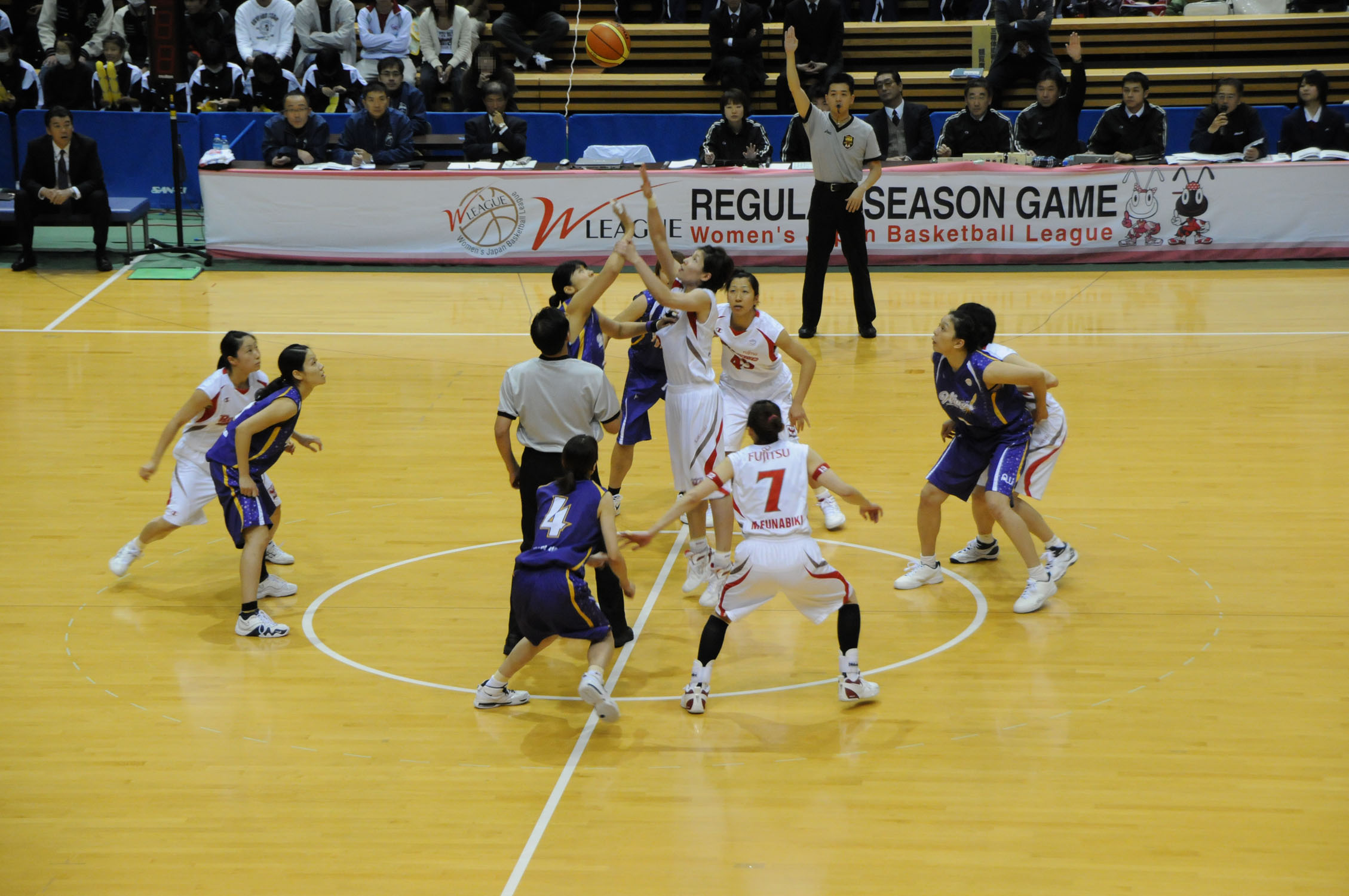

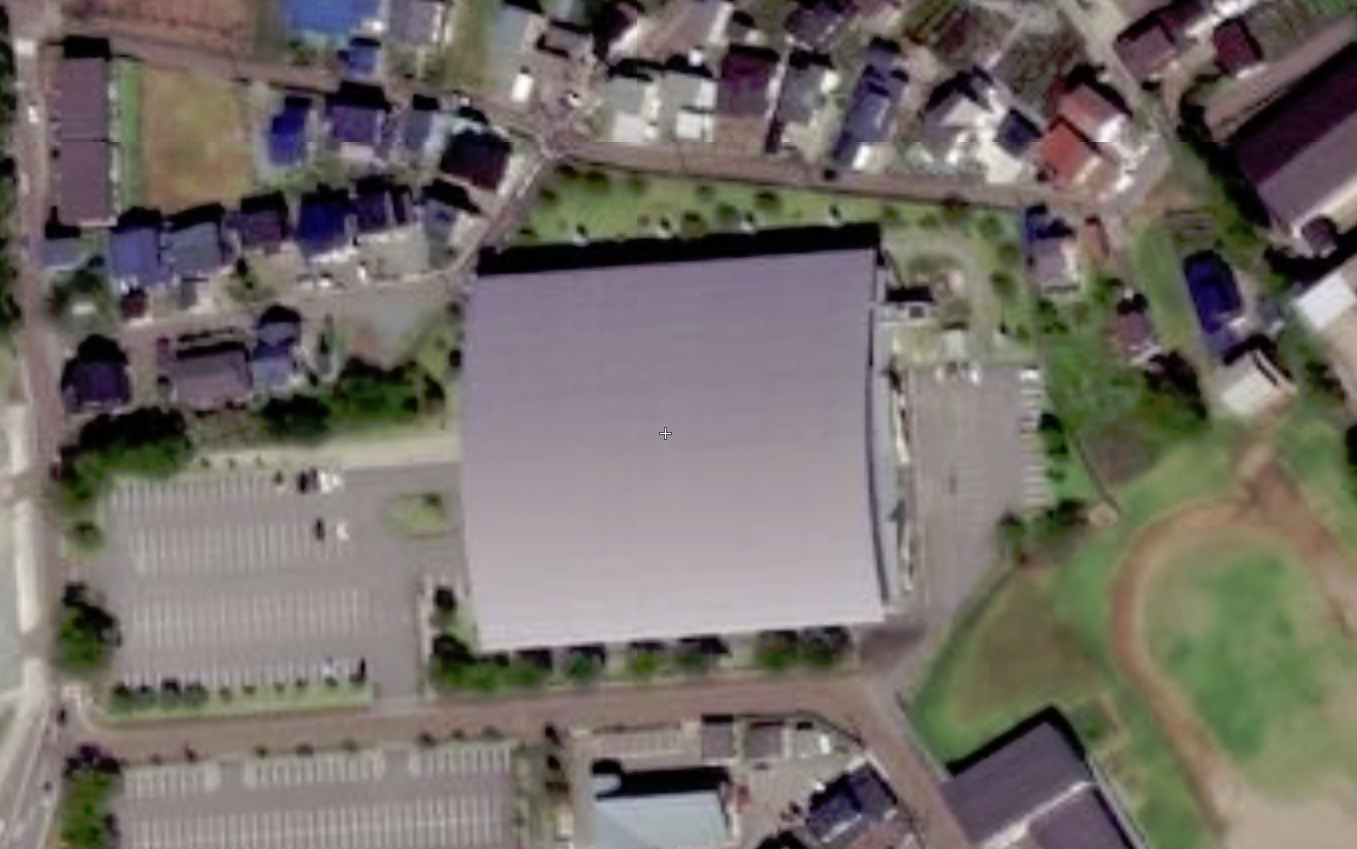
Satellite view
