= Odate City Naganeyama Sports Park =

Sports Park in Odate, Japan

Odate Naganeyama Athletic Stadium
- 大館市営長根山運動公園陸上競技場
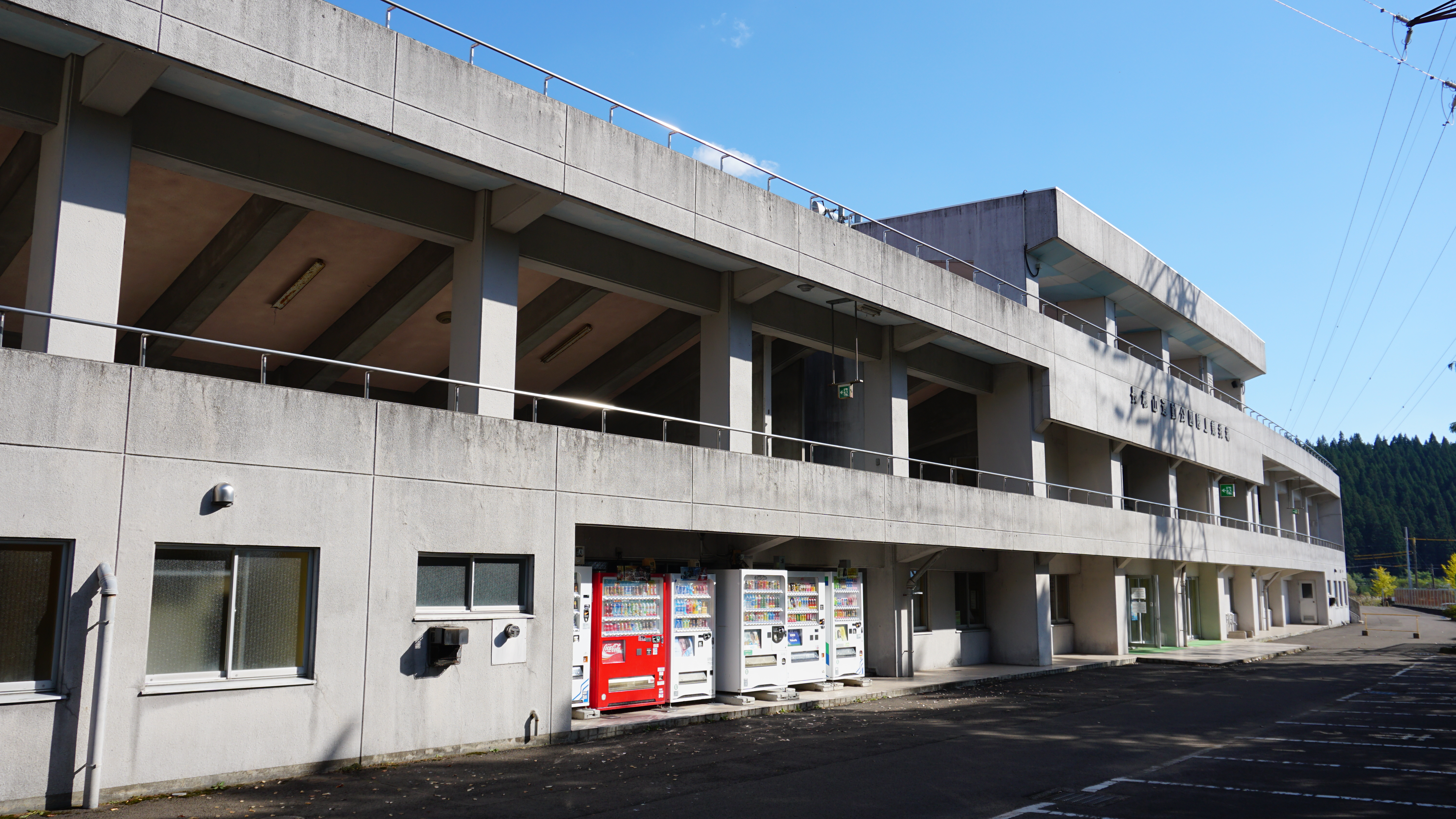
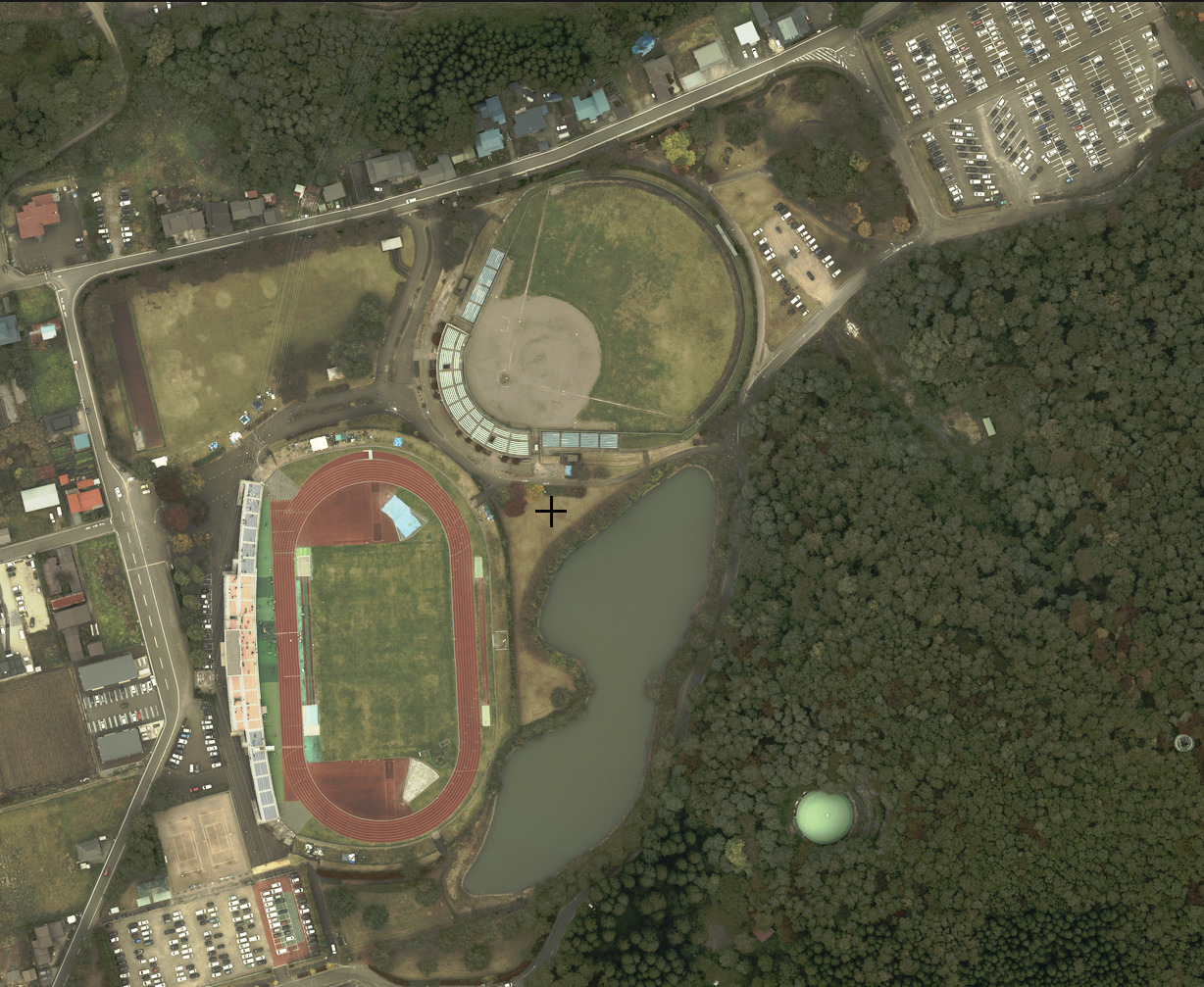

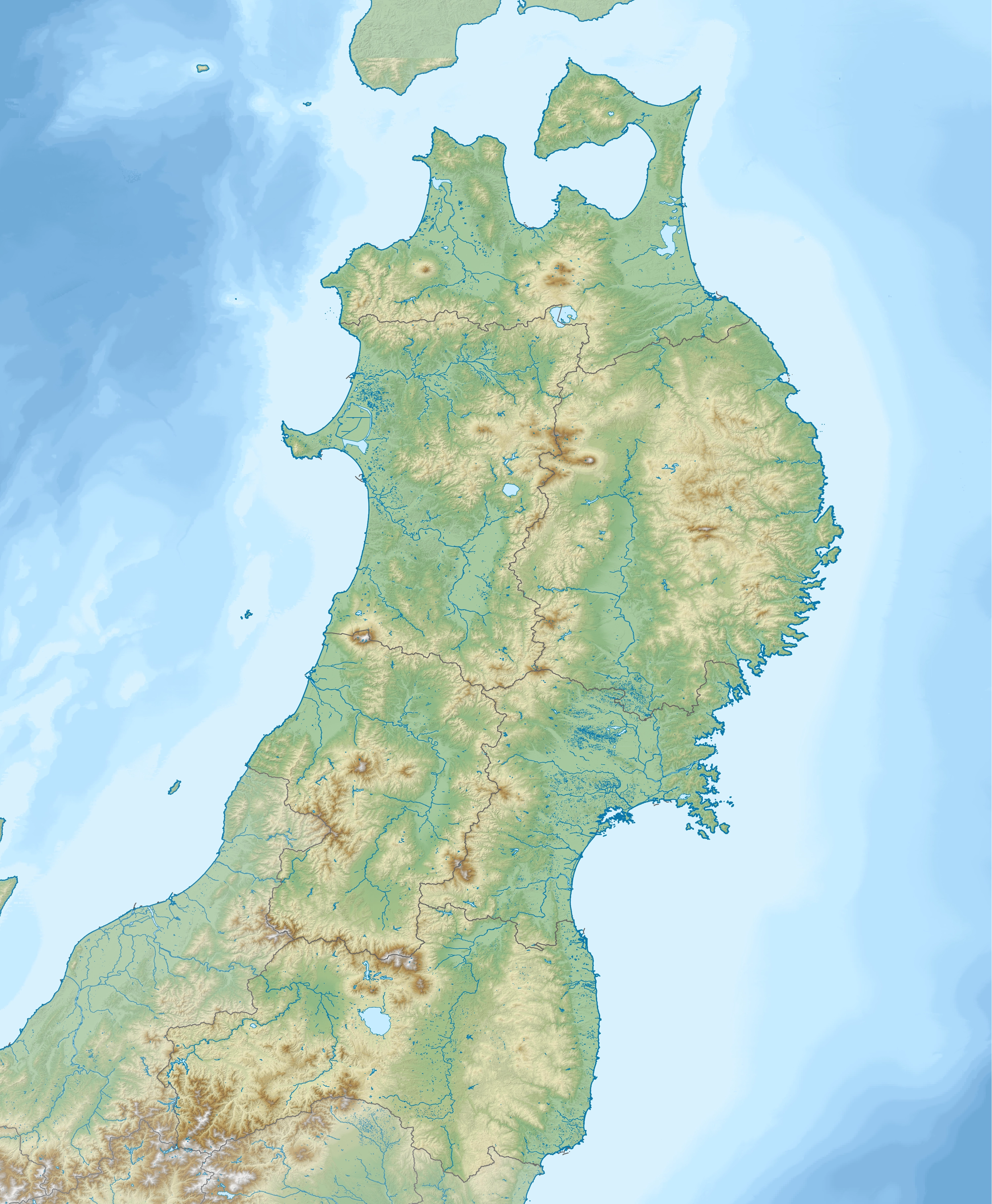
- Location within Akita Prefecture Location within Tohoku, Japan Location within Japan
- Interactive map of Odate Naganeyama Athletic Stadium
- Full name: Odate City Naganeyama Sports Park Athletic Field
- Location: 69-6 Higashidai, Odate, Akita, Japan
- Coordinates: 40°16′29.7″N 140°35′8.4″E
- Owner: City of Odate
- Operator: City of Odate
- Capacity: 6,000
- Surface: Turf

Construction
- Opened: 1983

Naganeyama Baseball Stadium
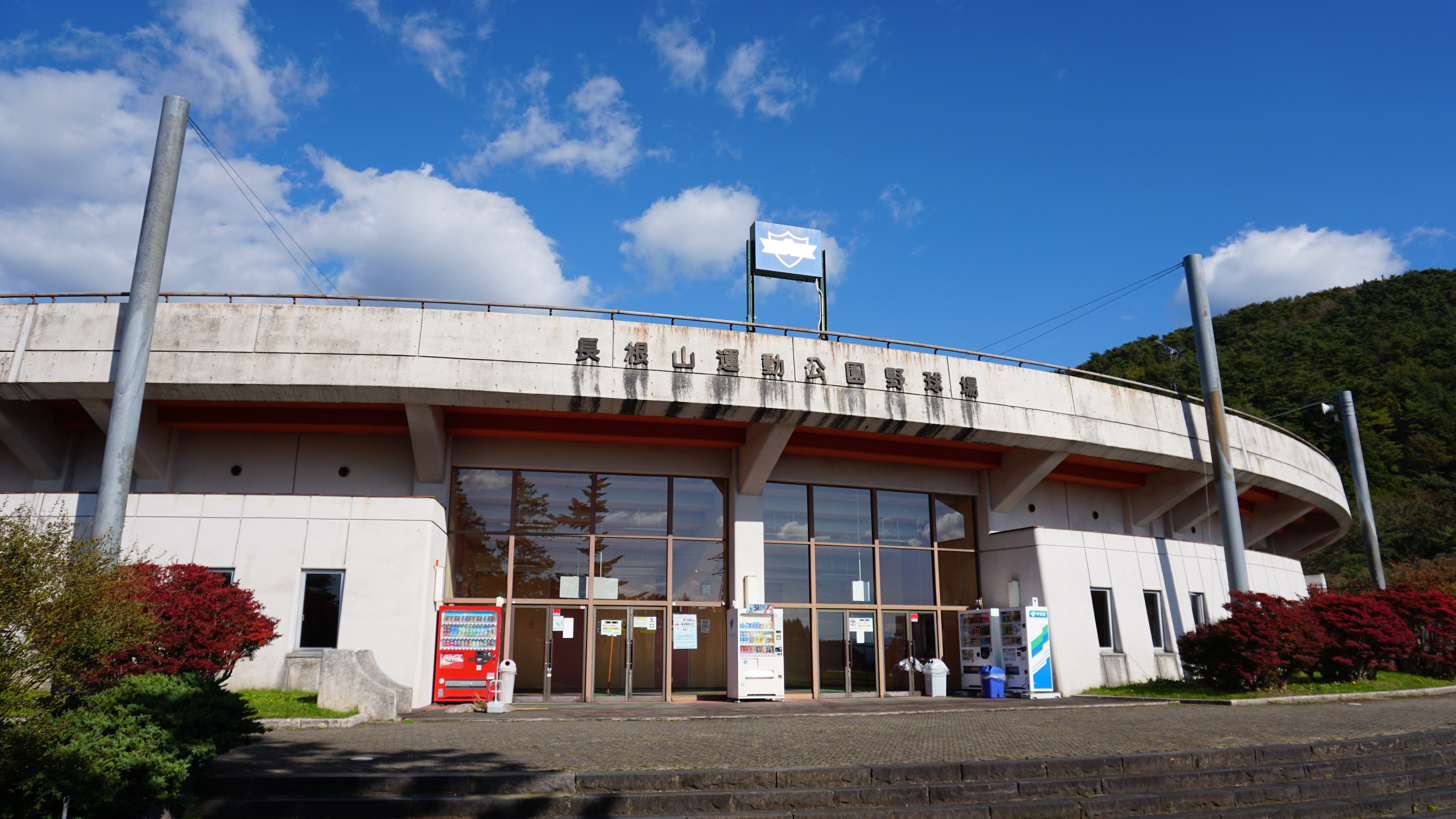
- Interactive map of Naganeyama Baseball Stadium
- Location: Odate, Akita, Japan
- Owner: City of Odate
- Operator: City of Odate
- Capacity: 4,700
- Field size: Left Field — 91 metres (299 ft); Center Field — 120 metres (394 ft); Right Field — 91 metres (299 ft)

Construction
- Opened: 1979

Odate City Naganeyama Ski Jumping Hill
- 長根山シャンツェ
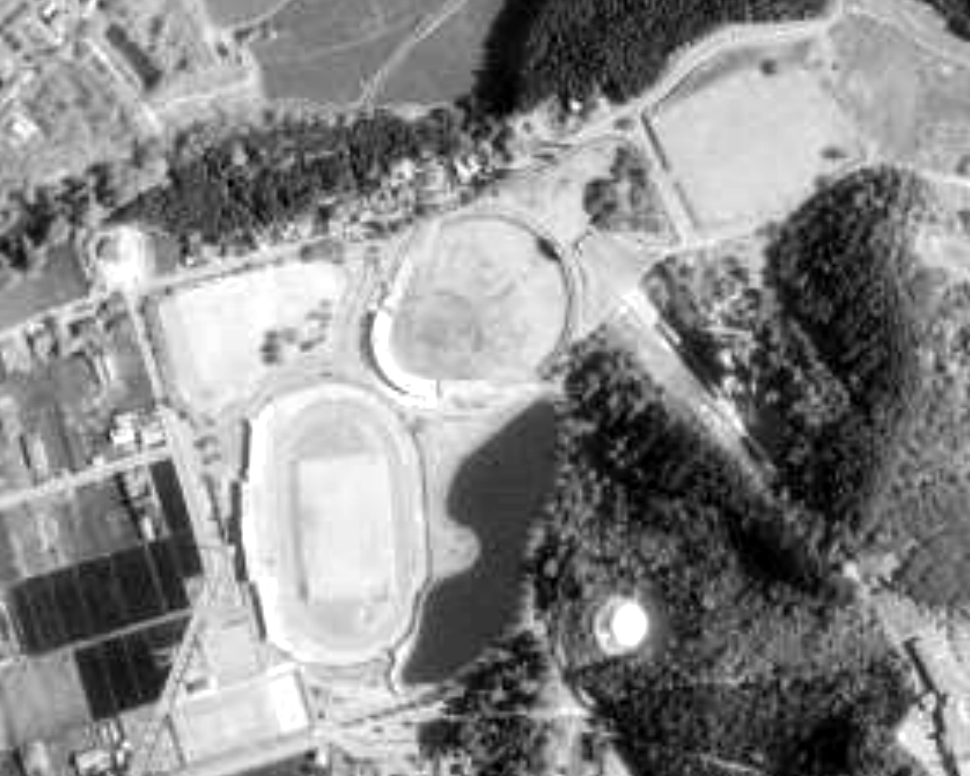
- Naganeyama Sports Park in 1986
- Location: Odate, Akita; Japan
- Operator: City of Odate
- Opened: 1931
- Renovated: 1981
- Closed: 1995

Size
- K–point: K-60 (1931-1980); K-50(1981-1995)

Odate City Naganeyama Sports Park Athletic Stadium (大館市営長根山運動公園陸上競技場) is a multi-purpose stadium in Odate, Akita, Japan. The stadium was originally opened in 1983 and has a capacity of 6,000 spectators. The Sports Park has a baseball stadium and tennis courts.

== Naganeyama Ski Jumping Hill ==
The Naganeyama Ski Jumping Hill (長根山ジャンプ競技場, Naganeyama Janpu Kyōgijō), also known as the Naganeyama-Schanze (長根山シャンツェ, Naganeyama Shantse) was a ski jumping venue located in the Naganeyama Sports Park in Odate, Akita, Japan.
