= Ogita =

Ogita or Ōgita may refer to

- Ōgita Station, a JR East railway station in Ōdate, Akita Prefecture, Japan
- Hiroki Ogita (born 1987), Japanese pole vaulter
