= Akita University of Nursing and Welfare =

Coordinates: 40.2809826°N 140.5536854°E

- 秋田看護福祉大学
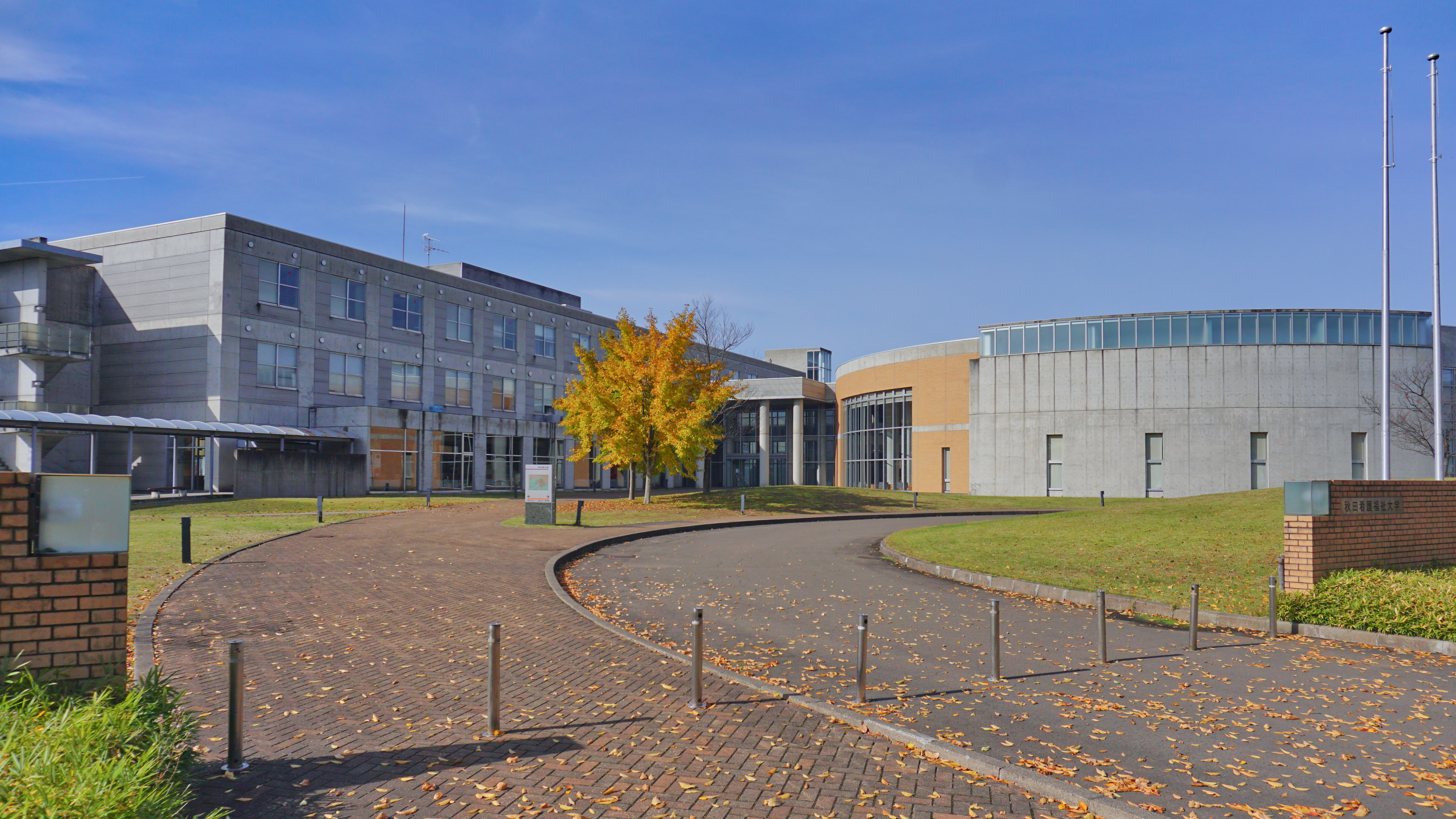
- Type: Private
- Established: 2005
- Location: Ōdate, Akita, Japan

Akita University of Nursing and Welfare (秋田看護福祉大学, Akita kango fukushi daigaku) is a private university in Ōdate, Akita Prefecture, Japan, established in 2005.
