= Jūnisho Station =

Railway station in Ōdate, Akita Prefecture, Japan

Jūnisho Station 十二所駅
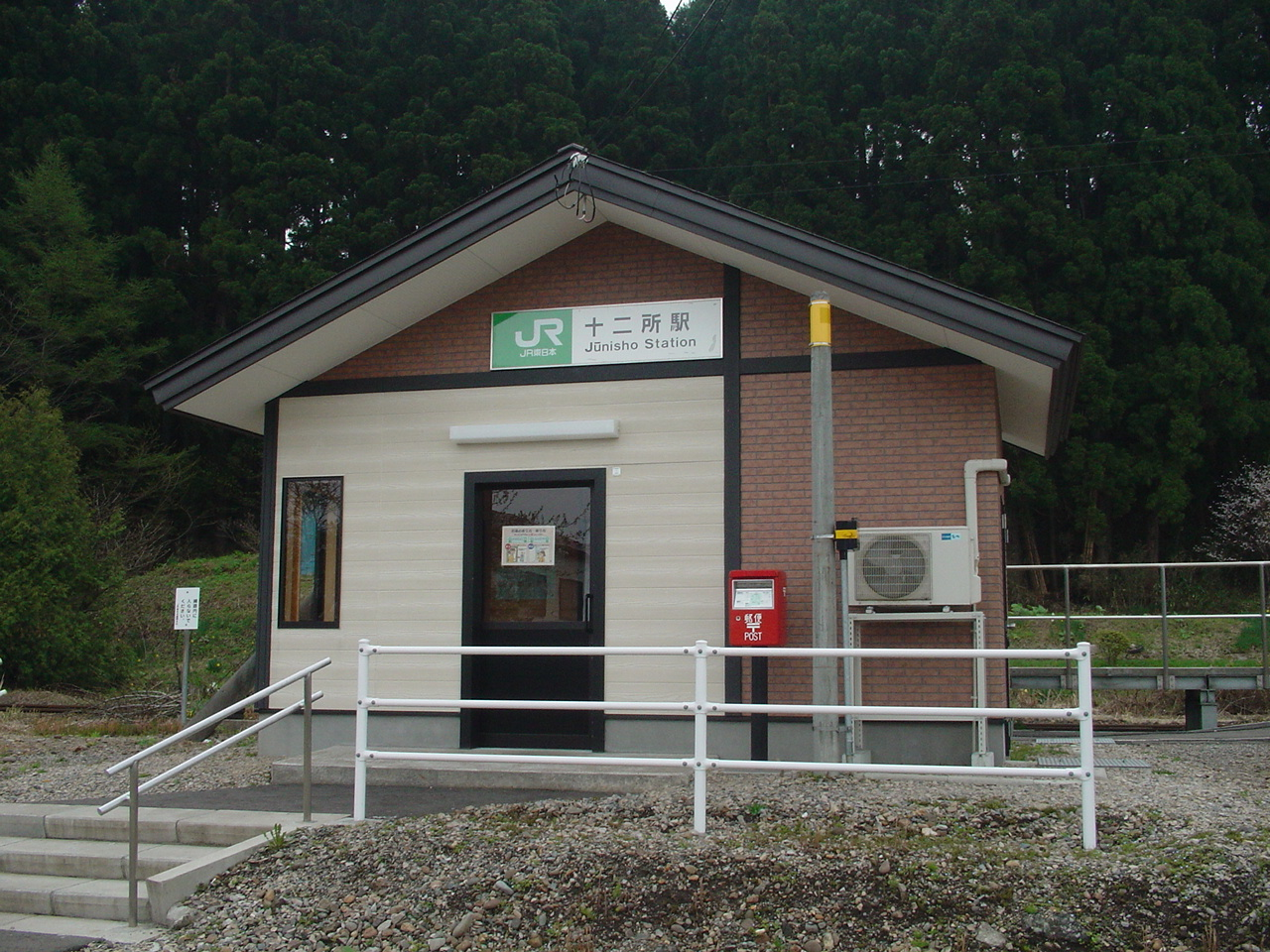
- Jūnisho Station, May 2007

General information
- Location: 42 Aramachi-42 Jūnisho, Ōdate-shi, Akita-ken 018-5601; Japan
- Coordinates: 40°12′52.32″N 140°40′6.12″E
- Operator: JR East
- Line: ■ Hanawa Line
- Distance: 89.6 kilometers from Kōma
- Platforms: 1 side platform

Other information
- Status: Unstaffed
- Website: Official website

History
- Opened: December 25, 1915

Services
| Preceding station | JR East | Following station |
|---|---|---|
| Ōtaki-Onsen towards Ōdate | Hanawa Line | Sawajiri towards Morioka |
Location
- Location within Akita Prefecture Location within Japan

Jūnisho Station (十二所駅, Jūnisho-eki) is a railway station located in the city of Ōdate, Akita Prefecture, Japan, operated by the East Japan Railway Company (JR East).

== Lines ==
Jūnisho Station is served by the Hanawa Line, and is located 89.6 km from the terminus of the line at Kōma.

== Station layout ==
The station consists of one side platform serving a single bi-directional track. The station is unattended.

== History ==
Jūnisho Station was opened on December 25, 1915, on the privately owned Akita Railways, serving the town of Jūnisho, Akita. The line was nationalized on June 1, 1934, becoming part of the Japanese Government Railways (JGR) system, which became the Japan National Railways (JNR) after World War II. The station became unstaffed in 1985. The station was absorbed into the JR East network upon the privatization of the JNR on April 1, 1987.

== Surrounding area ==
- National Route 103
- Yoneshiro River

== See also ==
- List of railway stations in Japan
