= Sawajiri Station =

Railway station in Ōdate, Akita Prefecture, Japan

Sawajiri Station 沢尻駅
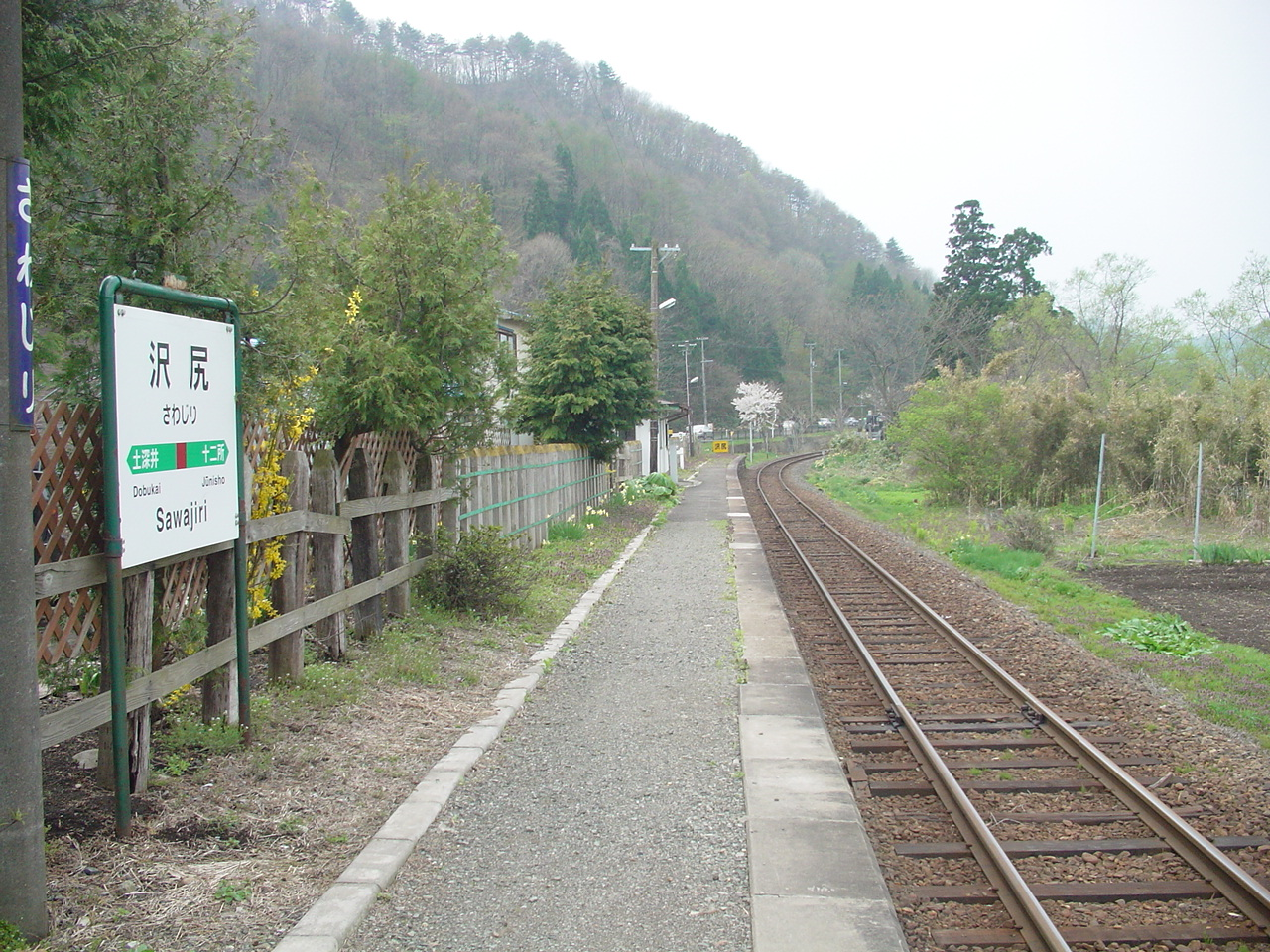
- Sawajiri Station, May 2007

General information
- Location: Kawabata-5 Jūnisho, Ōdate-shi, Akita-ken 018-5601; Japan
- Coordinates: 40°13′49.10″N 140°41′35.91″E
- Operator: JR East
- Line: ■ Hanawa Line
- Distance: 86.6 kilometers from Kōma
- Platforms: 1 side platform

Other information
- Status: Unstaffed
- Website: Official website

History
- Opened: July 11, 1928

Services
Preceding station	JR East	Following station
Jūnisho towards Ōdate	Hanawa Line	Dobukai towards Morioka
Location
- Location within Akita Prefecture Location within Japan

Sawajiri Station (沢尻駅, Sawajiri-eki) is a railway station located in the city of Ōdate, Akita Prefecture, Japan, operated by the East Japan Railway Company (JR East).

== Lines ==
Sawajiri Station is served by the Hanawa Line, and is located 86.6 km from the terminus of the line at Kōma.

== Station layout ==
The station consists of one side platform serving a single bi-directional track. The station is unattended.

== History ==
Sawajiri Station was opened on July 11, 1928 on the privately owned Akita Railways, serving the town of Jūnisho, Akita. The line was nationalized on June 1, 1934, becoming part of the Japanese Government Railways (JGR) system. The station was closed from November 11, 1944, reopening on February 1, 1962 as part of the Japan National Railways (JNR). The station was absorbed into the JR East network upon the privatization of the JNR on April 1, 1987.

== Surrounding area ==
- National Route 103

== See also ==
- List of railway stations in Japan
