= Ōtaki-Onsen Station =

Railway station in Ōdate, Akita Prefecture, Japan

Ōtaki-Onsen Station 大滝温泉駅
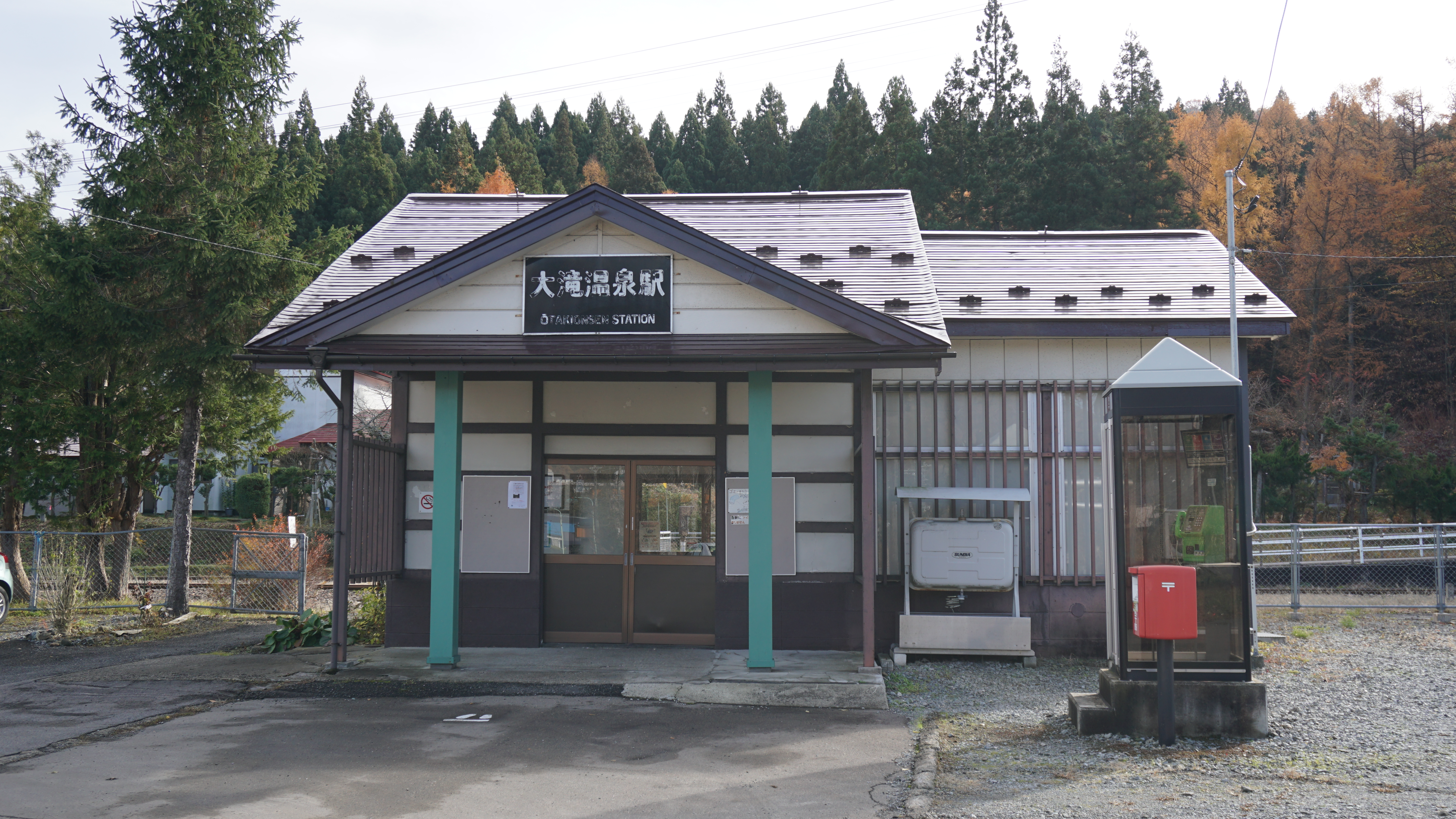
- Ōtaki-Onsen Station in November 2019

General information
- Location: 17 Jūnisho Aze Kami-Kawashiro, Ōdate-shi, Akita-ken 018-5601; Japan
- Coordinates: 40°12′36.74″N 140°38′25.35″E
- Operator: JR East
- Line: ■ Hanawa Line
- Distance: 92.1 kilometers from Kōma
- Platforms: 1 island platform

Other information
- Status: Unstaffed
- Website: Official website

History
- Opened: January 19, 1915

Services
| Preceding station | JR East | Following station |
|---|---|---|
| Ōgita towards Ōdate | Hanawa Line | Jūnisho towards Morioka |
Location
- Location within Akita Prefecture Location within Japan

Ōtaki-Onsen Station (大滝温泉駅, Ōtaki-Onsen-eki) is a railway station located in the city of Ōdate, Akita Prefecture, Japan, operated by the East Japan Railway Company (JR East).

== Lines ==
Ōtaki-Onsen Station is served by the Hanawa Line, and is located 92.1 km from the terminus of the line at Kōma.

== Station layout ==
The station consists of a single island platform serving two tracks, connected to the station building by a level crossing. The station is unattended.

=== Platforms ===
| 1 | ■ Hanawa Line | for Kazuno-Hanawa, Morioka |
| 2 | ■ Hanawa Line | for Ōdate |

== History ==
Ōtaki-Onsen Station was opened on January 19, 1915 on the privately owned Akita Railways, serving the town of Jūnisho, Akita. The line was nationalized on June 1, 1934, becoming part of the Japanese Government Railways (JGR) system, which became the Japan National Railways (JNR) after World War II. The station was absorbed into the JR East network upon the privatization of the JNR on April 1, 1987. The station had its wooden railway signals removed in September 1999 was made an unstaffed station in December of the same year.

== Surrounding area ==
- Ōtaki Onsen
- National Route 103 Bypass

== See also ==
- List of railway stations in Japan
