= Ōdate =

Ōdate 大館市
- City
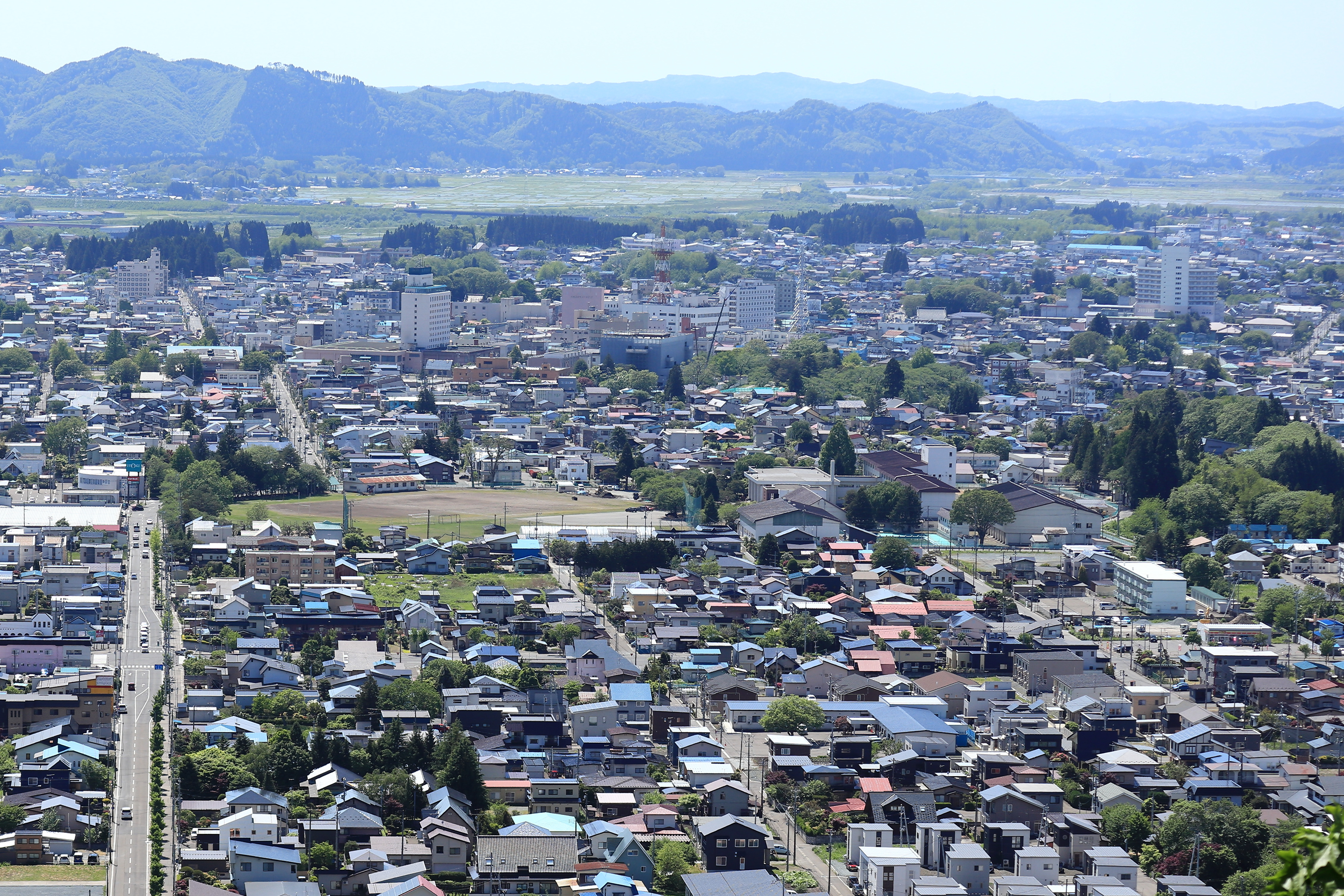
- Panorama view of Ōdate

- Flag Seal
- Location of Ōdate in Akita Prefecture

- Coordinates: 40°16′17″N 140°33′51″E
- Country: Japan
- Region: Tōhoku
- Prefecture: Akita

Government
  - Mayor: Kensuke Ishida

Area
  - Total: 913.22 km^{2} (352.60 sq mi)

Population (2025)
  - Total: 63,256
  - Density: 69.267/km^{2} (179.40/sq mi)
- Time zone: UTC+9 (Japan Standard Time)
- Phone number: 0186-49-3111
- Address: 20 Nakajō, Ōdate-shi, Akita-ken 017-8555
- Climate: Cfa/Dfa
- Website: Official website
- Symbols
- Flower: Chrysanthemum
- Tree: Akita sugi

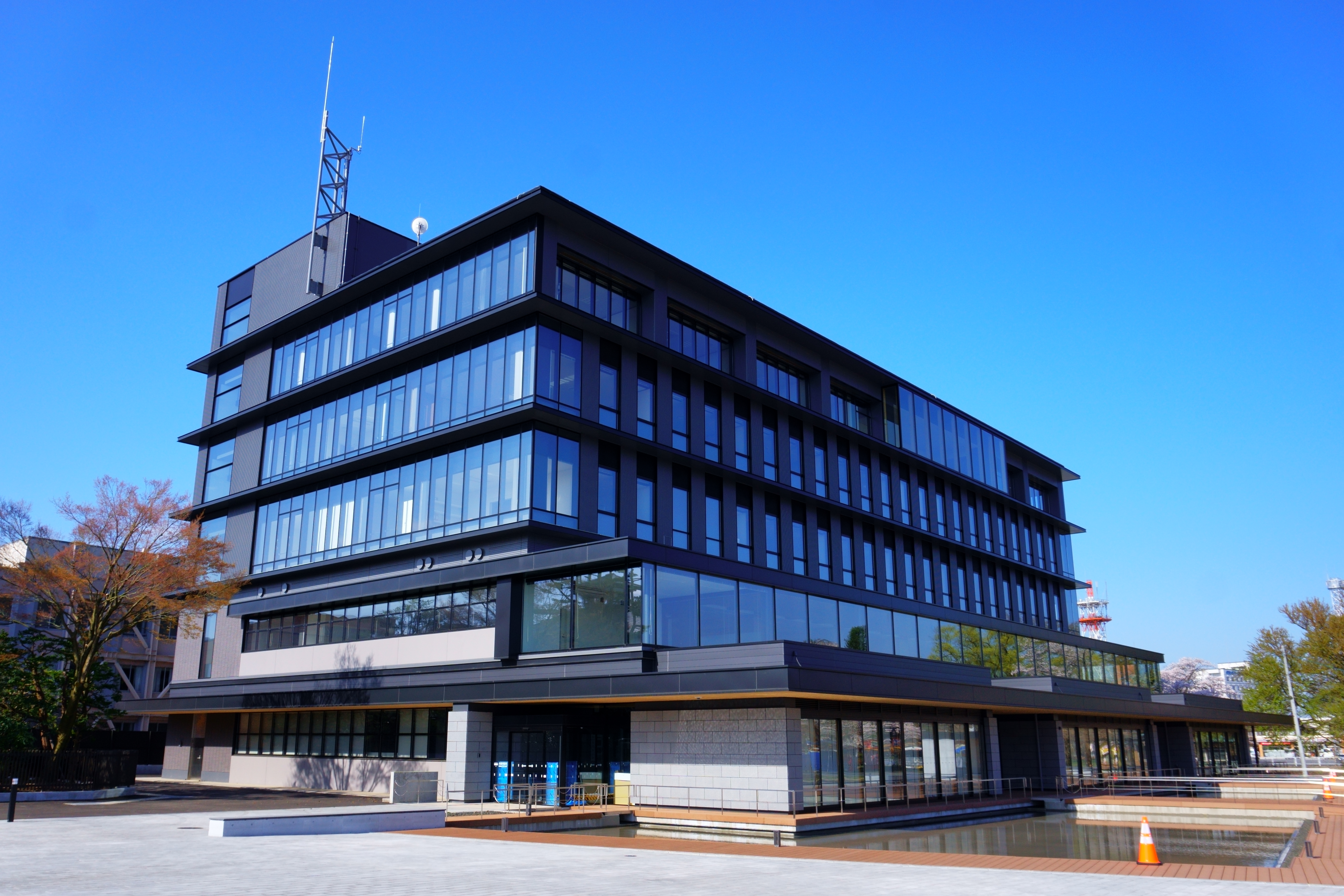
Ōdate City Hall

Ōdate (大館市, Ōdate-shi; Japanese pronunciation: [ò̞ó̞.dä́.té̞(.ɕì), ó̞ó̞.dä́.té̞(.ɕì), ó̞ò̞.dä̀.tè̞]) is a city in Akita Prefecture, Japan. As of 28 February 2023, the city had an estimated population of 67,865 in 31,433 households, and a population density of 75 persons per km^{2}. The total area of the city is 913.22 square kilometres (352.60 sq mi).

== Geography ==
Ōdate is located in the mountains of northern Akita Prefecture, with the Ōu Mountains on the east and Aomori Prefecture to the north. The city is a basin surrounded by mountains on all sides. The mountains in the north are lined with 1,000-meter-class peaks, with Mount Tashiro located at the eastern end of the Shirakami Mountain as the main peak. In the south is the Hinai mountain range, with Ryugamori as the main peak. The Yoneshiro River, one of Akita's three major rivers, runs through the center of the city from east to west, followed by the Sai River and Hikikazu River flowing from the south, and the Nagagi River, Iwase River, and Hayaguchi River flowing from the northeast. Part of the city is within the borders of the Towada-Hachimantai National Park. Much of the city area is covered in forest. Due to its inland location, the city is noted for its heavy snowfall in winter.

=== Neighboring municipalities ===
Akita Prefecture

- Fujisato
- Kazuno
- Kitaakita
- Kosaka

Aomori Prefecture

- Hirakawa
- Hirosaki
- Nishimeya
- Owani

== Climate ==
Ōdate has a humid continental climate (Köppen climate classification Dfa) with large seasonal temperature differences, with warm to hot (and often humid) summers and cold (sometimes severely cold) winters. Precipitation is significant throughout the year, but is heaviest from August to October. The average annual temperature in Ōdate is 10.3 °C (50.5 °F). The average annual rainfall is 1,741.0 mm (68.54 in) with July as the wettest month. The temperatures are highest on average in August, at around 23.6 °C (74.5 °F), and lowest in January, at around −2.0 °C (28.4 °F).

Climate data for Ōdate (elevation 49 m, 1991–2020 normals, extremes 1976–present)
Month	Jan	Feb	Mar	Apr	May	Jun	Jul	Aug	Sep	Oct	Nov	Dec	Year
Record high °C (°F)	10.8 (51.4)	20.2 (68.4)	23.9 (75.0)	30.8 (87.4)	33.2 (91.8)	35.1 (95.2)	38.1 (100.6)	38.8 (101.8)	37.0 (98.6)	28.6 (83.5)	23.8 (74.8)	16.9 (62.4)	38.8 (101.8)
Mean daily maximum °C (°F)	1.6 (34.9)	2.9 (37.2)	7.1 (44.8)	14.8 (58.6)	20.8 (69.4)	24.7 (76.5)	27.6 (81.7)	29.0 (84.2)	24.9 (76.8)	18.2 (64.8)	10.9 (51.6)	4.0 (39.2)	15.5 (59.9)
Daily mean °C (°F)	−2.0 (28.4)	−1.4 (29.5)	2.0 (35.6)	8.2 (46.8)	14.4 (57.9)	18.8 (65.8)	22.5 (72.5)	23.6 (74.5)	19.0 (66.2)	12.0 (53.6)	5.7 (42.3)	0.2 (32.4)	10.2 (50.4)
Mean daily minimum °C (°F)	−5.9 (21.4)	−5.8 (21.6)	−2.7 (27.1)	2.3 (36.1)	8.7 (47.7)	13.9 (57.0)	18.6 (65.5)	19.4 (66.9)	14.5 (58.1)	7.0 (44.6)	1.3 (34.3)	−3.1 (26.4)	5.7 (42.3)
Record low °C (°F)	−19.0 (−2.2)	−17.9 (−0.2)	−14.9 (5.2)	−8.5 (16.7)	−2.1 (28.2)	4.6 (40.3)	9.4 (48.9)	9.9 (49.8)	2.7 (36.9)	−2.1 (28.2)	−8.0 (17.6)	−15.8 (3.6)	−19.0 (−2.2)
Average precipitation mm (inches)	108.2 (4.26)	92.6 (3.65)	106.1 (4.18)	118.5 (4.67)	126.4 (4.98)	121.6 (4.79)	216.6 (8.53)	214.0 (8.43)	164.8 (6.49)	163.2 (6.43)	162.0 (6.38)	139.2 (5.48)	1,741 (68.54)
Average precipitation days (≥ 1.0 mm)	19.8	17.0	15.7	12.7	12.4	10.4	13.0	11.7	12.3	14.8	17.2	20.2	176.7
Mean monthly sunshine hours	59.2	82.7	132.0	165.9	185.6	174.9	147.4	176.4	145.9	131.2	91.1	57.9	1,541.5
Source: Japan Meteorological Agency (1991–2020 normals, extremes 1976–present)

== Demographics ==
Per Japanese census data, the population of Ōdate peaked in the 1960s and has been in decline since then.

Historical population

Year	Pop.	±% p.a.
1920	64,055	—
1930	70,629	+0.98%
1940	75,333	+0.65%
1950	96,841	+2.54%
1960	103,531	+0.67%
1970	97,856	−0.56%

Year	Pop.	±% p.a.
1980	95,529	−0.24%
1990	90,098	−0.58%
2000	86,288	−0.43%
2010	78,951	−0.88%
2020	69,237	−1.30%

== History ==
The area of present-day Ōdate was part of ancient Dewa Province, and numerous Jomon period ruins have been found within city limits. Populated by Emishi tribes, it remained outside of the control of the Yamato court until well into the Heian period. The first mention of "Hinai", the area of central Ōdate is in the Nihon Sandai Jitsuroku in an article on the Gangyo War of 878, in which Hinai is listed as one of the villages under the control of Akita Castle. During the Edo period, the area came under the control of the Satake clan, who ruled the northern third of the province from Kubota Domain, and who maintained a secondary fortification at Ōdate Castle. The castle was destroyed during the Boshin War..

After the start of the Meiji period, the area became part of Kitaakita District, Akita Prefecture in 1878. The town of Ōdate was established on April 1, 1889 with the establishment of the modern municipalities system. During the Meiji period, the discovery of "black ore" (sphalerite and galena - a mixture of zinc, lead, gold, silver, and other precious metals), led to the development of numerous mines in the area, including the Hanaoka mine; however, the deposits were depleted by the mid-Shōwa period.

Ōdate was raised to city status on April 1, 1951. On June 20, 2005, the towns of Hinai and Tashiro (both from Kitaakita District) were merged into Ōdate, almost doubling the city's area.

== Government ==
Ōdate has a mayor-council form of government with a directly elected mayor and a unicameral city legislature of 26 members. The city contributes three members to the Akita Prefectural Assembly. In terms of national politics, the city is part of Akita District 2 of the lower house of the Diet of Japan.

== Economy ==
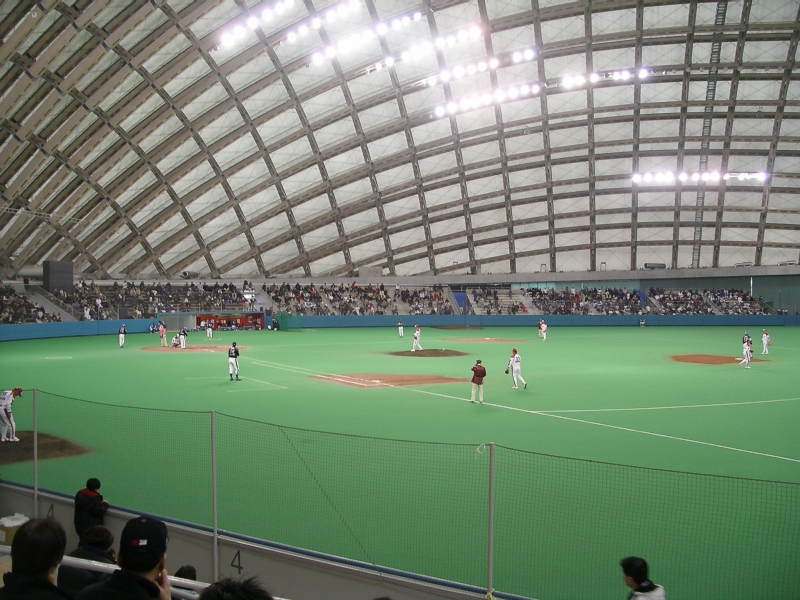
The Nipro Hachiko Dome baseball stadium

The economy of Ōdate is based on agriculture, forestry and seasonal tourism.

== Education ==
- Akita University of Nursing and Welfare
- Ōdate has 17 public elementary schools and eight public middle schools operated by the city government, and one national junior high school. The city has three public high schools operated by the Akita Prefectural Board of Education. The prefecture also operates one special education school for the handicapped.

== Transportation ==
=== Airports ===
- Odate-Noshiro Airport

=== Railway ===
East Japan Railway Company – Ōu Main Line

  - Hayaguchi – Shimokawazoi – Ōdate – Shirasawa – Jimba

East Japan Railway Company – Hanawa Line

- Sawajiri – Jūnisho – Ōtaki-Onsen – Ōgita – Higashi-Ōdate – Ōdate

=== Highways ===
- Akita Expressway
- National Route 7
- National Route 103
- National Route 285

== Notable people and dog from Ōdate ==
- Ginko Abukawa-Chiba, gymnast
- Yasushi Akashi, United Nations administrator, January 2001 – June 2003
- Shoeki Ando, philosopher
- Hachikō, loyal dog
- Hirohide Ishida, politician
- Hiroshi Ishikawa, film director
- Hirokazu Inoue , actor
- Takiji Kobayashi, writer
- Fuyukichi Maki, actor
- Masahiko Nagasawa, film director
- Nobuhiro Omiya, politician
- Takuya Sugawara, professional wrestler
- Dick Togo, professional wrestler
- Bin Uehara, singer
- Keizo Yamada, long-distance runner

== Attractions ==
- Railway Park (Kosaka Railway Museum) - formerly a depot for Kosaka Smelting & Refining Kosaka Line until closing in 2009. A Tokyu 5000 series (1954) metro carriage relocated from Shibuya Station in Tokyo in 2020 and now the park visitors center. Park features signs interpreting the history of Kosaka Railway.
- Akitainu Visitors Center - facility commemorating Hachikō.
