= Dobukai Station =

Railway station in Kazuno, Akita Prefecture, Japan

Dobukai Station 土深井駅
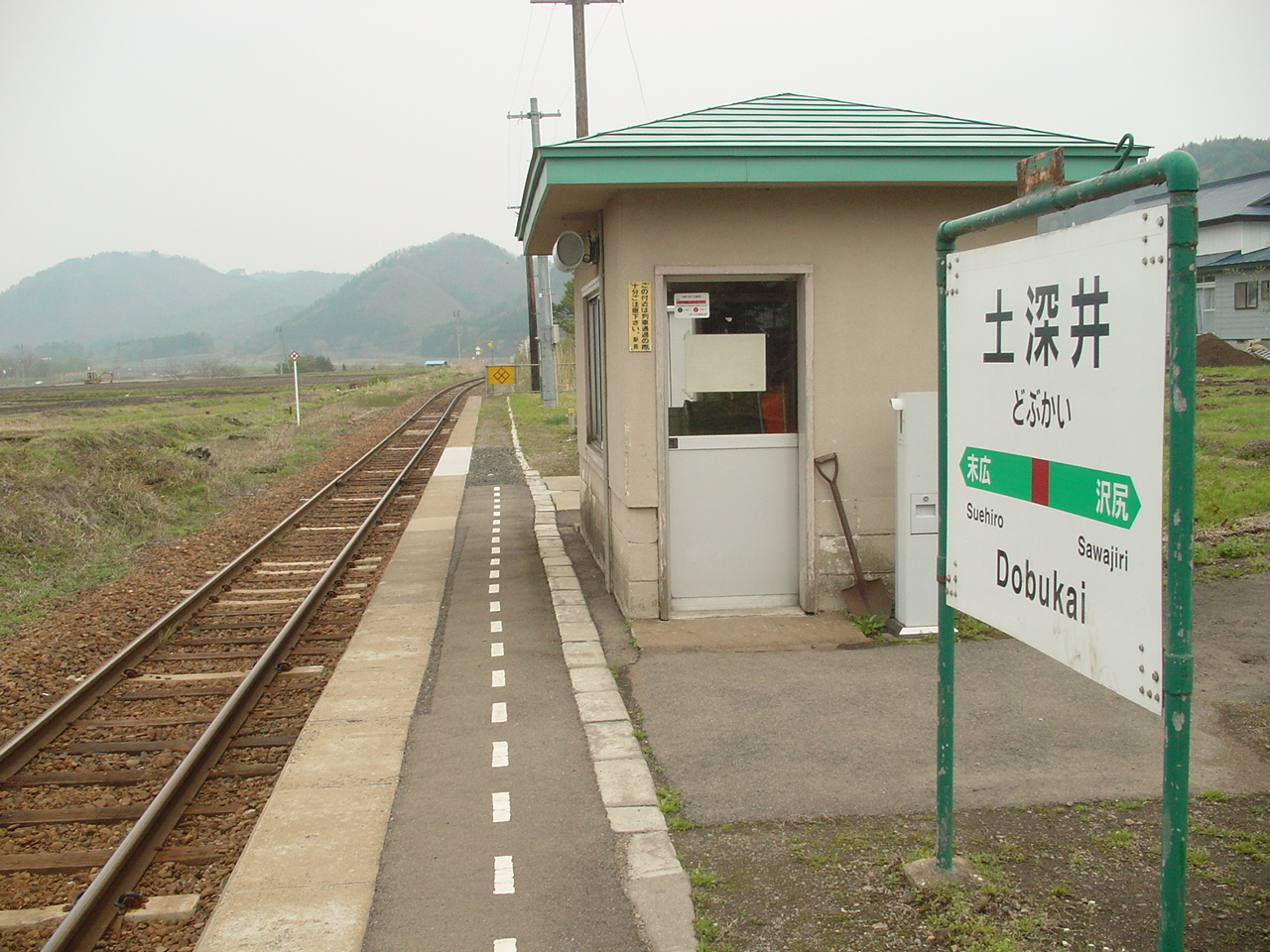
- Dobukai Station in May 2007

General information
- Location: Towada-Suehiro aze, Kazuno-shi, Akita-ken 018-5337; Japan
- Coordinates: 40°13′20.88″N 140°42′46.38″E
- Operator: JR East
- Line: ■ Hanawa Line
- Distance: 84.6 km from Kōma
- Platforms: 1 side platform
- Tracks: 1

Construction
- Structure type: At grade

Other information
- Status: Unstaffed
- Website: Official website

History
- Opened: December 25, 1919
- Former names: Osarizawa Station (to 1942)

Services
Preceding station	JR East	Following station
Sawajiri towards Ōdate	Hanawa Line	Suehiro towards Morioka
Location
- Location within Japan

Dobukai Station (土深井駅, Dobukai-eki) is a JR East railway station located in the city of Kazuno, Akita Prefecture, Japan.

== Lines ==
Dobukai Station is served by the Hanawa Line, and is located 84.6 rail kilometers from the terminus of the line at Kōma Station.

== Station layout ==
Dobukai Station consists of a single side platform serving one bi-directional track. The station is unattended.

== History ==
Dobukai Station was opened for freight services only on December 25, 1915, as Osarizawa Station (尾去沢駅) on the privately owned Akita Railways, serving the village of Nishikigi, Akita. Passenger services began from January 6, 1916. The line was nationalized on June 1, 1934, becoming part of the Japanese Government Railways (JGR) system. The station was renamed to its present name on April 1, 1942. The JGR became the Japan National Railways (JNR) after World War II. The station has been unattended since February 1, 1962. The station was absorbed into the JR East network upon the privatization of the JNR on April 1, 1987.

== Surrounding area ==
- Route 103

== See also ==
- List of railway stations in Japan
