= Masahiko Nagasawa =

Japanese film director (born 1965)

Masahiko Nagasawa (長澤 雅彦 Nagasawa Masahiko, born 28 February 1965 in Akita, Japan) is a Japanese film director. He was given a Best New Director award for his film Koko ni irukoto at the 2002 Yokohama Film Festival.

== Filmography ==
1. Killing Angel (? on trans.) (皆殺しの天使) (1997) (Video)
2. Being Here (Koko ni iru koto, ココニイルコト) (2001)
3. Seoul (ソウル) (2002)
4. Graduation (Sotsugyou, 卒業) (2002)
5. Thirteen Steps (13階段) (2003)
6. Way of Blue Sky (Aozoranoyukue) (2005)
7. Night Time Picnic (Yoru no pikunikku) (2006)
8. Faraway Heaven (Tengoku wa mada tôku) (2008)
