= Andō Shōeki =

Japanese philosopher

Andō Shōeki (安藤 昌益; 1703 – November 29, 1762) was a Japanese philosopher of the 18th century. He rejected much of the Buddhist and Confucian thinking prevailing in Edo period Japan. He also opposed feudalism in the political system. Shoeki never became a prominent philosopher, and throughout his life he had few followers compared to other beliefs in Japan.

== Ideology ==
Ando Shoeki believed that recorded history was a deviation from the natural order of the world, and began with the advent of writing and the rise in power of specific groups, like government officials, priests, or scholars. These groups instituted laws, and began what Shoeki called the "World of Law". In Shoekian thought, the "World of Law" was flawed, unnatural, and unequal. He wanted all humans to have the same social status because Shoeki believed that all humans were, in reality, the same person, and it was impossible for one to truly be above another. It was also important for Shoeki that humans only produce and consume what was necessary, a state which he called the "Right Cultivation." Once every human was equal and had abandoned the "World of Law", Shoeki believed that mankind would finally enter the "Self-Acting World", a kind of paradise on Earth, although Shoeki believed that this would only be possible if the "Right Man", a messiah-like figure, arrived and fixed the world. Shoeki did not consider himself to be the "Right Man"; he was content to wait for him to arrive.

== Metaphysics ==
Shoekian metaphysics involves the transfer of energy in all living things. Shoeki believed that each type of organism had a different vector of energy: human energy went up because humans walked upright; animal energy went side-to-side because they crawled and because they ate each other in what Shoeki described as a sideways line; plant energy went down because they always were on the ground. These energies could be transferred across organisms to create new life as well. Humans, for example, are made from the excess energy in wheat, and mice are born from the smoke of a human's fire.

== The Five Terrible Crimes and The Ten Offenses ==
To show some of the ways to achieve the Right Cultivation, Shoeki made a series of laws named Buddhist rules and principles in an effort to satirize Buddhist thoughts. Each of these laws demonstrate some aspect of his anti-establishment ideology.

=== The Five Terrible Crimes ===
- Becoming a leader of men
- Consuming greedily
- Teaching about social relations
- Polygamy
- Being concerned with money or metals

=== The Ten Offenses ===
- Making music
- Playing Go (game)
- Sacrificing animals
- Establishing borders
- Being part of the warrior class
- Giving the warrior class authority
- Being an artisan
- Trading goods
- Crafting expensive things
- Writing and being an arrogant writer
