= Nipro Hachiko Dome =

Stadium in Ōdate, Akita, Japan

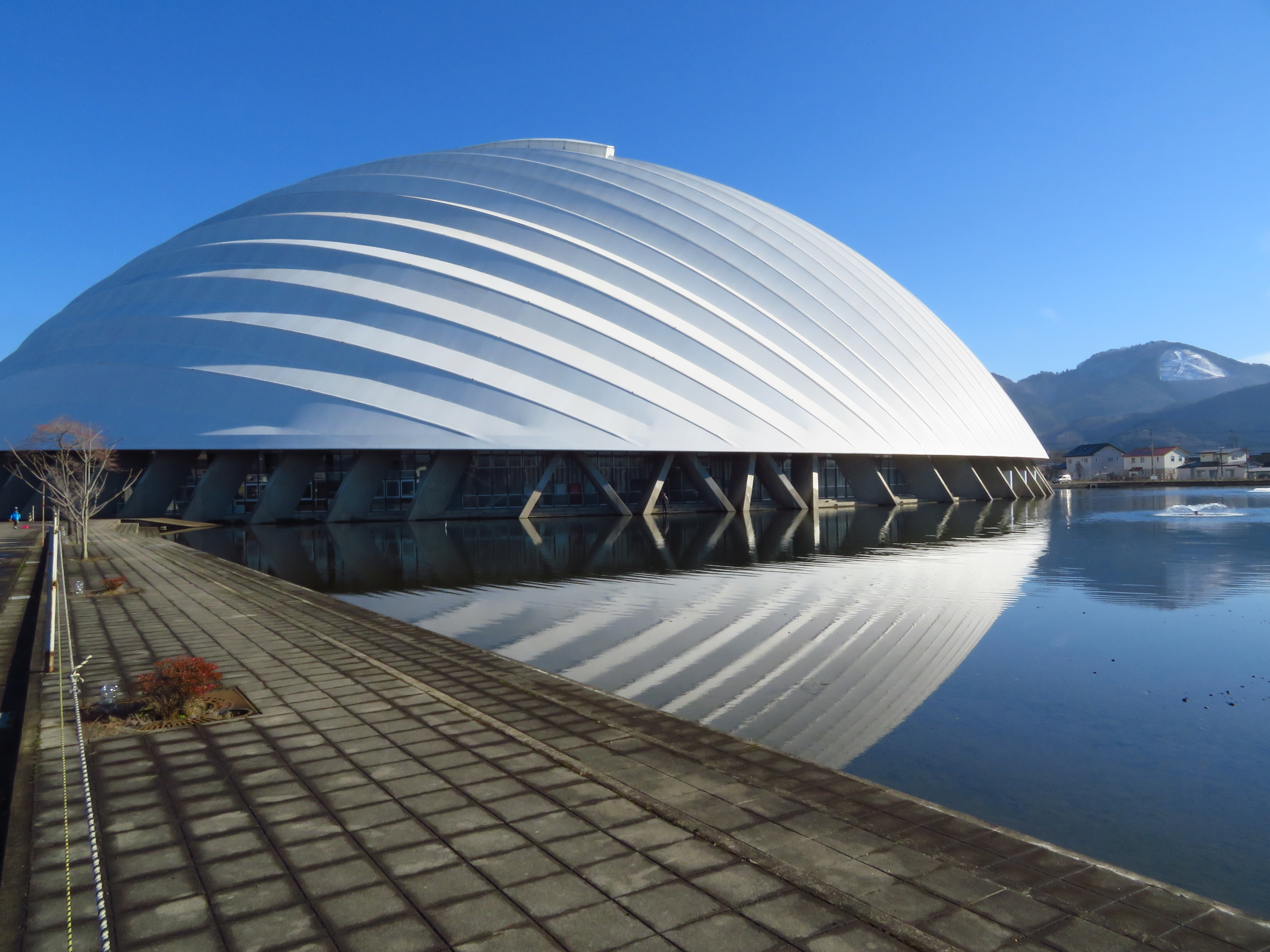
- The Ōdate Jukai Dome

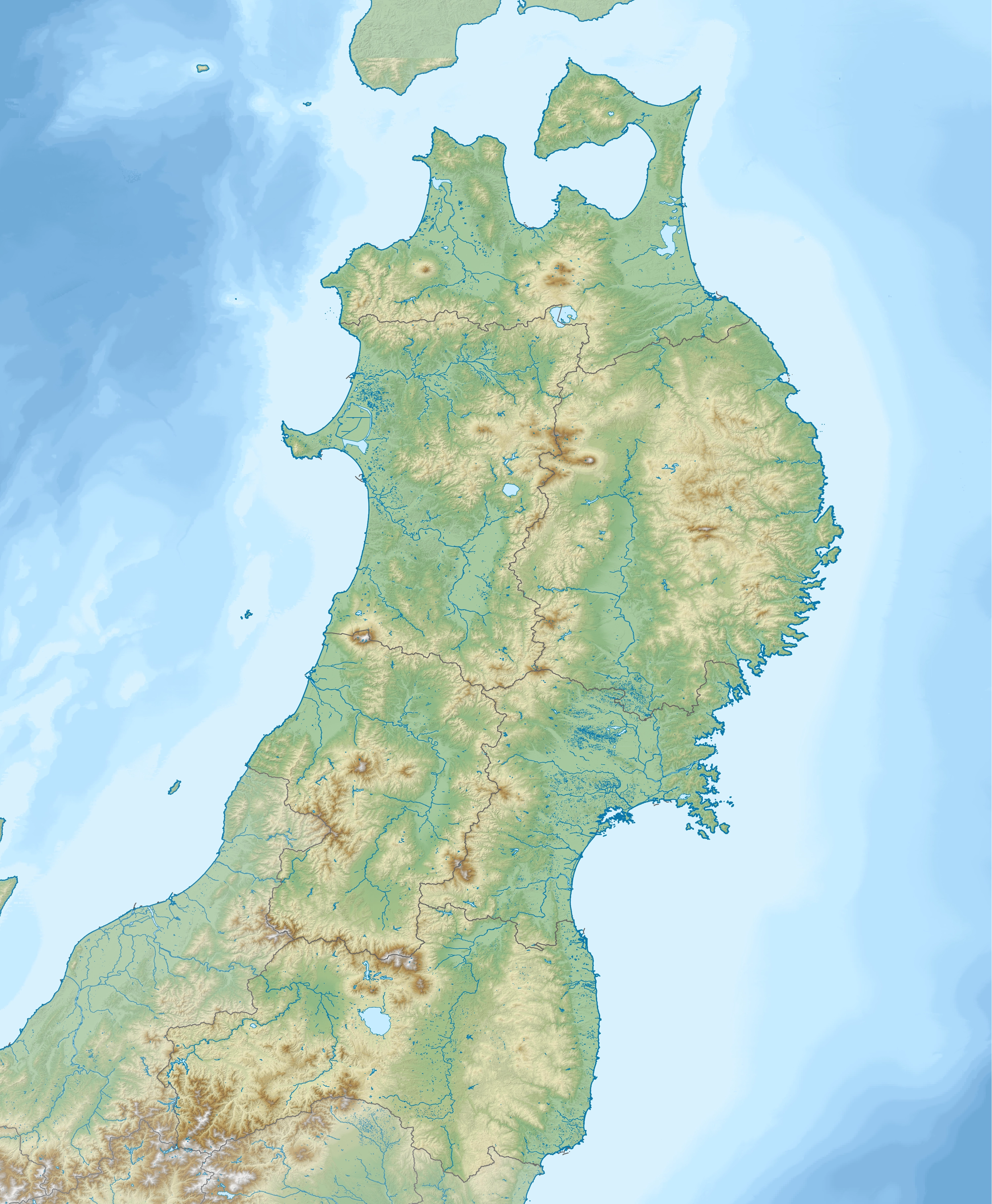
- Location within Akita Prefecture Location within Tohoku Region Location within Japan
- Full name: Ōdate Jukai Dome
- Location: Odate, Akita, Japan
- Coordinates: 40°17′32.7″N 140°35′12.7″E
- Owner: Akita Prefecture
- Operator: Nipro Odate Factory
- Capacity: Concert: 15,000; Baseball: 5,040
- Surface: Artificial turf
- Public transit: Ōdate Station
- Parking: 1,060 spaces

Construction
- Opened: June 1997
- Architect: Toyo Ito
- General contractor: Takenaka Corporation

The Nipro Hachiko Dome (ニプロハチ公ドーム, Nipuro Hachikou Dōmu) is a large wooden stadium in Ōdate, Akita, in northern Japan. The stadium covers an area of 12,915 m^{2}. It was completed in June 1997 and is made from 25,000 Akita cypress trees which are covered with a special double Teflon-coated membrane. This allows enough sunlight into the stadium so that during the day no artificial lights are needed. The stadium is principally used for baseball games, but thanks in part to its removable grandstands, the stadium can also be used for other sports and events. Nipro, a Japanese medical equipment manufacturing company, purchased the naming rights to the dome in 2017.

== Structure ==
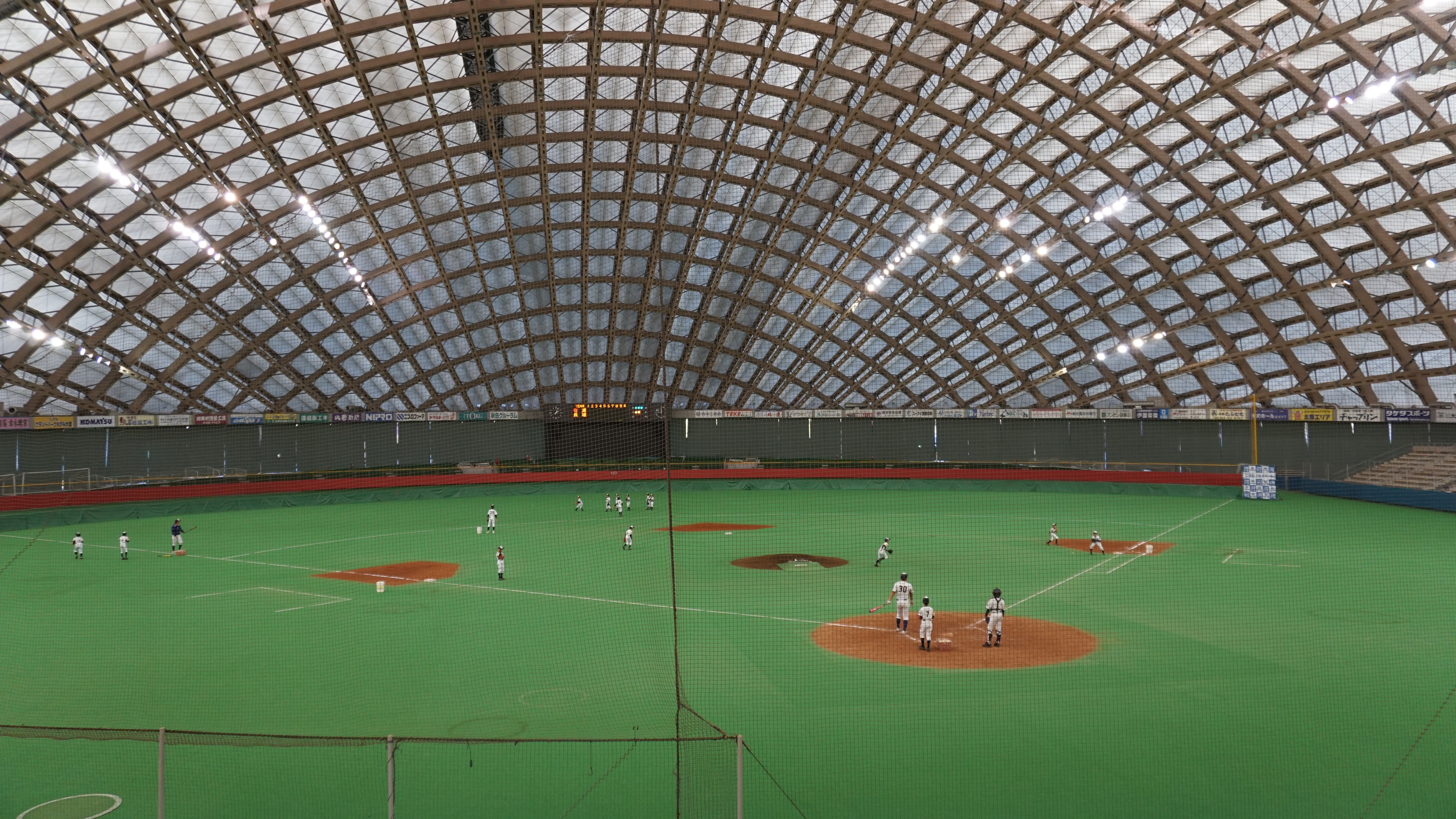
Interior view

The roof was made from 25,000 Akita cypress trees which were aged over the course of 60 years. This wooden framework is covered with a special double Teflon-coated membrane made from translucent fluorethylene resin-coated fibreglass. This membrane is very strong and light. The stadium is located in a region of Japan that it subjected to heavy snowfall of 2 to 3 m (6.6 to 9.8 ft). Because of this, the dome itself also has an aerodynamic design to resist strong winds and heavy snowfall. Buildup of snow on the roof is prevented by circulating warm air between the two Teflon-coated membranes; this shakes off the snow and allows the stadium to be used in all weather.

== Statistics ==
- Area: 12,915 m^{2}
- Total floor area: 24,672 m^{2}
- Height: 52 m (171 ft)
- Ceiling clearance: 46.2 m (152 ft)

== Entertainment events ==
- B'z – July 20, 1999
- TRF – August 15, 1998
- Kinki Kids – August 9–10, 2000
- SMAP – July 24, 1999, November 3, 2000
- Morning Musume – November 24, 2002

== Sports events ==
- USA VS Japan Collegiate All-Star Series – June 27, 2001
- Master League baseball games

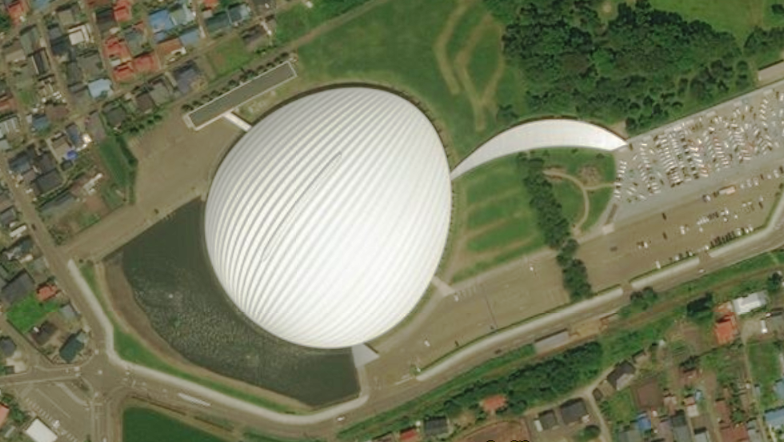
Satellite view
