= Ōgita Station =

Railway station in Ōdate, Akita Prefecture, Japan

Ōgita Station 扇田駅
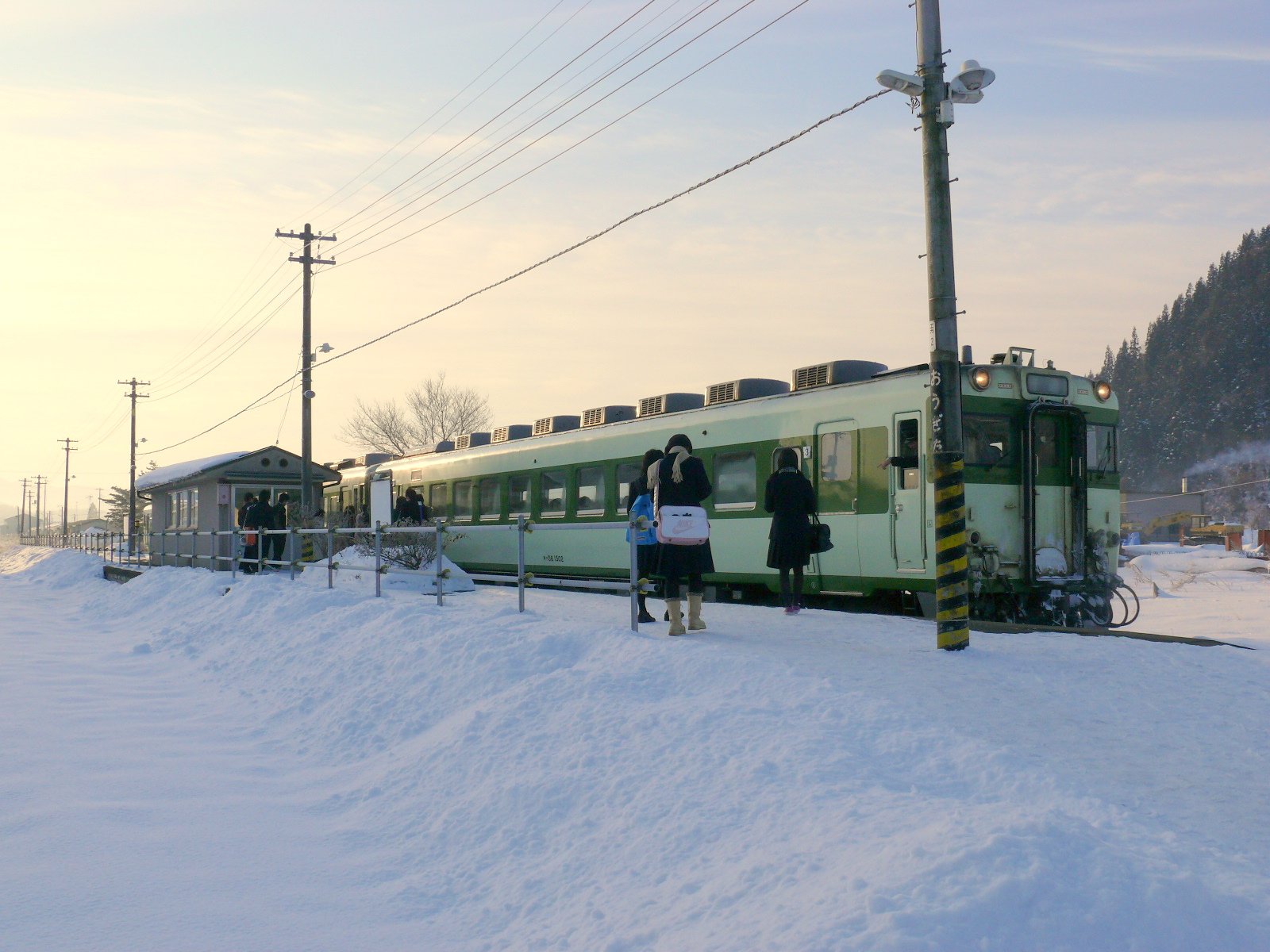
- Ōgita Station

General information
- Location: 12 Kaminakajima, Hinaimachi-Ōgita, Ōdate-shi, Akita-ken 018-5701; Japan
- Coordinates: 40°13′46.81″N 140°34′20.74″E
- Operator: JR East
- Line: ■ Hanawa Line
- Distance: 98.6 kilometers from Kōma
- Platforms: 1 side platform

Other information
- Status: Unstaffed
- Website: Official website

History
- Opened: July 1, 1914

Passengers
- FY2001: 103

Services
Preceding station	JR East	Following station
Higashi-Ōdate towards Ōdate	Hanawa Line	Ōtaki-Onsen towards Morioka
Location
- Location within Akita Prefecture Location within Japan

Ōgita Station (扇田駅, Ōgita-eki) is a railway station located in the city of Ōdate, Akita Prefecture, Japan, operated by the East Japan Railway Company (JR East).

== Lines ==
Ōgita Station is served by the Hanawa Line, and is located 98.6 km from the terminus of the line at Kōma.

== Station layout ==
The station was built with an island platform, but only one side of the platform is in use, thus making the station a single side platform serving bi-directional traffic. The station is unattended.

== History ==
Ōgita Station was opened on July 1, 1914 on the privately owned Akita Railways, serving the town of Ōgita, Akita. The line was nationalized on June 1, 1934, becoming part of the Japanese Government Railways (JGR) system, which became the Japan National Railways (JNR) after World War II. The station was absorbed into the JR East network upon the privatization of the JNR on April 1, 1987. The station has been unattended since April 2003.

== Passenger statistics ==
In fiscal 2001, the station was used by an average of 103 passengers daily (boarding passengers only).

== Surrounding area ==
- National Route 285 Bypass

== See also ==
- List of railway stations in Japan
