= Kazuno =

Kazuno 鹿角市
- City
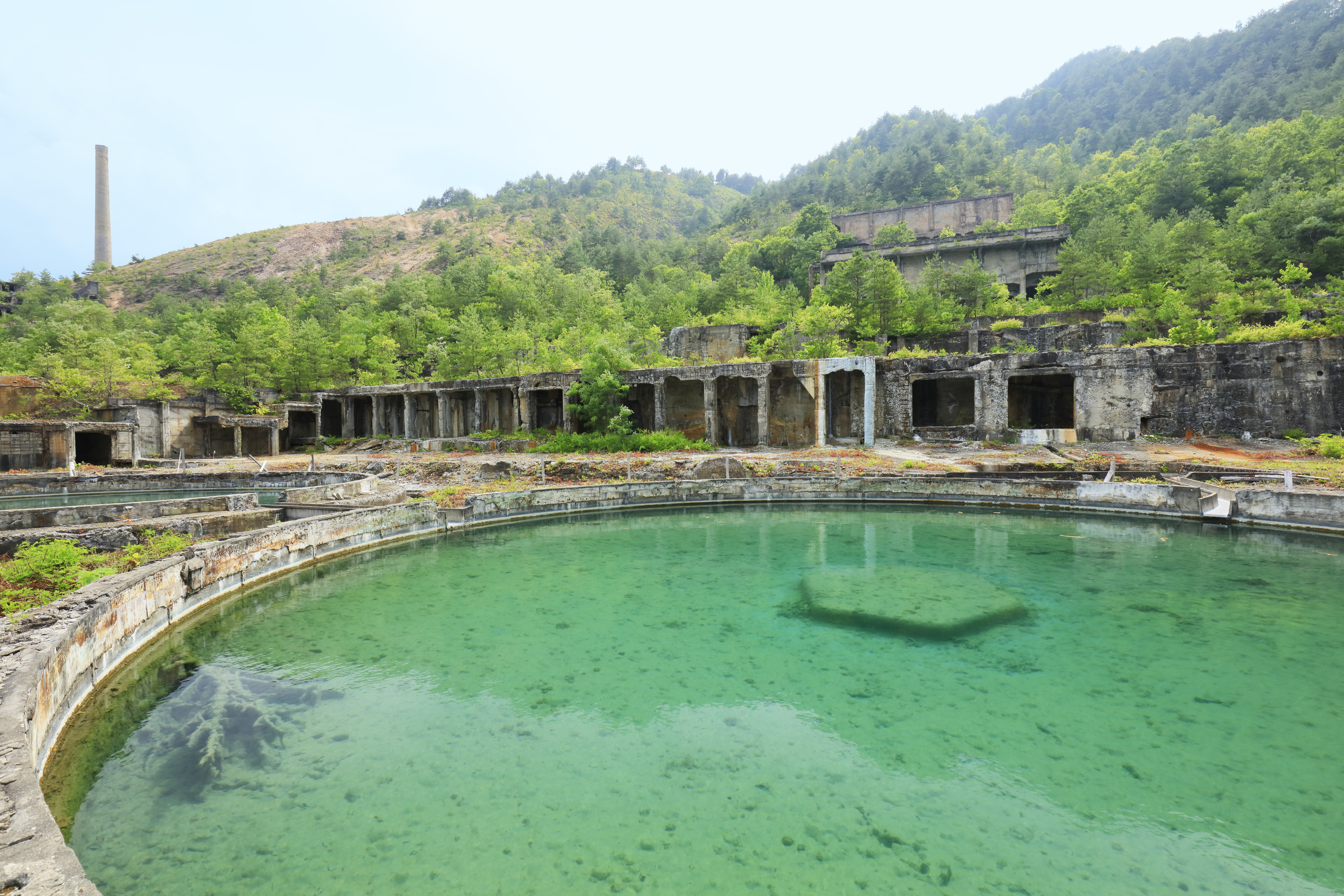

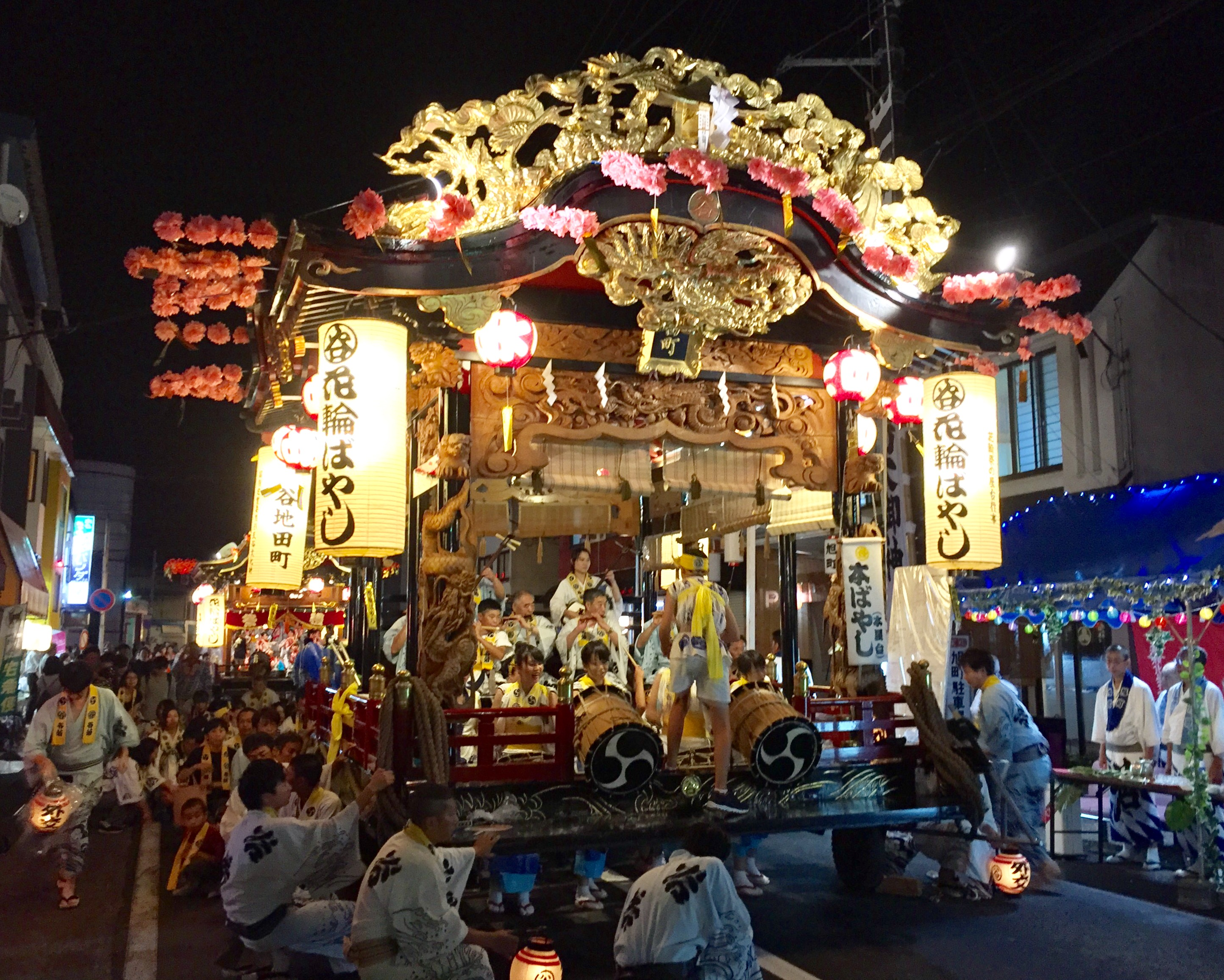

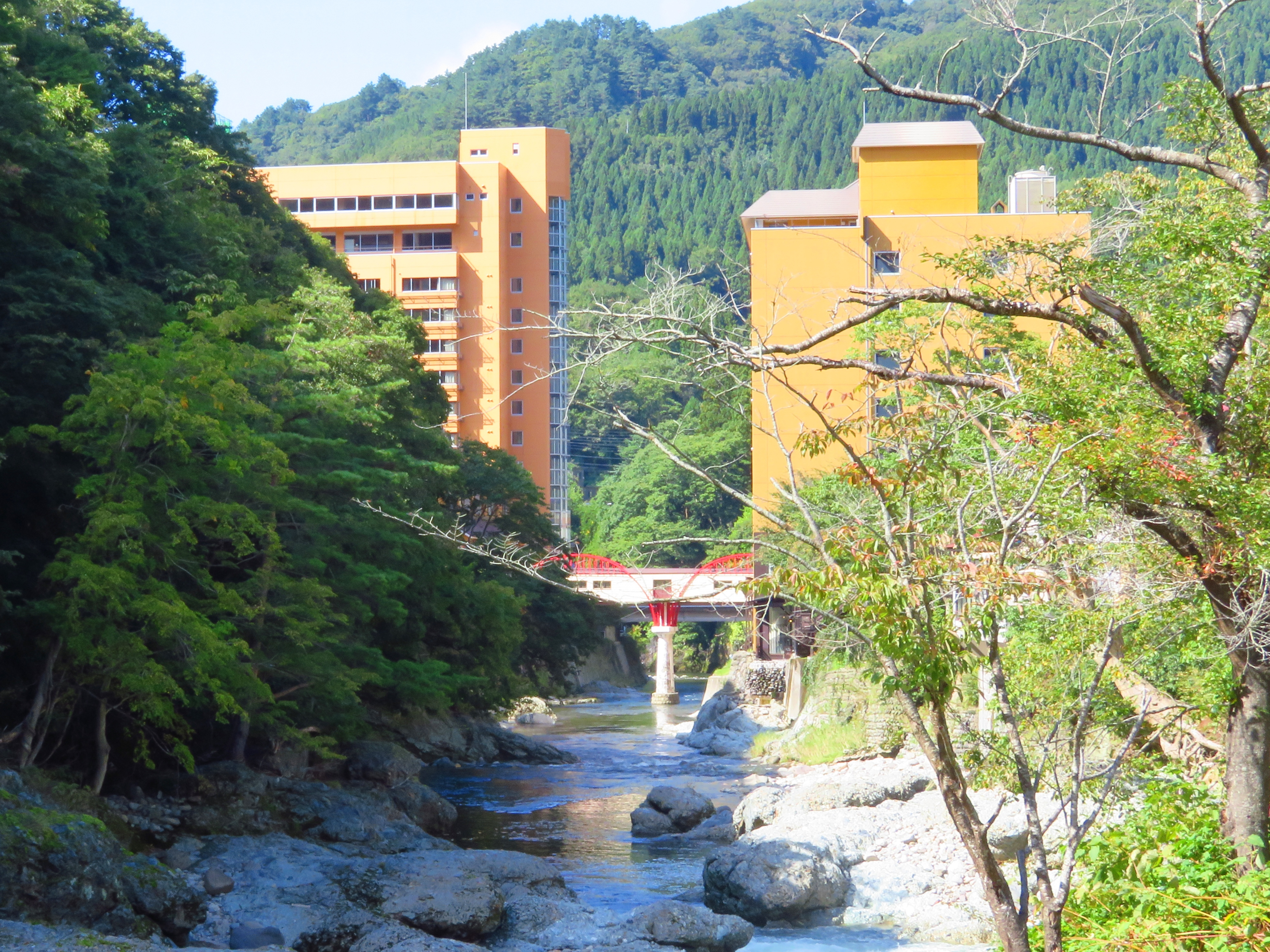

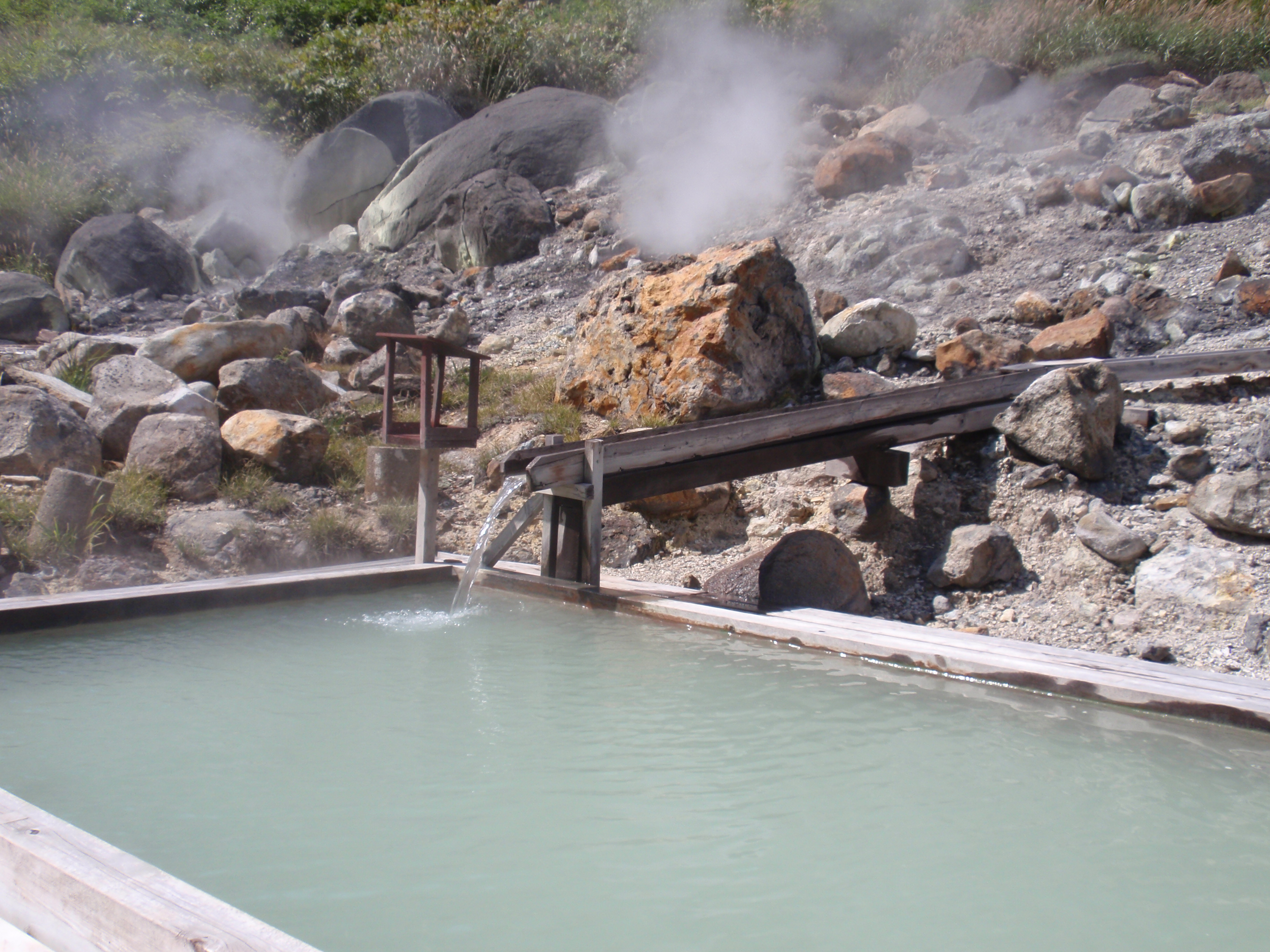

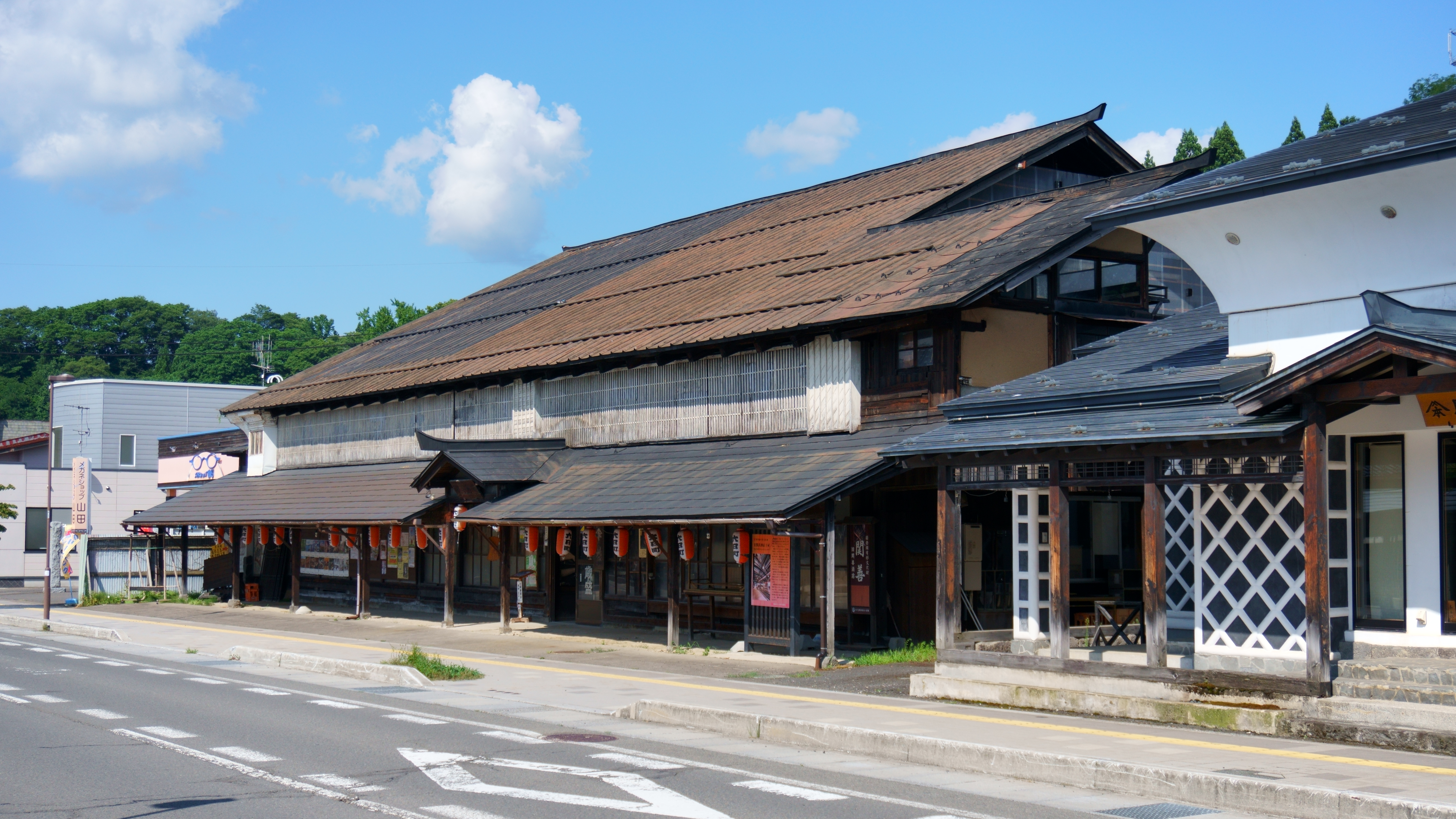

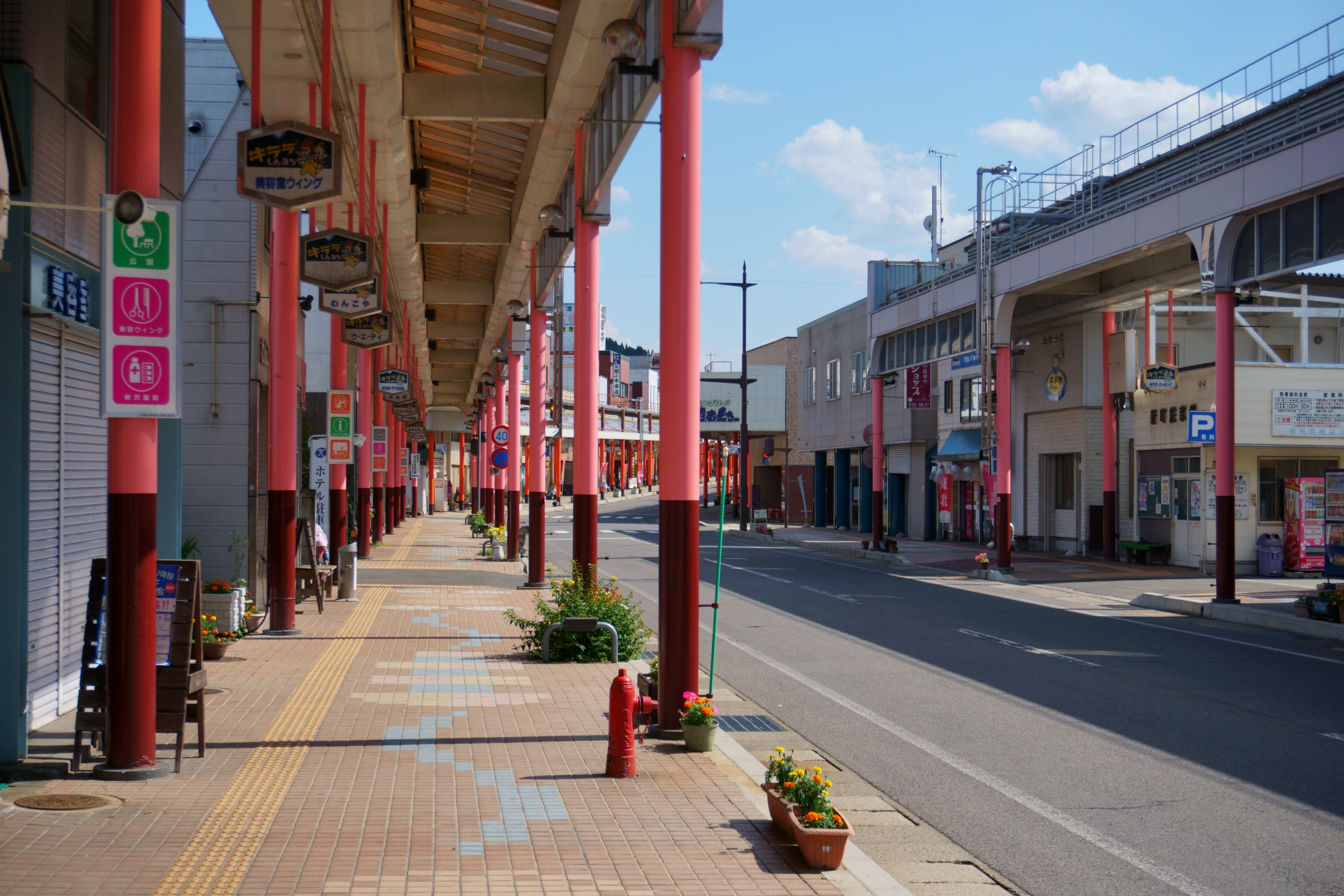
Former Osarizawa Mine	Hanawa Bayashi
Yuze Onsen	Fukenoyu Onsen
Old Sekizen Liquor Store	Central Hanawa
- Flag Seal
- Interactive map of Kazuno
- Coordinates: 40°12′56.8″N 140°47′18.16″E
- Country: Japan
- Region: Tōhoku
- Prefecture: Akita

Government
  - -Mayor: Atsushi Seki (since July 2021)

Area
  - Total: 707.52 km^{2} (273.17 sq mi)

Population (February 28, 2023)
  - Total: 28,329
  - Density: 40.040/km^{2} (103.70/sq mi)
- Time zone: UTC+9 (Japan Standard Time)
- Phone number: 0186-30-1111
- Address: 4-1 Arata, Hanawa, Kazuno-shi, Akita-ken 018-5292
- Climate: Dfa
- Website: Official website
- Symbols
- Bird: Rooster
- Flower: Sakura
- Tree: Rowan

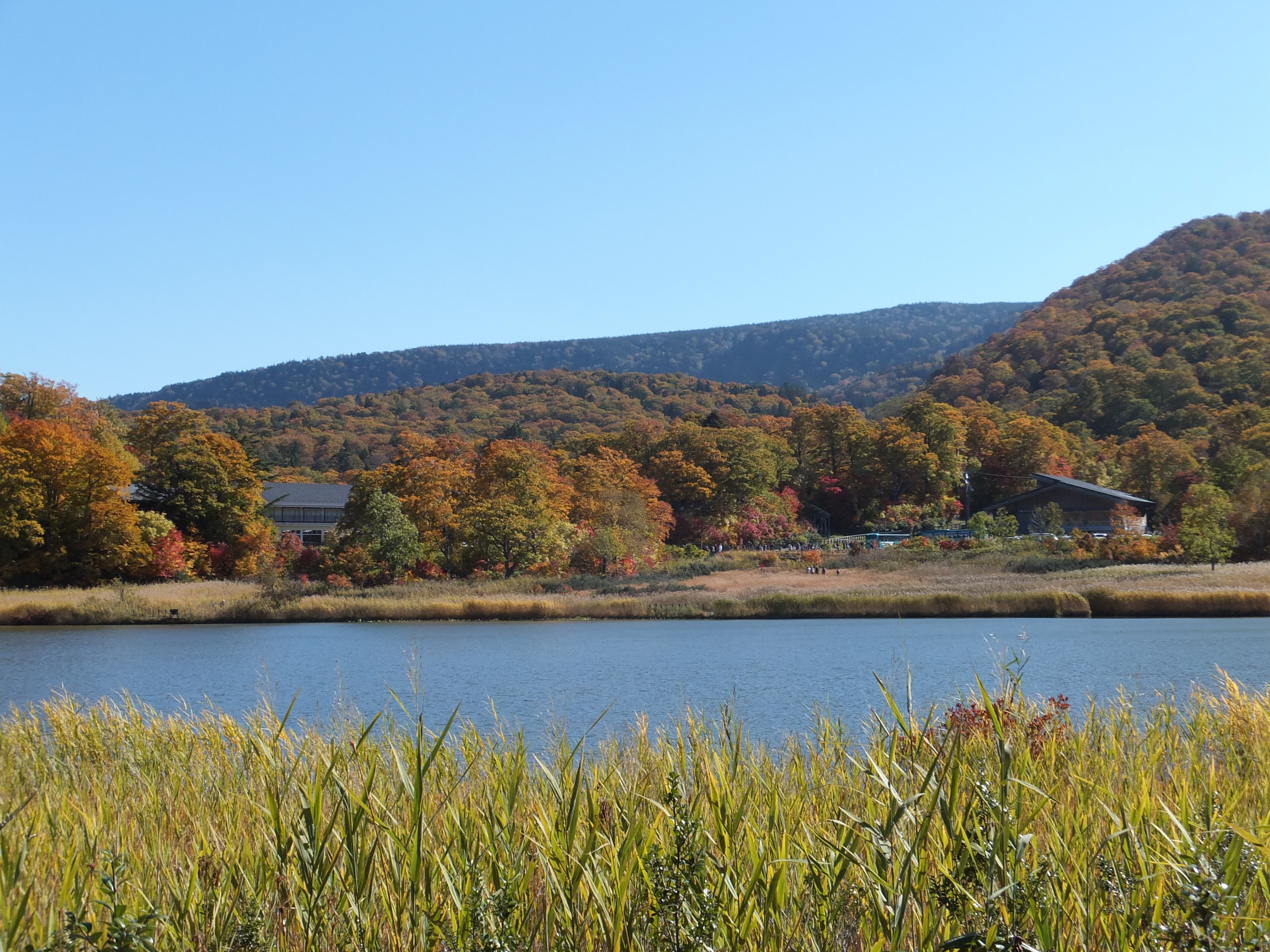
Hachimantai Ōnuma in Kazuno

Kazuno (鹿角市, Kazuno-shi; Japanese pronunciation: [ka.(d)zɯ.no, kaꜜ.(d)zɯ.no, ka.(d)zɯ.noꜜ.ɕi]) is a city located in Akita Prefecture, Japan. As of 28 March 2023, the city had an estimated population of 28,329 in 12,570 households, and a population density of 40 persons per km^{2}. The total area of the city is 707.52 square kilometres (273.17 square miles).

== Geography ==
Kazuno is located in the far northeast corner of Akita Prefecture. The urban center is located in the Hanawa Basin, which is part of the basin of the Yoneshiro River. Outside the Hanawa Basin, it is mountainous and heavily forested, with numerous rivers and waterfalls with the Ōu Mountains and Iwate Prefecture on the east. The area has many hot springs. Much of the city is within the borders of the Towada-Hachimantai National Park, although the city does not border on Lake Towada self. Due to its inland location, the difference between the annual maximum temperature and the annual minimum temperature is very large and the city is noted for its heavy snowfall in winter.

=== Neighboring municipalities ===
Akita Prefecture

- Kitaakita
- Kosaka
- Ōdate
- Semboku

Aomori Prefecture

- Sannohe
- Shingō
- Takko
- Towada

Iwate Prefecture

- Hachimantai

== Climate ==
Kazuno has a humid continental climate (Köppen climate classification Dfa) with large seasonal temperature differences, with warm to hot (and often humid) summers and cold (sometimes severely cold) winters with heavy snowfalls. The average annual temperature in Kazuno is 9.5 °C (49.1 °F). The average annual rainfall is 1,454.1 mm (57.25 in) with July as the wettest month. The temperatures are highest on average in August, at around 22.8 °C (73.0 °F), and lowest in January, at around −2.9 °C (26.8 °F).

Climate data for Kazuno (elevation 123 m, 1991–2020 normals, extremes 1976–present)
Month	Jan	Feb	Mar	Apr	May	Jun	Jul	Aug	Sep	Oct	Nov	Dec	Year
Record high °C (°F)	11.1 (52.0)	18.4 (65.1)	22.5 (72.5)	29.5 (85.1)	32.3 (90.1)	33.5 (92.3)	37.0 (98.6)	36.9 (98.4)	34.4 (93.9)	27.3 (81.1)	23.1 (73.6)	17.3 (63.1)	37.0 (98.6)
Mean daily maximum °C (°F)	0.6 (33.1)	1.7 (35.1)	5.8 (42.4)	13.6 (56.5)	19.9 (67.8)	23.8 (74.8)	26.8 (80.2)	28.1 (82.6)	24.0 (75.2)	17.4 (63.3)	10.1 (50.2)	3.0 (37.4)	14.6 (58.3)
Daily mean °C (°F)	−2.9 (26.8)	−2.3 (27.9)	1.0 (33.8)	7.4 (45.3)	13.8 (56.8)	18.3 (64.9)	21.9 (71.4)	22.8 (73.0)	18.3 (64.9)	11.4 (52.5)	5.0 (41.0)	−0.5 (31.1)	9.5 (49.1)
Mean daily minimum °C (°F)	−7.1 (19.2)	−6.9 (19.6)	−3.7 (25.3)	1.6 (34.9)	8.0 (46.4)	13.4 (56.1)	17.9 (64.2)	18.5 (65.3)	13.6 (56.5)	6.3 (43.3)	0.7 (33.3)	−4.1 (24.6)	4.8 (40.6)
Record low °C (°F)	−22.4 (−8.3)	−19.7 (−3.5)	−16.8 (1.8)	−9.9 (14.2)	−1.8 (28.8)	3.2 (37.8)	8.1 (46.6)	8.6 (47.5)	1.4 (34.5)	−2.9 (26.8)	−11.4 (11.5)	−16.6 (2.1)	−22.4 (−8.3)
Average precipitation mm (inches)	79.4 (3.13)	68.7 (2.70)	84.1 (3.31)	89.2 (3.51)	93.1 (3.67)	108.3 (4.26)	200.6 (7.90)	190.4 (7.50)	149.3 (5.88)	138.8 (5.46)	136.0 (5.35)	116.3 (4.58)	1,454.1 (57.25)
Average snowfall cm (inches)	182 (72)	150 (59)	100 (39)	2 (0.8)	0 (0)	0 (0)	0 (0)	0 (0)	0 (0)	0 (0)	13 (5.1)	132 (52)	579 (228)
Average precipitation days (≥ 1.0 mm)	17.8	15.9	14.8	13.0	12.0	10.1	12.3	11.4	12.1	13.9	16.9	19.1	169.2
Mean monthly sunshine hours	52.2	72.0	118.5	158.4	185.3	174.0	147.0	168.2	146.7	132.9	87.6	52.8	1,495.6
Source: Japan Meteorological Agency (1991–2020 normals, extremes 1976–present)

Climate data for Yuze, Kazuno (elevation 214 m, 1991–2020 normals, extremes 1976–present)
Month	Jan	Feb	Mar	Apr	May	Jun	Jul	Aug	Sep	Oct	Nov	Dec	Year
Record high °C (°F)	11.1 (52.0)	17.4 (63.3)	20.3 (68.5)	31.3 (88.3)	31.6 (88.9)	33.4 (92.1)	36.0 (96.8)	35.8 (96.4)	33.8 (92.8)	27.3 (81.1)	22.8 (73.0)	15.8 (60.4)	36.0 (96.8)
Mean daily maximum °C (°F)	0.3 (32.5)	1.5 (34.7)	5.6 (42.1)	13.4 (56.1)	20.0 (68.0)	23.6 (74.5)	26.5 (79.7)	27.6 (81.7)	23.3 (73.9)	16.8 (62.2)	9.7 (49.5)	2.7 (36.9)	14.3 (57.7)
Daily mean °C (°F)	−2.5 (27.5)	−2.0 (28.4)	1.1 (34.0)	7.0 (44.6)	13.4 (56.1)	17.6 (63.7)	21.4 (70.5)	22.3 (72.1)	17.8 (64.0)	11.2 (52.2)	5.1 (41.2)	−0.3 (31.5)	9.3 (48.7)
Mean daily minimum °C (°F)	−5.6 (21.9)	−5.4 (22.3)	−2.8 (27.0)	1.7 (35.1)	7.5 (45.5)	12.8 (55.0)	17.5 (63.5)	18.3 (64.9)	13.7 (56.7)	6.8 (44.2)	1.3 (34.3)	−3.2 (26.2)	5.2 (41.4)
Record low °C (°F)	−18.7 (−1.7)	−17.2 (1.0)	−15.7 (3.7)	−9.8 (14.4)	−1.1 (30.0)	3.2 (37.8)	7.8 (46.0)	8.1 (46.6)	1.6 (34.9)	−1.8 (28.8)	−9.5 (14.9)	−15.1 (4.8)	−18.7 (−1.7)
Average precipitation mm (inches)	89.1 (3.51)	77.5 (3.05)	93.0 (3.66)	87.2 (3.43)	98.1 (3.86)	112.6 (4.43)	188.4 (7.42)	175.8 (6.92)	165.9 (6.53)	143.1 (5.63)	139.7 (5.50)	125.1 (4.93)	1,509 (59.41)
Average precipitation days (≥ 1.0 mm)	18.6	16.5	16.2	13.2	12.0	10.8	12.8	12.4	13.1	14.6	17.1	19.6	177.1
Mean monthly sunshine hours	27.1	45.9	92.8	155.3	190.8	157.2	127.3	149.3	130.5	116.8	73.3	39.8	1,305.9
Source: Japan Meteorological Agency (1991–2020 normals, extremes 1976–present)

Climate data for Hachimantai, Kazuno (elevation 578 m, 1991–2020 normals, extremes 1978–present)
Month	Jan	Feb	Mar	Apr	May	Jun	Jul	Aug	Sep	Oct	Nov	Dec	Year
Record high °C (°F)	8.2 (46.8)	14.8 (58.6)	16.4 (61.5)	27.2 (81.0)	29.7 (85.5)	30.5 (86.9)	32.6 (90.7)	32.9 (91.2)	30.8 (87.4)	25.3 (77.5)	20.2 (68.4)	14.3 (57.7)	32.9 (91.2)
Mean daily maximum °C (°F)	−2.0 (28.4)	−1.1 (30.0)	2.8 (37.0)	9.6 (49.3)	17.1 (62.8)	20.9 (69.6)	23.8 (74.8)	25.0 (77.0)	20.8 (69.4)	14.5 (58.1)	7.4 (45.3)	0.7 (33.3)	11.6 (52.9)
Daily mean °C (°F)	−4.7 (23.5)	−4.2 (24.4)	−0.9 (30.4)	4.8 (40.6)	11.2 (52.2)	15.5 (59.9)	19.3 (66.7)	20.1 (68.2)	15.8 (60.4)	9.5 (49.1)	3.4 (38.1)	−2.2 (28.0)	7.3 (45.1)
Mean daily minimum °C (°F)	−7.8 (18.0)	−7.6 (18.3)	−4.8 (23.4)	0.4 (32.7)	5.8 (42.4)	10.5 (50.9)	15.4 (59.7)	16.1 (61.0)	11.6 (52.9)	5.1 (41.2)	−0.2 (31.6)	−5.2 (22.6)	3.3 (37.9)
Record low °C (°F)	−16.6 (2.1)	−17.0 (1.4)	−14.8 (5.4)	−9.0 (15.8)	−2.2 (28.0)	0.8 (33.4)	4.9 (40.8)	7.1 (44.8)	0.2 (32.4)	−2.3 (27.9)	−9.6 (14.7)	−14.2 (6.4)	−17.0 (1.4)
Average precipitation mm (inches)	169.0 (6.65)	133.5 (5.26)	146.1 (5.75)	128.9 (5.07)	123.2 (4.85)	129.5 (5.10)	230.4 (9.07)	230.9 (9.09)	200.9 (7.91)	211.8 (8.34)	229.4 (9.03)	221.8 (8.73)	2,155.4 (84.86)
Average precipitation days (≥ 1.0 mm)	23.4	20.0	18.8	14.2	13.1	11.1	13.4	13.1	13.9	16.0	19.7	22.9	199.5
Mean monthly sunshine hours	19.6	38.7	88.9	162.6	202.1	178.7	138.1	159.3	134.4	120.5	68.4	27.3	1,338.4
Source: Japan Meteorological Agency (1991–2020 normals, extremes 1978–present)

== Demographics ==
Per Japanese census data, the population of Kazuno has declined over the past 60 years.

Historical population
Year	Pop.	±%
1960	59,593	—
1970	50,346	−15.5%
1980	45,615	−9.4%
1990	42,407	−7.0%
2000	39,144	−7.7%
2010	34,473	−11.9%
2020	29,088	−15.6%

== History ==
The area of present-day Kazuno was settled in prehistoric times, and contains major Jōmon period archaeological sites and numerous burial mounds from the Kofun period. The area was part of ancient Mutsu Province and was ruled by the Nambu clan of Morioka Domain during the Edo period. After the start of the Meiji period, the area became briefly part of Rikuchū Province before being transferred to Akita Prefecture in 1871. It was organized as part of Kazuno District, Akita Prefecture in 1878 with the establishment of the modern municipalities system.

The city of Kazuno was founded on April 1, 1972 by the merger of the towns of Hanawa, Towada, and Osarizawa and the village of Hachimantai.

== Government ==
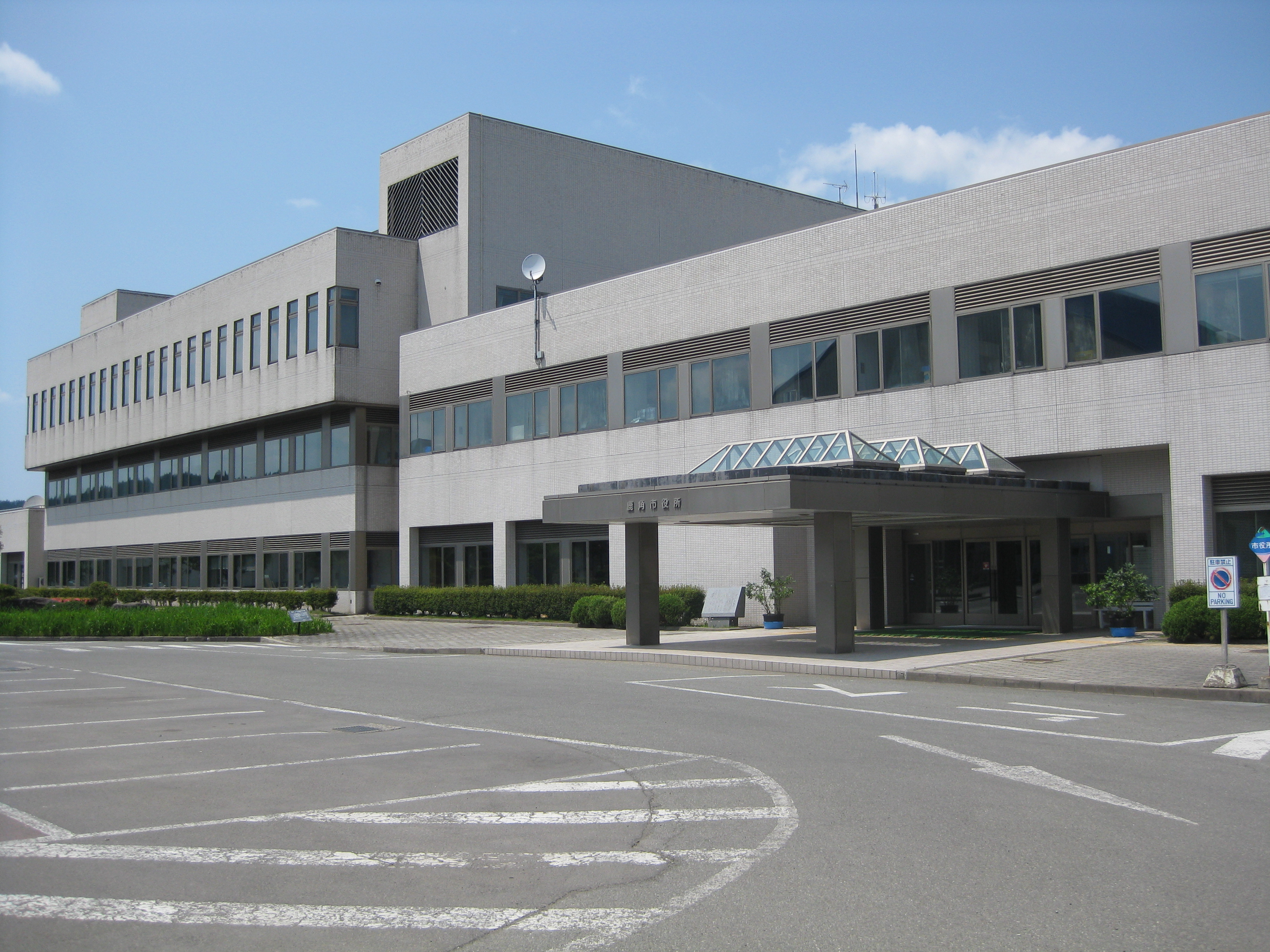
Kazuno City Hall

Kazuno has a mayor-council form of government with a directly elected mayor and a unicameral city legislature of 18 members. The city contributes two members to the Akita Prefectural Assembly. In terms of national politics, the city is part of Akita 2nd district 2 of the lower house of the Diet of Japan.

== Economy ==
The economy of Kazuno is based on agriculture, forestry and seasonal tourism. Kazuo is the main production area in Akita Prefecture for apples, pears, cherries, peaches, blueberries, quince, and prunes. Although Kazuno is located in a mountainous area, it has also cultivated rice.

== Education ==
Kazuno has six public elementary schools and four public middle schools operated by the city government and two public high schools operated by the Akita Prefectural Board of Education. Akita Prefecture also operates one special education school for the handicapped.

== Transportation ==
=== Railway ===
East Japan Railway Company - Hanawa Line

- Yuze-Onsen - Hachimantai - Rikuchū-Ōsato - Kazuno-Hanawa - Shibahira - Towada-Minami - Suehiro - Dobukai

=== Highway ===
- Tōhoku Expressway
- National Route 103
- National Route 104
- National Route 282
- National Route 285
- National Route 341
- National Route 454

== Local attractions ==
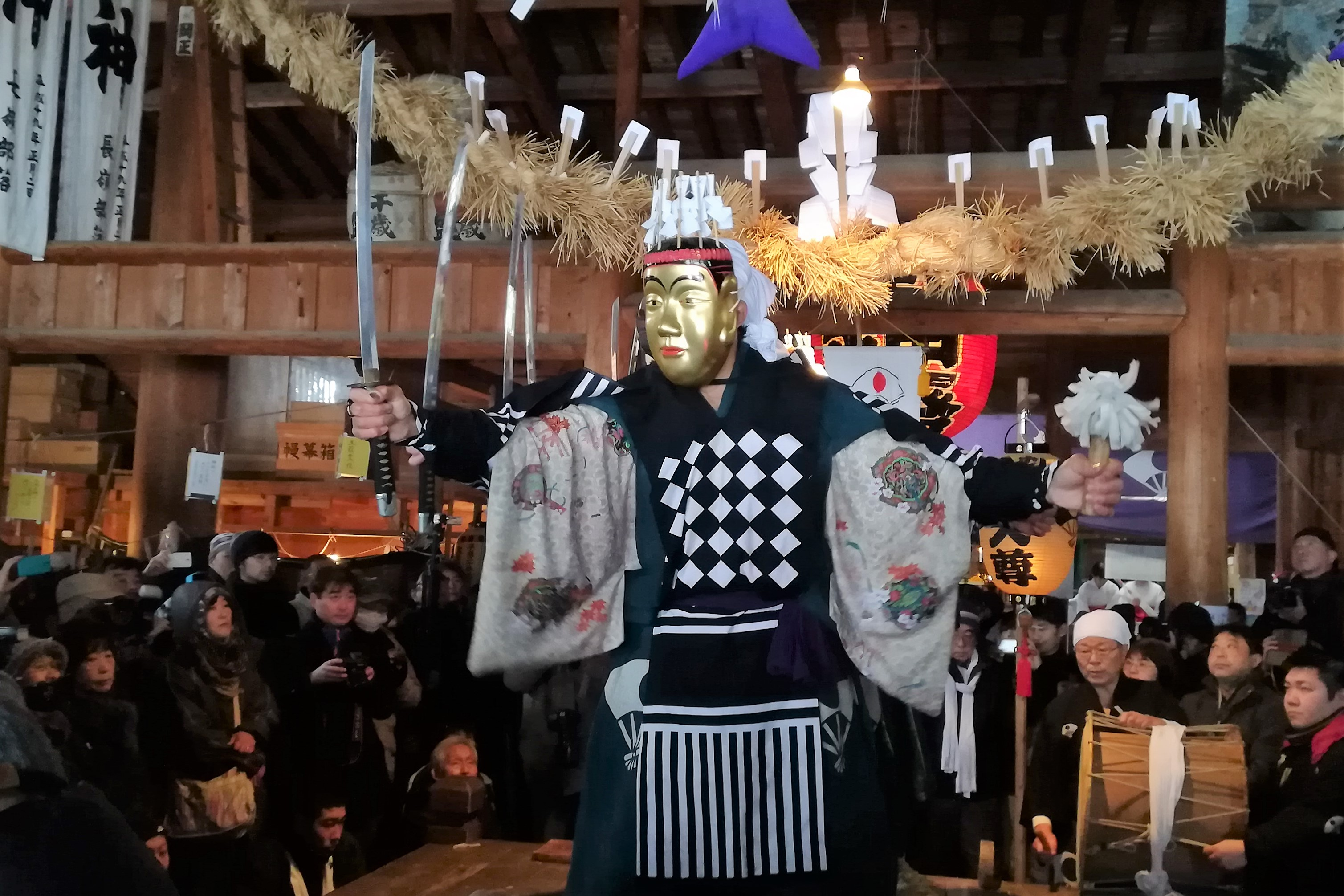
Dainichido Bugaku

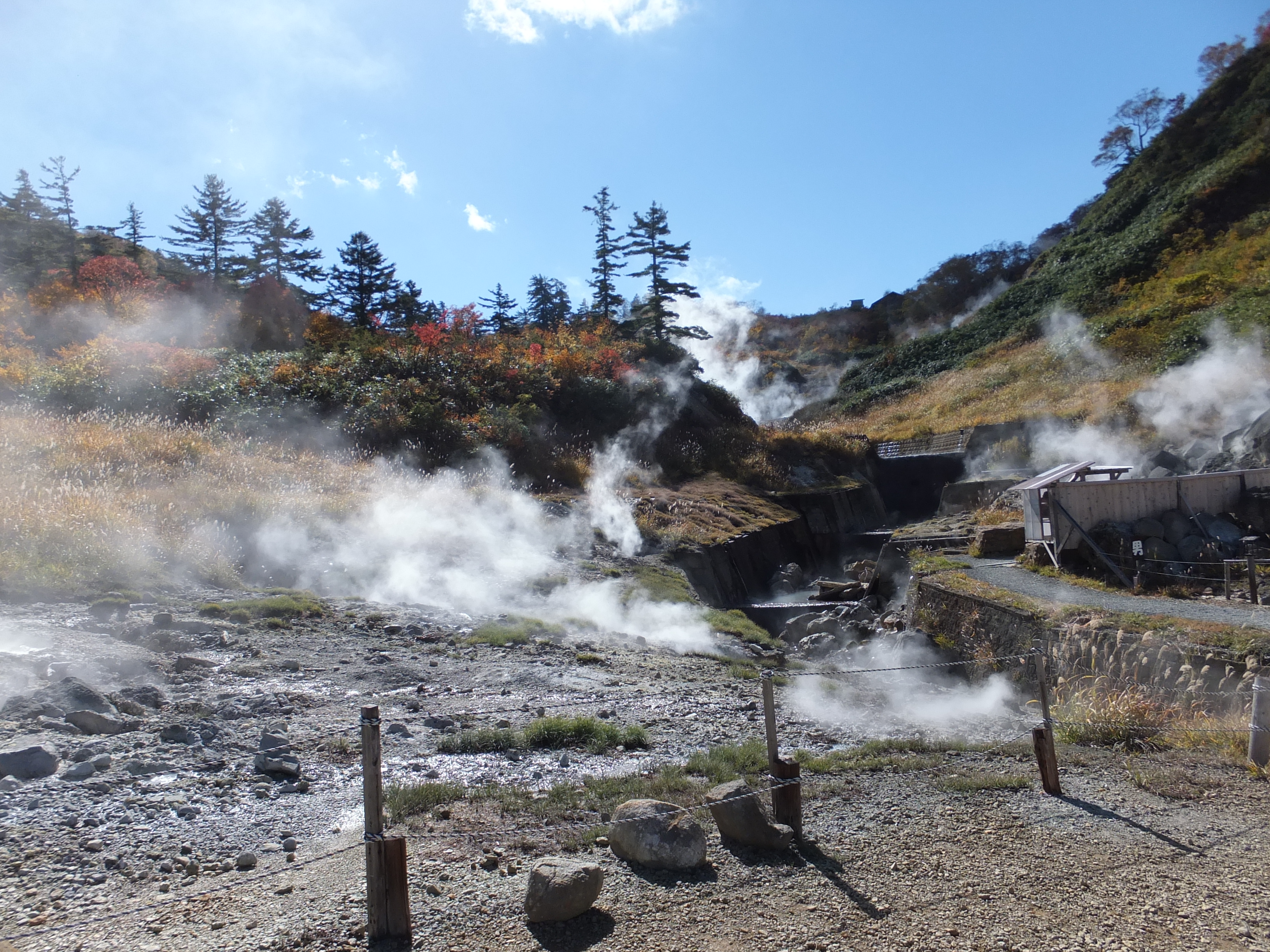
Goshogake Onsen

- Alpas Sports Park
- Chagama Falls – one of the Japan's Top 100 Waterfalls
- Dainichido Bugaku - Ritual dance and music held on January 2, UNESCO Intangible cultural heritage
- Hachimantai Onsen
- former Osarizawa Mine
- Ōyu Onsen
- Ōyu Stone Circles - Jōmon period archaeological site, Special National Historic Site of Japan
- Yuze Onsen

== International relations ==
Kazuno is twinned with:

- Sopron, Hungary (1995)
- Liangzhou, China since November 6, 2000

== Noted people from Kazuno ==
- Junko Asari, Olympic marathon runner
- Yuta Kimura, professional baseball player
- Takayuki Matsumiya, Olympic long-distance runner
- Yasuhiko Okudera, professional soccer player
- Kenichi Takahashi, Olympic long-distance runner
- Naitō Torajirō, historian
- Tomoefuji Toshihide, sumo wrestler

== Media ==
- Kazuno Kiritanpo FM
