= Chagama Falls =

Coordinates: 40°0′40″N 140°33′27″E

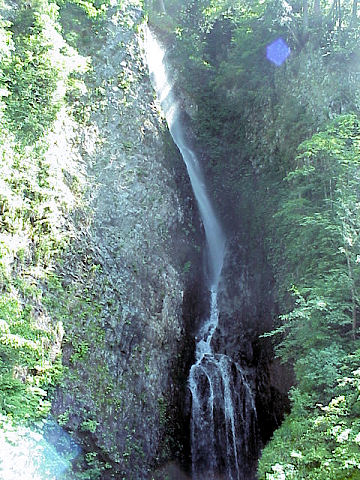

- Location within Akita Prefecture Location within Japan
- Location: Kazuno, Akita Prefecture, Japan
- Type: shute
- Total height: 100 m (330 ft)
- Number of drops: 1
- Watercourse: Yoneshiro River

Chagama Falls (茶釜の滝, Chagama-no-taki) is a waterfall in the Hachimantai district of Kazuno, Akita Prefecture, Japan, on the Yoakeshima branch of the Yoneshiro River. It is one of "Japan’s Top 100 Waterfalls", in a listing published by the Japanese Ministry of the Environment in 1990. The falls have a height of 100 metres (330 ft), making it one of the tallest on the list of 100 Waterfalls. The falls are also one of the most remotely located on the listing, requiring a hike of 5.5 kilometres (3.4 mi) across very rough terrain to reach.
