= Shibahira Station =

Railway station in Kazuno, Akita Prefecture, Japan

Shibahira Station 柴平駅
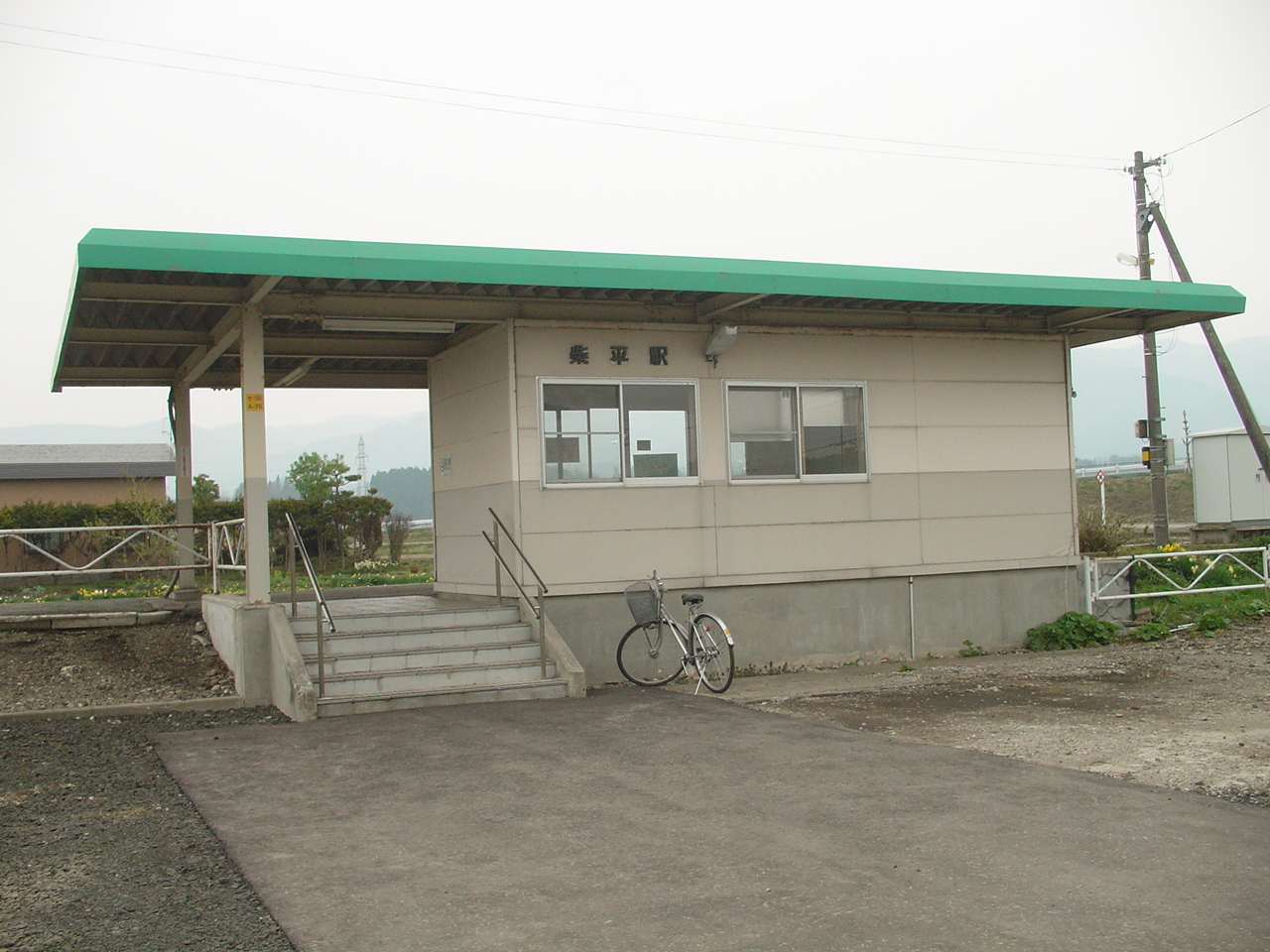
- Shibahira Station in May 2007

General information
- Location: Hanawa Sekinokuchi, Kazuno-shi, Akita-ken 018-5201; Japan
- Coordinates: 40°13′50.9″N 140°47′16.6″E
- Operator: JR East
- Line: ■ Hanawa Line
- Distance: 74.7 km from Kōma
- Platforms: 1 side platform
- Tracks: 1

Construction
- Structure type: At grade

Other information
- Status: Unstaffed
- Website: Official website

History
- Opened: November 10, 1923

Services
Preceding station	JR East	Following station
Towada-Minami towards Ōdate	Hanawa Line	Kazuno-Hanawa towards Morioka
Location
- Location within Akita Prefecture Location within Japan

Shibahira Station (柴平駅, Shibahira-eki) is a JR East railway station located in the city of Kazuno, Akita Prefecture, Japan.

== Lines ==
Shibahira Station is served by the Hanawa Line, and is located 74.7 rail kilometers from the terminus of the line at Kōma Station.

== Station layout ==
Shibahira Station consists of one side platform serving a single bi-directional track. The station is unattended.

== History ==
Shibahira Station was opened on November 10, 1923 as a station on the privately owned Akita Railways, serving the village of Shibahira, Akita. The line was nationalized on June 1, 1934, becoming part of the Japanese Government Railways (JGR) system. The JGR became the Japan National Railways (JNR) after World War II. The station has been unattended since October 1, 1971. The station was absorbed into the JR East network upon the privatization of the JNR on April 1, 1987.

== Surrounding area ==
- Kazuno City Hall
- National Route 282

== See also ==
- List of railway stations in Japan
