= Kazuno Kiritanpo FM =

Kazuno Kiritanpo FM (JOZZ2BH-FM)
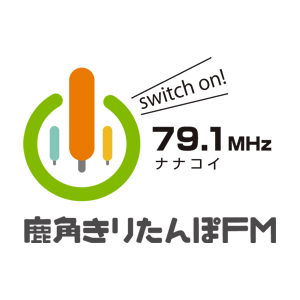

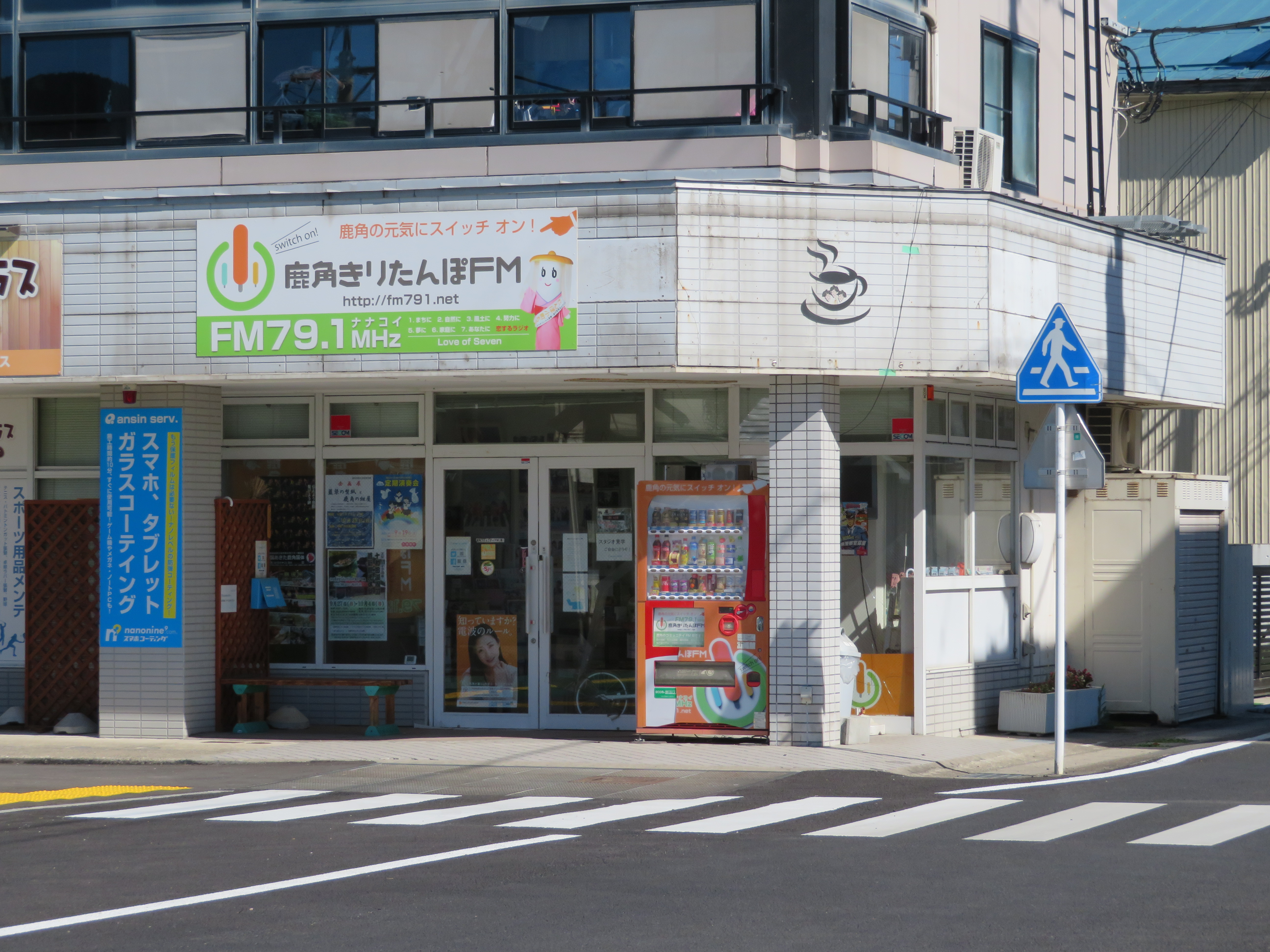

Kazuno, Akita; Japan
- Frequency: 79.1 MHz

Programming
- Language: Japanese
- Format: Music/Talk/News

History
- First air date: October 8, 2013

Technical information
- ERP: 38.2 watts
- HAAT: 189 metres
- Transmitter coordinates: 40°10′07.2″N 140°45′12.0″E

Links
- Webcast: http://csra.fm/blog/author/fm791/
- Website: Official website

Kazuno Community FM Co., Ltd. (鹿角コミュニティFM株式会社, Kazuno Komyuniti FM Kabushiki-gaisha) is a Japanese FM station based in Kazuno, Akita, Japan.
