= Suehiro Station =

Railway station in Kazuno, Akita Prefecture, Japan

Suehiro Station 末広駅
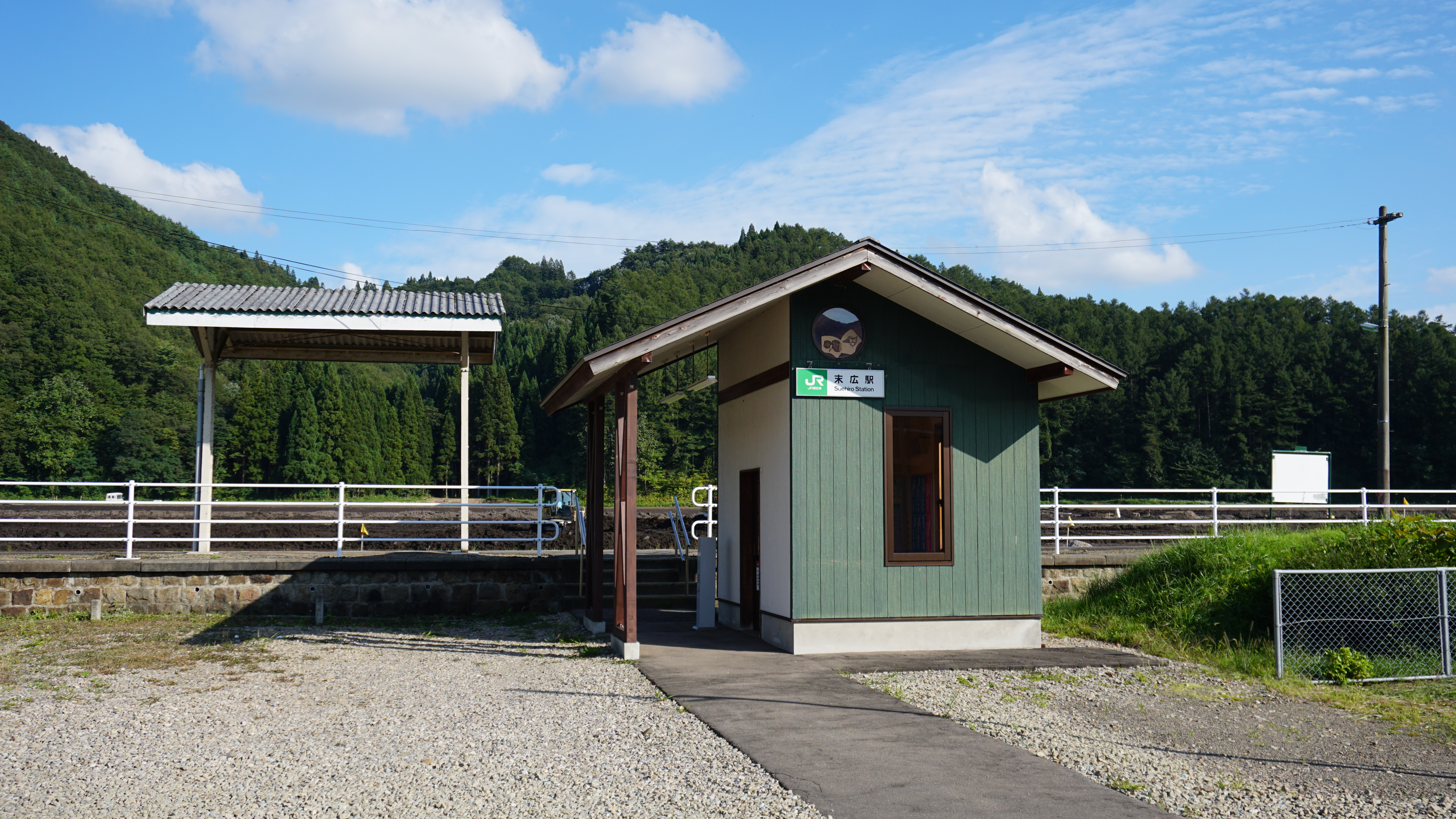
- Suehiro Station in September 2018

General information
- Location: Towada-Suehiro Mukaitai, Kazuno-shi, Akita-ken 018-5337; Japan
- Coordinates: 40°13′47.7″N 140°44′14″E
- Operator: JR East
- Line: ■ Hanawa Line
- Distance: 82.8 km from Kōma
- Platforms: 1 side platform
- Tracks: 1

Construction
- Structure type: At grade

Other information
- Status: Unstaffed
- Website: Official website

History
- Opened: December 25, 1915
- Former names: Kemanai Station (to 1920)

Services
Preceding station	JR East	Following station
Dobukai towards Ōdate	Hanawa Line	Towada-Minami towards Morioka
Location
- Location within Japan

Suehiro Station (末広駅, Suehiro-eki) is a JR East railway station located in the city of Kazuno, Akita Prefecture, Japan.

== Lines ==
Suehiro Station is served by the Hanawa Line, and is located 82.8 rail kilometers from the terminus of the line at Kōma Station.

== Station layout ==
Suehiro Station consists of a single side platform serving one bi-directional track. The station is unattended.

== History ==
Suehiro Station was opened for freight services only on December 25, 1915 as Kemanai Station (毛馬内駅) on the privately owned Akita Railways, serving the village of Nishikigi, Akita. Passenger services began on January 6, 1916. The station was renamed to its present name on March 1, 1920. The line was nationalized on June 1, 1934, becoming part of the Japanese Government Railways (JGR) system. The JGR became the Japan National Railways (JNR) after World War II. The station has been unattended since February 1, 1962. The station was absorbed into the JR East network upon the privatization of the JNR on April 1, 1987. A new shelter was built on the platform in 2005.

== Surrounding area ==
- Route 103

== See also ==
- List of railway stations in Japan
