= Alpas =

Sports complex in Kazuno, Akita, Japan

Kazuno City Athletic Stadium
- 鹿角市陸上競技場

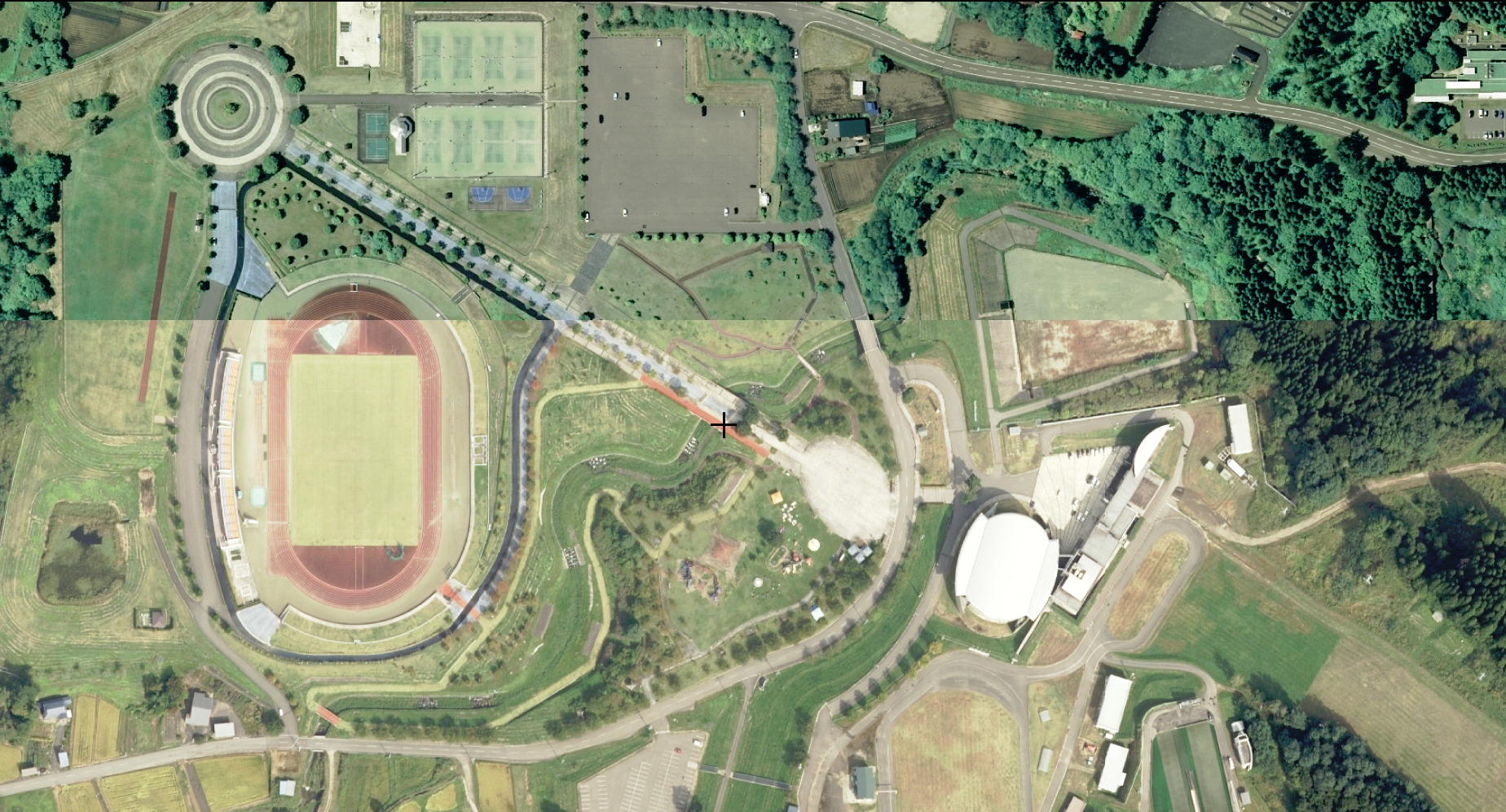

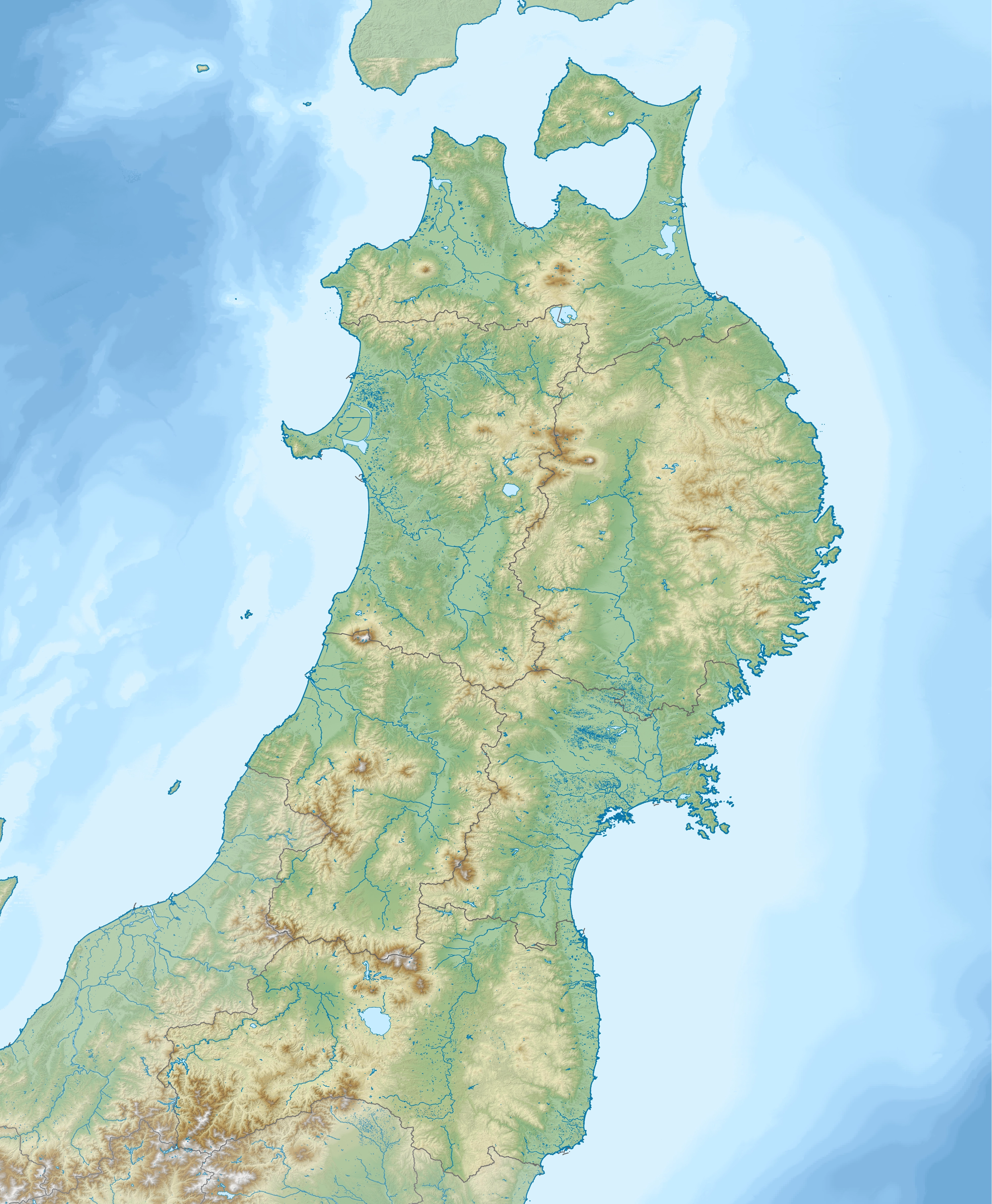
- Location within Akita Prefecture Location within Tohoku, Japan Location within Japan
- Interactive map of Kazuno City Athletic Stadium
- Full name: Kazuno City General Sports Park Athletic Stadium
- Address: 018-5201 Yurisawa 81-1, Hanawa; Kazuno City; Japan
- Coordinates: 40°11′18.5″N 140°49′4.1″E
- Elevation: 231.1 m (758 ft)
- Owner: City of Kazuno
- Operator: Tokyo Biso Kogyo
- Capacity: 5,000
- Public transit: Japan Railways Kazuno Hanawa Station
- Parking: 400 spaces

Construction
- Opened: 1998

Tenants
- Akita FC Cambiare; Junko Asari Cup Ekiden

Website
- www.alpas.jp

Hanawa Jump Hill
- 花輪シャンツェ
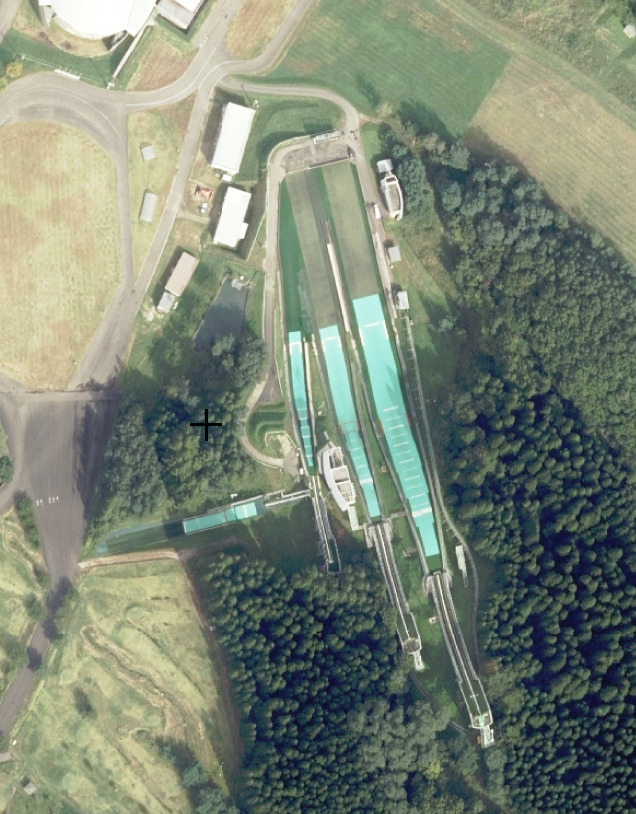
- Location: Kazuno, Akita; Japan
- Operator: Tokyo Biso Kogyo
- Opened: 1954
- Renovated: 2012

Size
- K–point: K-78; K-50; K-15
- Hill size: HS86; HS56; HS30
- Hill record: 88.5 m (Japan) Yuken Iwasa (2016-10-22)

Hanawa Ski Area
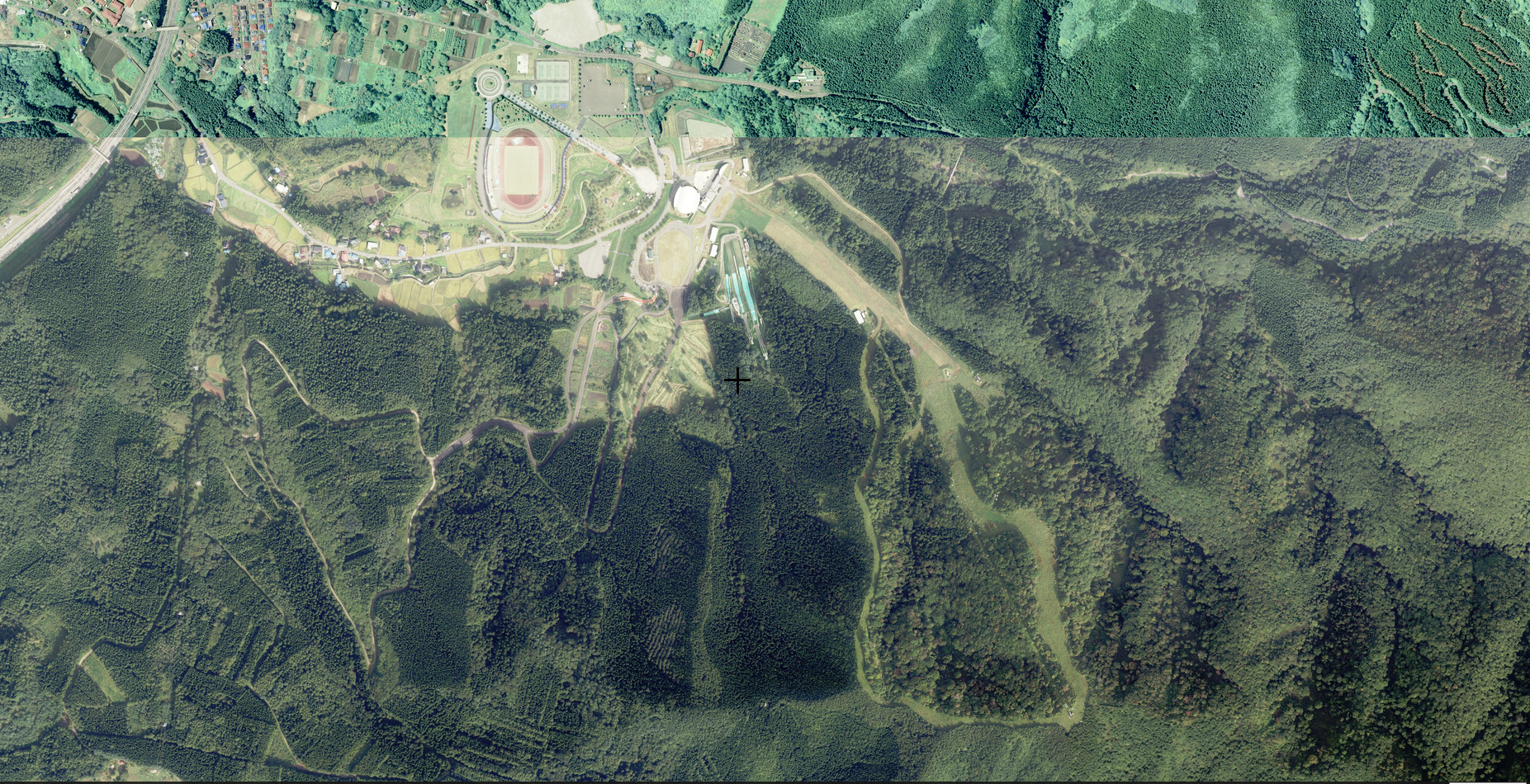
- Satellite view in 2016
- Interactive map of Hanawa Ski Area
- Location: Ōu Mountains
- Nearest city: Kazuno, Akita
- Owner: City of Kazuno
- Vertical: 487 m (1,598 ft)
- Top elevation: 744 m (2,441 ft)
- Base elevation: 257 m (843 ft)
- Trails: 3
- Lift system: 3 (2 pair chairlifts and 1 single chairlifts)
- Snowmaking: 8 Snow making machines available
- Night skiing: Yes (part of cross country course)

Alpas (Japanese: アルパス) is a group of sports facilities in Kazuno, Akita, Japan. Full-scale alpine, jumping ski, cross-country skiing and Nordic combined competitions can be held in one place.

== Kazuno Athletic Stadium ==
Kazuno City General Sports Park Athletic Stadium (鹿角市陸上競技場, Kazuno-shi Rikujō-kyōgijō) is a sports venue in Kazuno, Akita, Japan, and was one of home grounds of the Akita FC Cambiare football team. The Athletic Stadium itself includes a 9-lane athletic track and is one of the main tracks in the Akita Prefecture.

== Hanawa Ski Jumping Hill ==
The Hanawa Ski Jump Hill (花輪ジャンプ競技場, Hanawa Janpu Kyōgijō), also known as the Hanawa-Schanze (花輪シャンツェ, Hanawa Shantse) is a ski jumping venue located in the Alpas Sports Park in Kazuno, Akita, Japan. Owned by Kazuno City, the hill has hosted a number of winter sports events including National Sports Festival of Japan. It is approved by the International Ski Federation. Olympian Ryoyu Kobayashi practiced at this facility as a teenager.

== Hanawa Ski Area ==
The Hanawa Ski Area (花輪スキー場, Hanawa Skī-jō) is the ski resort in Tōhoku region, Japan, operated by City of Kazuno, adjacent to the Towada-Hachimantai National Park. The maximum slope is 31°on the slalom, the longest run is 1.985 km (1.2 mi) and the vertical drop is 487 m (1,598 ft).

=== Courses ===
All slopes allow skiing, snowboarding, and snowscooting.

- Family course for beginners (16°)
- Panorama course for intermediate skiers
- Giant course for advanced skiers
- Cross-country course (10 km)

== Facilities ==
- Arenas
- Training room
- Tennis courts
- Skate board park
- Spa
- Restaurant
- Hotel
- Golf courses
- Meeting rooms
- Ground
- Convention hall
- Aerobics studio/Fitness room
