= Yuta Kimura =

Japanese baseball player

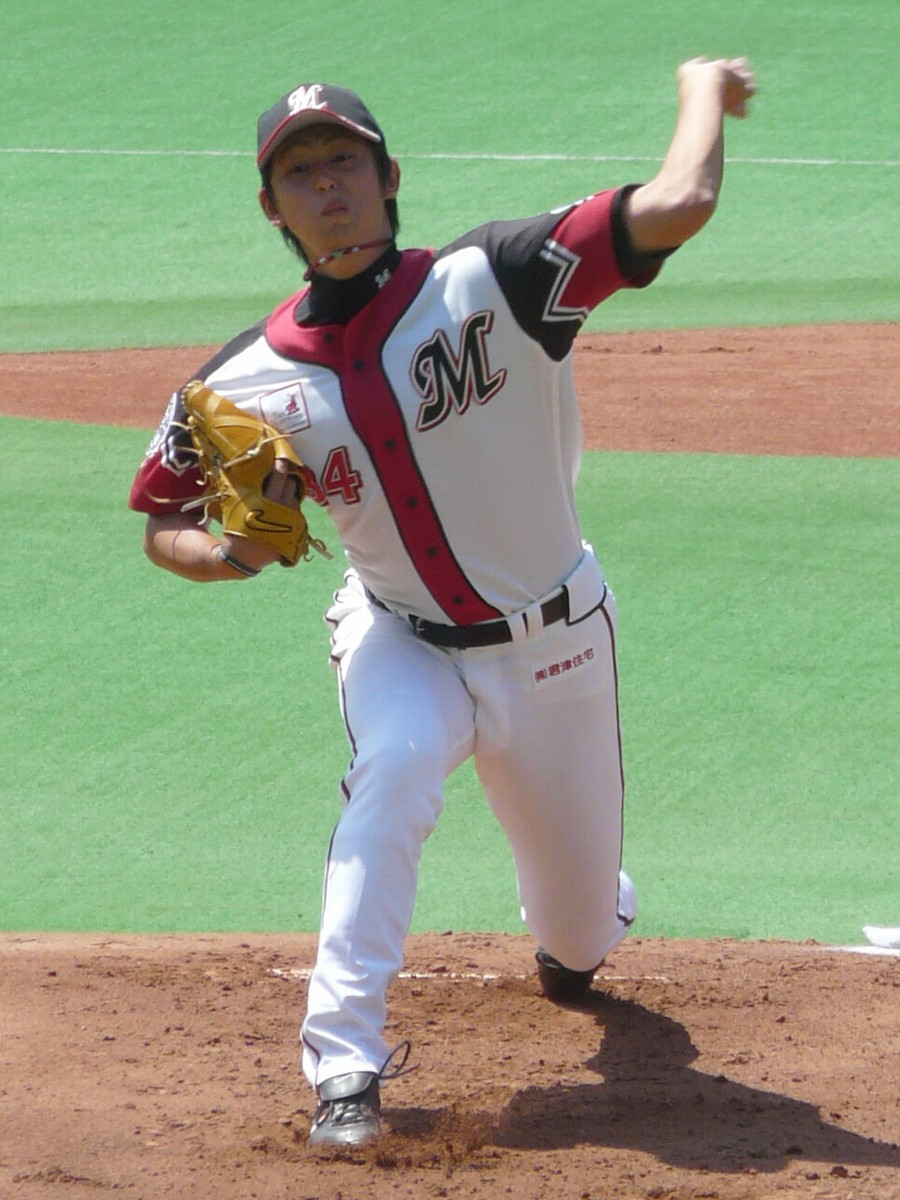
- Kimura with the Chiba Lotte Marines
- Pitcher
- Born: May 21, 1985 (age 41)
- Bats: Left Throws: Left

NPB debut
- 2011, for the Chiba Lotte Marines

NPB statistics (through 2016)
- Win–loss record: 1–6
- ERA: 5.24
- Strikeouts: 56
- Stats at Baseball Reference

Teams
- Chiba Lotte Marines (2011–2012, 2014–2016)

Yuta Kimura (木村 優太, Kimura Yūta; born May 21, 1985 in Kazuno, Akita) is a Japanese former professional baseball pitcher in Japan's Nippon Professional Baseball. He played with the Chiba Lotte Marines from 2011 to 2012 and from 2014 to 2016.
