= Dainichido Bugaku =

Yearly set of nine sacred ritual dances and music

Coordinates: 40.1442°N 140.8058°E

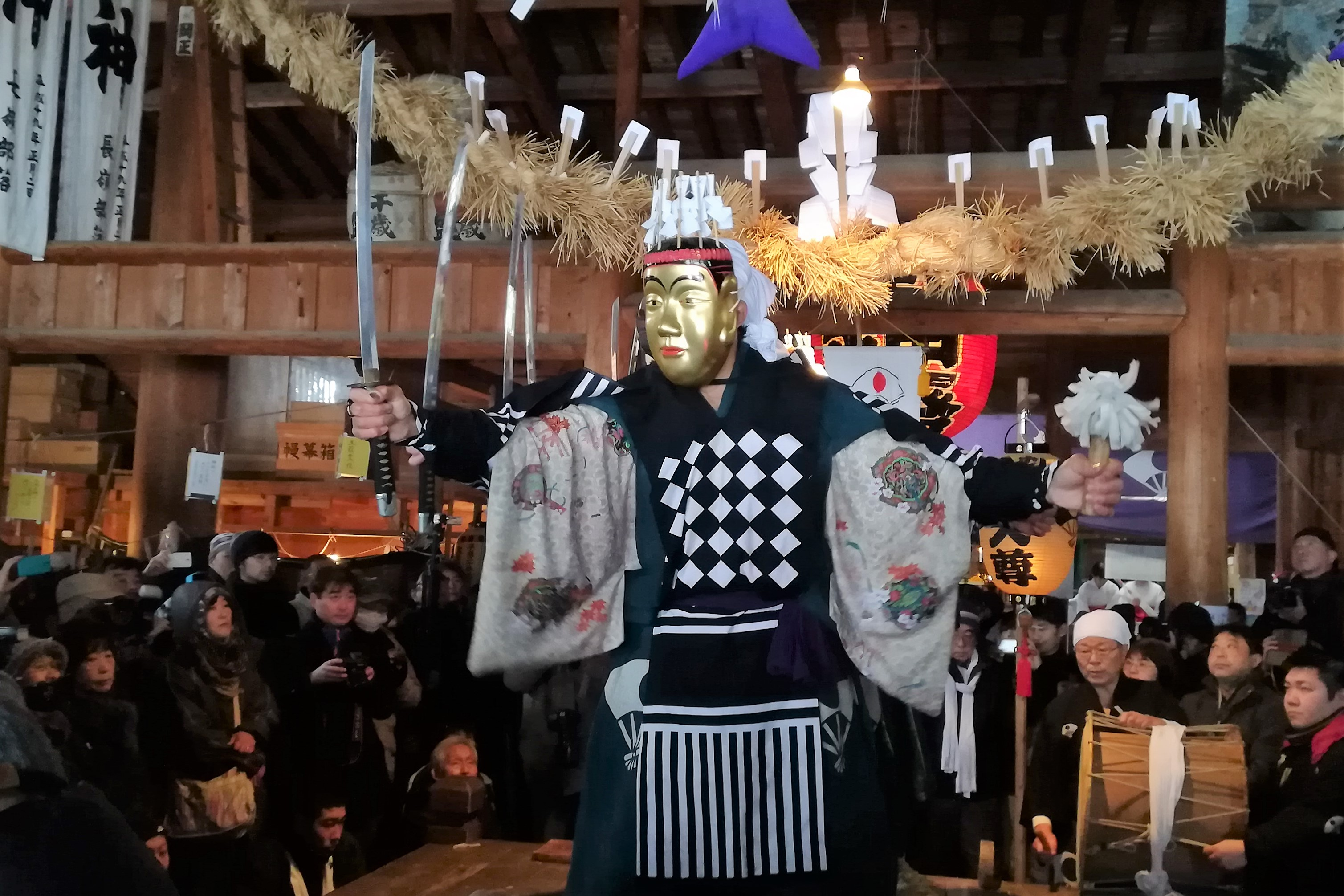
- Medium: Dance and music
- Originating culture: Japan

Dainichido Bugaku
- UNESCO Intangible Cultural Heritage
- Country: Japan
- Reference: 00275
- Region: Asia and the Pacific

Inscription history
- Inscription: 2009 (4th session)
- List: Representative

Dainichido Bugaku (Japanese: 大日堂舞楽, meaning: Vairocana Temple Dance and Entertainment) is a yearly set of nine sacred ritual dances and music, named for the imperial palace ensemble performances, "bugaku", and from the palace's ensemble's visit to Hachimantai, Kazuno District, Akita Prefecture, during the reconstruction of the local shrine pavilion, "Dainichido", in the early eighth century, and their teaching of dances to the locals.

Instruments include the flute and taiko. The order and number of dances has changed over time, with the current order of seven dances being the Gongen-mai, Koma-mai, Uhen-mai, Tori-mai, Godaison-mai, Kōshō-mai, and Dengaku-mai dances. Masks include representations of shishi and Vairocana.

The dances have a 1300-year history (Nara period), and though interrupted for nearly sixty years in the late eighteenth century, the dances, some of which may include children or masks, are still practiced on January second from sunrise to noon in shrines throughout communities in Osato, Azukisawa, Nagamine, and Taniuchi, including Hachimantai.

Yamaji Kōzō dates Dainichido Bugaku as arising during and after the Nara (CE 710 to 794) and mid-Heian periods (CE 794 to 1185), after state support of Shinto temple complexes (originally ordered by Emperor Shōmu (CE 701 – 756)) began to decline and court and temple performers took residence in local communities, which then preserved genres such as Dainichido Bugaku as folk arts.
