= Hashiba Station =

Former railway station in Iwate Prefecture, Japan

Coordinates: 39°41′42″N 140°53′27″E

Hashiba Station 橋場駅
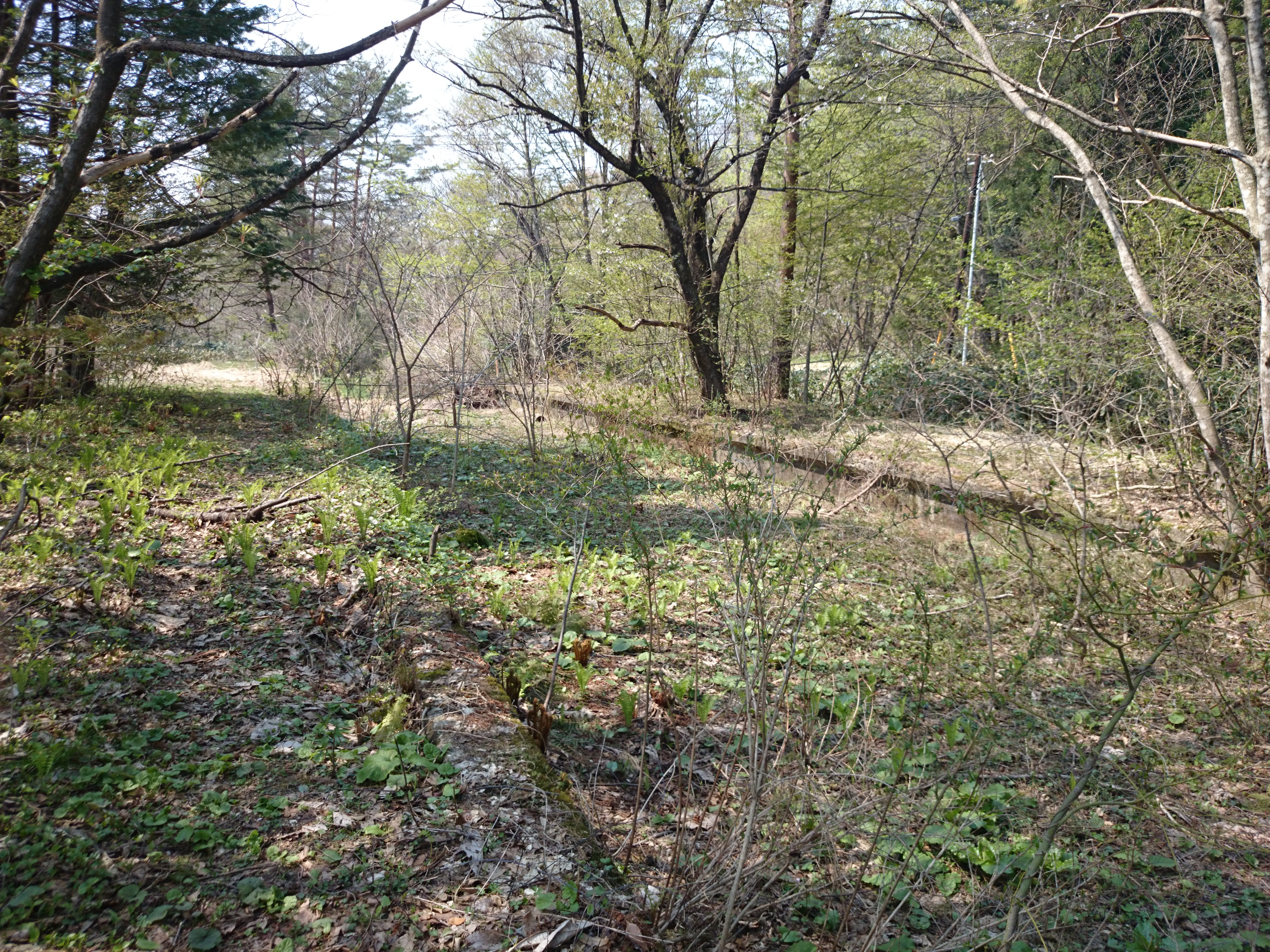
- Former platform (2015)

General information
- Location: Iwate District, Shizukuishi-cho Hashiba, Iwate-ken; Japan
- Operator: JR East
- Line: Hashiba Line (current Tazawako Line)
- Distance: 23.7 kilometers from Morioka
- Platforms: 2 platforms

Other information
- Status: Unstaffed

History
- Opened: July 15, 1922
- Closed: October 1, 1944 (de-facto)
Location

Hashiba Station (橋場駅, Hashiba Eki) was a railway station in Shizukuishi, Iwate. It was the terminal station of JGR Hashiba Line. Although it is not officially closed, the station is de-facto considered abandoned.

== Layout ==
Hashiba Station had two side platforms serving two tracks.

== History ==
The station was originally built in a part of a plan to connect Morioka Station with Ōmagari Station while passing through Tazawako Station. The line opened in 1922 along with the station as "Hashiba Line". However, the operation between Shizukuishi and this station was suspended in 1944 after the section was deemed unnecessary, and the rail was removed from the section. The construction of the rest of the line was planned again after World War II, but the route to connect the line to Tazawako changed to head south from the newly opened Akabuchi Station, largely missing Hashiba station. The "Hashiba Line" route was de-facto abandoned and replaced with the Tazawako Line, although the station was not officially closed.
