= Akabuchi Station =

Railway station in Shizukuishi, Iwate Prefecture, Japan

Akabuchi Station 赤渕駅
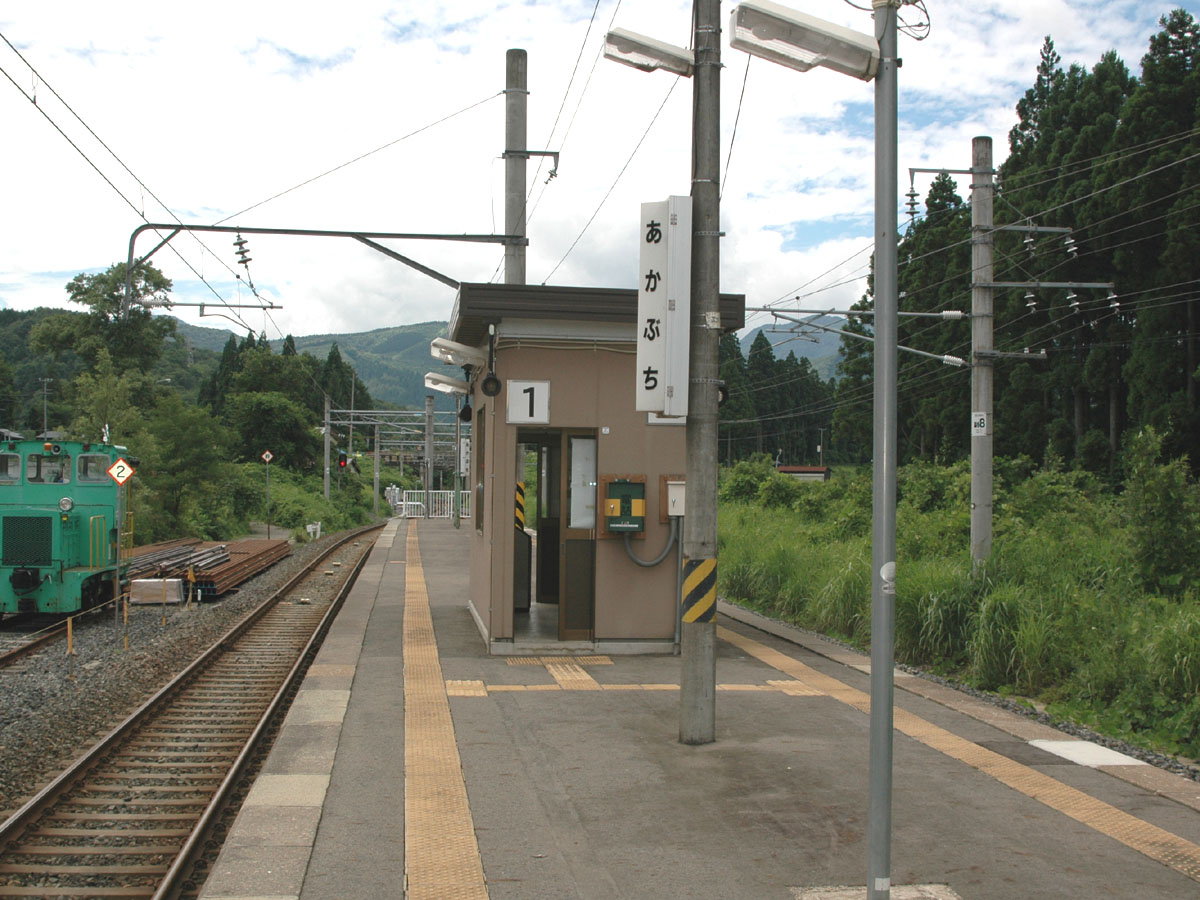
- Akabuchi Station in July 2007

General information
- Location: Omyojin Akabuchi, Shizukuishi-cho, Iwate-gun, Iwate-ken 020-0581; Japan
- Coordinates: 39°41′6.5″N 140°54′25.9″E
- Operator: JR East
- Line: ■ Tazawako Line
- Distance: 22.0 km from Morioka
- Platforms: 1 island platform
- Tracks: 2

Construction
- Structure type: At grade

Other information
- Status: Unstaffed
- Website: Official website

History
- Opened: September 10, 1964

Services
Preceding station	JR East	Following station
Tazawako towards Ōmagari	Tazawako Line	Harukiba towards Morioka
Location
- Location within Japan

Akabuchi Station (赤渕駅, Akabuchi-eki) is an East Japan Railway Company (JR East) railway station located in the town of Shizukuishi, Iwate Prefecture, Japan.

== Lines ==
Akabuchi Station is served by the Tazawako Line, and is located 22.0 rail kilometers from the terminus of the line at Morioka Station.

== Station layout ==
Akabuchi Station has a single island platform. There is no station building, but only a weather shelter on the platform itself. The station is unattended.

=== Platforms ===
1	■ Tazawako Line	for Tazawako for Shizukuishi, Morioka (trains originating at this station)
2	■ Tazawako Line	for Shizukuishi for Morioka

== History ==
Akabuchi Station opened on September 10, 1964, as the terminal station of the now defunct Hashiba Line. It became a station on the Tazawako Line from October 20, 1966. The station was absorbed into the JR East network upon the privatization of the JNR on April 1, 1987.

== Surrounding area ==
- National Route 46
- Kunimi Onsen

== See also ==
- List of railway stations in Japan
