= Uguisuno Station =

Railway station in Daisen, Akita Prefecture, Japan

Uguisuno Station 鶯野駅
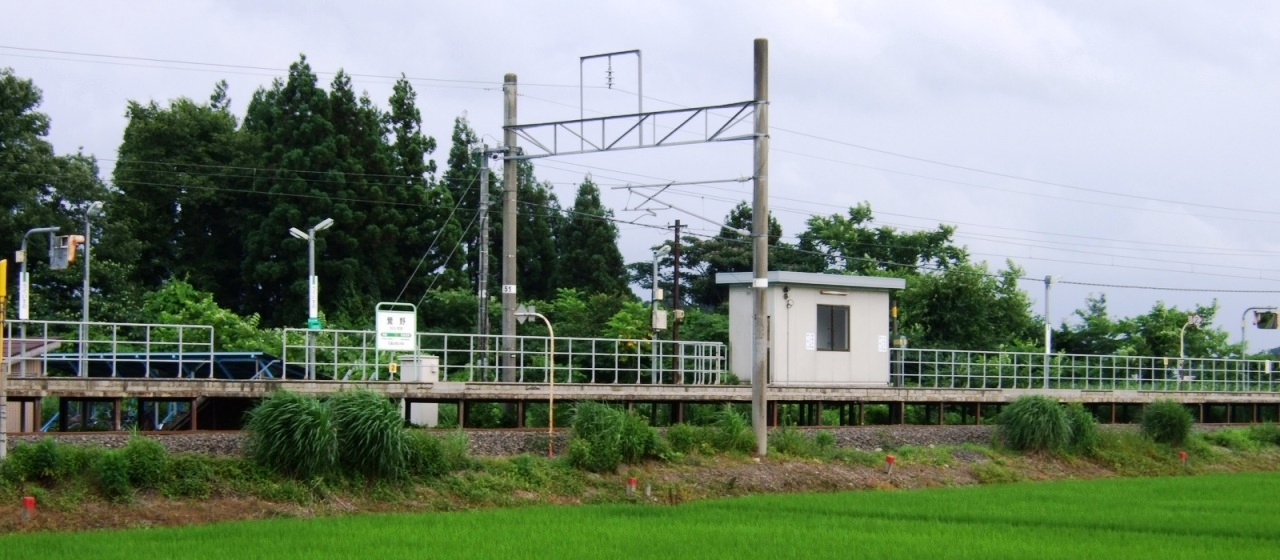
- Uguisuno Station in October 2006

General information
- Location: 89 Kaminakajima Shimo-Uguisuno, Daisen-sen, Akita-ken 014-0201; Japan
- Coordinates: 39°34′6.7″N 140°33′28.7″E
- Operator: JR East
- Line: ■ Tazawako Line
- Distance: 61.6 kilometers from Morioka
- Platforms: 1 side platform

Other information
- Status: Unstaffed
- Website: Official website

History
- Opened: November 21, 1965

Services
Preceding station	JR East	Following station
Ugo-Nagano towards Ōmagari	Tazawako Line	Kakunodate towards Morioka
Location
- Location within Akita Prefecture Location within Japan

Uguisuno Station (鶯野駅, Uguisuno-eki) is a railway station located in the city of Daisen, Akita Prefecture, Japan, operated by JR East.

== Lines ==
Uguisuno Station is served by the Tazawako Line, and is located 61.6 km from the terminus of the line at Morioka Station.

== Station layout ==
The station consists of one side platform serving a single bi-directional traffic. There is no station building, but only a shelter built on the platform. The station is unattended.

== History ==
Uguisuno Station opened on November 21, 1965 as a station on the Japan National Railways (JNR) serving the town of Nakasen, Akita. The station was absorbed into the JR East network upon the privatization of the JNR on April 1, 1987.

== Surrounding area ==
- National Route 105

== See also ==
- List of railway stations in Japan
