= Kebaraichi Station =

Railway station in Miyako, Iwate Prefecture, Japan

Kebaraichi Station 花原市駅
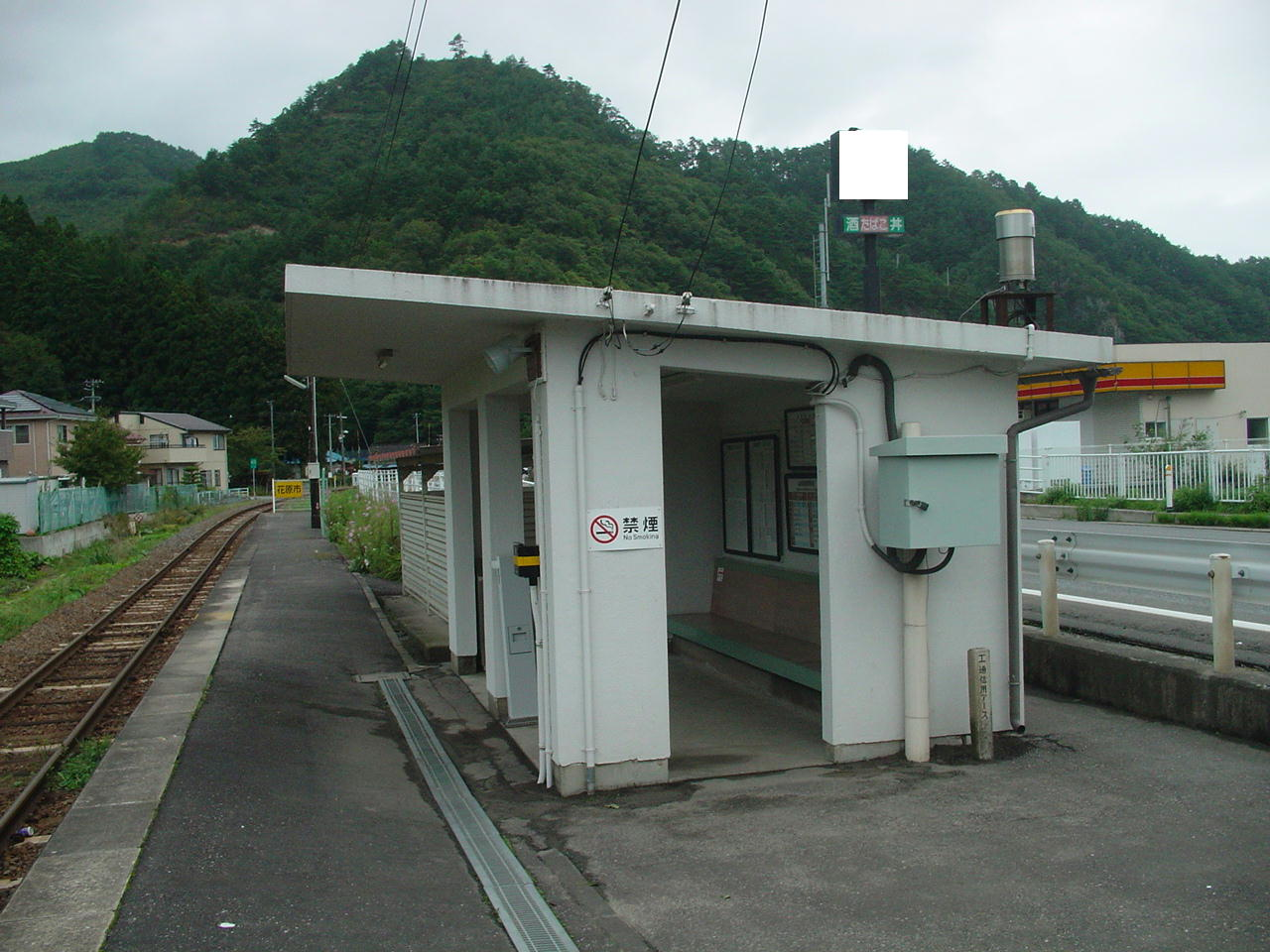
- Kebaraichi Station, September 2007

General information
- Location: Kebaraichi, Miyako-shi, Iwate-ken 027-0046; Japan
- Coordinates: 39.6300°N 141.8613°E
- Operator: JR East
- Line: ■ Yamada Line
- Distance: 94.2 km from Morioka
- Platforms: 1 side platform
- Tracks: 1

Construction
- Structure type: At grade

Other information
- Status: Unstaffed
- Website: Official website

History
- Opened: 20 December 1961

Services
Preceding station	JR East	Following station
Hikime towards Morioka	Yamada Line Local	Sentoku towards Miyako
Location
- Location within Japan

Kebaraichi Station (花原市駅, Kebaraichi-eki) is a railway station on the Yamada Line in the city of Miyako, Iwate, Japan, operated by East Japan Railway Company (JR East).

== Lines ==
Kebaraichi Station is served by the Yamada Line, and is located 94.2 rail kilometers from the terminus of the line at Morioka Station.

== Station layout ==
Kebaraichi Station has a single side platform serving a single bi-directional track. There is no station building, but only a waiting room built on the platform. The station is unattended.

== History ==
Kebaraichi Station opened on 20 December 1961. The station was absorbed into the JR East network upon the privatization of the Japanese National Railways (JNR) on 1 April 1987.

== Surrounding area ==
- Japan National Route 106

== See also ==
- List of railway stations in Japan
