= Sentoku Station =

Railway station in Miyako, Iwate Prefecture, Japan

Sentoku Station 千徳駅
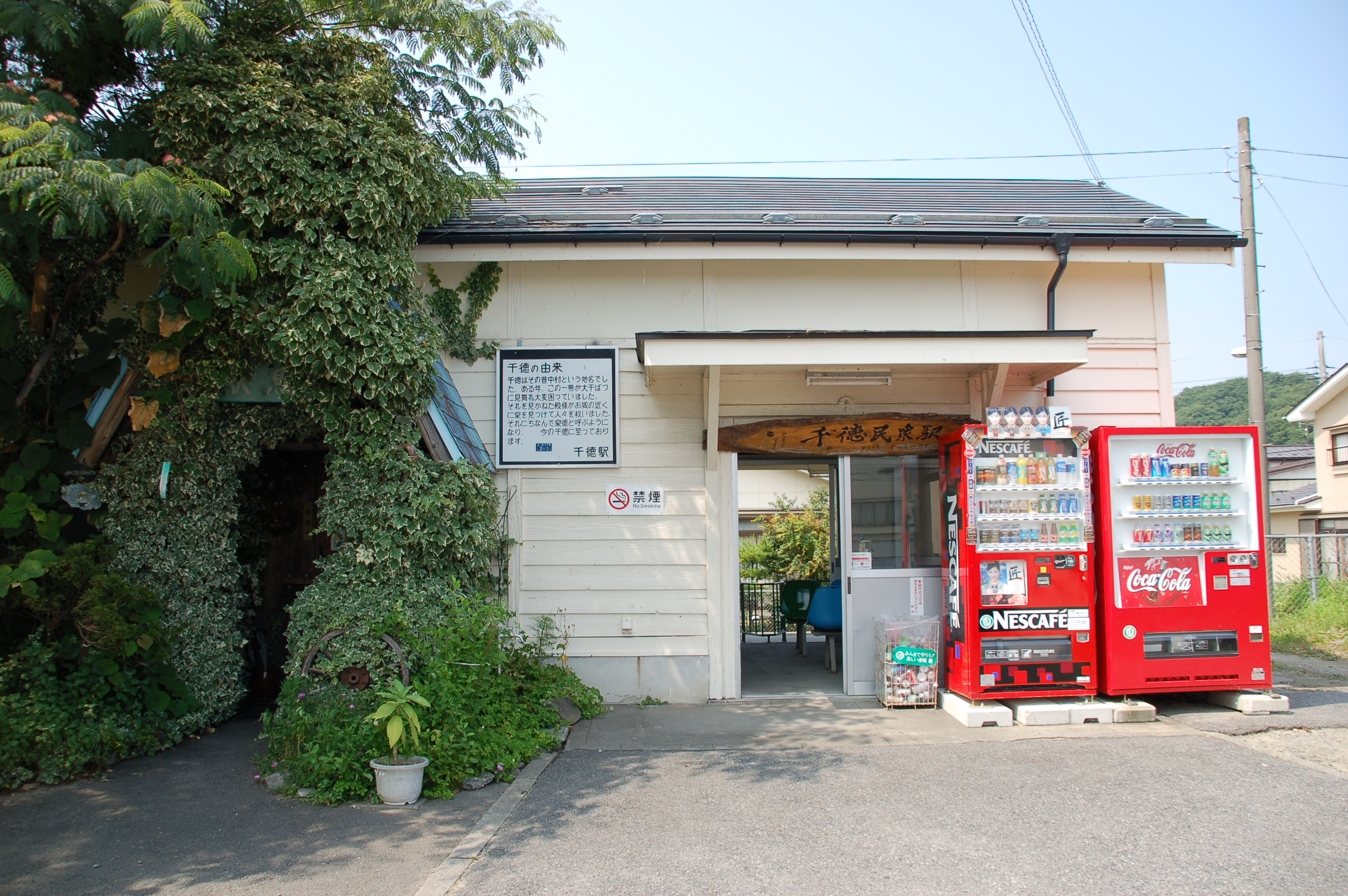
- Sentoku Station, August 2006

General information
- Location: 2-7-1 Kanpana, Miyako-shi, Iwate-ken 027-0044; Japan
- Coordinates: 39.6321°N 141.9122°E
- Operator: JR East
- Line: ■ Yamada Line
- Distance: 89.8 km from Morioka
- Platforms: 1 side platform
- Tracks: 1

Construction
- Structure type: At grade

Other information
- Status: Unstaffed
- Website: Official website

History
- Opened: 8 November 1934

Services
Preceding station	JR East	Following station
Moichi towards Morioka	Yamada Line Rapid Rias	Miyako Terminus
Kebaraichi towards Morioka	Yamada Line Local	Miyako Terminus
Location
- Location within Japan

Sentoku Station (千徳駅, Sentoku-eki) is a railway station on the Yamada Line in the city of Miyako, Iwate, Japan, operated by East Japan Railway Company (JR East).

== Lines ==
Sentoku Station is served by the Yamada Line, and is located 98.8 rail kilometers from the terminus of the line at Morioka Station.

== Station layout ==
Sentoku Station has a single side platform serving a single bi-directional track. The station is unattended.

== History ==
Sentoku Station opened on 8 November 1934. The station was absorbed into the JR East network upon the privatization of the Japanese National Railways (JNR) on 1 April 1987.

== Surrounding area ==
- Japan National Route 106

== See also ==
- List of railway stations in Japan
