= Maegata Station =

Railway station in Morioka, Iwate Prefecture, Japan

Maegata Station 前潟駅
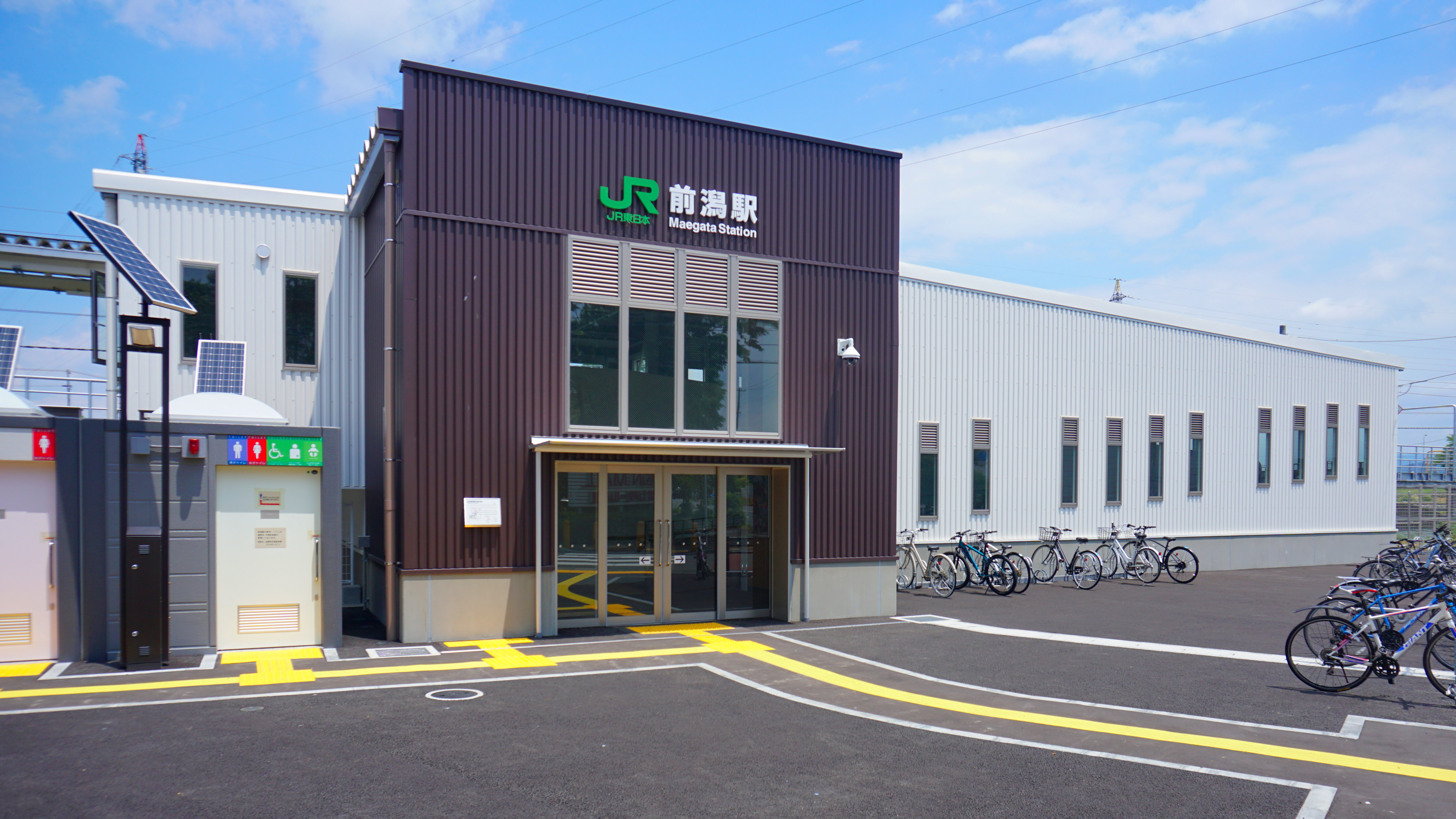
- Station building (June 2023)

General information
- Location: 153-1 Kamikuriyagawa-Maegata, Morioka, Iwate Prefecture 020-0143; Japan
- Coordinates: 39°42′46.09″N 141°06′3.6″E
- Operator: JR East
- Line: Tazawako Line
- Distance: 72.2 km (44.9 mi) from Omagari
- Platforms: 1 side platform
- Tracks: 1

Construction
- Cycle facilities: Yes
- Accessible: Yes

Other information
- Status: Unstaffed station
- Website: Official website

History
- Opened: 18 March 2023

Services
Preceding station	JR East	Following station
Okama towards Ōmagari	Tazawako Line	Morioka Terminus
Location
- Location within Iwate Prefecture Location within Japan

Maegata Station (前潟駅, Maegata-eki) is a railway station in the city of Morioka in Iwate Prefecture, Japan. It is operated by the East Japan Railway Company (JR East). The station was opened on March 18, 2023. According to the city of Morioka, the station is expected to record 1,700 passengers per day.

== History ==
- 2020
  - January 16: The city of Morioka submits a petition to JR East to establish a station.
  - August: Morioka and JR East conclude a basic agreement on the establishment of a station.
  - October: Morioka and JR East sign a station design agreement.
- 2021
  - February 25: Morioka and Aeon Mall conclude an agreement regarding the development of this station.
  - August: The design of the station is completed.
  - December: Construction of the station starts.
- 2022
  - January 27: The name for the station is decided.
  - April 27: A ceremony to pray for safety is held.
- 2023
  - March 18: Opening of the station.
  - May 27: IC card Suica will be available.

== Station design ==
It is an above-ground station with an 85 m (279 ft) long single platform for 4-car trains with a shaded area the length of 2-car trains or approximately 40 m (130 ft). The station itself is a one-story steel frame building with a waiting room of about 15 m^{2} (160 sq ft).

It is located on the north side of Aeon Mall Morioka. In front of the station, there is a station square and rotary maintained by the city of Morioka, a boarding and alighting station for people with physical disabilities, and a bicycle parking station for about 100 bicycles, as well as parking for 5 motorcycles.

The station is unstaffed and does not have an automobile parking lot, but does have a drop-off area and a waiting area for one taxi. A simple Suica ticket gate is installed.There are no automatic ticket vending machine or numbered ticket issuing machines at this station. In lieu of an elevator, there is a ramp up to the platform level inside the station building. Washrooms are also available inside the station.

Maegata Station

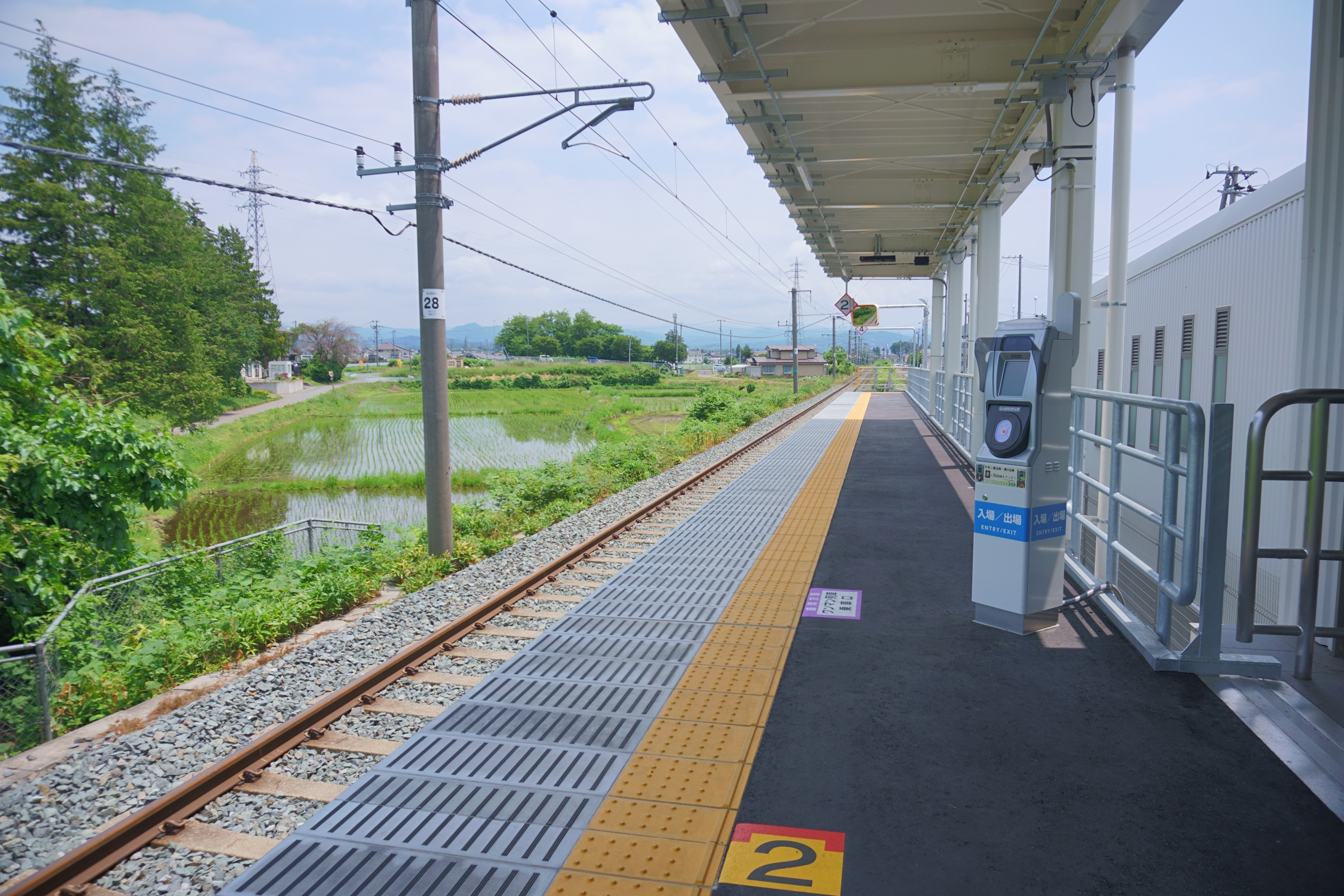
Platform with simple Suica turnstile (June 2023)

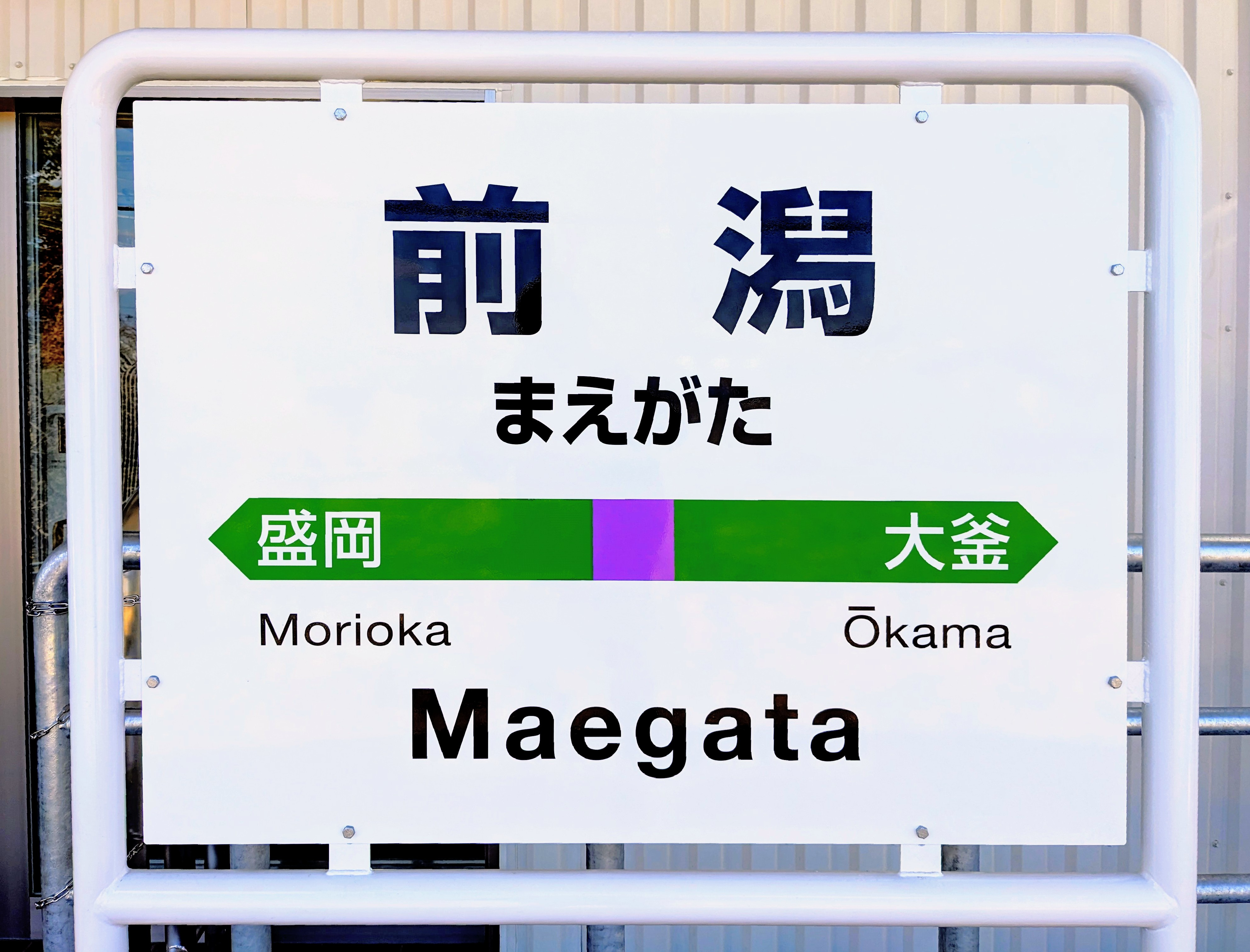
Station name sign (March 2023)

== Funding ==
The station was requested to be built after a petition by the city of Morioka. The total project cost of about ¥1.1 billion was provided by the city, including grants from the government, as well as ¥200 million contributed by Aeon Mall to the project.

== Station area ==
There are commercial facilities on the south side of the station, and the Shizukuishi River flows to the south. The Morioka West Bypass and Iwate/Akita Prefectural Route 1 pass through this side. The interchange of the Tohoku Expressway is also on this side. There are fields on the north side of the station, and the Morokuzu River flows behind them. On the opposite bank of the river is a large residential area.

- AEON MALL Morioka
- Tohoku Expressway Morioka Interchange
- Morioka nishi bypass
- Iwate Prefectural Road/Akita Prefectural Road No. 1 Morioka Yokote Line
- Shizukuishi River
- Morokuzu River

== See also ==
- List of railway stations in Japan
- List of stations opened by petition in Japan
- Makuharitoyosuna Station - A station in Chiba Prefecture that opened on the same day. Like this station, AEON MALL bears part of the construction costs.
