= Gosannen Station =

Railway station in Misato, Akita Prefecture, Japan

Gosannen Station 後三年駅
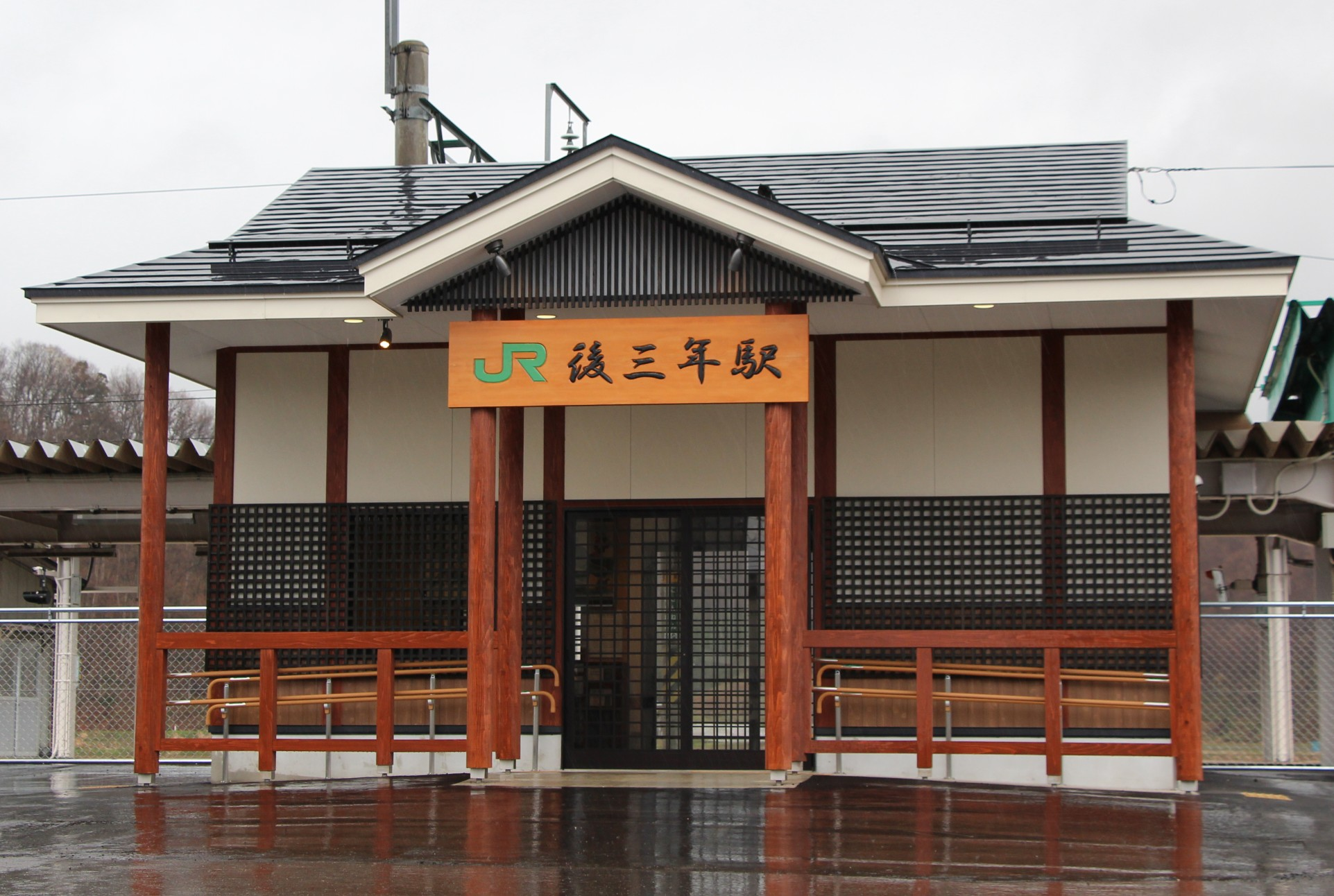
- Gosannen Station in December 2012

General information
- Location: 107, Higashiyamamoto, Iizume, Misato-cho, Senboku-gun, Akita-ken 019-1234; Japan
- Coordinates: 39°21′52″N 140°32′18″E
- Operator: JR East
- Line: ■ Ōu Main Line
- Distance: 234.7 kilometers from Fukushima
- Platforms: 1 side + 1 island platform

Other information
- Status: Staffed
- Website: Official website

History
- Opened: December 12, 1921

Services
Preceding station	JR East	Following station
Yokote towards Shinjō	Ōu Main Line Local	Iizume towards Aomori
Location
- Location within Akita Prefecture Location within Japan

Gosannen Station (後三年駅, Gosannen-eki) is a railway station in the town of Misato, Akita Prefecture, Japan, operated by JR East. The station name origins from the historic battlefield of Gosannen War in the area. The station includes a parking lot fitting 100 vehicles, a restaurant, and a wholesaler.

== Lines ==
Gosannen Station is served by the Ōu Main Line and is located 234.7 km from the terminus of the line at Fukushima Station.

== Station layout ==
The station consists of one side platform and one island platform connected to the station building by a footbridge. The station is unattended.

=== Platforms ===
1	■ Ōu Main Line	for Akita and Ōmagari
2, 3	■ Ōu Main Line	Shinjō and Yamagata

== History ==
Gosannen Station opened on 12 December 1921, as a station on the Japanese Government Railways (JGR), serving the village of Lizume. The JGR became the Japan National Railways (JNR) after World War II. The station was absorbed into the JR East network upon the privatization of the JNR on 1 April 1987. A new station building was completed on 12 December 2012.

== Surrounding area ==
- Gosannen War Museum (後三年の役金沢資料館)

== See also ==
- List of railway stations in Japan
