= Tazawako Line =

Railway line in Morioka & Akita Prefectures, Japan

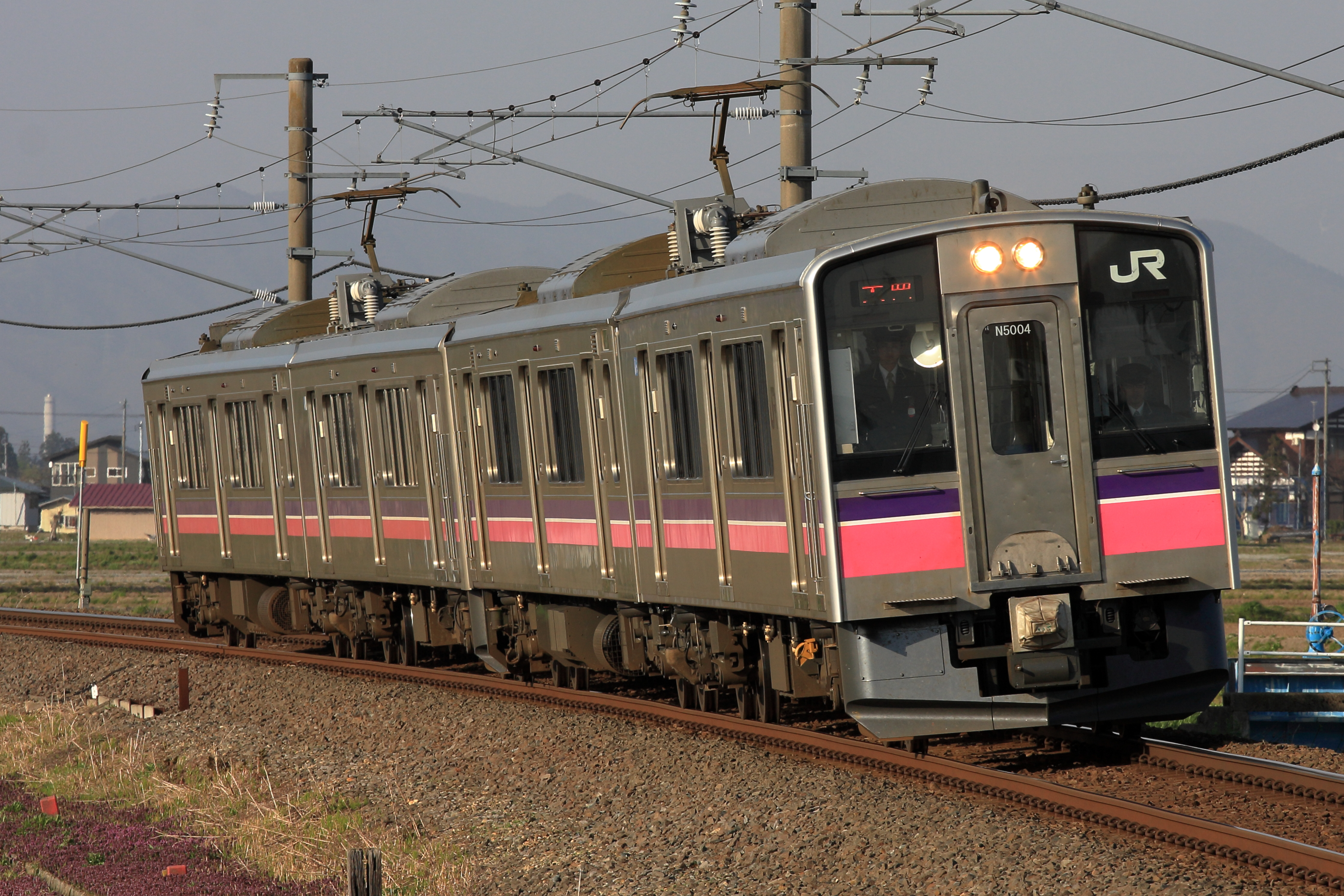
- 701-5000 series train on the Tazawako Line in 2015

Overview
- Native name: 田沢湖線
- Locale: Iwate, Akita prefectures
- Termini: Morioka; Ōmagari
- Stations: 18

Service
- Type: Heavy rail
- Operator: JR East
- Rolling stock: 701 series

History
- Opened: 25 June 1921; 105 years ago

Technical
- Line length: 75.6 km (47.0 mi)
- Track gauge: 1,435 mm (4 ft 8 1/2 in) standard gauge
- Electrification: Overhead line, 20 kV 50 Hz AC
- Operating speed: 110 km/h (68 mph)
Route map

The Tazawako Line (Japanese: 田沢湖線, Hepburn: Tazawako-sen) is a railway line operated by East Japan Railway Company (JR East) connecting Morioka Station in Morioka, Iwate and Ōmagari Station in Daisen, Akita, Japan.

Akita Shinkansen Komachi trains travel over the line, which was regauged in 1997 from 1,067 mm (3 ft 6 in) to 1,435 mm (4 ft 8 1/2 in).

== History ==
The section from Morioka to Shizukuishi opened on 25 June 1921, as the Hashiba Light Railway (橋場軽便), and was extended to Hashiba on 2 September 1922. Services to Hashiba Station ended in the 1940s.

The Omagari - Jindai section was opened in 1921 and extended to Tazawako in 1923.

In 1964, the Shizukuishi to Akabuchi section opened, and upon completion of the 3,915 m (2.433 mi) Sengan Tunnel, the Akabuchi to Tazawako section opened on 20 October 1966, completing the line.

Freight services ceased in 1982, the year the entire line was electrified.

In 1997, the line was converted to 1,435 mm (4 ft 8 1/2 in) gauge, and became part of the Akita Shinkansen, with standard-gauge electric multiple unit (EMU) trains providing local services on the line.

In January 2022 it was announced that Maegata Station would be added between Morioka Station and Ōkama Station. Maegata station opened for service on 18 March 2023.

== Station list ==
Station	Distance from Morioka in km (mi)	Transfers	Location	
Morioka	0 (0)	Akita Shinkansen; Tōhoku Shinkansen; Tōhoku Main Line; Yamada Line; Iwate Galaxy Railway Line	Morioka	Iwate; Prefecture
Maegata	3.4 (2.1)		Morioka	Iwate; Prefecture
Ōkama	6.0 (3.7)		Takizawa	Iwate; Prefecture
Koiwai	10.5 (6.5)		Takizawa	Iwate; Prefecture
Shizukuishi	16.0 (9.9)	Akita Shinkansen	Shizukuishi	Iwate; Prefecture
Harukiba	18.7 (11.6)		Shizukuishi	Iwate; Prefecture
Akabuchi	22.0 (13.7)		Shizukuishi	Iwate; Prefecture
Tazawako	40.1 (24.9)	Akita Shinkansen	Senboku	Akita; Prefecture
Sashimaki	44.4 (27.6)		Senboku	Akita; Prefecture
Jindai	52.8 (32.8)		Senboku	Akita; Prefecture
Shōden	55.3 (34.4)		Senboku	Akita; Prefecture
Kakunodate	58.8 (36.5)	Akita Shinkansen; Akita Nairiku Line	Senboku	Akita; Prefecture
Uguisuno	61.6 (38.3)		Daisen	Akita; Prefecture
Ugo-Nagano	64.6 (40.1)		Daisen	Akita; Prefecture
Yariminai	67.9 (42.2)		Daisen	Akita; Prefecture
Ugo-Yotsuya	70.2 (43.6)		Daisen	Akita; Prefecture
Kita-Ōmagari	72.0 (44.7)		Daisen	Akita; Prefecture
Ōmagari	75.6 (47.0)	Akita Shinkansen; Ōu Main Line	Daisen	Akita; Prefecture

Passing loops

- Ōchizawa passing loop (大地沢信号場, Ōchizawa-shingōjō) is a passing loop located in Shizukuishi, Iwate. (39°40′29″N 140°50′31″E)
- Shidonai passing loop (志度内信号場, Shidonai-shingōjō) is a passing loop located in Senboku, Akita.(39°41′25″N 140°46′48″E)

=== Rolling stock ===
As of 2022, 701-5000 series trains belonging to Akita General Rolling Stock Center are used on this line.
