= Akita Shinkansen =

High-speed railway line in Japan

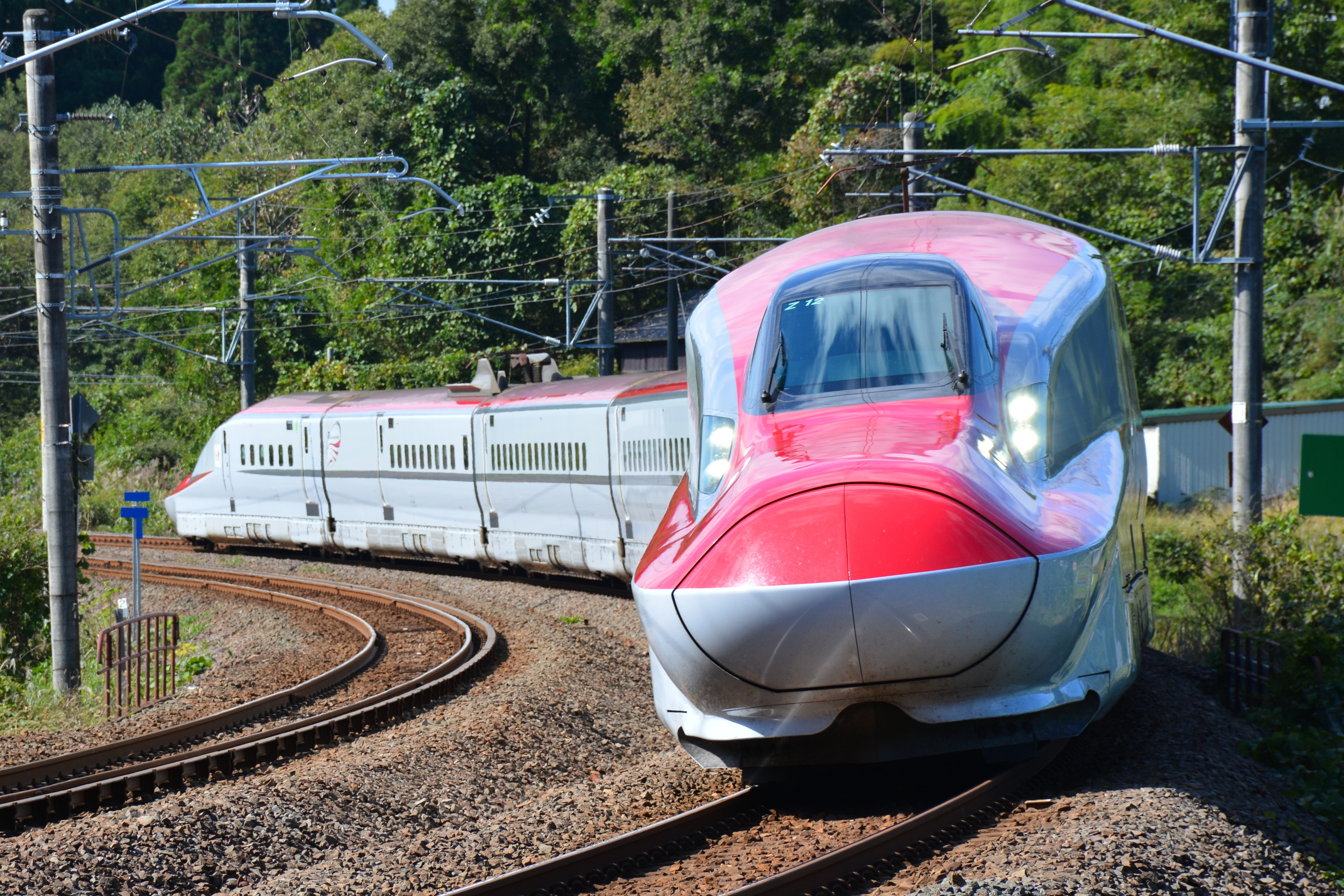
- An E6 series trainset on the Akita Shinkansen

Overview
- Native name: 秋田新幹線
- Owner: JR East
- Locale: Iwate and Akita prefectures
- Termini: Akita; Morioka (through service to Tokyo)
- Stations: 6
- Color on map: Crimson

Service
- Type: Mini-Shinkansen
- Services: Komachi
- Operator: JR East
- Depot: Akita
- Rolling stock: E6 series

History
- Opened: 22 March 1997; 29 years ago

Technical
- Line length: 127.3 km (79.1 mi)
- Number of tracks: 1 and 2
- Track gauge: 1,435 mm (4 ft 8 1/2 in) standard gauge
- Electrification: Overhead line, 20 kV 50 Hz AC
- Operating speed: 130 km/h (81 mph)
Route map
Akita Shinkansen in blue, through service via the Tōhoku Shinkansen in red

The Akita Shinkansen (Japanese: 秋田新幹線) is a mini-Shinkansen route in Japan, operated by East Japan Railway Company (JR East). It provides service between Akita and Morioka over the Tazawako Line and Ōu Main Line. At Morioka, trains connect onto the Tōhoku Shinkansen tracks for through service to Tokyo.

== History ==
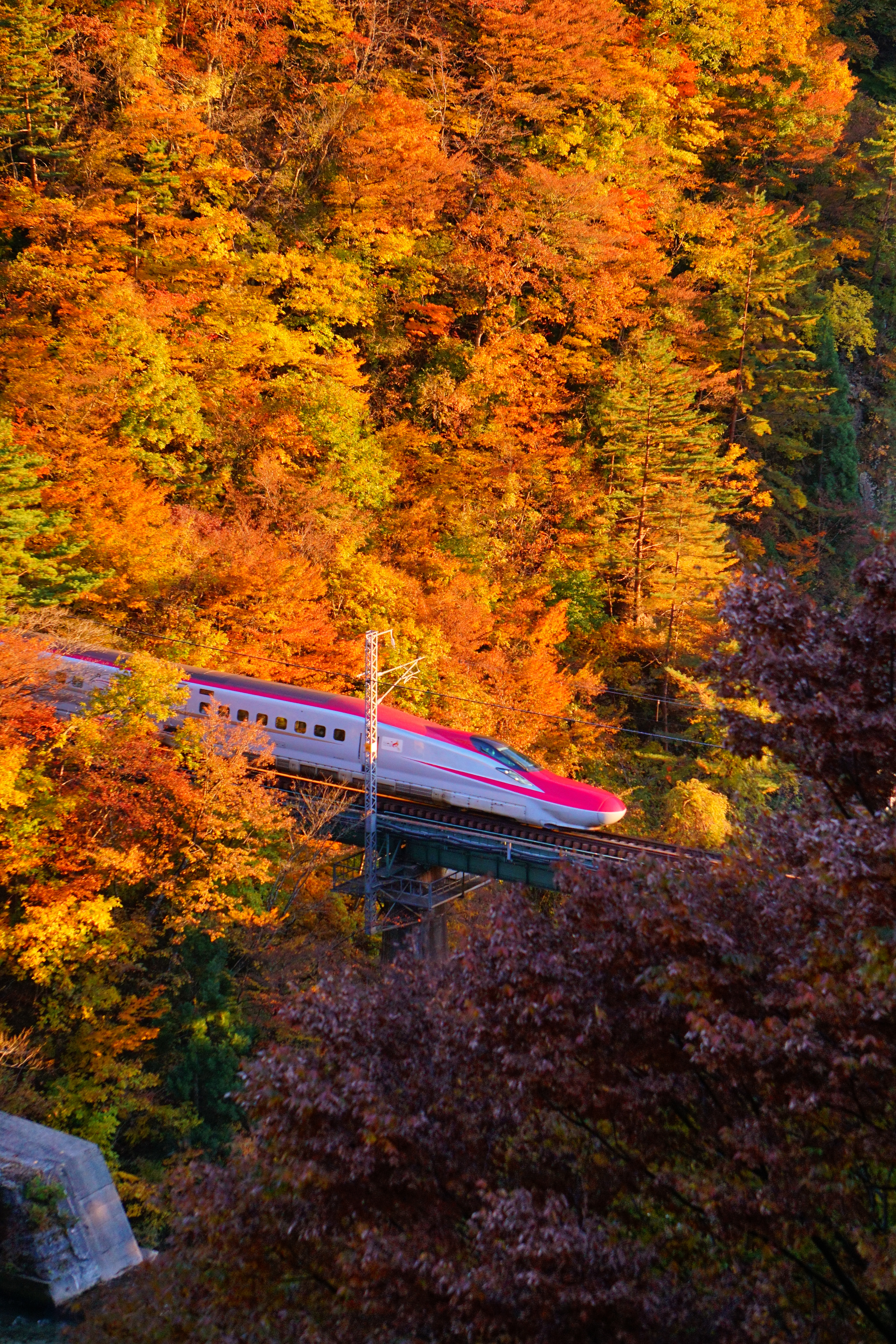
Series E6 Shinkansen EMU runs on Tazawako Line

The groundbreaking ceremony for the Akita Shinkansen was held in front of Akita Station on 13 March 1992, and track work began the same month. JR East introduced a continuous track renewal machine imported from the United States, the first time such equipment was used in Japan, significantly reducing labor requirements and construction time.

In the first stage of construction, a single standard-gauge track was created alongside a 51.7-kilometre (32.1 mi) section of the narrow-gauge Ōu Main Line between Akita and Ōmagari. Additionally, on a 13-kilometre (8.1 mi) section between Jingūji and Mineyoshikawa, a third running rail was also installed on parallel the narrow-gauge tracks, creating a dual-track section where mini-Shinkansen trains could pass each other at speed on the mostly single-track line.

In the second stage, the 75-kilometre (47 mi) narrow-gauge Tazawako Line between Morioka and Ōmagari was converted to standard gauge and connecting ramp was constructed at Morioka linking to the Tōhoku Shinkansen, completed in December 1996.

Following level-crossing problems that emerged after the opening of the Yamagata Shinkansen, 33 grade crossings (including pedestrian crossings) along the line were eliminated ahead of the Akita Shinkansen's opening. As standard-gauge conversion progressed, all station buildings along the line were rebuilt, with the exception of Kakunodate Station which had been recently renovated, and a Shinkansen maintenance facility and storage tracks were constructed at the Minamiakita Depot (now the Akita Shinkansen Car Center).

The segment between Morioka and Akita began operating on 22 March 1997 with five-car E3 series trains, with formations lengthened to six cars in 1998.

All services were suspended on 11 March 2011 following the 2011 Tōhoku earthquake and tsunami, with partial operation resuming between Morioka and Akita from 18 March, although through services to the Tōhoku Shinkansen did not initially operate. Through services to Tokyo were restored on 29 April 2011, coinciding with the full reopening of the Tōhoku Shinkansen.

E6 series trains were introduced on Super Komachi services from 16 March 2013, operating at up to 300 kilometres per hour (190 mph) on the Tōhoku Shinkansen, and from 15 March 2014 all Komachi services were operated by E6 series sets, running at up to 320 km/h (200 mph) on the Tōhoku Shinkansen.

Services between Ōmagari and Akita were suspended from 22 to 29 July 2017 due to flooding after heavy rainfall. Services north of Nasushiobara Station were suspended on 13 February 2021 following the 2021 Fukushima earthquake.

On 6 March 2025, following the uncoupling of Hayabusa–Komachi 21 near Nishi-Nippori Station, coupled operations with Hayabusa services were suspended until further notice, and passengers travelling between Tokyo and Akita were advised to transfer at Morioka Station.

== Operations ==
Services consist of Komachi trains which are 7-car E6 series mini-shinkansen sets coupled with E5 series Hayabusa trains for the portion of the journey between Tokyo and Morioka.

The Komachi services run at a maximum speed of 320 km/h (200 mph) on the Tohoku Shinkansen, and between Morioka and Akita, run as 7-car independent trains with a maximum speed of 130 km/h (80 mph). However, 110 km/h (70 mph) is more typical for the line through the hills east of Akita, with trains frequently slowing to 90 km/h (55 mph) for curves such as those south of Ugo. The line from Morioka to Akita is prone to deep snow.

The fastest timetabled journey between Akita and Tokyo currently takes 3 hours and 37 minutes calling at four or five stops in between.

=== Rolling stock ===
As of March 2020, the following types are used on Akita Shinkansen services.

- E6 series 7-car sets, since 16 March 2013

==== Former rolling stock ====
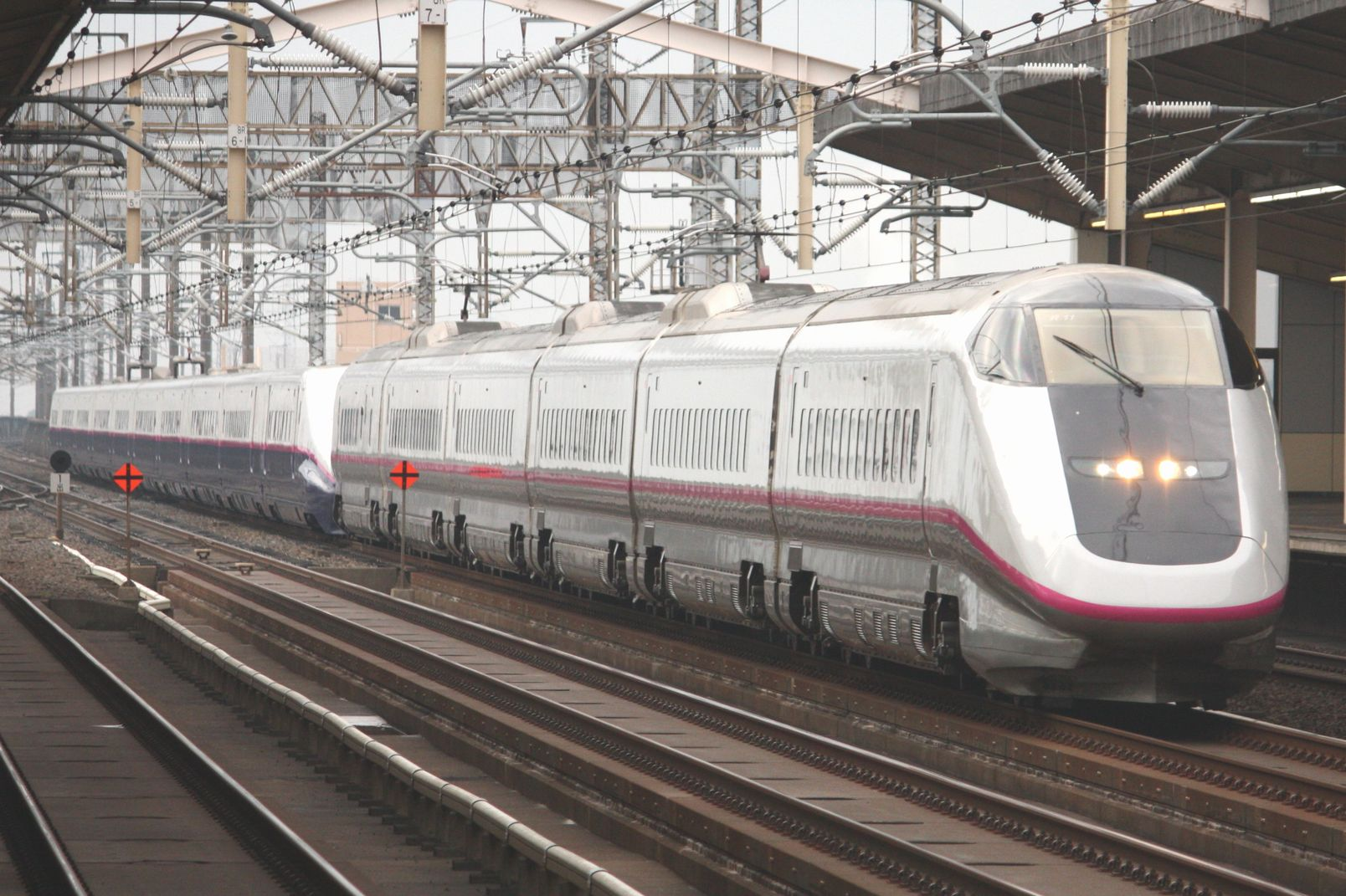
An E3 Series coupled with an E2 Series at Oyama Station

- E3 series 6-car sets (originally 5-car sets) withdrawn by 15 March 2014

==== Non-revenue-earning-types ====
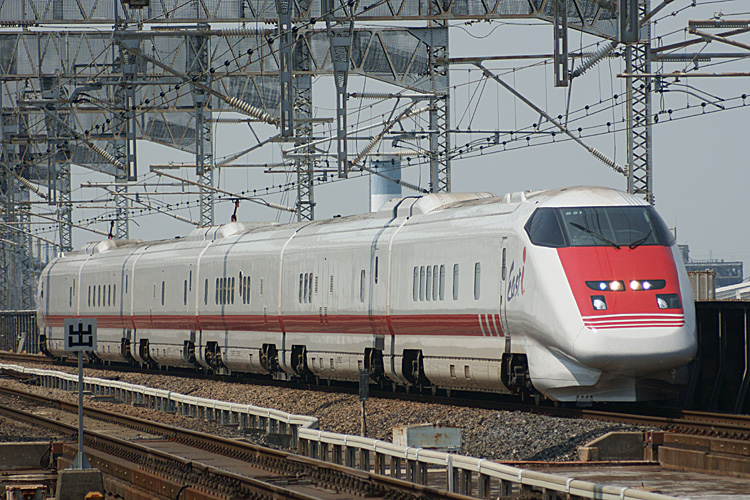
E926 East i train at Omiya Station, May 2001

- East i (E926)

=== Stations ===
Between Tokyo and Morioka, the stations are the same as the Hayabusa service on the Tōhoku Shinkansen. Between Morioka and Akita, the stations are as shown below.

Legend:

●	All trains stop
▲	Some trains stop

Station	Distance in km (mi) from		Komachi	Transfers	Location	
Station	Tokyo	Morioka	Komachi	Transfers	Location	
↑ Through service to/from Tokyo via the Tōhoku Shinkansen ↑
Morioka 盛岡	535.3 (332.6)	0 (0)	●	Tōhoku Shinkansen (for Shin-Aomori and Shin-Hakodate-Hokuto); ■ Tōhoku Main Line; ■ Tazawako Line; ■ Yamada Line; ■ Iwate Galaxy Railway Line	Morioka	Iwate; Prefecture
Shizukuishi 雫石	552.9 (343.6)	16.0 (9.9)	▲	■ Tazawako Line	Shizukuishi	Iwate; Prefecture
Tazawako 田沢湖	579.4 (360.0)	40.1 (24.9)	▲	■ Tazawako Line	Senboku	Akita; Prefecture
Kakunodate 角館	600.0 (372.8)	58.8 (36.5)	▲	■ Tazawako Line; ■ Akita Nairiku Line	Senboku	Akita; Prefecture
Ōmagari 大曲	618.5 (384.3)	75.6 (47.0)	●	■ Ōu Main Line; ■ Tazawako Line	Daisen	Akita; Prefecture
Akita 秋田	670.2 (416.4)	127.3 (79.1)	●	■ Ōu Main Line; ■ Uetsu Main Line; ■ Oga Line	Akita	Akita; Prefecture
