= Tazawako Station =

Railway station in Semboku, Akita Prefecture, Japan

Coordinates: 39°42′1″N 140°43′20.7″E

Tazawako Station 田沢湖駅
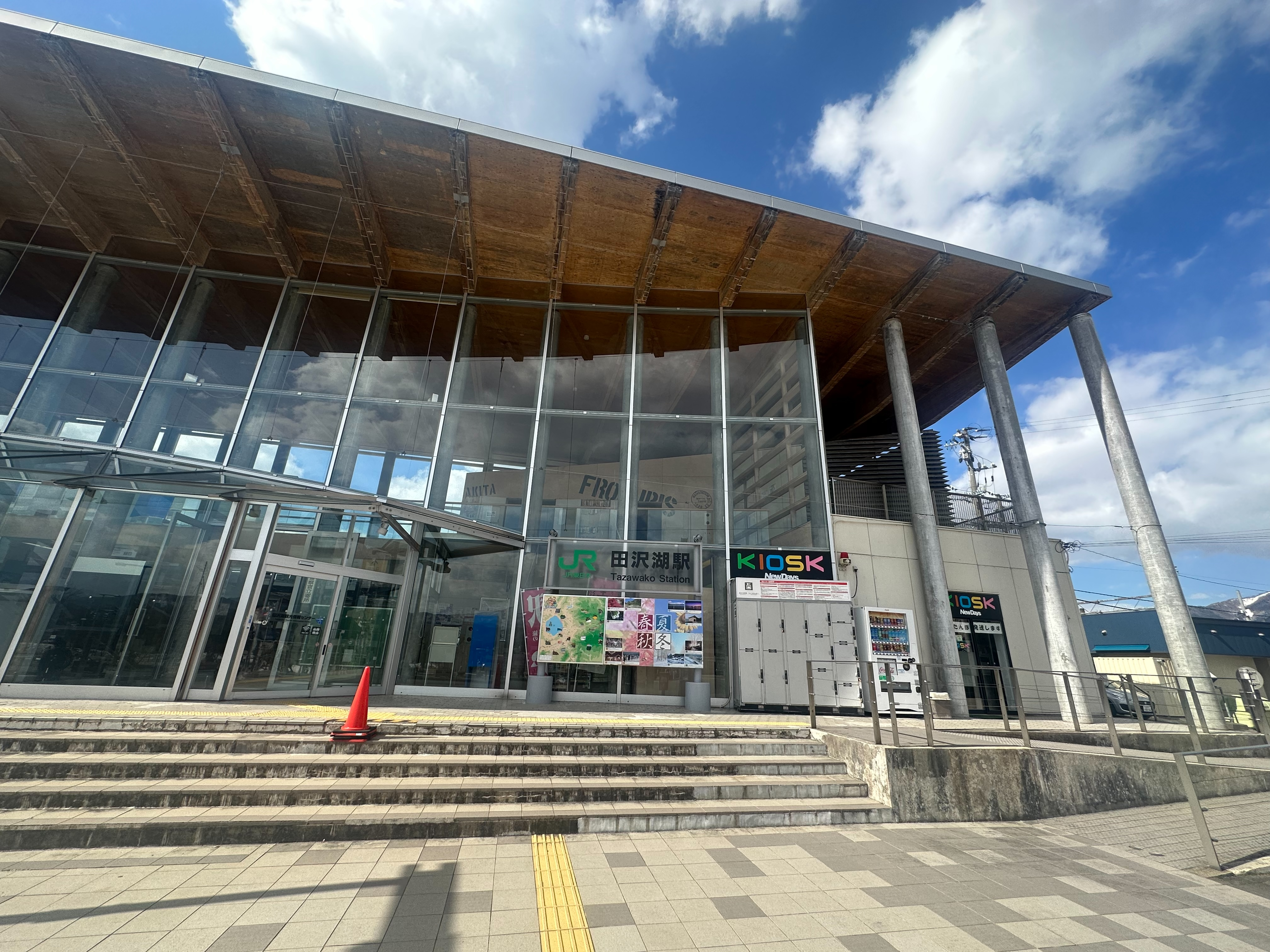
- Tazawako Station in March 2024

Japanese name
- Shinjitai: 田沢湖駅
- Kyūjitai: 田澤湖驛
- Hiragana: たざわこえき

General information
- Location: 68 Danzaka, Tazawako Obonai, Semboku City; Akita Prefecture; Japan
- Operator: JR East
- Lines: Akita Shinkansen; Tazawako Line
- Platforms: 1 side + 1 island platform
- Tracks: 3

Construction
- Structure type: At grade

Other information
- Status: Staffed (Talking reserved seat ticket vending machine installed)

History
- Opened: 31 August 1923; 102 years ago
- Former names: Obonai (until 1966)

Passengers
- FY2012: 346 daily

Services
Preceding station	JR East	Following station
Kakunodate towards Akita	Akita Shinkansen Komachi	Shizukuishi towards Tokyo
Sashimaki towards Ōmagari	Tazawako Line	Akabuchi towards Morioka
Location
- Location within Akita Prefecture Location within Tohoku, Japan Location within Japan

Tazawako Station (田沢湖駅, Tazawako-eki) is a railway station on the Tazawako Line in Semboku, Akita, Japan, operated by East Japan Railway Company (JR East).

== Lines ==
Tazawako Station is served by the Tazawako Line and the Akita Shinkansen, and is located 40.1 rail km from the terminus of both lines at Morioka Station.

== Station layout ==
Tazawako Station consists of a single side platform and an island platform. The station building, by architect Shigeru Ban, with its glass facade, received the Good Design Prize. Tazawako Station was selected to be one of the Hundred Stations of Tohoku.

=== Platforms ===
1	■ Tazawako Line	for Akita
1	■ Akita Shinkansen	for Akita
2	■ Tazawako Line	for Morioka
2	■ Akita Shinkansen	for Morioka
3	■ Tazawako Line	for bidirectional traffic

== History ==
Tazawako Station opened on August 31, 1923, as Obonai Station (生保内駅) on the Japanese Government Railways, which became Japanese National Railways (JNR) after World War II. The station was renamed to its present name on October 1, 1966. The station was absorbed into the JR East network upon the privatization of JNR on April 1, 1987. Services on the Akita Shinkansen began on March 22, 1997.

== Surrounding area ==
- Nyūtō hot spring village
- Lake Tazawa
- Semboku City Hall
- Sashimaki moor
