= Iizume Station =

Railway station in Misato, Akita Prefecture, Japan

Iizume Station 飯詰駅
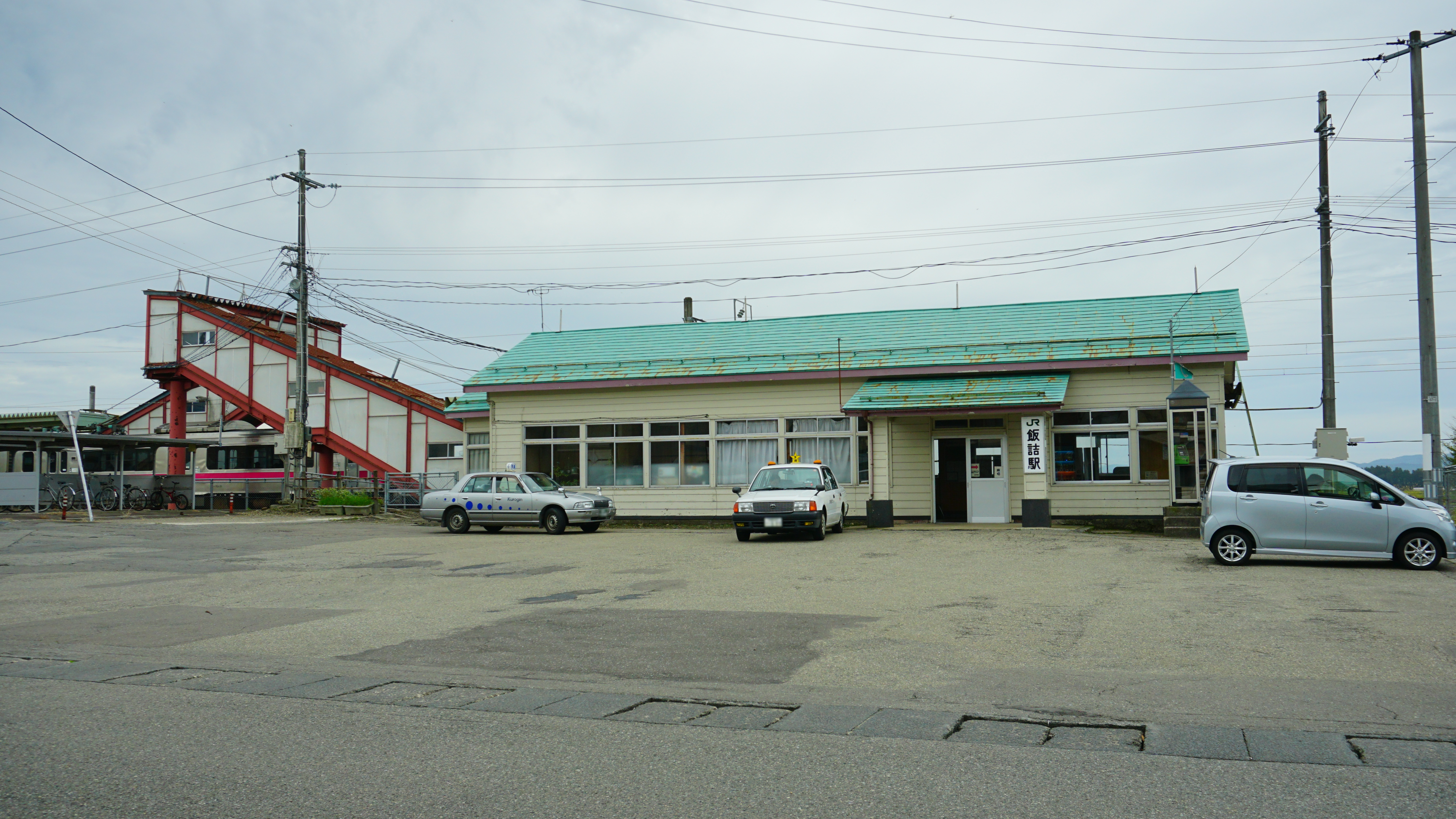
- Iizume Station (October 2019)

General information
- Location: 78, Yachinaka-78 Kamifukai, Misato-cho, Senboku-gun, Akita-ken 019-1236; Japan
- Coordinates: 39°24′22″N 140°30′55″E
- Operator: JR East
- Line: ■ Ōu Main Line
- Distance: 239.8 kilometers from Fukushima
- Platforms: 1 island platform

Other information
- Status: Staffed
- Website: Official website

History
- Opened: June 15, 1905

Passengers
- FY2018: 133

Services
Preceding station	JR East	Following station
Yokote One-way operation	Ōu Main Line Rapid	Ōmagari towards Aomori
Gosannen towards Shinjō	Ōu Main Line Local	Ōmagari towards Aomori
Location
- Location within Akita Prefecture Location within Japan

Iizume Station (飯詰駅, Iizume-eki) is a railway station in the town of Misato, Akita Prefecture, Japan, operated by JR East.

== Lines ==
Misato Station is served by the Ōu Main Line, and is located 239.8 km from the terminus of the line at Fukushima Station.

== Station layout ==
The station consists of a single island platform connected to the station building by a footbridge. The station is staffed.

=== Platforms ===
1	■ Ōu Main Line	for Shinjō and Yamagata
2	■ Ōu Main Line	for Akita and Ōmagari

== History ==
Iizume Station opened on June 15, 1905 as a station on the Japanese Government Railways (JGR), serving the village of Iizume. The JGR became the Japan National Railways (JNR) after World War II. The station was absorbed into the JR East network upon the privatization of the JNR on April 1, 1987.

== Passenger statistics ==
In fiscal 2018, the station was used by an average of 133 passengers daily (boarding passengers only).

== Surrounding area ==
- National Route 13

== See also ==
- List of railway stations in Japan
