= Komachi (train) =

Japanese high-speed Shinkansen train service

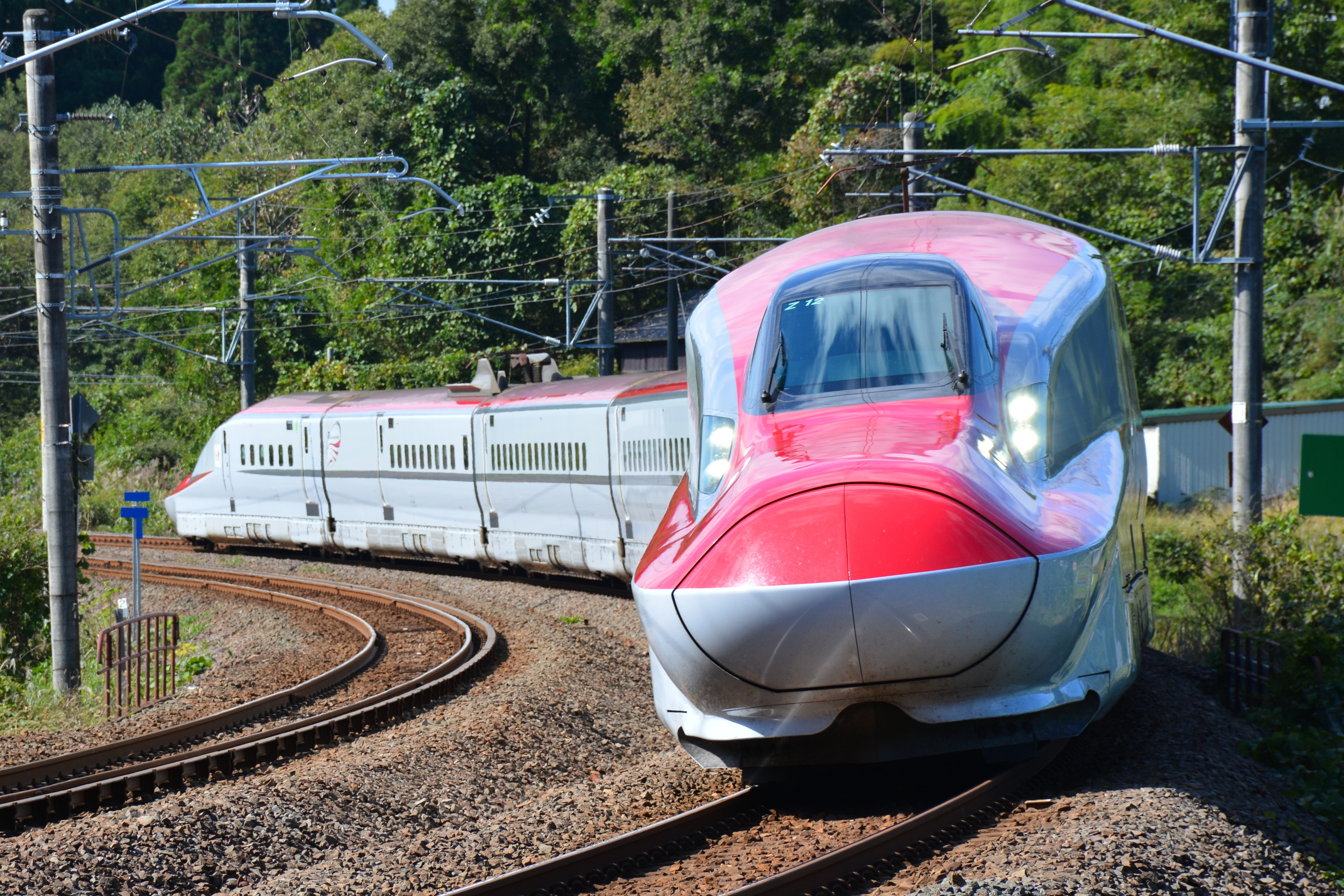
- E6 series set operating a Komachi service, October 2016

Overview
- Service type: Shinkansen
- Status: Operational
- Locale: Honshu, Japan
- First service: 22 March 1997
- Current operator: JR East

Route
- Termini: Tokyo; Akita
- Distance travelled: 670.2 km (416.4 mi)
- Average journey time: 3 hours, 37 minutes
- Service frequency: Hourly
- Lines used: Tōhoku Shinkansen; Akita Shinkansen

On-board services
- Classes: Ordinary, Green
- Catering facilities: Trolley service

Technical
- Rolling stock: E6 series
- Track gauge: 1,435 mm (4 ft 8 1/2 in) standard gauge
- Electrification: Overhead line: 25 kV 50 Hz AC on Tohoku Shinkansen; 20 kV 50 Hz AC on Akita Shinkansen
- Operating speed: 320 km/h (200 mph) on Tohoku Shinkansen; 130 km/h (80 mph) on Akita Shinkansen

The Komachi (Japanese: こまち) is an express high-speed Shinkansen service operated by East Japan Railway Company (JR East) between Tokyo and Akita in Japan since March 1997. It is the only Shinkansen service that runs on the Akita Shinkansen, and uses E6 series trains. Between Tokyo and Morioka, it is typically coupled to a Hayabusa service train to travel over the Tōhoku Shinkansen. After Morioka, the Komachi service continues along standard gauge tracks that were converted from narrow gauge. Because it then runs on tracks that have grade crossings, its maximum speed from Morioka to Akita is 130 kilometres per hour (80 mph), compared to 320 km/h (200 mph) on the Tohoku Shinkansen.

The Komachi service was named after a famous poet from the area, Ono no Komachi, whose name (小町) is also synonymous with "belle" or "beauty" in Japanese.

== Station stops ==
Komachi services stop at the following stations on the Akita Shinkansen between Morioka and Akita. For details of station stops between Tokyo and Morioka, see the Hayabusa articles.

- Morioka
- Shizukuishi*
- Tazawako*
- Kakunodate*
- Ōmagari
- Akita

(*) Not served by all trains.

== Train formations ==
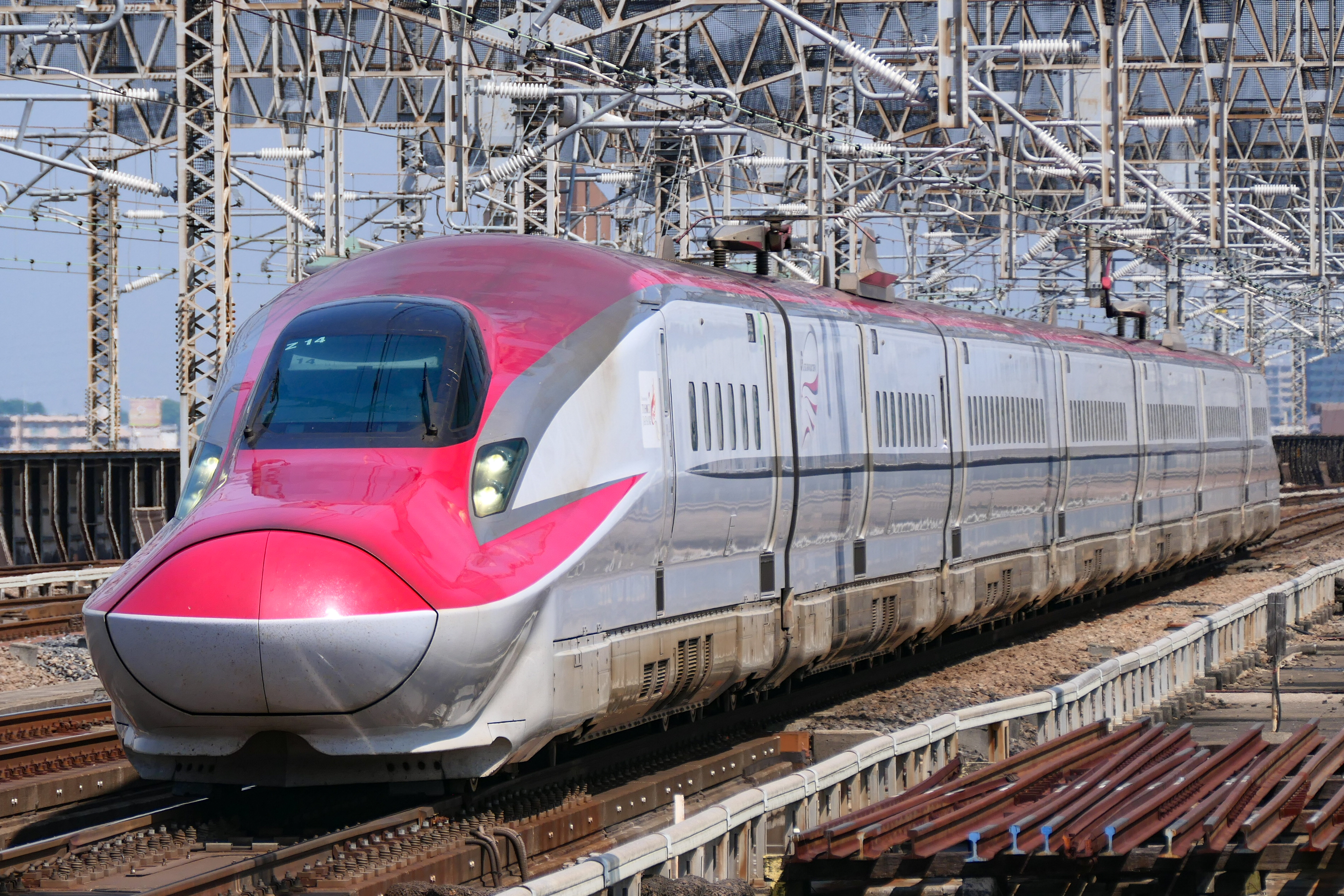
An E6 series set, May 2022

Since 15 March 2014, most Komachi services have operated by seven-car E6 series trainsets with running at a maximum speed of 320 km/h (200 mph) on the Tohoku Shinkansen coupled to E5 series Hayabusa trainsets. Car 11, the "Green" (first class) car, is at the Tokyo end. All seats are reserved and no-smoking.

Car No.	11	12	13	14	15	16	17
Class	Green	Ordinary	Ordinary	Ordinary	Ordinary	Ordinary	Ordinary
Facilities	Wheelchair space	Wheelchair space / Cardphone				Cardphone	

=== E3 series ===
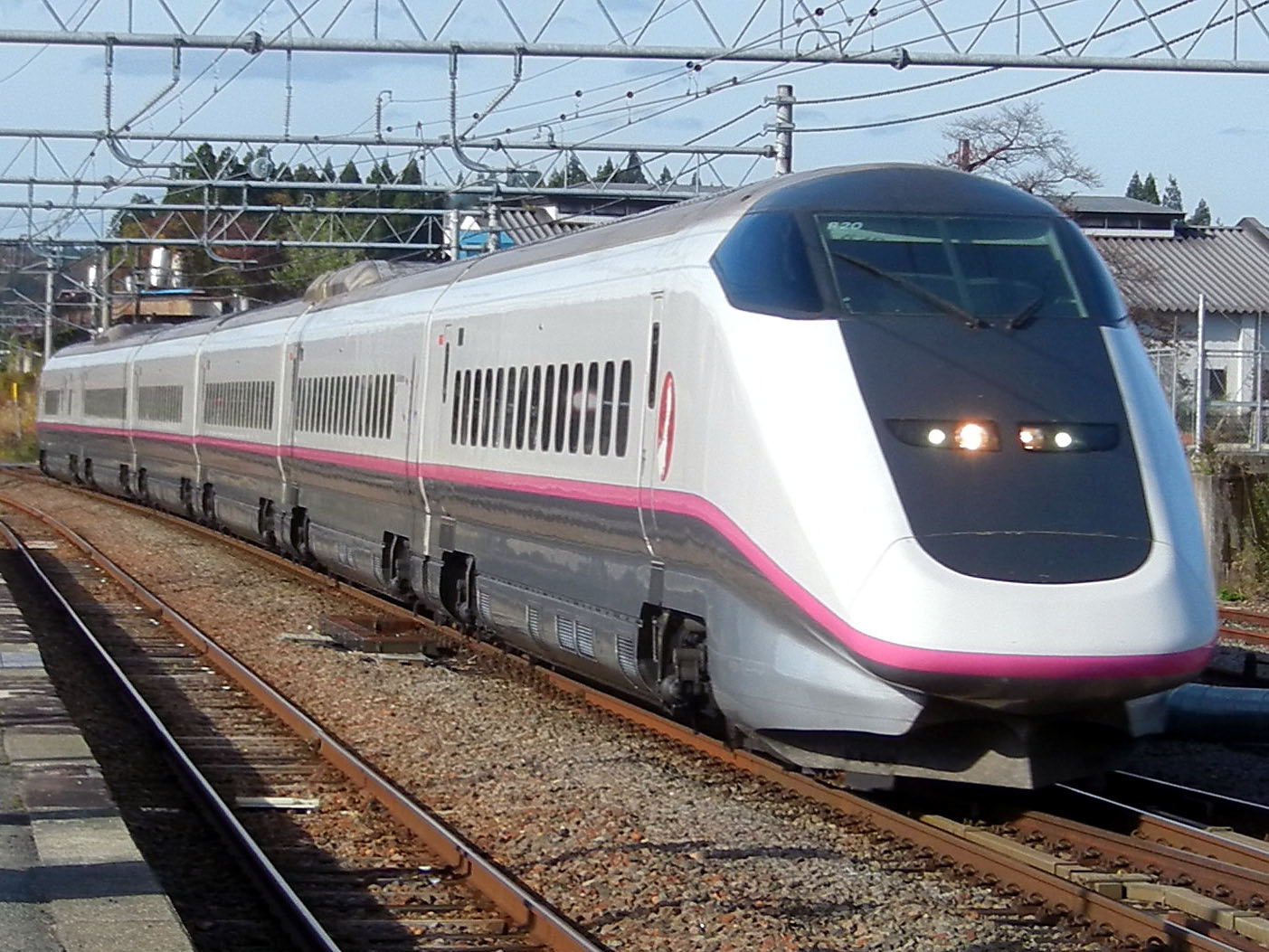
A six-car E3 series set on a Komachi service, November 2013

Komachi services were also operated by five-car E3 series trainsets (later augmented to six cars). These sets were formed as shown below, with car 11, the "Green" (first class) car, at the Tokyo end. All seats were reserved and no-smoking.

Car No.	11	12	13	14	15	16
Class	Green	Ordinary	Ordinary	Ordinary	Ordinary	Ordinary
Facilities	Wheelchair space	Wheelchair space	Cardphone		Cardphone	

== Accommodation ==
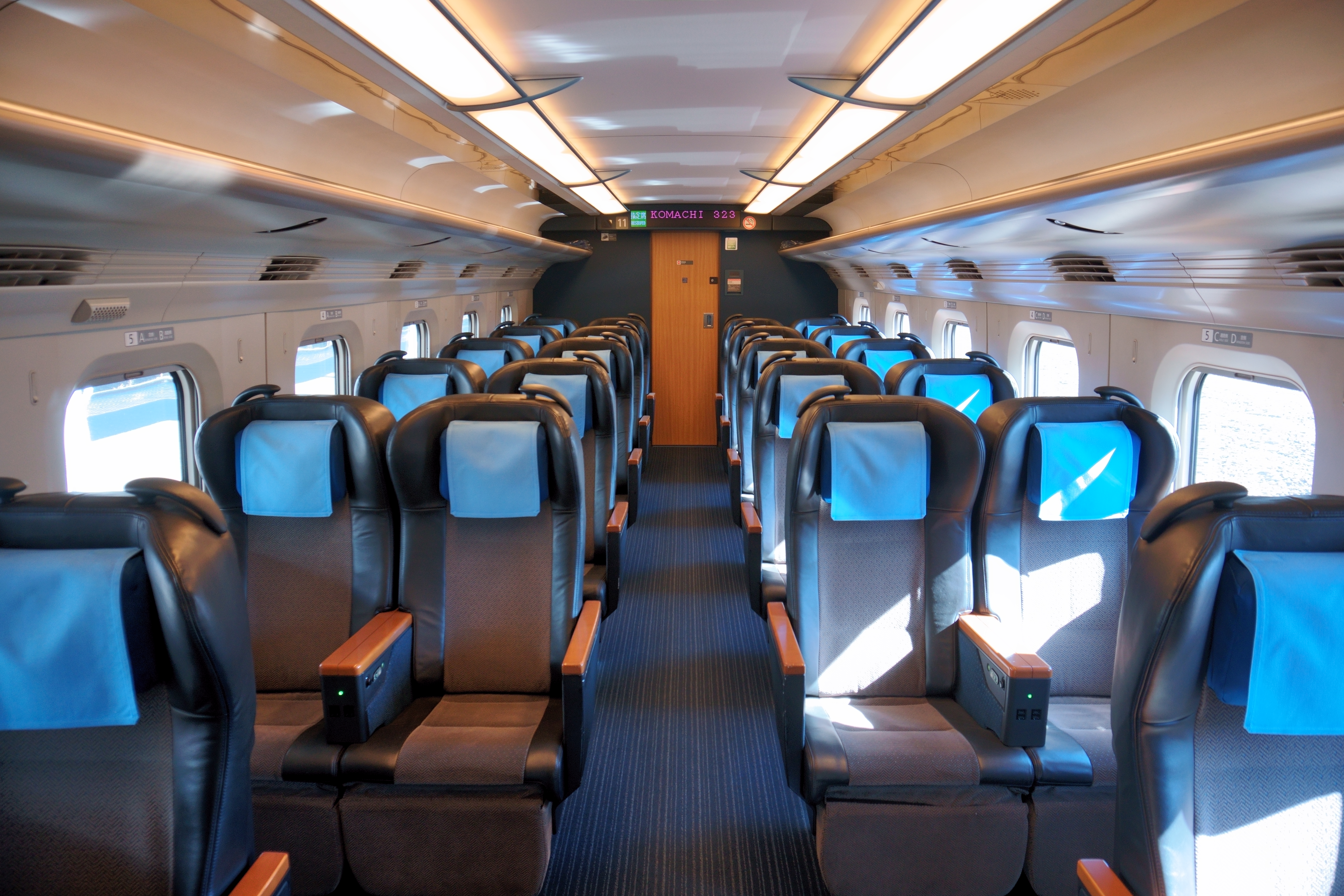
E6 series Green class car interior with 2+2 seating

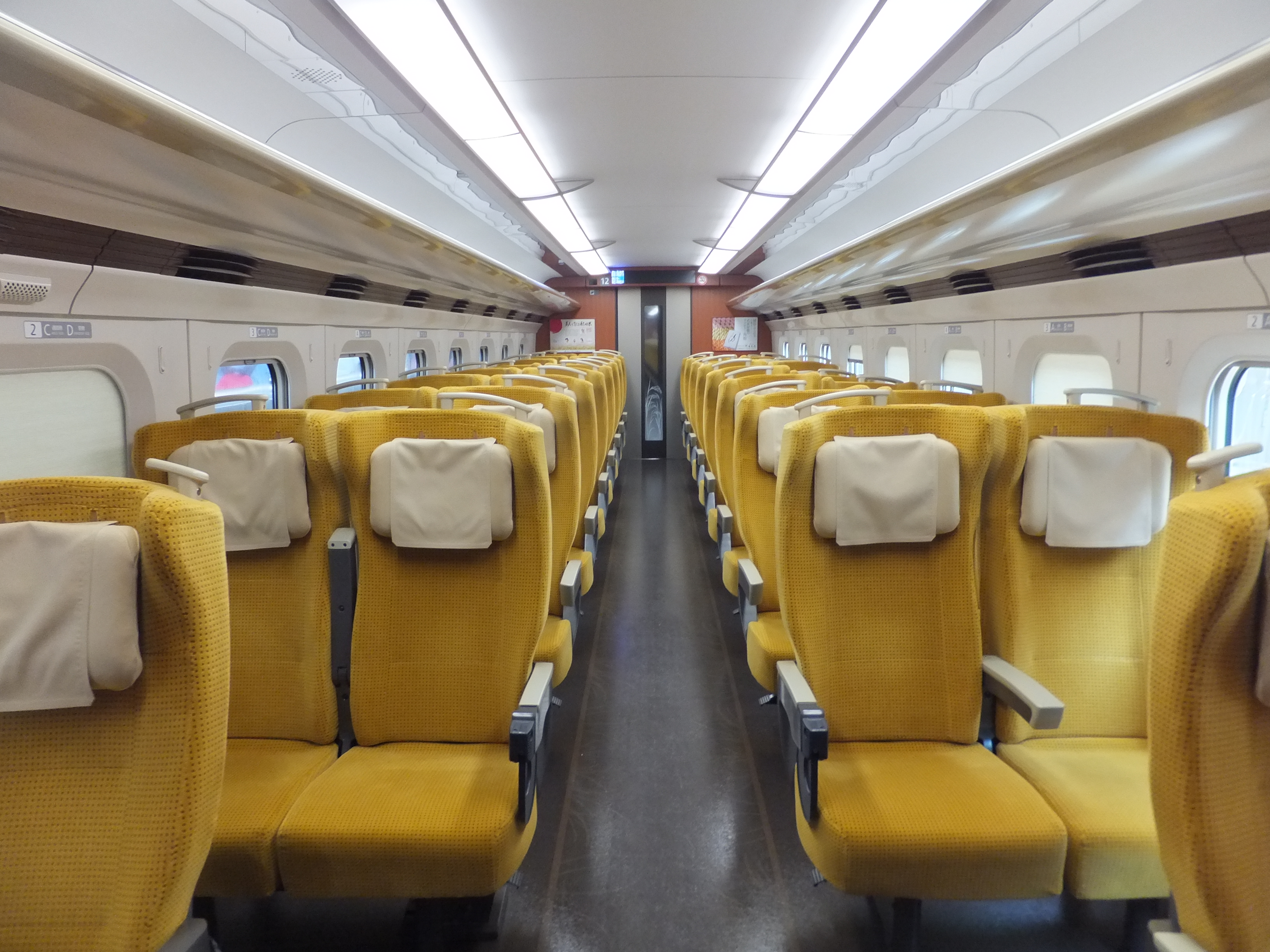
E6 series ordinary class car interior with 2+2 seating

== History ==
Komachi services began on the newly opened Akita Shinkansen line from the start of the revised timetable on 22 March 1997 using a fleet of 16 new 5-car E3 series trains running at a maximum speed of 275 km/h (170 mph) on the Tohoku Shinkansen. The name Komachi was officially announced in July 1996. Services initially consisted of 13 return workings daily between Tokyo and Akita, and one return working between Sendai and Akita. Most trains ran coupled with 200 series Yamabiko trainsets between Tokyo and Morioka, but three return workings ran coupled with newly introduced E2 series sets, running at a maximum speed of 275 km/h (170 mph) between Utsunomiya and Morioka, and giving a fastest journey time of 3 hours 49 minutes between Tokyo and Akita (an average speed of 163.4 km/h). The train services proved popular, and from the December 1998 timetable revision, an addition return working was added, and the E3 series trains were lengthened to six cars each. From the December 1999 timetable, all Komachi services ran together with E2 series Yamabiko trains, allowing overall journey times to be reduced, with a typical journey time of 4 hours 4 minutes.

From 16 March 2013, new Super Komachi (スーパーこまち) services started, using new E6 series trains running at a maximum speed of 300 km/h (185 mph) on the Tohoku Shinkansen. Initially, a fleet of four trains was used to operate four return services daily between Tokyo and Akita. The fastest journey time was reduced to 3 hours 45 minutes, 5 minutes faster than the fastest previous Komachi services. From the start of the revised timetable on 15 March 2014, all services were operated by E6 series trains, and the name was returned to simply Komachi. At the same time, the maximum speed on the Tohoku Shinkansen (on the section between Utsunomiya and Morioka) was further raised to 320 km/h (200 mph).

== See also ==
- Akita Relay, a temporary limited express service that operated to Akita while the Akita Shinkansen was being constructed
- List of named passenger trains of Japan
