= Shizukuishi =

Shizukuishi 雫石町
- Town
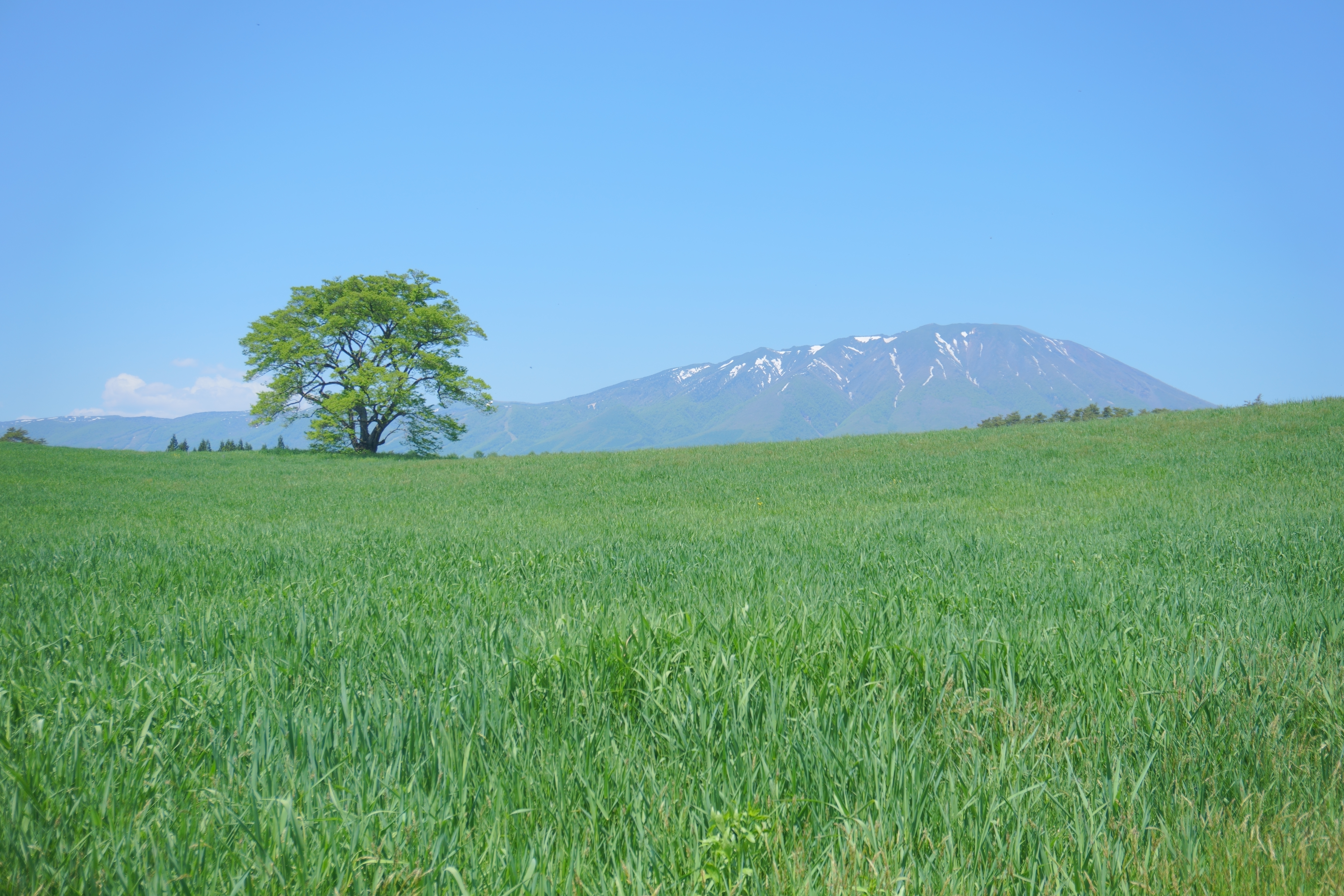
- View of Mount Iwate from Koiwai farm park

- Flag Seal

- Location of Shizukuishi in Iwate Prefecture

- Coordinates: 39°41′42.7″N 140°58′32.8″E
- Country: Japan
- Region: Tōhoku
- Prefecture: Iwate
- District: Iwate

Government
  - -Mayor: Masamitsu Fukaya (since October 2010)

Area
  - Total: 608.82 km^{2} (235.07 sq mi)

Population (March 31, 2020)
  - Total: 16,263
  - Density: 26.712/km^{2} (69.185/sq mi)
- Time zone: UTC+9 (Japan Standard Time)
- Phone number: 019-692-2111
- Address: 5-1 Senkarita, Shizukuishi-chō, Iwate-gun, Iwate-ken 029-0595
- Climate: Dfa
- Website: Official website
- Symbols
- Bird: Uguisu
- Flower: Chrysanthemum
- Tree: Sugi

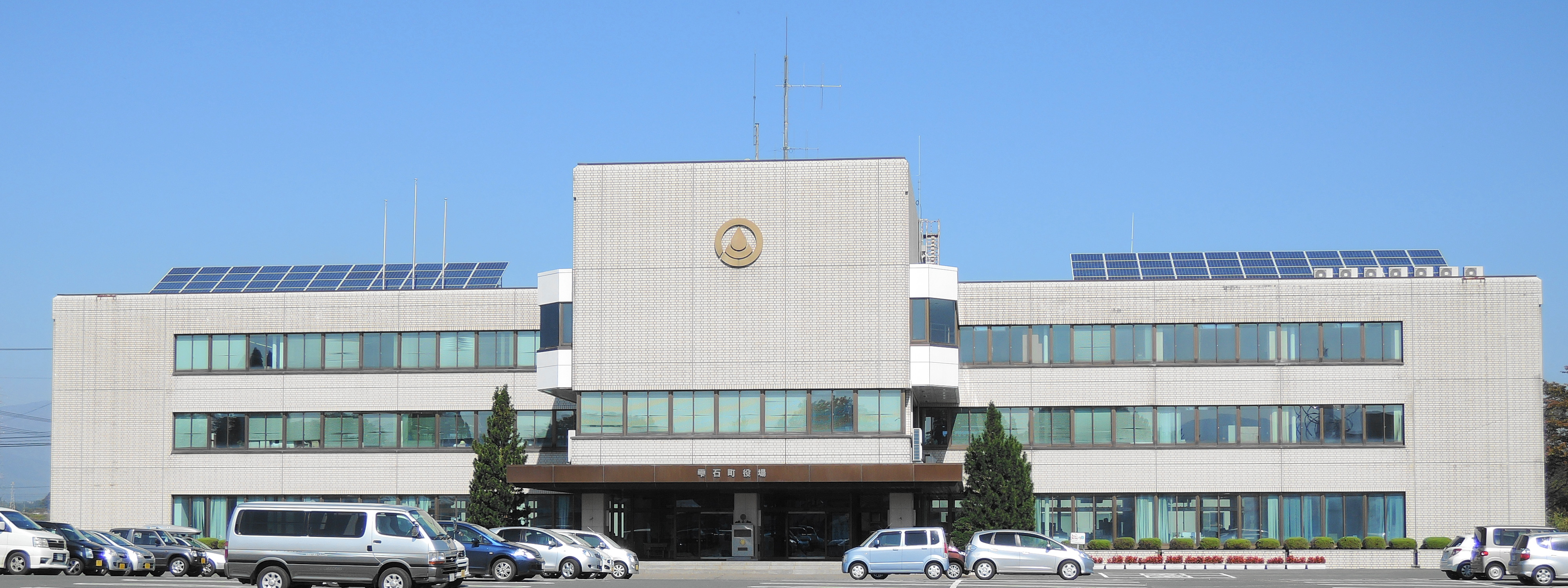
Shizukuishi town hall

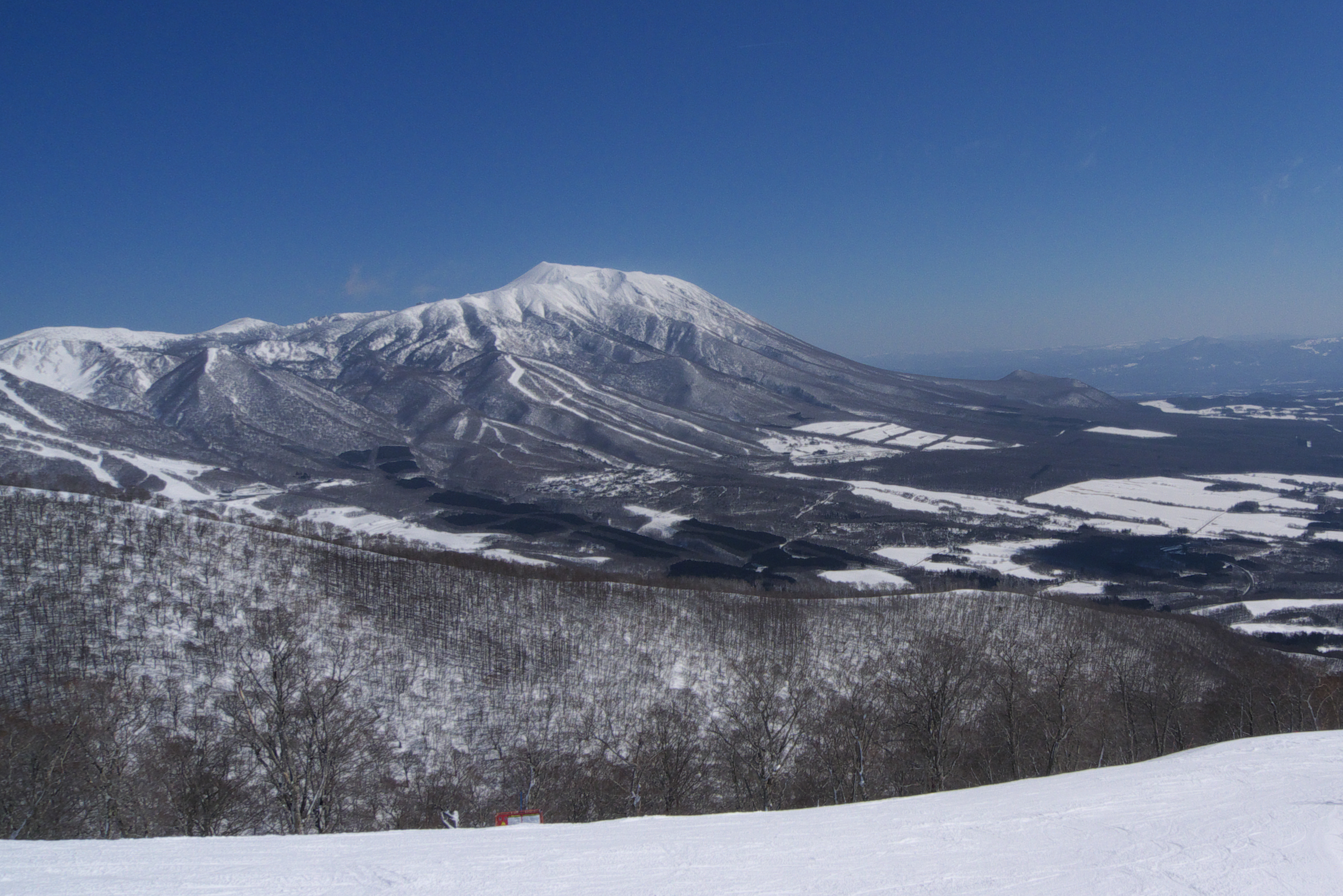
Mount Iwate and Mount Kurakake from Shizukuishi Ski Area

Shizukuishi (雫石町, Shizukuishi-chō) is a town located in Iwate Prefecture, Japan. As of 31 March 2020, the town had an estimated population of 16,263 in 6354 households, and a population density of 27 persons per km^{2}. The total area of the town is 608.82 square kilometres (235.07 sq mi).

== Geography ==
Shizukuishi is located in the Ōu Mountains of west-central Iwate Prefecture, bordering Akita Prefecture to the west. Mount Iwate (2038 m), an active volcano, lies just to the north of Shizukuishi and dominates the landscape. The Ōu Mountains form the boundary to the west as well with Akita Komagatake, another active volcano, just across the border in Akita Prefecture. The downtown area is located where the Shizukuishi and Kakkonda Rivers meet. Gosho Lake was created in 1981 with the completion of Gosho Dam.

=== Neighboring municipalities ===
Akita Prefecture

- Semboku

Iwate Prefecture

- Hachimantai
- Hanamaki
- Morioka
- Nishiwaga
- Shiwa
- Takizawa
- Yahaba

=== Climate ===
Shizukuishi has a cold humid continental climate (Köppen Dfa) characterized by mild summers and cold winters with heavy snowfall. The average annual temperature in Shizukuishi is 9.2 °C. The average annual rainfall is 1469 mm, with September as the wettest month and February as the driest month. The temperatures are highest on average in August, at around 23.2 °C, and lowest in January, at around -3.7 °C.

Climate data for Shizukuishi (altitude 195m, 1991−2020 normals, extremes 1976−present)
Month	Jan	Feb	Mar	Apr	May	Jun	Jul	Aug	Sep	Oct	Nov	Dec	Year
Record high °C (°F)	11.9 (53.4)	12.7 (54.9)	19.4 (66.9)	28.5 (83.3)	32.9 (91.2)	32.6 (90.7)	35.1 (95.2)	35.8 (96.4)	33.4 (92.1)	27.8 (82.0)	21.4 (70.5)	14.7 (58.5)	35.8 (96.4)
Mean daily maximum °C (°F)	0.8 (33.4)	1.7 (35.1)	5.6 (42.1)	13.5 (56.3)	19.1 (66.4)	23.0 (73.4)	25.9 (78.6)	27.7 (81.9)	23.2 (73.8)	17.1 (62.8)	10.0 (50.0)	3.7 (38.7)	14.3 (57.7)
Daily mean °C (°F)	−2.9 (26.8)	−2.3 (27.9)	1.1 (34.0)	7.7 (45.9)	13.3 (55.9)	17.8 (64.0)	21.3 (70.3)	22.6 (72.7)	17.9 (64.2)	11.2 (52.2)	5.0 (41.0)	0.1 (32.2)	9.4 (48.9)
Mean daily minimum °C (°F)	−7.3 (18.9)	−6.9 (19.6)	−3.4 (25.9)	1.9 (35.4)	7.5 (45.5)	13.2 (55.8)	17.4 (63.3)	18.5 (65.3)	13.4 (56.1)	5.9 (42.6)	0.4 (32.7)	−3.6 (25.5)	4.8 (40.6)
Record low °C (°F)	−20.6 (−5.1)	−20.3 (−4.5)	−15.7 (3.7)	−10.3 (13.5)	−1.5 (29.3)	3.6 (38.5)	7.6 (45.7)	8.7 (47.7)	1.4 (34.5)	−4.4 (24.1)	−10.8 (12.6)	−18.2 (−0.8)	−20.8 (−5.4)
Average precipitation mm (inches)	66.4 (2.61)	65.6 (2.58)	95.2 (3.75)	102.9 (4.05)	123.0 (4.84)	134.5 (5.30)	233.2 (9.18)	216.7 (8.53)	174.7 (6.88)	131.1 (5.16)	114.7 (4.52)	95.6 (3.76)	1,551 (61.06)
Average snowfall cm (inches)	154 (61)	130 (51)	90 (35)	4 (1.6)	0 (0)	0 (0)	0 (0)	0 (0)	0 (0)	0 (0)	9 (3.5)	93 (37)	480 (189)
Average rainy days	12.3	11.0	13.3	12.2	12.0	10.1	14.0	12.4	12.6	12.7	14.8	13.4	150.8
Average snowy days	17.2	15.6	10.3	0.5	0	0	0	0	0	0	1.0	10.1	54.7
Mean monthly sunshine hours	82.6	91.3	132.3	167.0	182.4	162.8	130.1	140.8	121.8	130.5	102.0	80.4	1,531.8
Source 1: JMA
Source 2: JMA

== Demographics ==
Per Japanese census data, the population of Shizukuishi has declined since the year 2000.

Historical population
Year	Pop.	±%
1920	12,726	—
1930	14,213	+11.7%
1940	15,882	+11.7%
1950	18,626	+17.3%
1960	20,708	+11.2%
1970	17,954	−13.3%
1980	18,696	+4.1%
1990	19,013	+1.7%
2000	19,750	+3.9%
2010	18,038	−8.7%
2020	15,731	−12.8%

== History ==
The area of present-day Shizukuishi has been inhabited since the earliest times. Archaeologists have found remains dating to the Japanese Paleolithic period. The area come under the control of the imperial dynasty during the early Heian period under the campaigns of Sakanoue no Tamuramaro, and was part of ancient Mutsu Province. The area was a battlefield during the Former Nine Years War and the Gosannen War. It eventually came under the control of the Nambu clan, who ruled from Morioka Domain under the Edo period Tokugawa shogunate.

In the Meiji period, the villages of Shizukuishi, Gosho, Nishiyama and Omyojin within Minami-Iwate District were created on April 1, 1889, with the establishment of the modern municipalities system. Kita-Iwate District and Minami-Iwate Districts merged to form Iwate District on March 29, 1896. Shizukuishi was raised to town status on December 23, 1940. On April 1, 1955, Shizukuishi merged with Gosho, Nishiyama and Omyojin, but lost a portion of its territory in a border adjustment with Morioka City on October 1 of the same year. The All Nippon Airways Flight 58 accident occurred over Shizukuishi on July 30, 1971.

== Government ==
Shizukuishi has a mayor-council form of government with a directly elected mayor and a unicameral town council of 16 members. Shizukuishi, together with the city of Takizawa, contributes three seats to the Iwate Prefectural legislature. In terms of national politics, the town is part of Iwate 2nd district of the lower house of the Diet of Japan.

== Economy ==
The local economy is based on agriculture, forestry and seasonal tourism. Koiwai Farm, based in Takizawa, is currently the largest privately owned dairy production center in Japan. The farm produces a full range of dairy products distributed throughout the nation.

== Education ==
Shizukuishi has five public elementary schools and one public middle school operated by the town government, and one public high school operated by the Iwate Prefectural Board of Education.

== Transportation ==
=== Railway ===
East Japan Railway Company (JR East) - Akita Shinkansen

- Shizukuishi

East Japan Railway Company (JR East) - Tazawako Line

- Shizukuishi - Harukiba - Akabuchi

=== Highway ===
- National Route 46

== Local attractions ==
- In winter, numerous ski resorts come to life. Due to the town's rural nature, low income and low population Yoshiaki Tsutsumi, Japan's richest man at the time, was able to build a large ski area and hotel without the kind of "organized opposition of environmentalists" which stymied his plans elsewhere in Japan.
- Koiwai Farm is a working dairy and tourist attraction. A number of the farm buildings have been named National Tangible Cultural Properties. The farm has been used as a shooting location for television dramas and movies. Every year Koiwai Farm puts on the Koiwai Snow Festival (小岩井雪祭, Koiwai Yuki Matsuri). This festival is noteworthy for its giant snow sculptures.
- The town is known for its annual hemp festival every year in August which draws "crowds of sightseers".
