= Shizukuishi Station =

Railway station in Shizukuishi, Iwate Prefecture, Japan

Shizukuishi Station 雫石駅
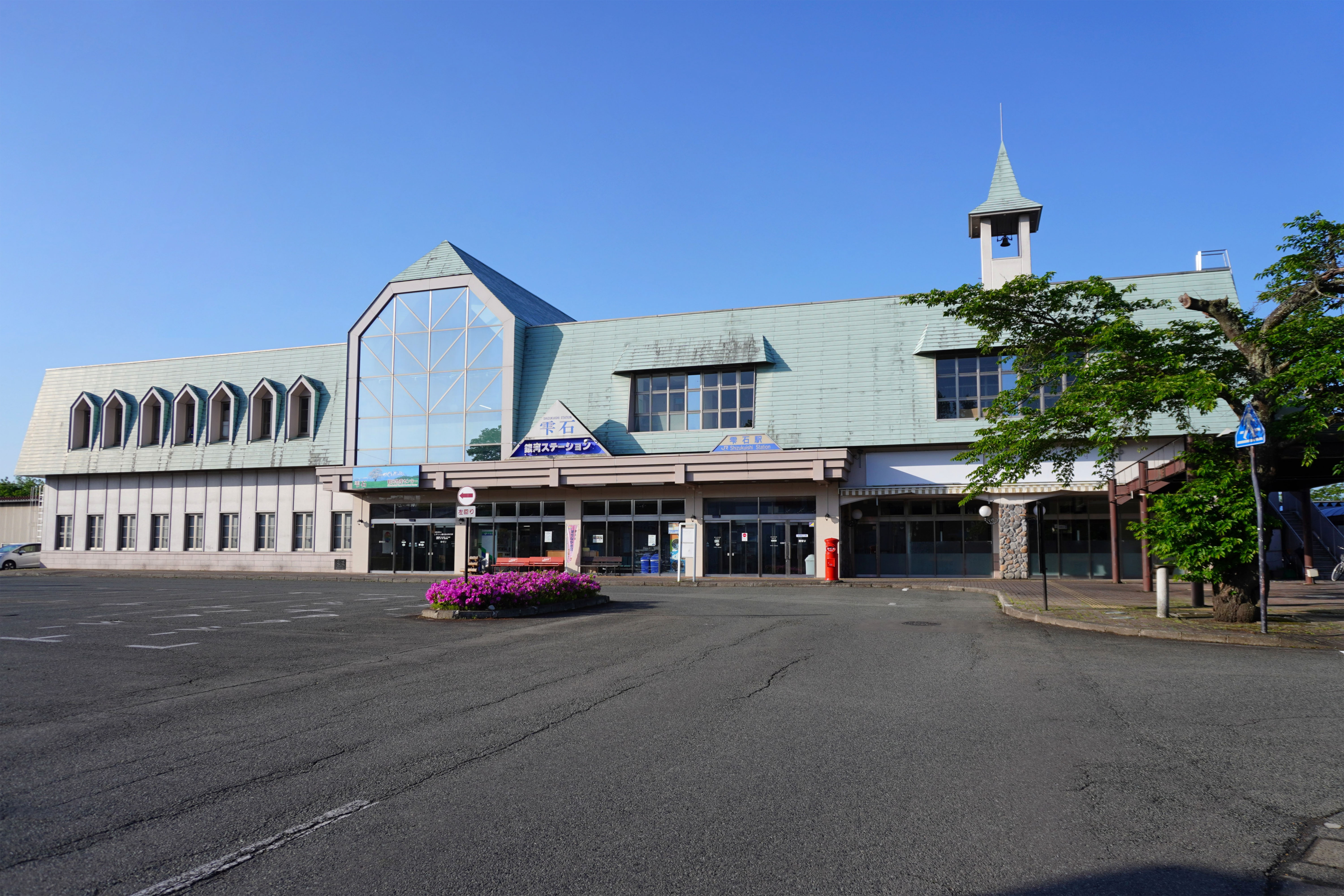
- Shizukuishi Station in May 2024

General information
- Location: 46-3 Teranoshita, Shizukuishi Town, Iwate District, Iwate Prefecture 020-0524; Japan
- Coordinates: 39°41′21.7″N 140°58′29.5″E
- Operator: JR East
- Lines: Akita Shinkansen; Tazawako Line
- Distance: 16.0 km (9.9 mi) from Morioka
- Platforms: 1 side + island platform
- Tracks: 2

Construction
- Structure type: Elevated

Other information
- Status: Staffed ( Midori no Madoguchi )
- Website: Official website

History
- Opened: 15 June 1921; 105 years ago

Passengers
- FY2015: 549

Services
Preceding station	JR East	Following station
Tazawako towards Akita	Akita Shinkansen Komachi	Morioka towards Tokyo
Harukiba towards Ōmagari	Tazawako Line	Koiwai towards Morioka
Location
- Location within Iwate Prefecture Location within Japan

Shizukuishi Station (雫石駅, Shizukuishi-eki) is a railway station on the Tazawako Line in the town of Shizukuishi, Iwate Prefecture, Japan, operated by East Japan Railway Company (JR East).

== Lines ==
Shizukuishi Station is served by the Tazawako Line and the Akita Shinkansen, and is located 16.0 km from the terminus of both lines at Morioka Station.

== Station layout ==
Shizukuishi Station is an elevated station with a single side platform and an island platform. The station has a Midori no Madoguchi staffed ticket office.

=== Platforms ===
1	■ Tazawako Line	for Tazawako, Ōmagari; Morioka
1	■ Akita Shinkansen	Morioka, Sendai, Tokyo for Ōmagari, Akita
2	■ Tazawako Line	for Morioka
2	■ Akita Shinkansen	for Ōmagari, Akita
3	■ Tazawako Line	for Tazawako, Kakunodate, Ōmagari for Morioka

== History ==
Shizukuishi Station opened on June 15, 1921. The station was absorbed into the JR East network upon the privatization of JNR on April 1, 1987. Services on the Akita Shinkansen began on March 22, 1997.

== Passenger statistics ==
In fiscal 2015, the station was used by an average of 549 passengers daily (boarding passengers only).

== Surrounding area ==
- Amihari ski resort and onsen
- Oushuku Onsen
- National Route 46

== See also ==
- List of railway stations in Japan
