= Morioka Station =

Railway station in Morioka, Iwate Prefecture, Japan

Morioka Station 盛岡駅
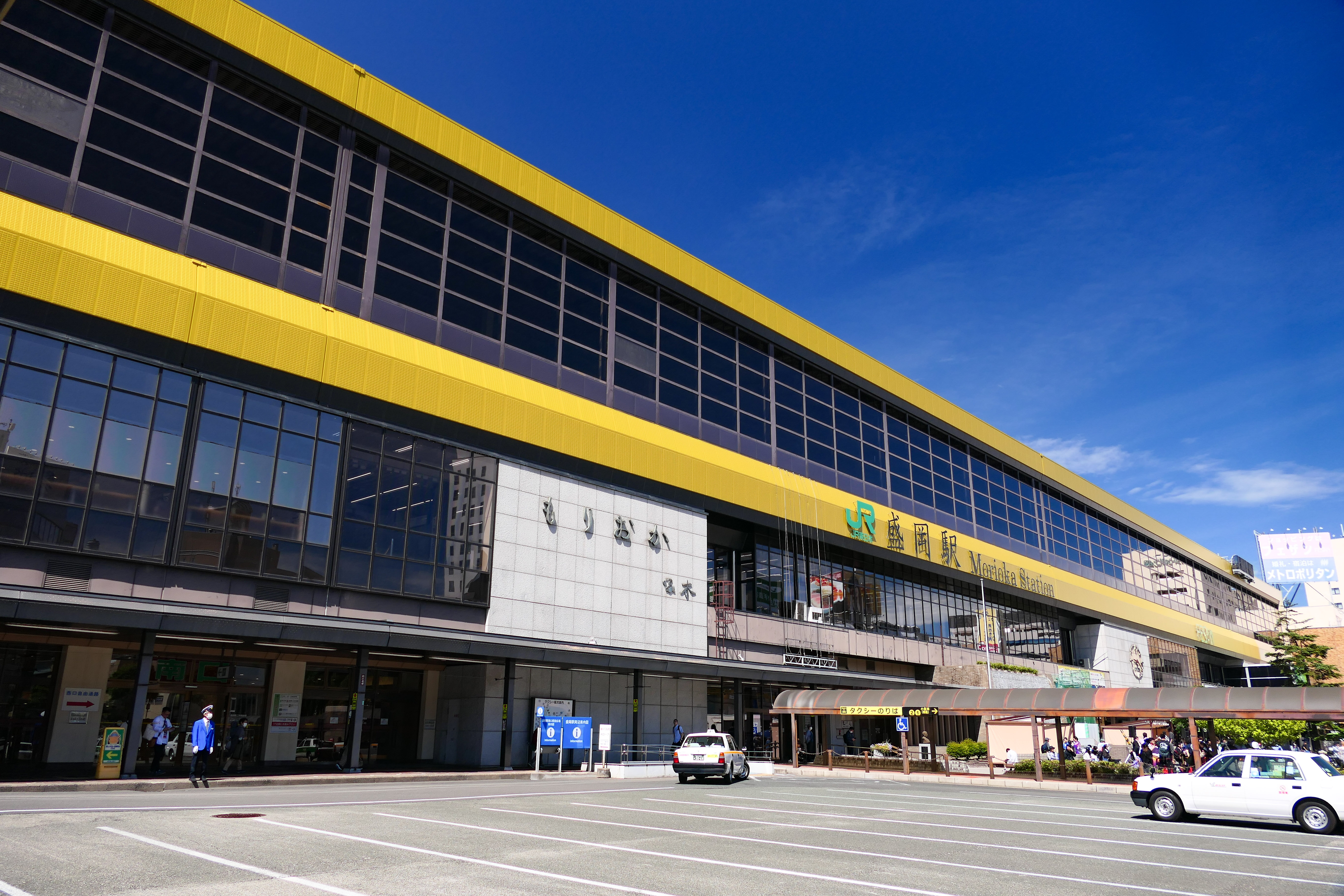
- Morioka Station east entrance in May 2024

General information
- Location: 1-48 Moriokaekimae-dori, Morioka City; Iwate Prefecture; Japan
- Coordinates: 39.701442°N 141.136379°E
- Operator: JR East; Iwate Galaxy Railway
- Lines: Akita Shinkansen; Tōhoku Shinkansen; Tōhoku Main Line; Yamada Line; Tazawako Line; Iwate Galaxy Railway Line
- Distance: 535.3 km (332.6 mi) from Tokyo
- Platforms: 7 island platforms
- Connections: Bus terminal

Construction
- Structure type: Elevated

Other information
- Status: Staffed (Midori no Madoguchi)

History
- Opened: November 1, 1890; 135 years ago

Passengers
- FY2015: JR East 17,784 (daily); IGR 3,257 (daily)

Services
Preceding station	JR East	Following station
Shin-Hanamaki towards Tokyo	Tōhoku Shinkansen Hayabusa	Iwate-Numakunai towards Shin-Aomori
Shin-Hanamaki towards Tokyo	Tōhoku Shinkansen Yamabiko	Terminus
Terminus	Tōhoku Shinkansen Hayate	Ninohe towards Shin-Aomori
Sendai towards Tokyo	Akita Shinkansen Komachi	Shizukuishi towards Akita
Senbokuchō One-way operation	Tōhoku Main Line Rapid Aterui	Terminus
Yahaba towards Hanamaki	Tōhoku Main Line Rapid Hamayuri	Terminus
Senbokuchō towards Kuroiso	Tōhoku Main Line Local	Terminus
Terminus	Yamada Line Rapid Rias; Local	Kamimorioka towards Miyako
Maegata towards Ōmagari	Tazawako Line	Terminus
Terminus	Hanawa Line	Aoyama towards Ōdate
Preceding station	Iwate Galaxy Railway	Following station
Terminus	Iwate Galaxy Railway Line	Aoyama towards Metoki
Location
- Location within Iwate Prefecture Location within Japan

Morioka Station (Japanese: 盛岡駅, Japanese pronunciation: [Morioka-eki]) is a major railway station in Morioka, Iwate Prefecture, Japan. It is operated by JR East.

== Lines ==
Morioka Station is a major junction station, and is where the Akita Shinkansen splits off from the Tōhoku Shinkansen. It is located 535.3 km (332.6 mi) from Tokyo Station. Local JR East services are provided by the Tohoku Main Line, Tazawako Line and Yamada Line, all of which terminate at Morioka Station. The station is also the southern terminus of the third-sector Iwate Galaxy Railway Line.

== Station layout ==
The station has three elevated island platforms for Shinkansen services, and four island platforms for local services. The station has a Midori no Madoguchi staffed ticket office.

=== Platforms ===
0/1	■ Iwate Galaxy Railway Line	for Iwate-Numakunai and Ninohe
	■ Hanawa Line	for Araya-Shinmachi and Kazuno-Hanawa
2	■ Tōhoku Main Line	for Hanamaki, Kitakami and Ichinoseki
	■ Yamada Line	for Moichi and Miyako
	■ Iwate Galaxy Railway Line	for Iwate-Numakunai (JR Line through operation
3	■ Tōhoku Main Line	for Hanamaki, Kitakami and Ichinoseki
	■ Iwate Galaxy Railway Line	for Iwate-Numakunai (JR Line through operation
4/5	■ Tōhoku Main Line	for Hanamaki, Kitakami and Ichinoseki
6	■ Tōhoku Main Line	for Hanamaki, Kitakami and Ichinoseki
	■ Yamada Line	for Moichi and Miyako
7	■ Tōhoku Main Line	for Hanamaki, Kitakami and Ichinoseki
8/9	■ Tazawako Line	for Shizukuishi and Ōmagari
11/12	■ Tohoku Shinkansen	for Sendai and Tokyo
12/13	■ Tohoku Shinkansen	for Sendai and Tokyo (Departure)
14	■ Tohoku Shinkansen	for Ninohe, Hachinohe, Shin-Aomori and Shin-Hakodate-Hokuto
	■ Akita Shinkansen	for Ōmagari and Akita

== History ==
The station was opened on November 1, 1890, by Japan's first private railway company, Nippon Railway. The line was nationalized in 1906. Services on the Tazawako Line started in 1921, on the Yamada line in 1923, the Tohoku Shinkansen in 1982 and the Akita Shinkansen in 1997. The station was absorbed into the JR East network upon the privatization of the Japanese National Railways (JNR) on 1 April 1987.

== Passenger statistics ==
In fiscal 2015, the JR East portion of the station was used by an average of 17,784 passengers daily (boarding passengers only). The Iwate Galaxy Railway portion of the station was used by an average of 3,257 passengers daily.

== Surrounding area ==
=== East exit ===
- Morioka Station building "Fezan"
- Moriokaekimae Post office
- JR East Morioka branch office
- JR bus Tōhoku Morioka branch office

=== West exit ===
- Iwate Asahi Television Co., Ltd.

== Connecting bus routes ==
=== Local ===
- JR Bus Tōhoku
  - For Kuji Station via Iwate-Numakunai Station and Kuzumaki
  - For Iwaizumi via Hayasaka-Kōgen
- Iwate-Kenhoku Bus
  - For Miyako Station ("Route 106 Express Bus")
  - For Iwate-Funakoshi Station via Miyako Station ("Route 106 Express Bus")
  - For Numakunai via Kuriyagawa Station and Iwate-Shibutami
- Iwate Kenkotsu Bus
  - For Ōfunato via Setamai
  - For Hanamaki Airport

=== Long-distance (Highway bus) ===
Departs from the west exit

- For Aomori Station via Kosaka ("Asunaro")
- For Hirosaki Bus Terminai via Tohoku-Ōwani ("Yodel")
- For Hachinohe Rapia via Kunohe ("Hassei")
- For Sendai Station ("Urban")
- For Karumai or Ōno ("Win day")
- For Lake Towada ("Towadako")
- For Tamachi Station (Tokyo) via Tokyo Station ("Iwate Kizuna")

Departs from the east exit

- For Ōdate Station via Kazuno-Hanawa Station ("Michinoku")
- For Jōboji or Ninohe Station ("Super Yūyū")
- For Tokyo Station via Ikebukuro Station ("Rakuchin", All reserved seats)
- For Hon-Atsugi Station via Yokohama Station, Machida Station

== See also ==
- List of railway stations in Japan
