= Ōmagari Station (Akita) =

Railway station in Daisen, Akita Prefecture, Japan

Ōmagari Station 大曲駅
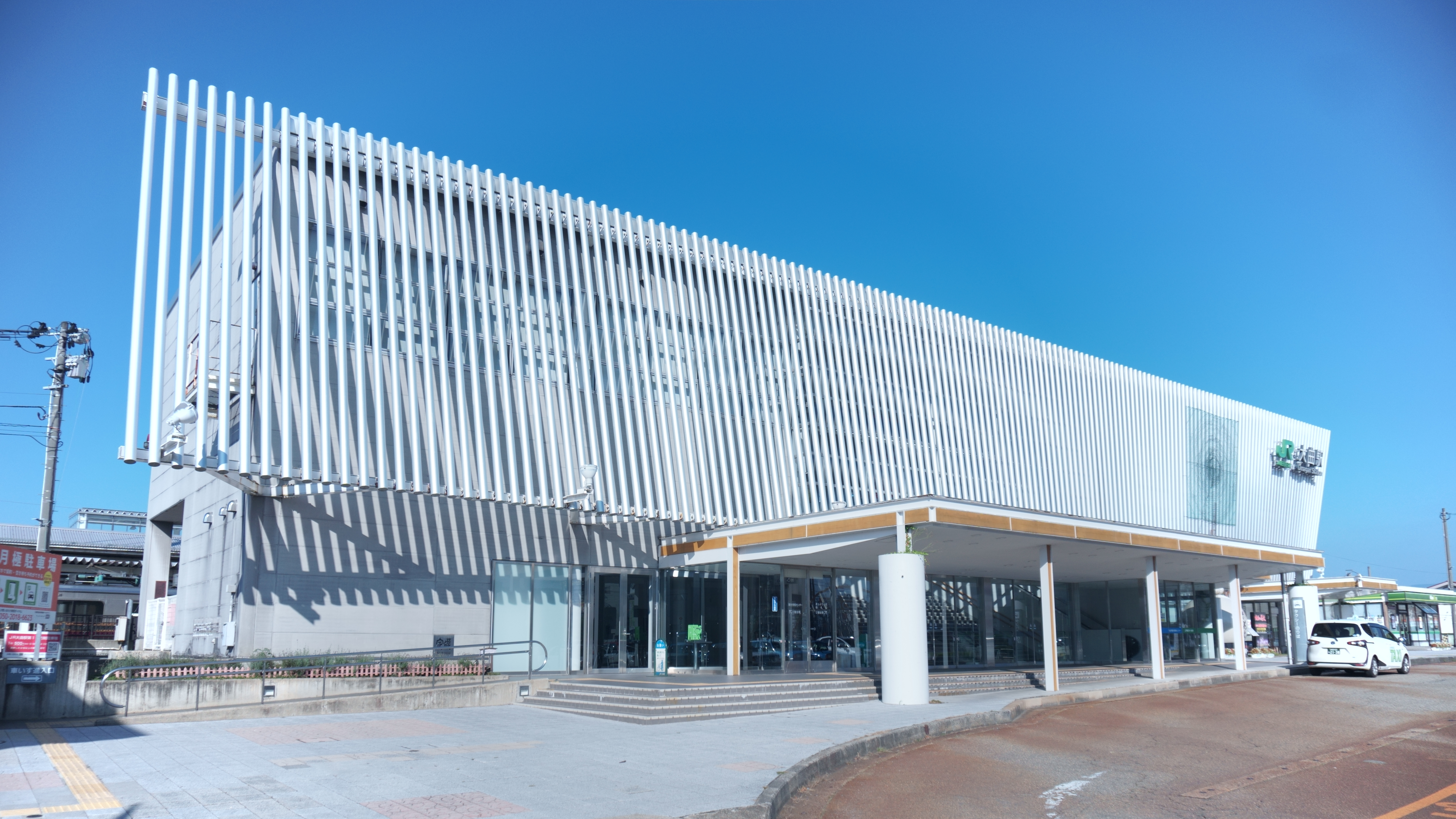
- Ōmagari Station in July 2023

General information
- Location: 6-1 Ōmagari-Tōrimachi, Daisen-shi, Akita-ken 014-0027; Japan
- Coordinates: 39°27′55.5″N 140°28′46.7″E
- Operator: JR East
- Lines: Akita Shinkansen; Ōu Main Line; Tazawako Line
- Platforms: 1 side + 1 island + 1 bay platform

Other information
- Status: Staffed (Midori no Madoguchi)
- Website: www.jreast.co.jp/estation/station/info.aspx?StationCd=346

History
- Opened: 21 December 1904; 121 years ago

Passengers
- FY2018: 2,086 daily

Services
Preceding station	JR East	Following station
Reverses direction	Akita Shinkansen Komachi	Akita Terminus
Reverses direction	Akita Shinkansen Komachi	Kakunodate towards Tokyo
Iizume One-way operation	Ōu Main Line Rapid	Kariwano towards Aomori
Iizume towards Shinjō	Ōu Main Line Local	Jingūji towards Aomori
Terminus	Tazawako Line	Kita-Ōmagari towards Morioka
Location
- Location within Akita Prefecture Location within Japan

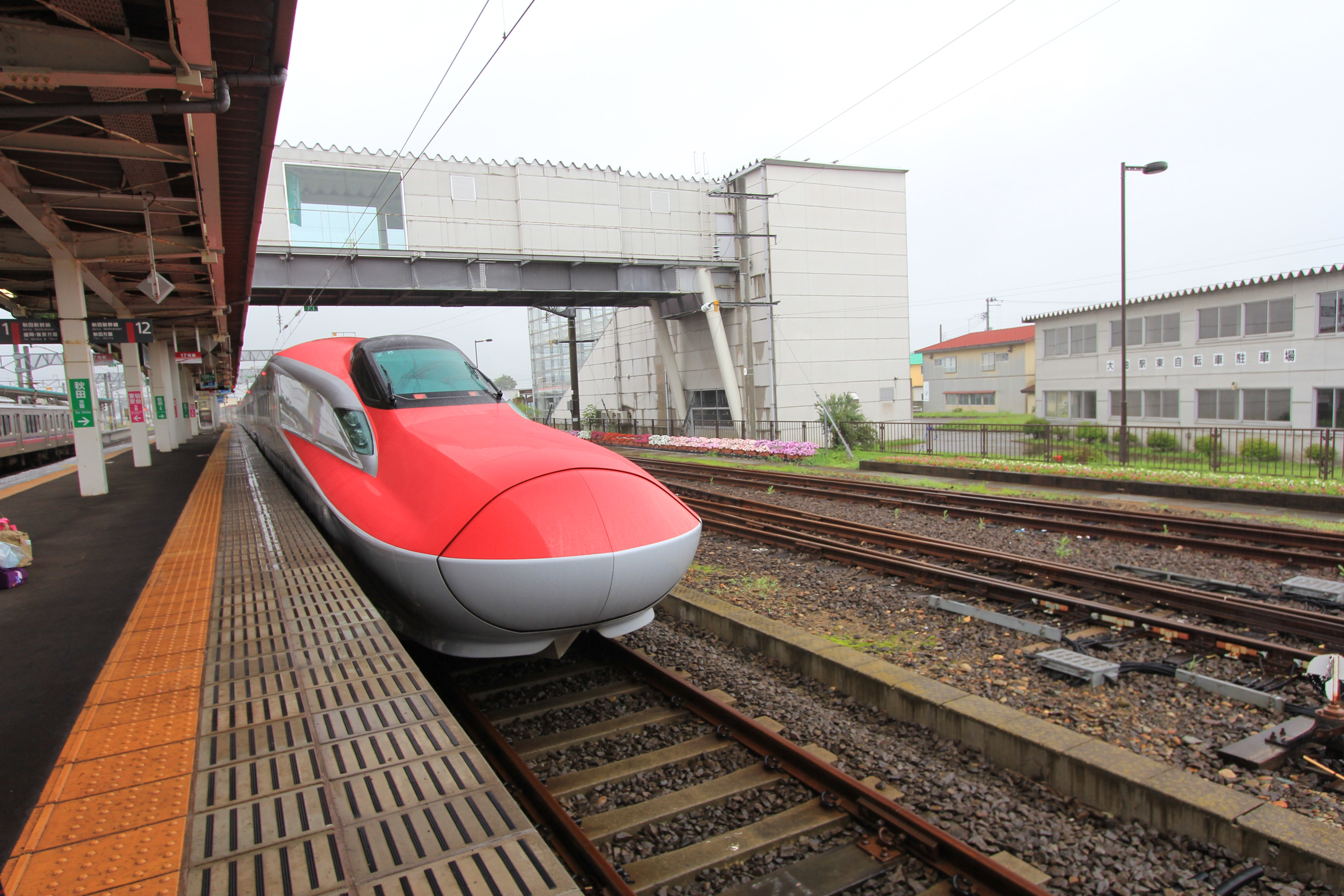
Akita Shinkansen at Ōmagari Station

Ōmagari Station (大曲駅, Ōmagari-eki) is a junction railway station in the city of Daisen, Akita Prefecture, Japan, operated by East Japan Railway Company (JR East).

== Lines ==
Ōmagari Station is served by the Ōu Main Line, Tazawako Line and Akita Shinkansen. It is located 240.7 km from the terminus of the Ōu Main Line at Fukushima Station and is 75.6 kilometers from the intermediate terminus of the Akita Shinkansen at Morioka Station. The station is also a terminal station for the Tazawako Line, and is 76.6 kilometers from the opposing terminal at Morioka Station.

== Station layout ==
Ōmagari Station has a side platform, island platform and bay platform serving a total of five tracks. Platforms 1 and 2 are for the Ōu Main Line, while trains using platforms 3, 11, and 12 reverse into and out of the station. The platforms are connected by a footbridge and the station has a Midori no Madoguchi staffed ticket office.

=== Platforms ===
1	■ Ōu Main Line	for Akita
2	■ Ōu Main Line	for Yokote and Yuzawa
3	■ Tazawako Line	for Kakunodate and Tazawako
11	■ Akita Shinkansen	for Morioka, Sendai and Tokyo
12	■ Akita Shinkansen	for Akita

== History ==
Ōmagari Station was opened on December 21, 1904 on the Japanese Government Railways (JGR) Ōu Main Line, serving the town of Ōmagari, Akita. The predecessor of the Tozawako Line, the Obonai keiben-sen, began operations from July 30, 1921, and was nationalized the following year. The JGR became the Japan National Railways (JNR) after World War II. The station was absorbed into the JR East network upon the privatization of the JNR on April 1, 1987. The Akita Shinkansen began operations from March 22, 1997 and a new station building was inaugurated on July 20 of the same year.

== Passenger statistics ==
In fiscal 2018, the station was used by an average of 2043 passengers daily (boarding passengers only).

== Surrounding area ==
- Ōmagari post office
- National Route 13
- National Route 105
