= Matsuba Station =

Railway station in Semboku, Akita Prefecture, Japan

Matsuba Station 松葉駅
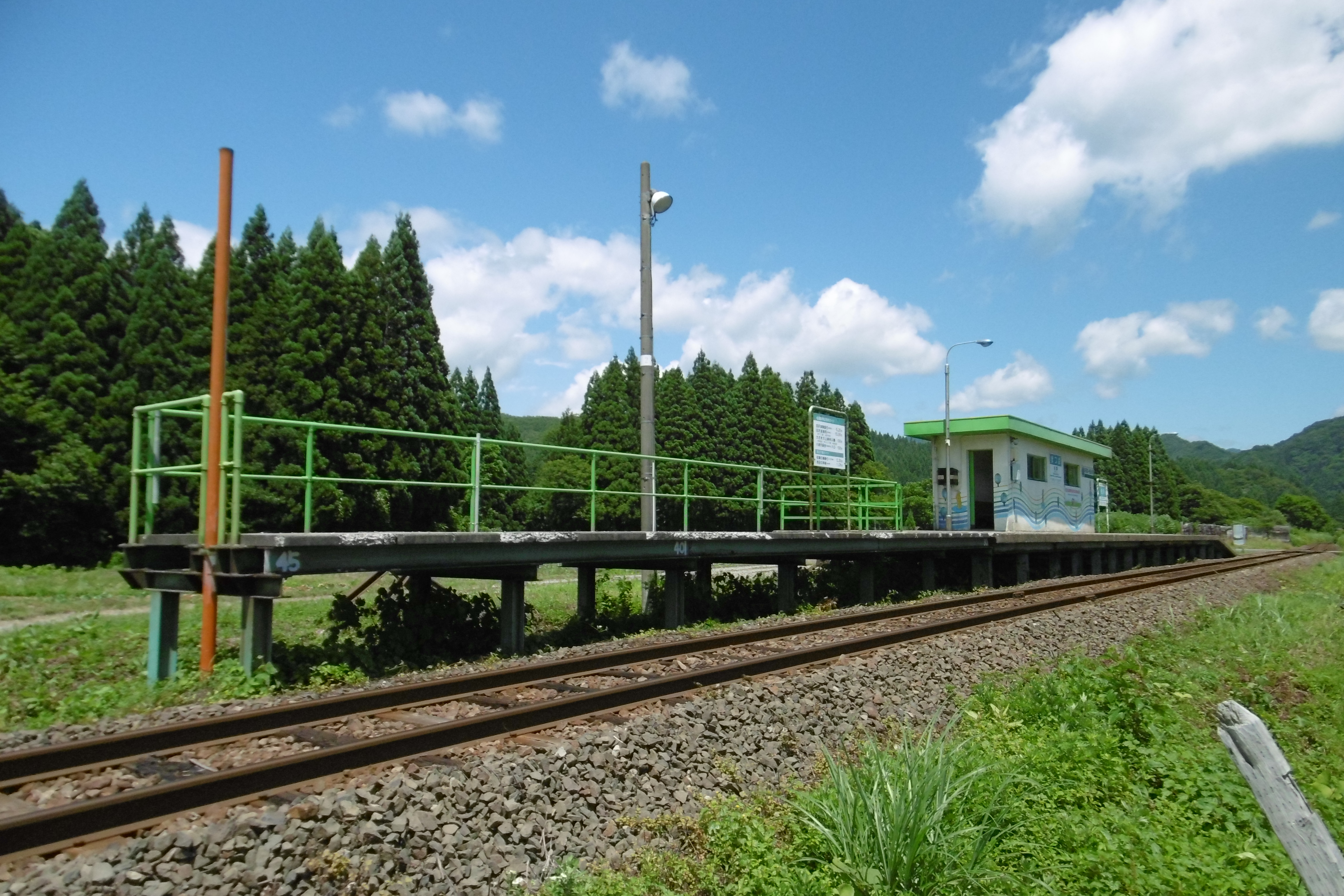
- Matsuba Station, July 2017

General information
- Location: Matsuba Nishikicho Hinokinai, Semboku-shi, Akita-ken 014-0602; Japan
- Coordinates: 39°44′38.82″N 140°35′25.11″E
- Operator: Akita Nariku Railway
- Line: ■ Nairiku Line
- Distance: 75.0 kilometers from Takanosu
- Platforms: 1 side platform

Other information
- Status: Unstaffed
- Website: Official website

History
- Opened: November 1, 1971
Location
- Location within Akita Prefecture Location within Japan

Matsuba Station (松葉駅, Matsuba-eki) is a railway station located in the city of Semboku, Akita Prefecture, Japan, operated by the third sector railway operator Akita Nairiku Jūkan Railway.

== Lines ==
Matsuba Station is served by the Nariku Line, and is located 75.0 km from the terminus of the line at Takanosu Station.

== Station layout ==
The station consists of one side platform serving a single bi-directional track. The station is unattended. There is no station building, but only a shelter built on the platform.

== Adjacent stations ==
«	Service	»
Akita Nairiku Jūkan Railway Akita Nairiku Line
Kami-Hinokinai	Express Moriyoshi	Saimyoji
Ugo-Nakazato	-	Ugo-Nagatoro

== History ==
Matsuba Station opened on 1 November 1971, as a station on the Japan National Railways (JNR) Kakunodate Line, serving the town of Nishiki, Akita. The line was privatized on 1 November 1986, becoming the Akita Nairiku Jūkan Railway. Matsuba Station was the terminal of the original southern section of the line, until the tracks were extended to Hitachinai on 1 April 1989.

== Surrounding area ==
- National Route 105
- Lake Tazawa
