= 生田駅 =

生田駅 is the name of multiple train stations in Japan:

- Ikuta Station
- Shōden Station
