= Ugo-Ōta Station =

Railway station in Semboku, Akita Prefecture, Japan

Ugo-Ōta Station 羽後太田駅
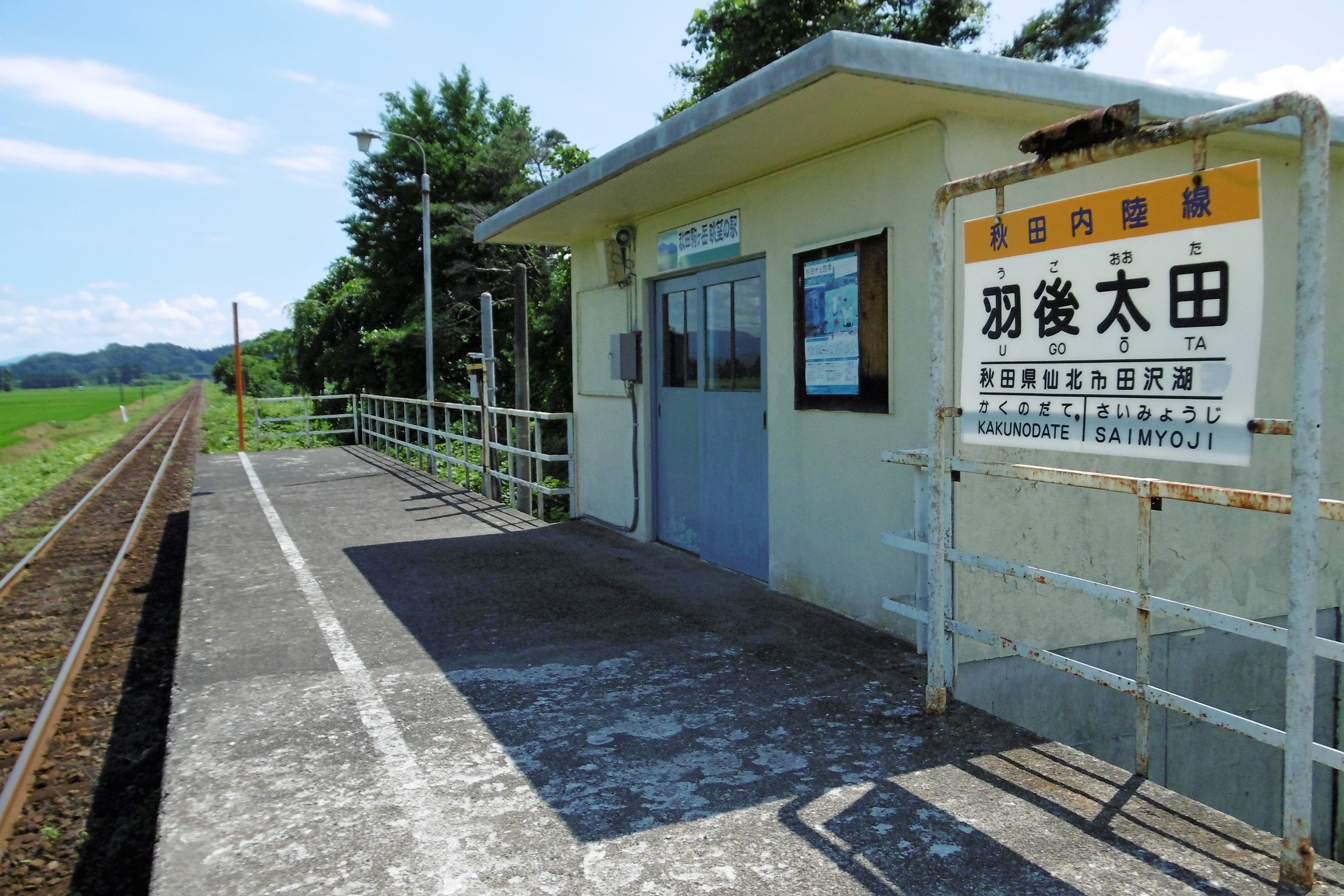
- Ugo-Ōta Station in July 2017

General information
- Location: Torihashi Tazawako Kakudatehigashimaego, Semboku-shi, Akita-ken 014-1116; Japan
- Coordinates: 39°37′37.61″N 140°34′27.21″E
- Operator: Akita Nariku Railway
- Line: ■ Nairiku Line
- Distance: 89.9 kilometers from Takanosu
- Platforms: 1 side platform

Other information
- Status: Unstaffed
- Website: Official website

History
- Opened: November 1, 1971
Location
- Location within Akita Prefecture Location within Japan

Ugo-Ōta Station (羽後太田駅, Ugo-Ōta-eki) is a railway station located in the city of Semboku, Akita Prefecture, Japan, operated by the third sector railway operator Akita Nairiku Jūkan Railway.

== Lines ==
Ugo-Ōta Station is served by the Nariku Line, and is located 89.9 km from the terminus of the line at Takanosu Station.

== Station layout ==
The station consists of one side platform serving a single bi-directional track. The station is unattended. There is no station building, but only a shelter built on the platform.

== Adjacent stations ==
«	Service	»
Akita Nairiku Jūkan Railway Akita Nairiku Line
Rapid: Does not stop at this station
Saimyoji	-	Kakunodate

== History ==
Ugo-Ōta Station opened on 1 November 1971, as a station on the Japan National Railways (JNR) Kakunodate Line, serving the town of Tazawako, Akita. The line was privatized on 1 November 1986, becoming the Akita Nairiku Jūkan Railway.

== Surrounding area ==
- National Route 105
