= Jindai Station =

Railway station in Semboku, Akita Prefecture, Japan

Jindai Station 神代駅
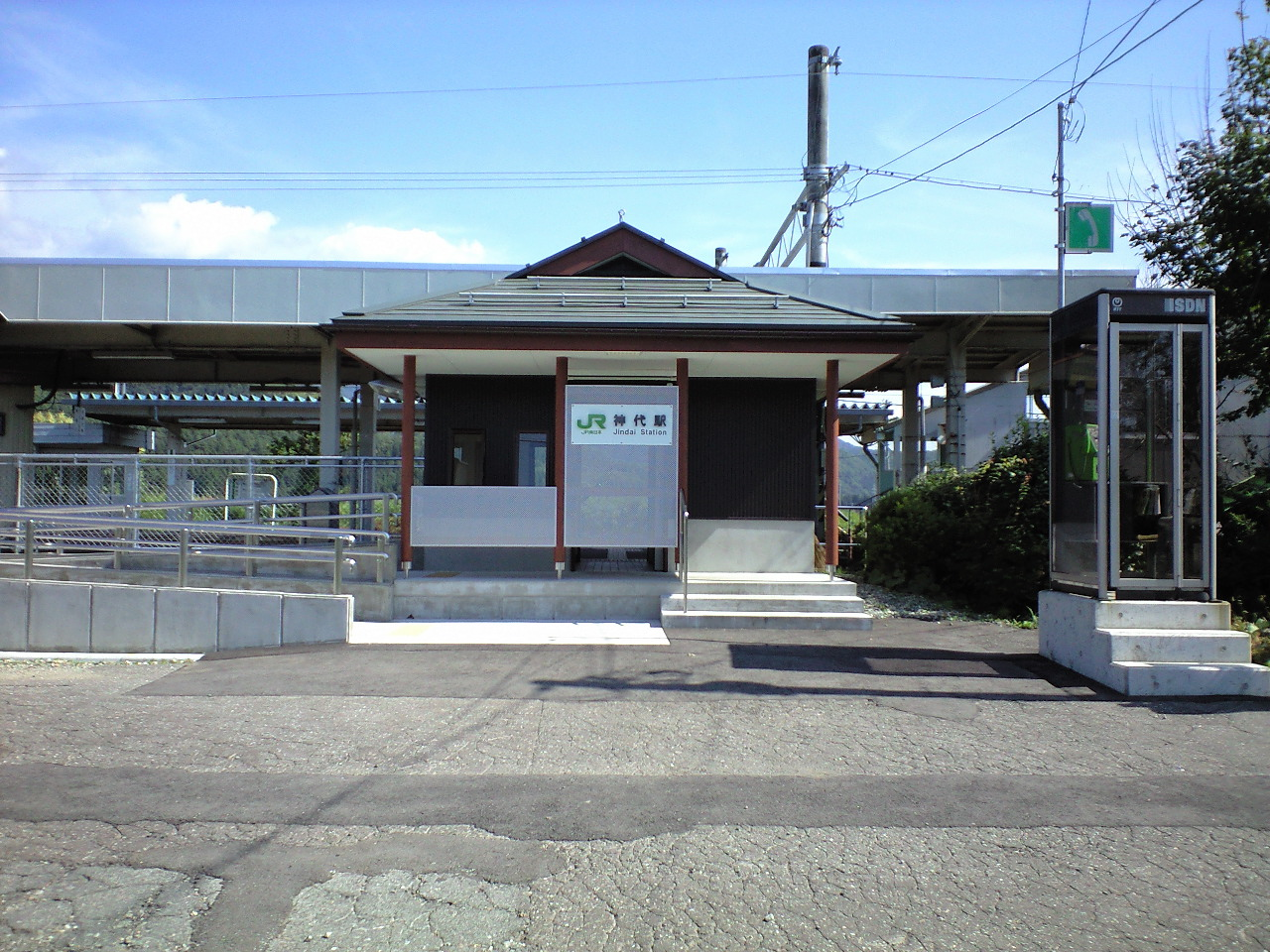
- Jindai Station in August 2008

General information
- Location: Tazawako-Sotsuda Aze Shirahata 75-4, Semboku, Akita （秋田県仙北市田沢湖卒田字白旗75-4） Japan
- Coordinates: 39°37′21.6″N 140°37′38.6″E
- Operator: JR East
- Line: ■ Tazawako Line
- Distance: 52.8 kilometers from Morioka
- Platforms: 2 side platforms

Other information
- Status: Unstaffed
- Website: Official website

History
- Opened: December 11, 1921

Services
Preceding station	JR East	Following station
Shōden towards Ōmagari	Tazawako Line	Sashimaki towards Morioka
Location
- Location within Akita Prefecture Location within Japan

Jindai Station (神代駅, Jindai-eki) is a railway station located in the city of Semboku, Akita Prefecture, Japan, operated by JR East.

== Lines ==
Jindai Station is served by the Tazawako Line, and is located 52.8 km from the terminus of the line at Morioka Station. The route of the Akita Shinkansen passes through this station.

== Station layout ==
The station has two opposed side platforms connected by a level crossing. The station is unattended.

=== Platforms ===
1	■ Tazawako Line	for Morioka
2	■ Tazawako Line	for Kakunodate and Ōmagari

== History ==
Jindai Station opened on December 11, 1921 as a station on the Obonai keiben-sen, serving the village of Jindai, Akita. The line was nationalized the following year, becoming part of the Japanese Government Railway (JGR) network, which became the Japan National Railways (JNR) after World War II. The station was absorbed into the JR East network upon the privatization of the JNR on April 1, 1987. A new station building was completed in March 1997.

== Surrounding area ==
- National Route 46

== See also ==
- List of railway stations in Japan
