= Sadōri Station =

Railway station in Semboku, Akita Prefecture, Japan

Sadōri Station 左通駅
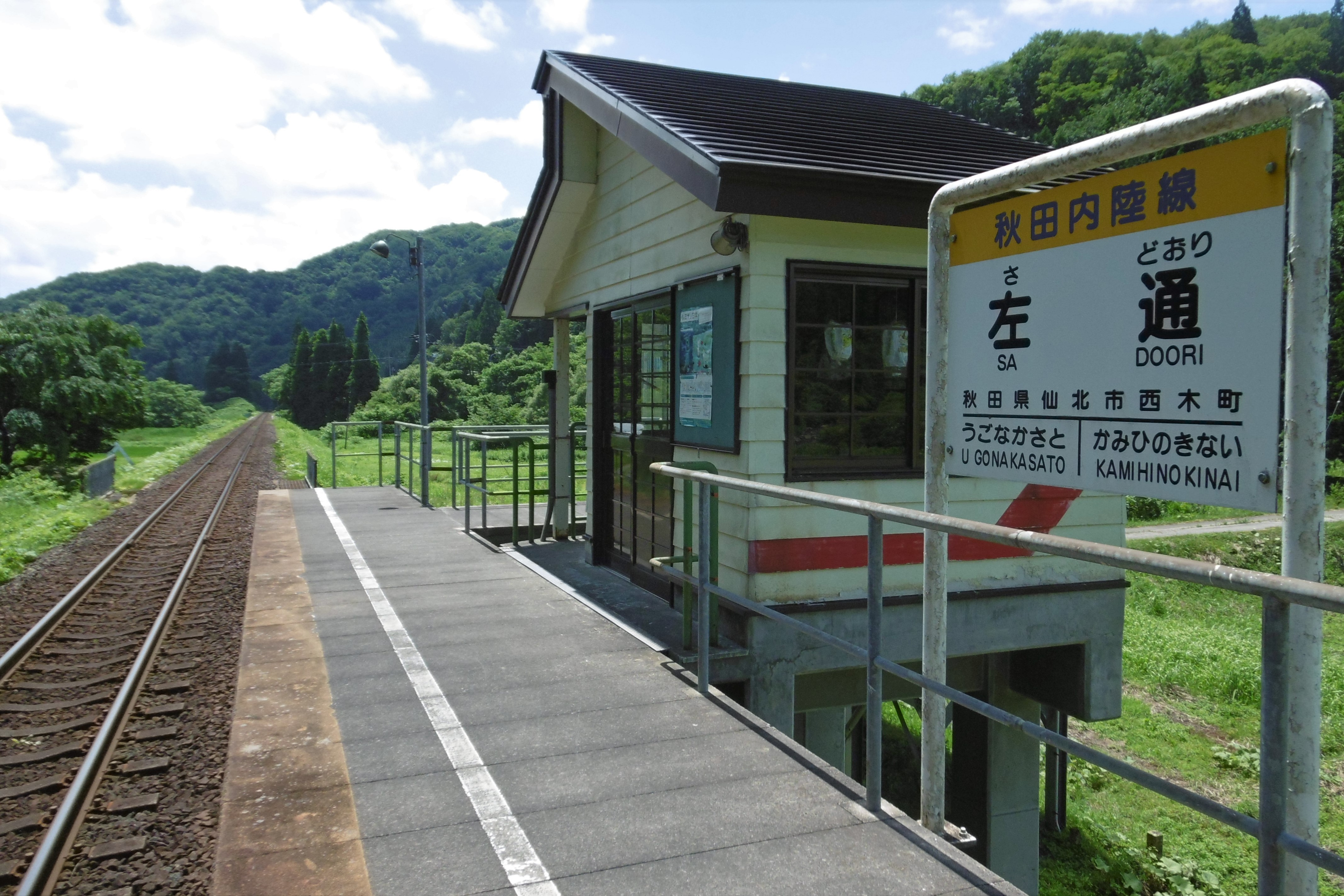
- Sadōri Station in July 2017

General information
- Location: Nishikicho Kamihinokinai, Semboku-shi, Akita-ken 014-0601; Japan
- Coordinates: 39°48′6.63″N 140°35′9.83″E
- Operator: Akita Nariku Railway
- Line: ■ Nairiku Line
- Distance: 67.7 kilometers from Takanosu
- Platforms: 1 side platform

Other information
- Status: Unstaffed
- Website: Official website

History
- Opened: April 1, 1989
Location
- Location within Akita Prefecture Location within Japan

Sadōri Station (左通駅, Sadōri-eki) is a railway station located in the city of Semboku, Akita Prefecture, Japan, operated by the third sector railway operator Akita Nairiku Jūkan Railway.

== Lines ==
Sadōri Station is served by the Nariku Line, and is located 67.7 km from the terminus of the line at Takanosu Station.

== Station layout ==
The station consists of one side platform serving a single bi-directional track. The station is unattended. There is no station building, but only a shelter built on the platform.

== Adjacent stations ==
«	Service	»
Akita Nairiku Jūkan Railway Akita Nairiku Line
Rapid: Does not stop at this station
Kami-Hinokinai	-	Ugo-Nakazato

== History ==
Sadōri Station opened on 1 April 1989 serving the village of Nishiki, Akita.The opening of the station coincided with the start of operations on the central section of the Nairiku Line between Matsuba and Hitachinai.

== Surrounding area ==
- National Route 105
