= Tozawa Station =

Railway station in Semboku, Akita Prefecture, Japan

Tozawa Station 戸沢駅
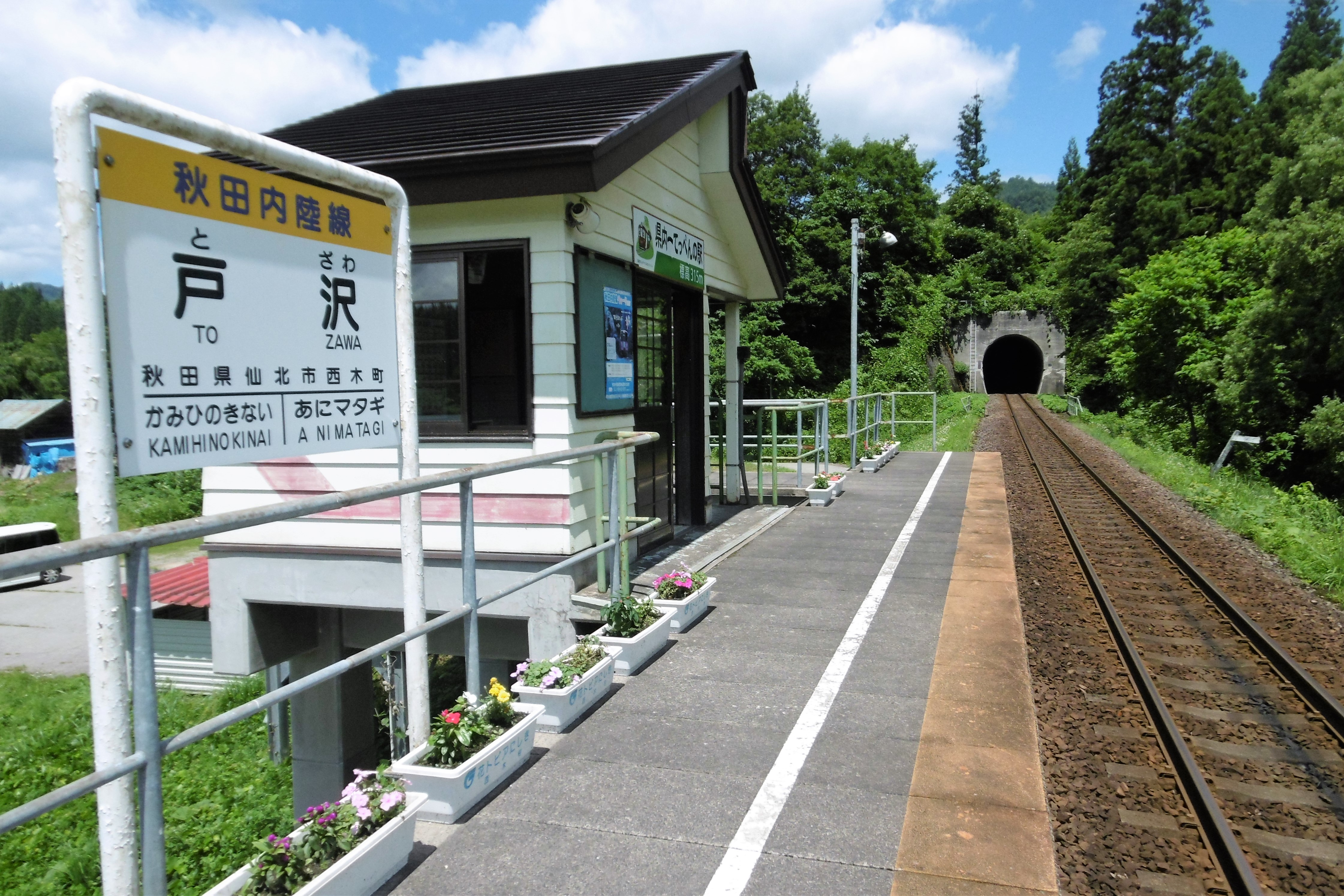
- Tozawa Station in September 2017

General information
- Location: Nishishimotozawa Nishikicho Kamihinokinai, Semboku-shi, Akita-ken 014-0601; Japan
- Coordinates: 39°51′32.66″N 140°34′52.17″E
- Operator: Akita Nariku Railway
- Line: ■ Nairiku Line
- Distance: 61.2 kilometers from Takanosu
- Platforms: 1 side platform
- Tracks: 1

Construction
- Structure type: At-grade

Other information
- Status: Unstaffed
- Website: Official website

History
- Opened: April 1, 1989
Location
- Location within Akita Prefecture Location within Japan

Tozawa Station (戸沢駅, Tozawa-eki) is a railway station located in the city of Semboku, Akita Prefecture, Japan, operated by the third sector railway operator Akita Nairiku Jūkan Railway.

== Lines ==
Tozawa Station is served by the Nariku Line, and is located 61.2 km from the terminus of the line at Takanosu Station.

== Station layout ==
The station consists of one side platform serving a single bi-directional track. The station is unattended. There is no station building, but only a shelter built on the platform.

== Adjacent stations ==
«	Service	»
Akita Nairiku Jūkan Railway Akita Nairiku Line
Rapid: Does not stop at this station
Ani-Matagi	-	Kami-Hinokinai

== History ==
Tozawa Station opened on 1 April 1989, serving the village of Nishiki, Akita. The opening of the station coincided with the start of operations on the central section of the Nairiku Line between Matsuba and Hitachinai.

== Surrounding area ==
- National Route 105
- Site of Tozawa Castle
