= Ugo-Nagano Station =

Railway station in Daisen, Akita Prefecture, Japan

Ugo-Nagano Station 羽後長野駅
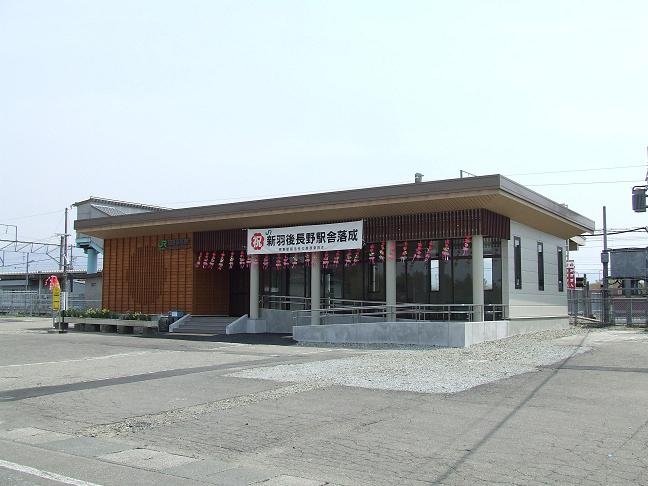
- Ugo-Nagano Station in May 2009

General information
- Location: Yanagita-199-2 Nagano, Daisen-shi, Akita-ken 014-0207; Japan
- Coordinates: 39°32′45.3″N 140°32′26.1″E
- Operator: JR East
- Line: ■ Tazawako Line
- Distance: 64.6 kilometers from Morioka
- Platforms: 2 side platforms

Other information
- Status: Staffed
- Website: Official website

History
- Opened: July 30, 1921

Passengers
- FY2018: 92

Services
Preceding station	JR East	Following station
Yariminai towards Ōmagari	Tazawako Line	Uguisuno towards Morioka
Location
- Location within Akita Prefecture Location within Japan

Ugo-Nagano Station (羽後長野駅, Ugo-Nagano-eki) is a railway station located in the city of Daisen, Akita Prefecture, Japan, operated by JR East.

== Lines ==
Ugo-Nagoya Station is served by the Tazawako Line, and is located 64.6 km from the terminus of the line at Morioka Station.

== Station layout ==
The station has two opposed side platforms connected by a footbridge. The station is staffed.

=== Platforms ===
1	■ Tazawako Line	for Kakunodate and Tazawako
2	■ Tazawako Line	for Ōmagari

== History ==
Ugo-Nagano Station opened on July 30, 1921 as a station on the Obonai keiben-sen, began operations from July 30, 1921, and was nationalized the following year, becoming part of the Japanese Government Railways (JGR), the pre-war predecessor to the Japan National Railways (JNR), serving the village of Nakano, Akita. The station was absorbed into the JR East network upon the privatization of the JNR on April 1, 1987. A new station building was completed in March 2009.

== Passenger statistics ==
In fiscal 2018, the station was used by an average of 92 passengers daily (boarding passengers only).

== Surrounding area ==
- National Route 105
- former Nakasen Town Hall

== See also ==
- List of railway stations in Japan
