= Sashimaki Station =

Railway station in Semboku, Akita Prefecture, Japan

Sashimaki Station 刺巻駅
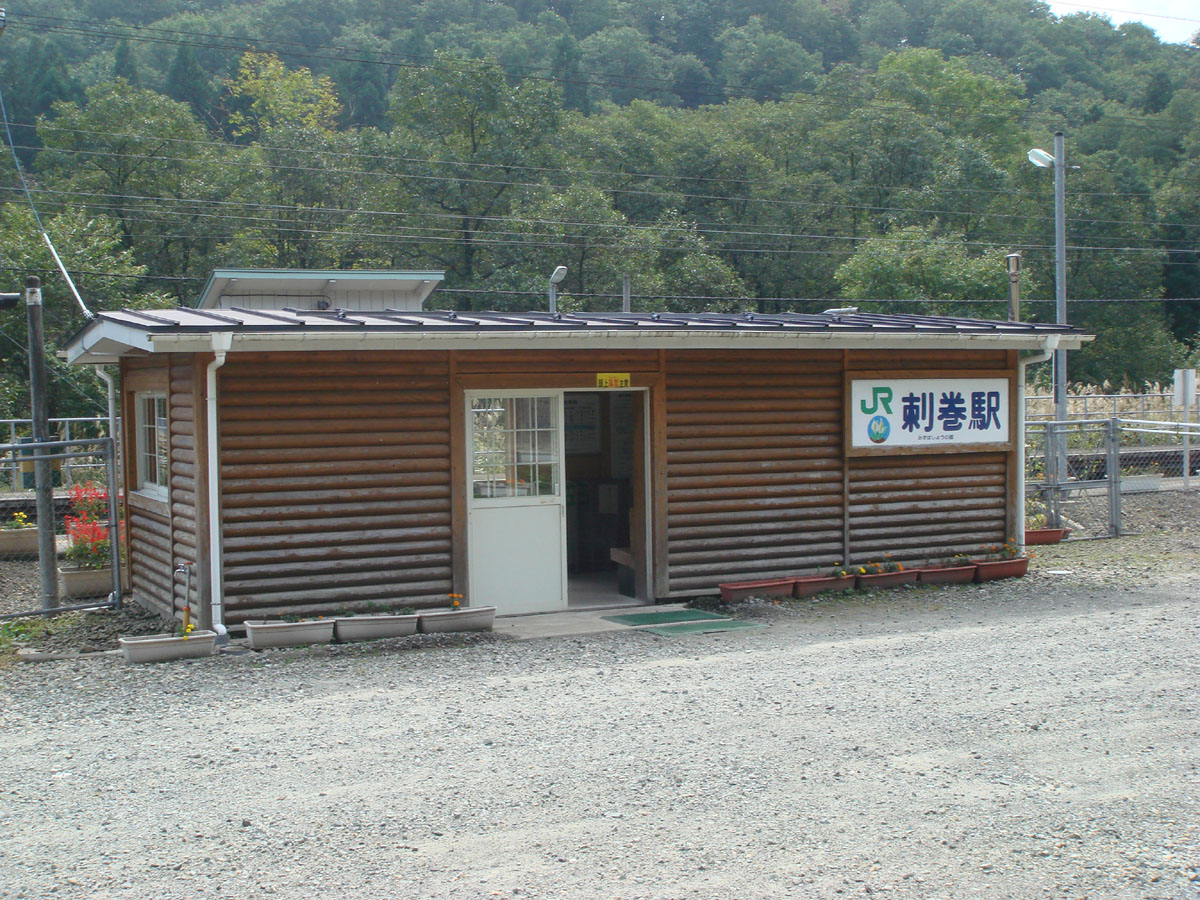
- Sashimaki Station, October 2006

General information
- Location: Ōmichi-242 Tazawako Sashimaki, Semboku-shi, Akita-ken 014-1202; Japan
- Coordinates: 39°40′7″N 140°41′31.1″E
- Operator: JR East
- Line: ■ Tazawako Line
- Distance: 44.4 kilometers from Morioka
- Platforms: 2 side platforms

Other information
- Status: Unstaffed
- Website: Official website

History
- Opened: August 31, 1923

Services
| Preceding station | JR East | Following station |
|---|---|---|
| Jindai towards Ōmagari | Tazawako Line | Tazawako towards Morioka |
Location
- Location within Akita Prefecture Location within Japan

Sashimaki Station (刺巻駅, Sashimaki-eki) is a railway station located in the city of Semboku, Akita Prefecture, Japan, operated by JR East.

== Lines ==
Sashimaki Station is served by the Tazawako Line, and is located 44.4 km from the terminus of the line at Morioka Station.

== Station layout ==
The station has two opposed side platforms connected by a level crossing. The station is unattended.

=== Platforms ===
| 1 | ■ Tazawako Line | for Morioka |
| 2 | ■ Tazawako Line | for Kakunodate and Ōmagari |

== History ==
Sashimaki Station opened on August 31, 1923 as a station on the Japanese Government Railway (JGR), Obonai keiben-sen, serving the village of Obonai, Akita. The JGR became the Japanese National Railways (JNR) after World War II. The station was absorbed into the JR East network upon the privatization of the JNR on April 1, 1987. A new log cabin style station building was completed in March 1997.

== Surrounding area ==
- National Route 46

== See also ==
- List of railway stations in Japan
