= Saimyoji Station =

Railway station in Semboku, Akita Prefecture, Japan

Saimyoji Station 西明寺駅
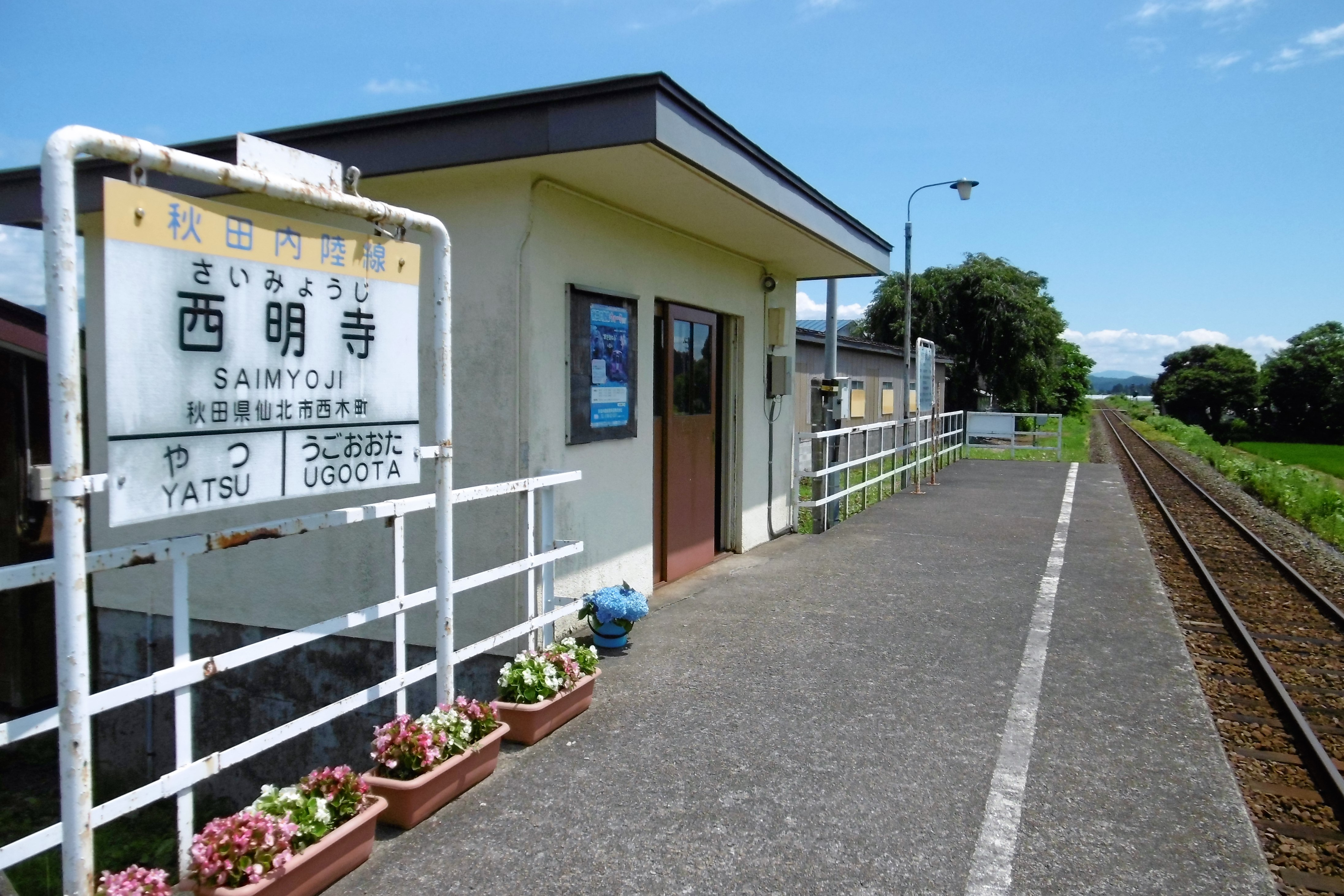
- Saimyoji Station, July 2017

General information
- Location: Ropponsugi Nishikicho Kadoya, Semboku-shi, Akita-ken 014-0515; Japan
- Coordinates: 39°39′11.55″N 140°33′47.52″E
- Operator: Akita Nariku Railway
- Line: ■ Nairiku Line
- Distance: 86.9 kilometers from Takanosu
- Platforms: 1 side platform

Other information
- Status: Unstaffed
- Website: Official website

History
- Opened: November 1, 1971
Location
- Location within Akita Prefecture Location within Japan

Saimyoji Station (西明寺駅, Saimyōji-eki) is a railway station located in the city of Semboku, Akita Prefecture, Japan, operated by the third sector railway operator Akita Nairiku Jūkan Railway.

== Lines ==
Saimyoji Station is served by the Nariku Line, and is located 86.9 km from the terminus of the line at Takanosu Station.

== Station layout ==
The station consists of one side platform serving a single bi-directional track. The station is unattended. There is no station building, but only a shelter built on the platform.

== Adjacent stations ==
«	Service	»
Akita Nairiku Jūkan Railway Akita Nairiku Line
Matsuba	Express Moriyoshi	Kakunodate
Yatsu	-	Ugo-Ōta

== History ==
Saimyoji Station opened on November 1, 1971, as a station on the Japanese National Railways (JNR) Kakunodate Line, serving the town of Nishiki, Akita. The line was privatized on 1 November 1986, becoming the Akita Nairiku Jūkan Railway.

== Surrounding area ==
- National Route 105
