= Kami-Hinokinai Station =

Railway station in Semboku, Akita Prefecture, Japan

Kami-Hinokinai Station 上桧木内駅
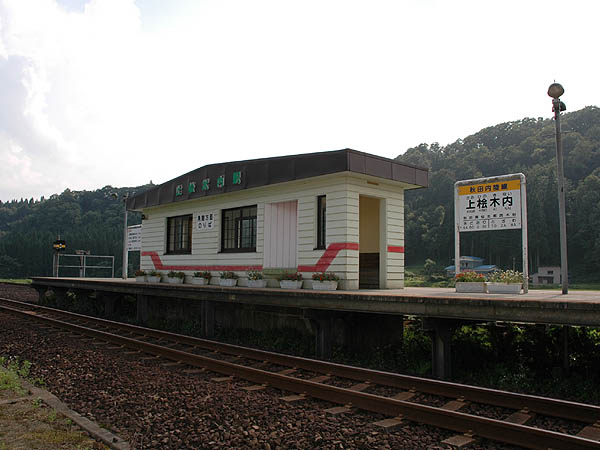
- Kami-Hinokinai Station, August 2005

General information
- Location: Ochida-3-1 Nishikicho Kamihinokinai, Semboku-shi, Akita-ken 014-0601; Japan
- Coordinates: 39°49′5.19″N 140°34′56.94″E
- Operator: Akita Nariku Railway
- Line: ■ Nairiku Line
- Distance: 65.9 kilometers from Takanosu
- Platforms: 1 island platform

Other information
- Status: Unstaffed
- Website: Official website

History
- Opened: April 1, 1989
Location
- Location within Akita Prefecture Location within Japan

Kami-Hinokinai Station (上桧木内駅, Kami-Hinokinai-eki) is a railway station located in the city of Semboku, Akita Prefecture, Japan, operated by the third sector railway operator Akita Nairiku Jūkan Railway.

== Lines ==
Kami-Hinokinai Station is served by the Nariku Line, and is located 65.9 km from the terminus of the line at Takanosu Station.

== Station layout ==
The station consists of one island platform with a level crossing. The station is unattended. There is no station building, but only a shelter built on the platform.

== Adjacent stations ==
«	Service	»
Akita Nairiku Jūkan Railway Akita Nairiku Line
Ani-Matagi	Express Moriyoshi	Matsuba
Tozawa	-	Sadōri

== History ==
Kami-Hinokinai Station opened on 1 April 1989, serving the village of Nishiki, Akita. The opening of the station coincided with the start of operations on the central section of the Nairiku Line between Matsuba and Hitachinai.

== Surrounding area ==
- National Route 105
- Kamihinokinai Elementary School
