= Ugo-Yotsuya Station =

Railway station in Daisen, Akita Prefecture, Japan

Ugo-Yotsuya Station 羽後四ツ屋駅
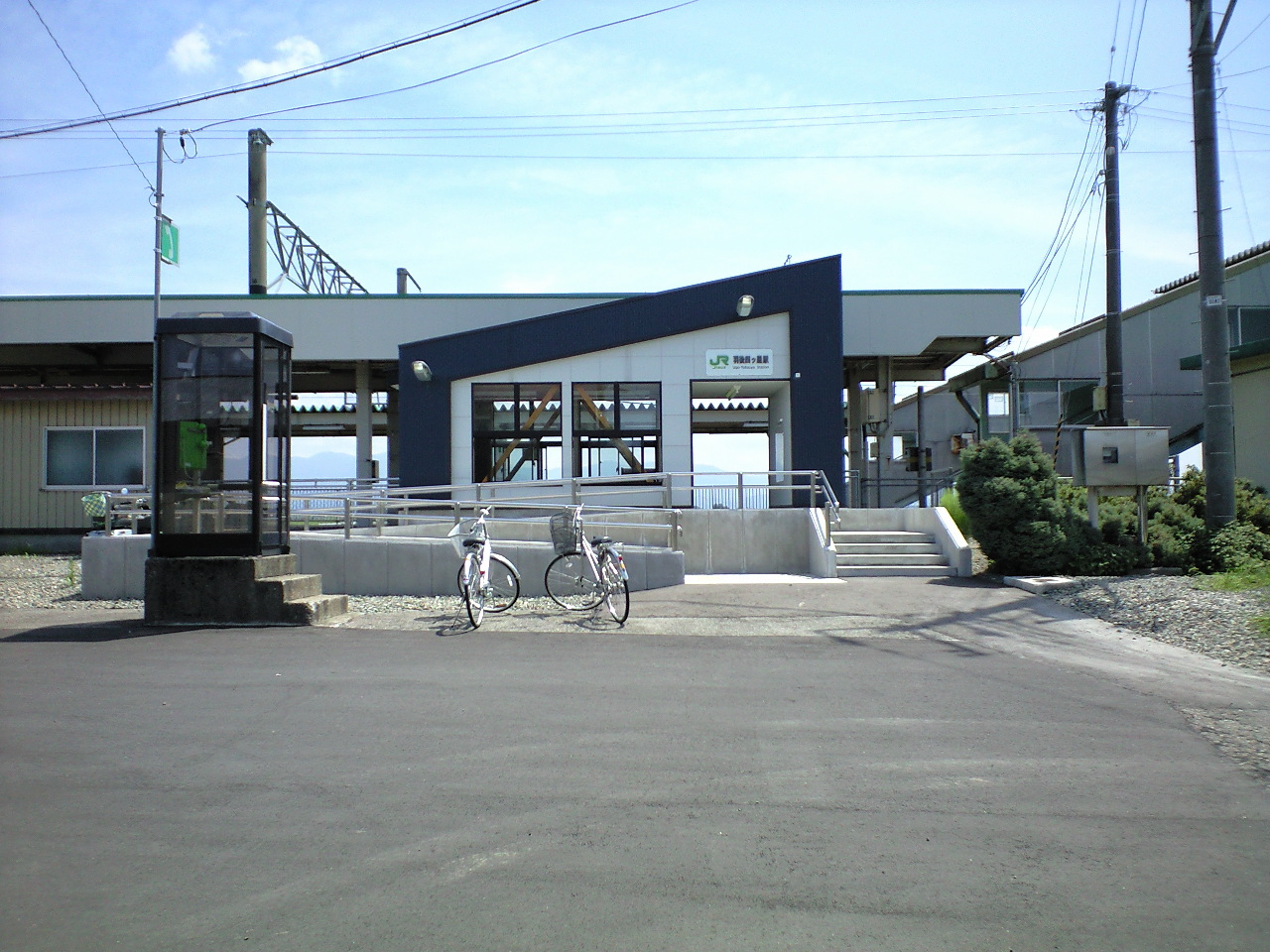
- Ugo-Yotsuya Station

General information
- Location: Yotsuya Aze Maeda 433, Daisen, Akita （秋田県大仙市四ツ屋字前田433） Japan
- Coordinates: 39°30′6.3″N 140°30′42.9″E
- Operator: JR East
- Line: ■ Tazawako Line
- Distance: 70.2 kilometers from Morioka
- Platforms: 2 side platforms

Other information
- Status: Unstaffed
- Website: Official website

History
- Opened: July 30, 1921

Passengers
- FY2005: 26

Services
Preceding station	JR East	Following station
Kita-Ōmagari towards Ōmagari	Tazawako Line	Yariminai towards Morioka
Location
- Location within Akita Prefecture Location within Japan

Ugo-Yotsuya Station (羽後四ツ屋駅, Ugo-Yotsuya-eki) is a railway station located in the city of Daisen, Akita Prefecture, Japan, operated by JR East.

== Lines ==
Ugo-Yotsuya Station is served by the Tazawako Line, and is located 70.2 km from the terminus of the line at Morioka Station.

== Station layout ==
The station has two opposed side platforms connected by a footbridge; however, only platform 1 is currently in normal use. The route of the Akita Shinkansen passes along both platforms. The station is unattended.

=== Platforms ===
1	■ Tazawako Line	for Morioka for Ōmagari
2	■ Tazawako Line	for not in normal use

== History ==
Ugo-Yotsuya Station opened on July 30, 1921 as a station on the Obonai keiben-sen, began operations from July 30, 1921, and was nationalized the following year, becoming part of the Japanese Government Railways (JGR), the pre-war predecessor to the Japan National Railways (JNR), serving the village of Yotsuya, Akita. The station was absorbed into the JR East network upon the privatization of the JNR on April 1, 1987. It has been unattended since 2007.

== Passenger statistics ==
In fiscal 2005, the station was used by an average of 26 passengers daily (boarding passengers only).

== Surrounding area ==
- National Route 105

== See also ==
- List of railway stations in Japan
