= Yariminai Station =

Railway station in Daisen, Akita Prefecture, Japan

Yariminai Station 鑓見内駅
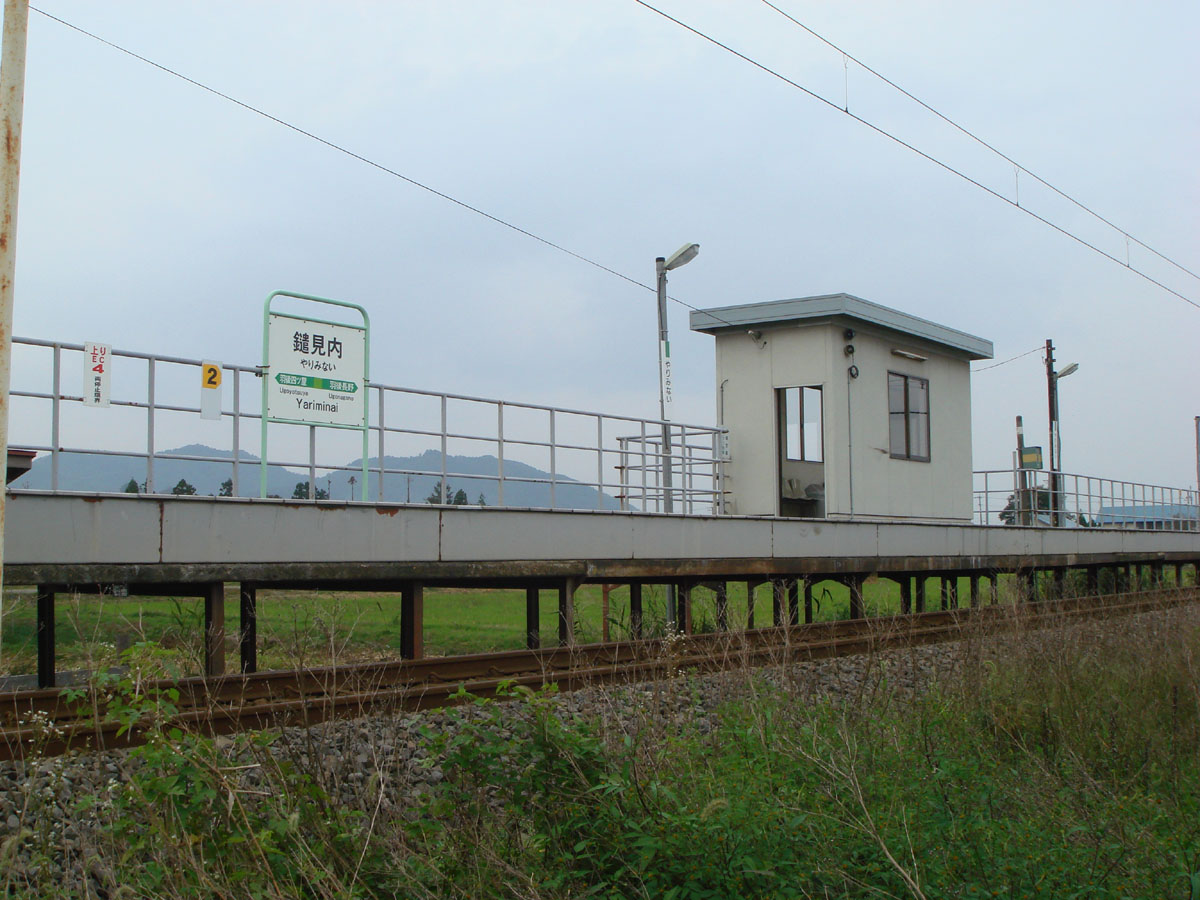
- Yariminai Station

General information
- Location: 242 Daikonda Yariminai, Daisen-shi, Akita-ken 014-0205; Japan
- Coordinates: 39°31′8.6″N 140°31′38.9″E
- Operator: JR East
- Line: ■ Tazawako Line
- Distance: 67.9 kilometers from Morioka
- Platforms: 1 side platform

Other information
- Status: Unstaffed
- Website: Official website

History
- Opened: April 1, 1960

Services
Preceding station	JR East	Following station
Ugo-Yotsuya towards Ōmagari	Tazawako Line	Ugo-Nagano towards Morioka
Location
- Location within Akita Prefecture Location within Japan

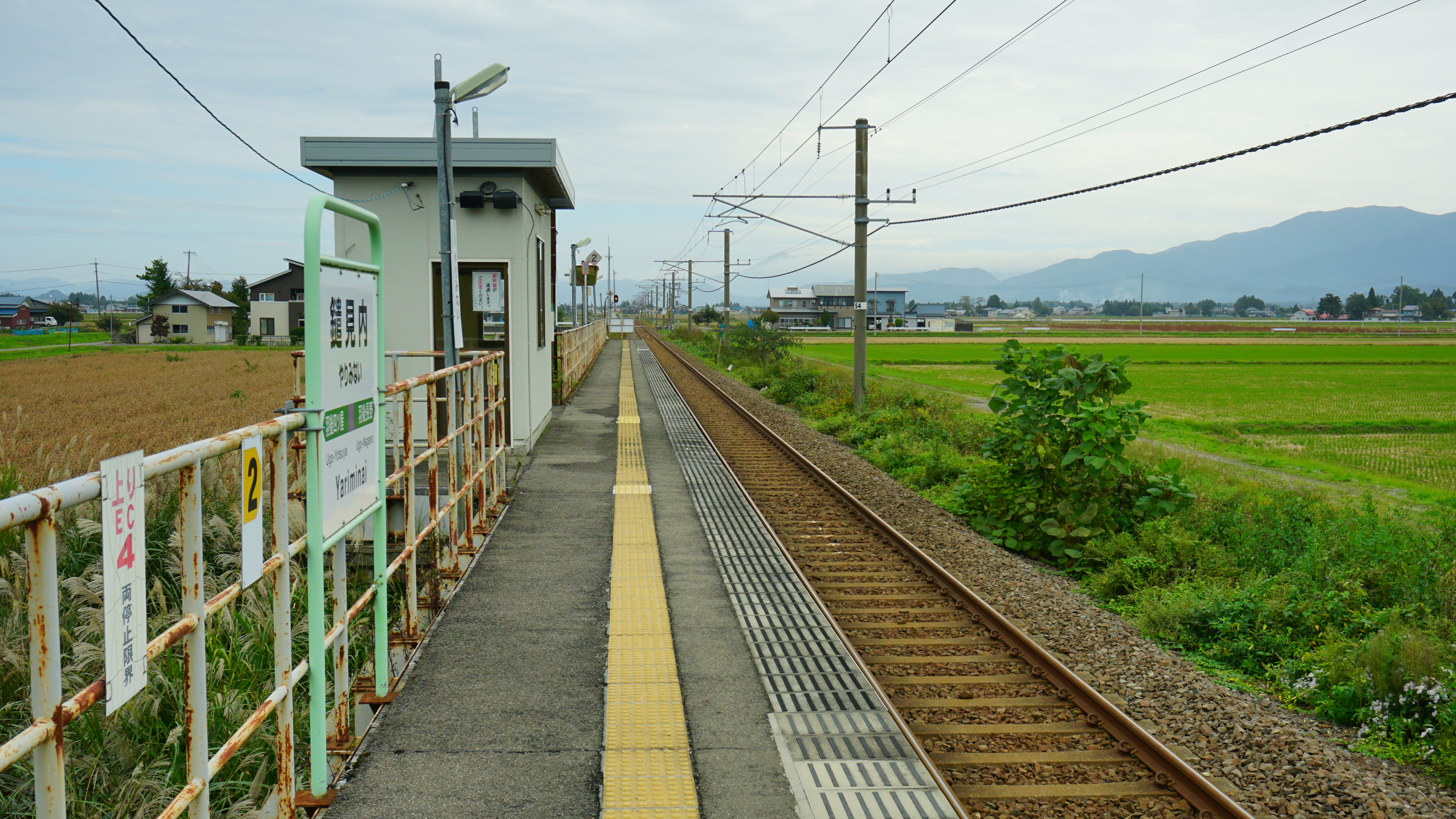
Platform

Yariminai Station (鑓見内駅, Yariminai-eki) is a railway station located in the city of Daisen, Akita Prefecture, Japan, operated by JR East.

== Lines ==
Yariminai Station is served by the Tazawako Line, and is located 67.9 km from the terminus of the line at Morioka Station.

== Station layout ==
The station consists of one side platform serving a single bi-directional traffic. There is no station building, but only a shelter built on the platform. The station is unattended.

== History ==
Yariminai Station opened on April 1, 1960, as a station on the Japan National Railways (JNR) serving the town of Nakasen, Akita. The station was absorbed into the JR East network upon the privatization of the JNR on April 1, 1987.

== Surrounding area ==
- National Route 105

== See also ==
- List of railway stations in Japan
