= Shōden Station =

Railway station in Semboku, Akita Prefecture, Japan

Shōden Station 生田駅
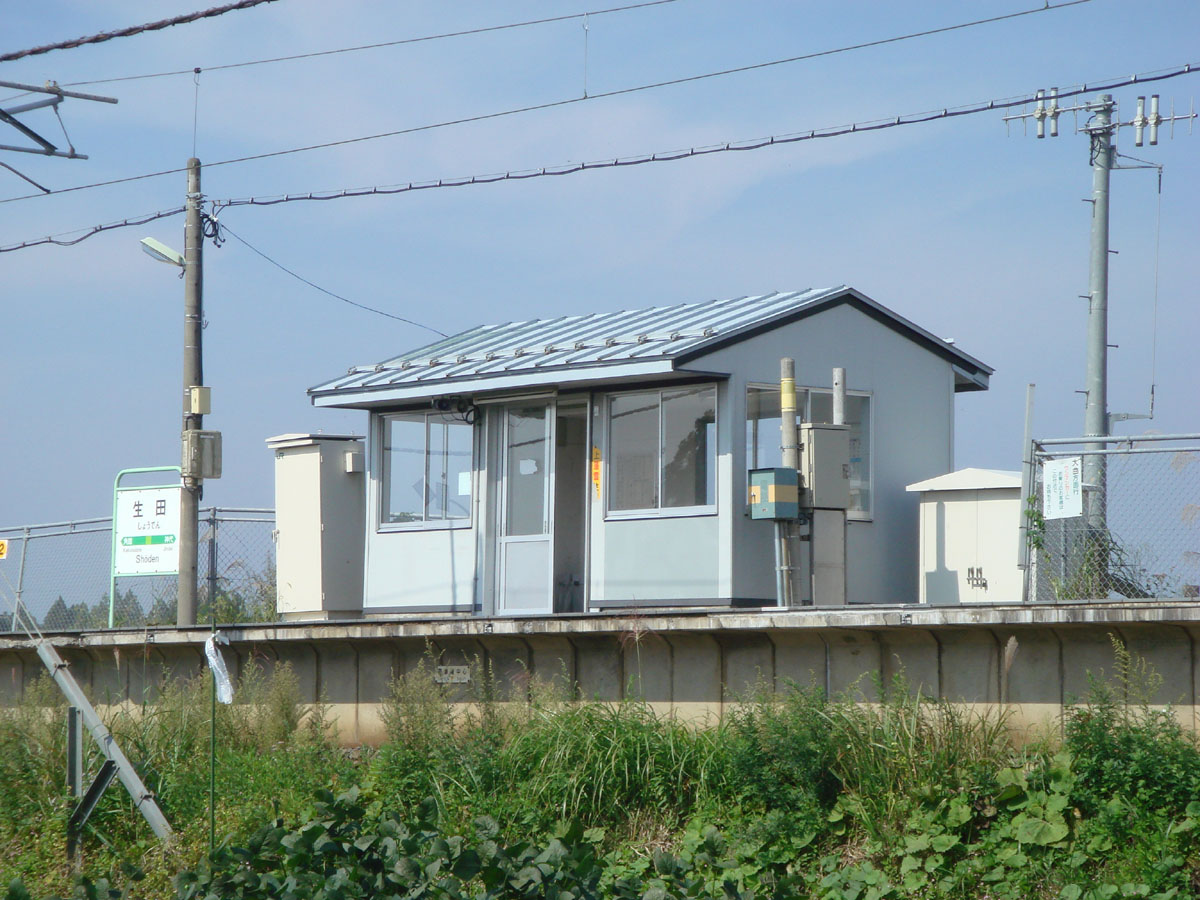
- Shōden Station, October 2006

General information
- Location: Kaidominami Tazawako Jindai, Semboku-shi, Akita-ken 014-1114; Japan
- Coordinates: 39°36′43.4″N 140°36′2.8″E
- Operator: JR East
- Line: ■ Tazawako Line
- Distance: 55.3 kilometers from Morioka
- Platforms: 1 side platform

Other information
- Status: Unstaffed
- Website: Official website

History
- Opened: July 10, 1955

Services
Preceding station	JR East	Following station
Kakunodate towards Ōmagari	Tazawako Line	Jindai towards Morioka
Location
- Location within Akita Prefecture Location within Japan

Shōden Station (生田駅, Shōden-eki) is a railway station located in the city of Semboku, Akita Prefecture, Japan, operated by JR East.

== Lines ==
Shōden Station is served by the Tazawako Line, and is located 55.3 km from the terminus of the line at Morioka Station.

== Station layout ==
The station has one side platform serving a single bi-directional track. There is no station building, but only a shelter built on the platform. The station is unattended.

== History ==
Shōden Station opened on July 10, 1955 as a station on the Japan National Railways (JNR) serving the town of Tazawako, Akita. The station was absorbed into the JR East network upon the privatization of the JNR on April 1, 1987.

== Surrounding area ==
- National Route 46

== See also ==
- List of railway stations in Japan
