= Kita-Ōmagari Station =

Railway station in Daisen, Akita Prefecture, Japan

Kita-Ōmagari Station 北大曲駅
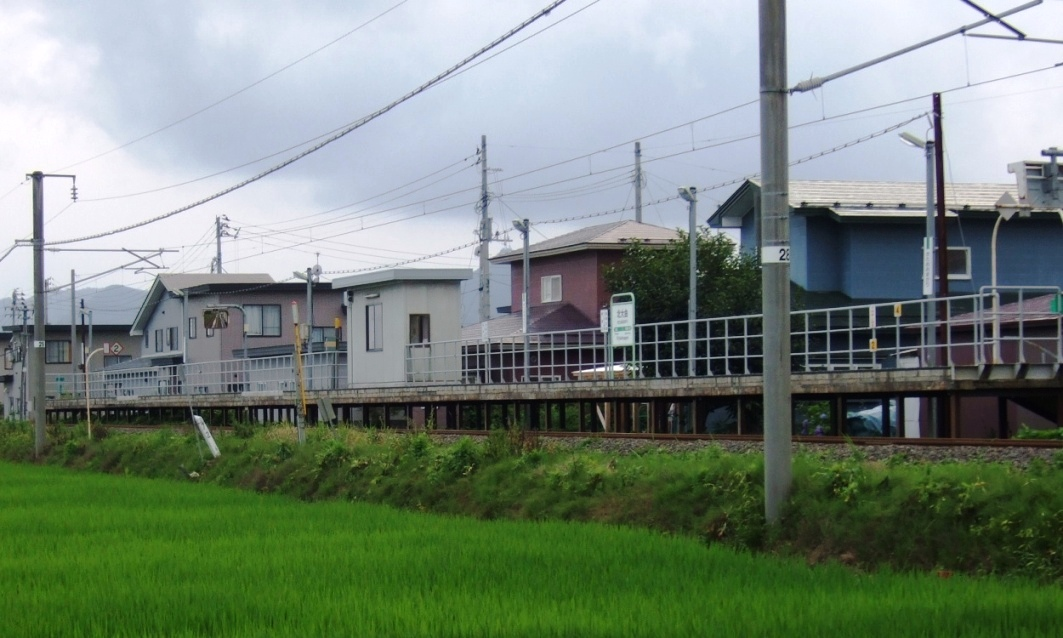
- Kita-Ōmagari Station in October 2006

General information
- Location: Yotsuya Aze Shimoaraichi 192, Daisen, Akita （秋田県大仙市四ツ屋字下新谷地192） Japan
- Coordinates: 39°29′22″N 140°29′53″E
- Operator: JR East
- Line: ■ Tazawako Line
- Distance: 72.0 kilometers from Morioka
- Platforms: 1 side platform

Other information
- Status: Unstaffed
- Website: Official website

History
- Opened: November 21, 1965

Services
Preceding station	JR East	Following station
Ōmagari Terminus	Tazawako Line	Ugo-Yotsuya towards Morioka
Location
- Location within Akita Prefecture Location within Japan

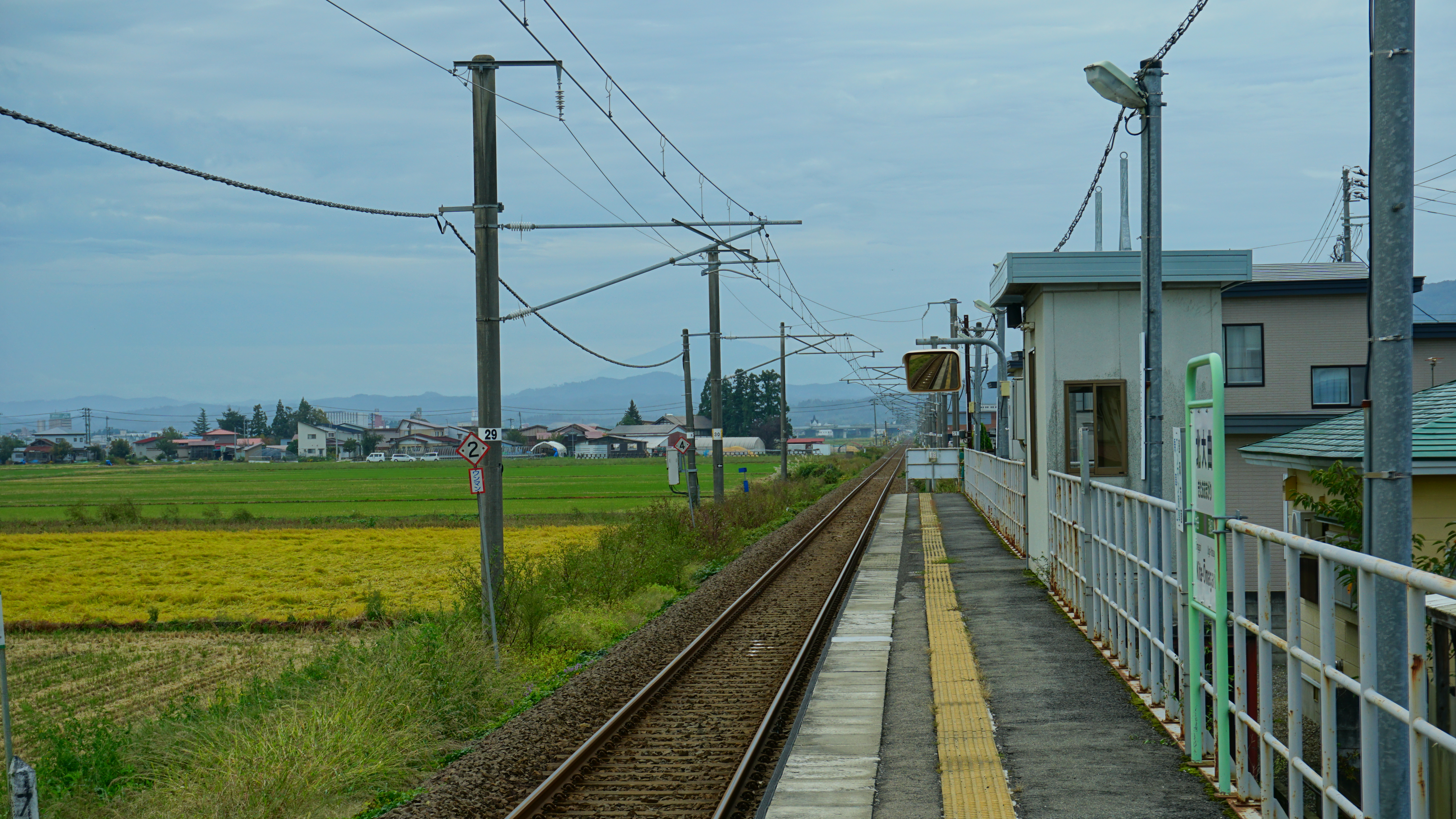
Platform

Kita-Ōmagari Station (北大曲駅, Kita-Ōmagari-eki) is a railway station located in the city of Daisen, Akita Prefecture, Japan, operated by JR East.

== Lines ==
Kita-Ōmagari Station is served by the Tazawako Line, and is located 72.0 km from the terminus of the line at Morioka Station.

== Station layout ==
Kita-Ōmagari Station consists of one side platform serving a single bi-directional traffic. There is no station building, but only a shelter built on the platform. The station is unattended.

== History ==
Kita-Ōmagari Station opened on November 21, 1965 as a station on the Japan National Railways (JNR) serving the city of Ōmagari, Akita. The station was absorbed into the JR East network upon the privatization of the JNR on April 1, 1987.

== See also ==
- List of railway stations in Japan

== Surrounding area ==
- National Route 105
- Yotsuya Post Office
