= Kakunodate, Akita =

Dissolved municipality in Akita prefecture, Japan

Coordinates: 39.599273°N 140.561494°E

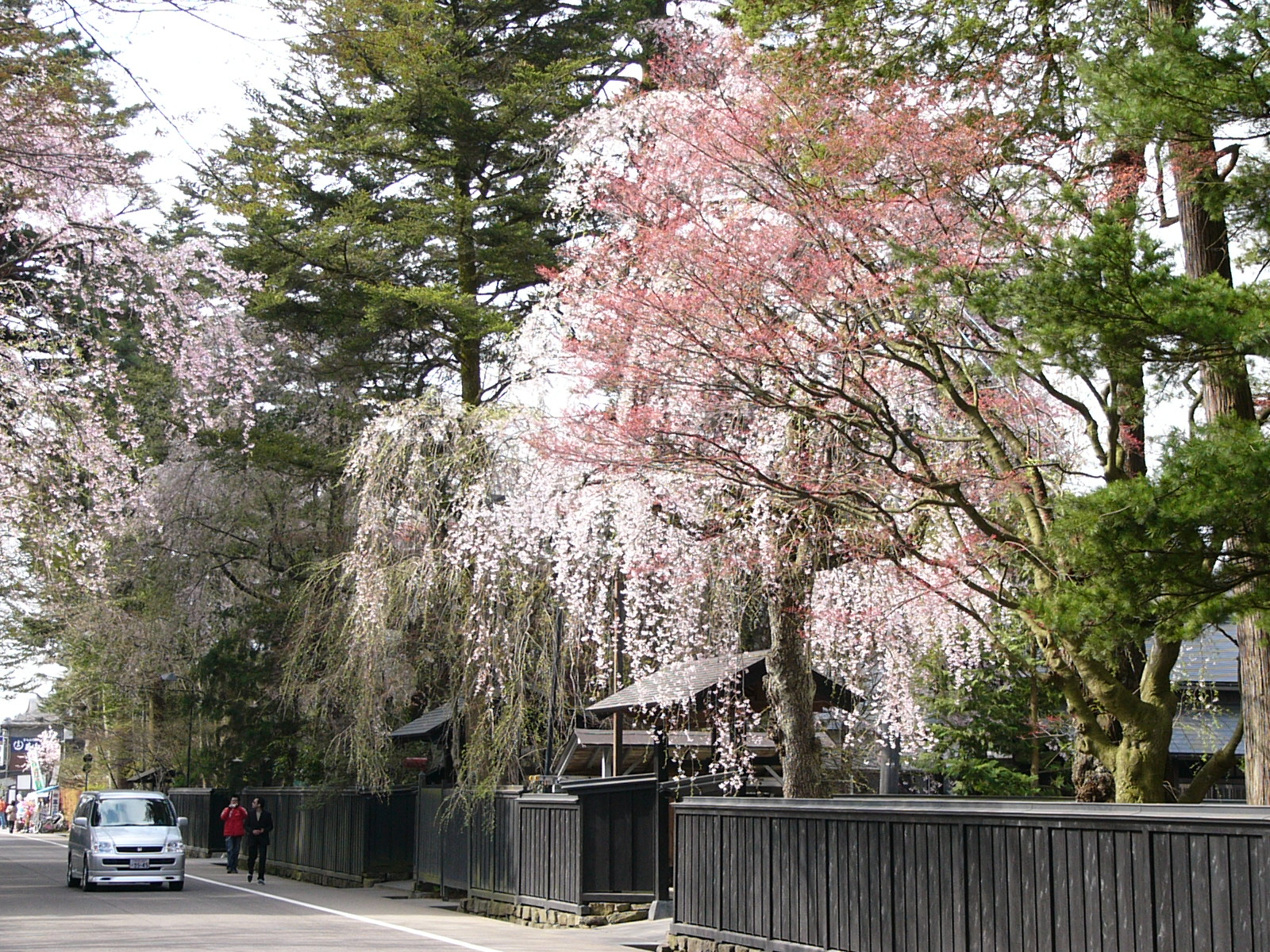
Bukeyashiki Street

Kakunodate (角館町, Kakunodate-machi) was a town located in Senboku District, Akita Prefecture, Japan. In 2003, the town had an estimated population of 14,138 and a density of 90.26 persons per km^{2}. The total area was 156.63 km^{2}.

On September 20, 2005, Kakunodate, along with the town of Tazawako, and the village of Nishiki (all from Senboku District), was merged to create the city of Semboku.

The town is famed for its well-preserved samurai houses and the proliferation of cherry trees. It is a popular destination for hanami, or cherry blossom viewing. It is sometimes referred as 'the little Kyoto of Tōhoku' (みちのくの小京都 Michinoku no sho-Kyōto).

There are the ruins of Kakunodate Castle, and Kakunodate-matsuri is an Important Intangible Folk Cultural Property. This city also hosts a "fire and snow" festival featuring kamakura snow domes each winter.

== See also ==
- Groups of Traditional Buildings
