= Semboku, Akita =

Semboku 仙北市
- City
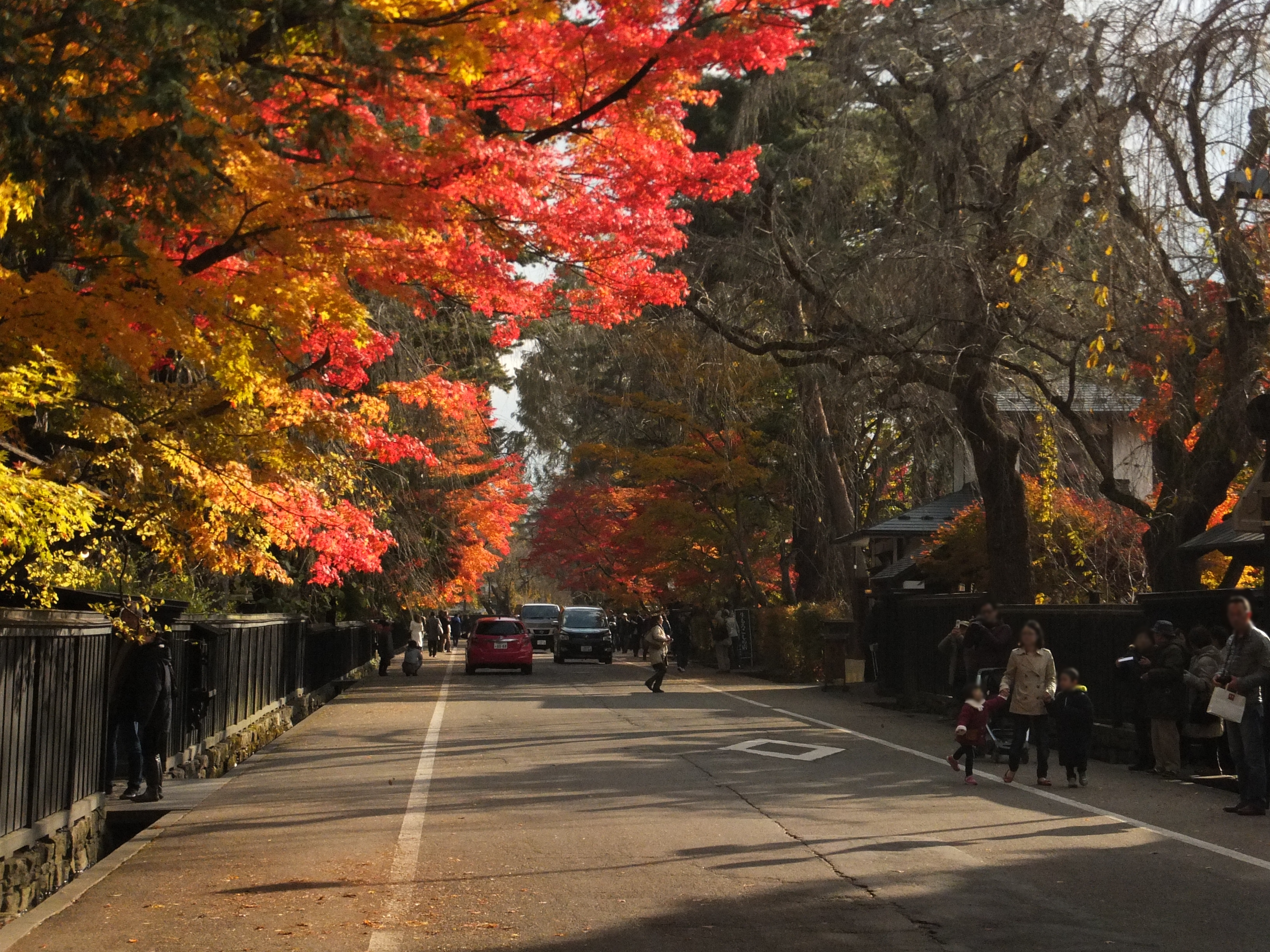
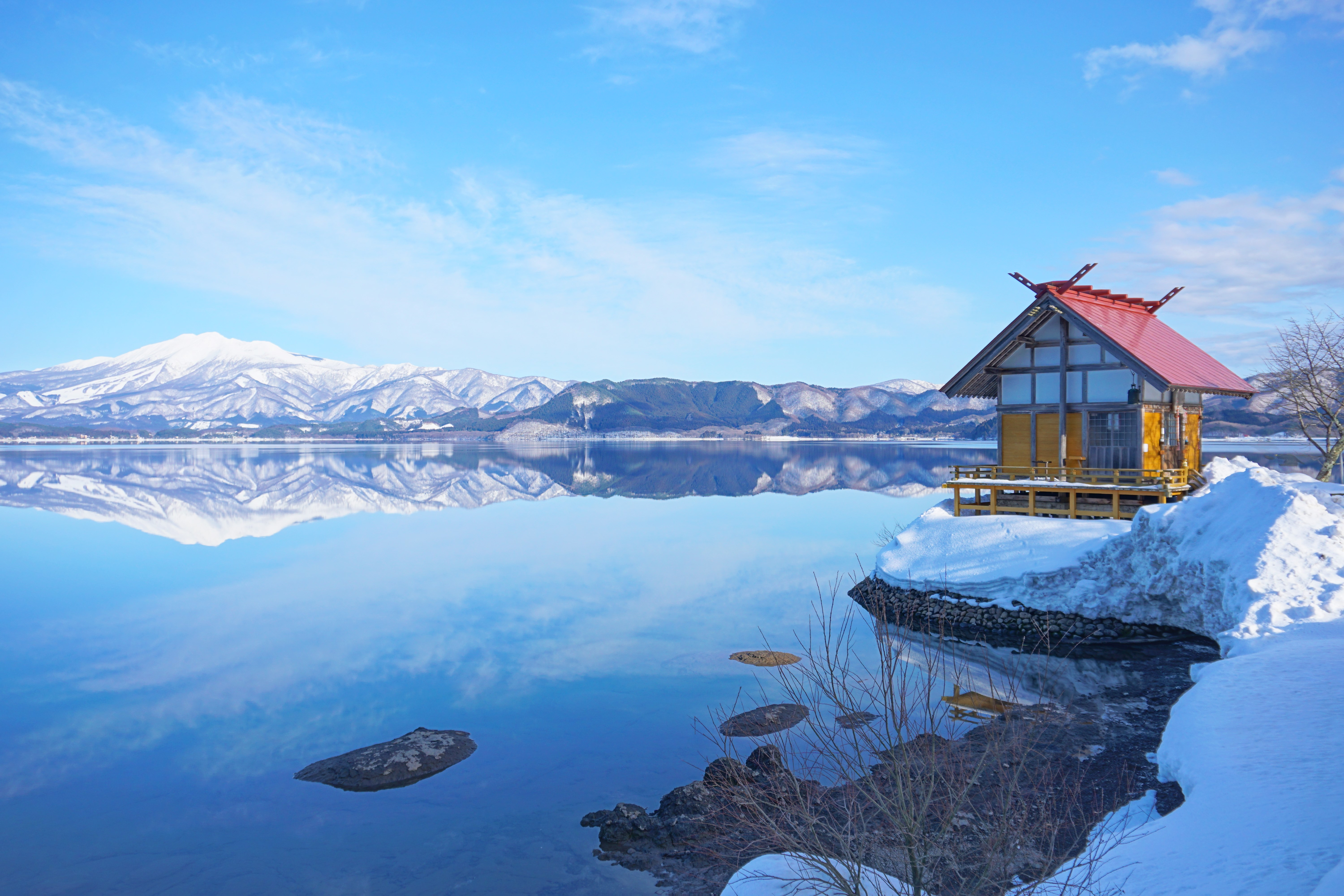
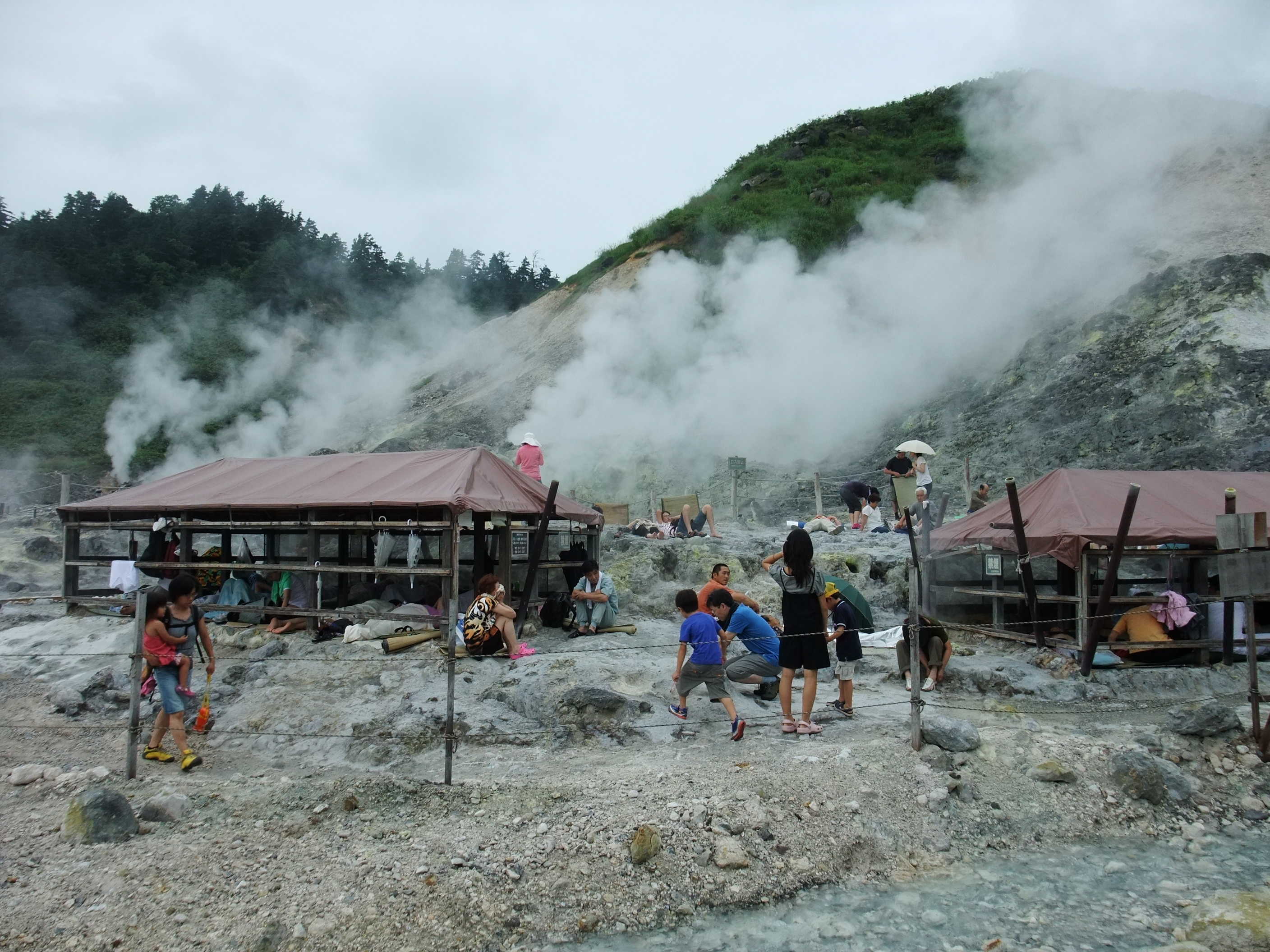
- Kakunodate Lake Tazawa Tamagawa Onsen Semboku City Hall Kakunodate Office

- Flag Seal
- Location of Semboku in Akita Prefecture
- Coordinates: 39°42′06″N 140°43′53.4″E
- Country: Japan
- Region: Tōhoku
- Prefecture: Akita

Area
  - Total: 1,093.56 km^{2} (422.23 sq mi)

Population (January 31, 2023)
  - Total: 24,045
  - Density: 21.988/km^{2} (56.948/sq mi)
- Time zone: UTC+9 (Japan Standard Time)
- Phone number: 0187-43-1111
- Address: 30 Miyanoshiro, Obonai, Tazawako, Semboku-shi, Akita-ken 014-1201
- Climate: Dfa
- Website: Official website
- Symbols
- Bird: Golden eagle
- Flower: Hydrangea
- Tree: Beech

Semboku (仙北市, Semboku-shi) is a city located in Akita Prefecture, Japan. As of 31 January 2023, the city had an estimated population of 24,045 in 10,398 households, and a population density of 22 persons per km^{2}. The total area of the city is 1,093.56 square kilometers (422 sq mi).

== Geography ==
Semboku is located in the mountains of east-central Akita Prefecture, bordering on Iwate Prefecture and the Ōu Mountains on the east. Lake Tazawa, the deepest lake in Japan, is located in the center of the city borders. Parts of the city are within the borders of the Towada-Hachimantai National Park.

=== Neighboring municipalities ===
Akita Prefecture

- Akita
- Daisen
- Kazuno
- Kitaakita

Iwate Prefecture

- Hachimantai
- Nishiwaga
- Shizukuishi

== Climate ==
Semboku has a humid continental climate (Köppen climate classification Dfa) with large seasonal temperature differences, with warm to hot (and often humid) summers and cold (sometimes severely cold) winters. Precipitation is significant throughout the year, but is heaviest from August to October. The average annual temperature in Semboku is 9.7 °C (49.5 °F). The average annual rainfall is 2,180.4 mm (85.84 in) with July as the wettest month. The temperatures are highest on average in August, at around 23.1 °C (73.6 °F), and lowest in January, at around −2.6 °C (27.3 °F).

Climate data for Tazawako, Semboku (elevation 230 m, 1991–2020 normals, extremes 1976–present)
Month	Jan	Feb	Mar	Apr	May	Jun	Jul	Aug	Sep	Oct	Nov	Dec	Year
Record high °C (°F)	10.9 (51.6)	16.8 (62.2)	19.5 (67.1)	29.4 (84.9)	32.3 (90.1)	32.6 (90.7)	36.3 (97.3)	36.5 (97.7)	33.3 (91.9)	28.3 (82.9)	23.2 (73.8)	15.4 (59.7)	36.5 (97.7)
Mean daily maximum °C (°F)	0.4 (32.7)	1.5 (34.7)	5.3 (41.5)	12.8 (55.0)	19.2 (66.6)	23.2 (73.8)	26.2 (79.2)	27.8 (82.0)	23.7 (74.7)	17.1 (62.8)	9.9 (49.8)	3.1 (37.6)	14.2 (57.6)
Daily mean °C (°F)	−2.6 (27.3)	−2.1 (28.2)	1.0 (33.8)	7.2 (45.0)	13.6 (56.5)	18.1 (64.6)	21.9 (71.4)	23.1 (73.6)	18.7 (65.7)	12.0 (53.6)	5.4 (41.7)	−0.1 (31.8)	9.7 (49.5)
Mean daily minimum °C (°F)	−6.0 (21.2)	−5.9 (21.4)	−3.1 (26.4)	1.8 (35.2)	8.1 (46.6)	13.5 (56.3)	18.3 (64.9)	19.3 (66.7)	14.5 (58.1)	7.2 (45.0)	1.2 (34.2)	−3.2 (26.2)	5.5 (41.9)
Record low °C (°F)	−17.6 (0.3)	−17.1 (1.2)	−16.1 (3.0)	−8.0 (17.6)	−2.0 (28.4)	3.8 (38.8)	9.6 (49.3)	9.0 (48.2)	2.2 (36.0)	−2.2 (28.0)	−8.2 (17.2)	−14.2 (6.4)	−17.6 (0.3)
Average precipitation mm (inches)	132.4 (5.21)	118.0 (4.65)	149.1 (5.87)	153.0 (6.02)	165.9 (6.53)	161.7 (6.37)	290.5 (11.44)	280.8 (11.06)	193.2 (7.61)	179.5 (7.07)	190.1 (7.48)	166.0 (6.54)	2,180.4 (85.84)
Average precipitation days (≥ 1.0 mm)	19.5	17.0	17.0	14.6	13.0	11.4	15.0	12.6	13.5	14.6	18.1	20.3	186.7
Mean monthly sunshine hours	41.6	60.2	94.5	137.4	178.2	165.7	136.3	162.3	133.2	125.4	78.6	44.9	1,358.1
Source: Japan Meteorological Agency (1991–2020 normals, extremes 1976–present)

Climate data for Kakunodate, Semboku (elevation 56 m, 1991–2020 normals, extremes 1976–present)
Month	Jan	Feb	Mar	Apr	May	Jun	Jul	Aug	Sep	Oct	Nov	Dec	Year
Record high °C (°F)	10.0 (50.0)	18.8 (65.8)	21.8 (71.2)	30.4 (86.7)	33.3 (91.9)	34.9 (94.8)	38.1 (100.6)	38.1 (100.6)	35.8 (96.4)	29.5 (85.1)	24.3 (75.7)	17.8 (64.0)	38.1 (100.6)
Mean daily maximum °C (°F)	1.5 (34.7)	2.7 (36.9)	6.9 (44.4)	14.7 (58.5)	21.1 (70.0)	25.2 (77.4)	28.1 (82.6)	29.7 (85.5)	25.5 (77.9)	18.7 (65.7)	11.1 (52.0)	4.1 (39.4)	15.8 (60.4)
Daily mean °C (°F)	−1.6 (29.1)	−1.1 (30.0)	2.1 (35.8)	8.5 (47.3)	14.8 (58.6)	19.4 (66.9)	23.0 (73.4)	24.1 (75.4)	19.7 (67.5)	12.9 (55.2)	6.3 (43.3)	0.8 (33.4)	10.7 (51.3)
Mean daily minimum °C (°F)	−4.9 (23.2)	−4.7 (23.5)	−2.1 (28.2)	2.9 (37.2)	9.2 (48.6)	14.6 (58.3)	19.0 (66.2)	19.8 (67.6)	15.2 (59.4)	8.1 (46.6)	2.2 (36.0)	−2.1 (28.2)	6.4 (43.5)
Record low °C (°F)	−16.3 (2.7)	−16.7 (1.9)	−12.9 (8.8)	−8.8 (16.2)	−0.5 (31.1)	5.3 (41.5)	10.8 (51.4)	11.3 (52.3)	3.4 (38.1)	−0.9 (30.4)	−8.2 (17.2)	−13.0 (8.6)	−16.7 (1.9)
Average precipitation mm (inches)	171.6 (6.76)	140.5 (5.53)	135.7 (5.34)	129.1 (5.08)	148.7 (5.85)	152.3 (6.00)	273.6 (10.77)	254.9 (10.04)	180.5 (7.11)	171.5 (6.75)	202.5 (7.97)	197.8 (7.79)	2,158.4 (84.98)
Average snowfall cm (inches)	218 (86)	175 (69)	95 (37)	7 (2.8)	0 (0)	0 (0)	0 (0)	0 (0)	0 (0)	0 (0)	12 (4.7)	130 (51)	630 (248)
Average precipitation days (≥ 1.0 mm)	22.3	19.6	18.0	13.9	13.0	11.2	14.2	12.5	13.3	15.2	18.8	21.8	193.8
Mean monthly sunshine hours	50.9	69.1	108.3	155.9	187.9	176.8	149.0	183.4	150.3	135.9	90.7	54.0	1,512.2
Source: Japan Meteorological Agency (1991–2020 normals, extremes 1976–present)

== Demographics ==
Per Japanese census data, the population of Semboku peaked in the early 1960s and has since declined to pre-1920 levels.

Historical population

Year	Pop.	±% p.a.
1920	29,123	—
1930	32,017	+0.95%
1940	37,453	+1.58%
1950	43,358	+1.47%
1960	43,765	+0.09%
1970	39,216	−1.09%

Year	Pop.	±% p.a.
1980	39,098	−0.03%
1990	36,297	−0.74%
2000	33,565	−0.78%
2010	29,572	−1.26%
2020	24,610	−1.82%

== History ==
The area of present-day Semboku was part of ancient Dewa Province. During the Edo period, the area came under the control of the Satake clan, who had been relocated to Kubota Domain from their former holdings in Hitachi Province. After the start of the Meiji period, the area became part of Semboku District, Akita Prefecture in 1878. The town of Kakunodate was established on April 1, 1889 with the establishment of the modern municipalities system.

The city of Semboku was established on March 22, 2005, from the merger of the towns of Kakunodate and Tazawako, and the village of Nishiki (all from Semboku District).

== Government ==
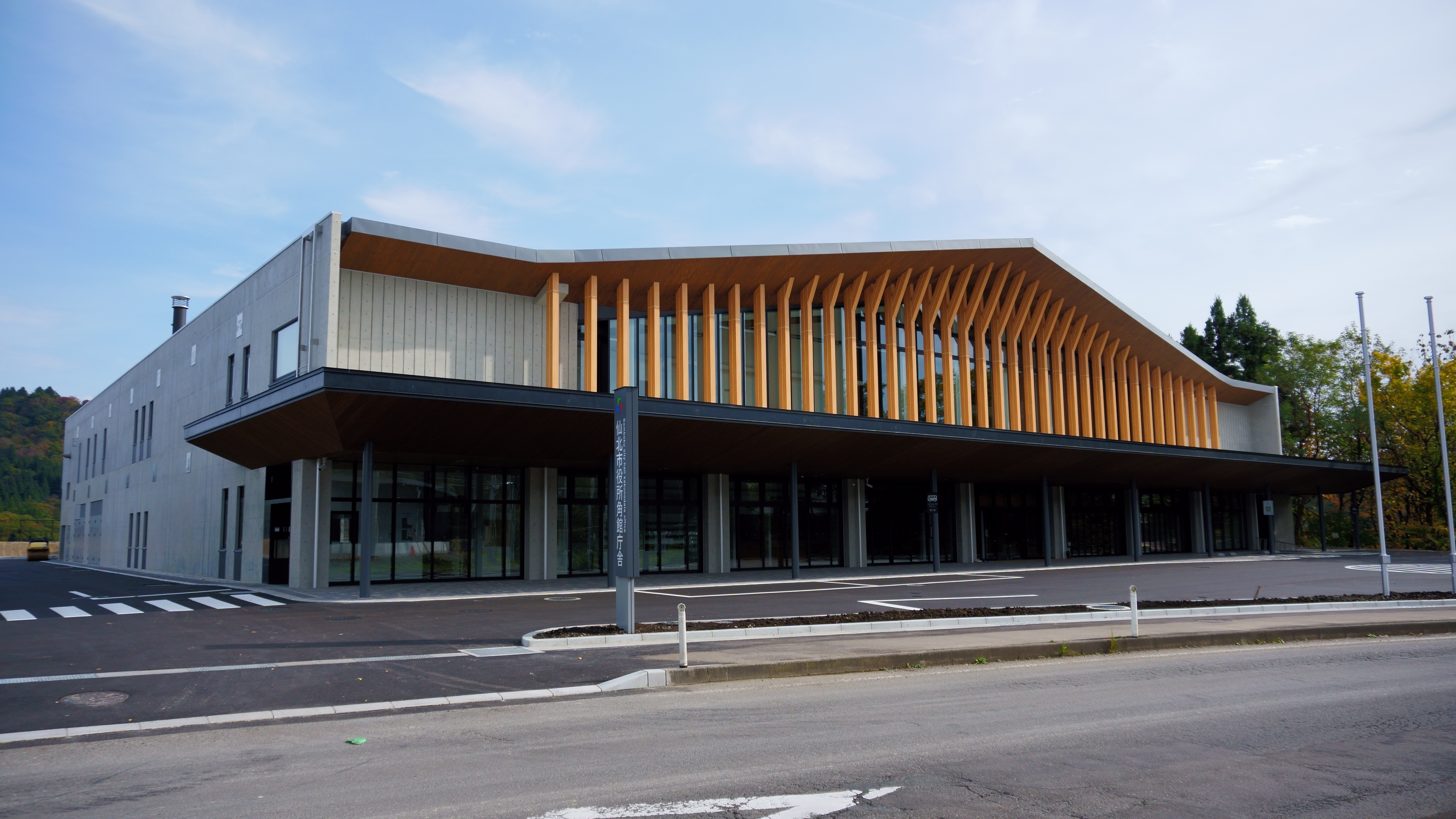
City Office Building

Semboku has a mayor-council form of government with a directly elected mayor and a unicameral city legislature of 18 members. The city contributes one member to the Akita Prefectural Assembly. In terms of national politics, the city is part of the Akita 3rd District of the lower house of the Diet of Japan.

== Economy ==
The economy of Semboku is based on agriculture, forestry and seasonal tourism. The city is a noted producer of craft beer, soy sauce and miso.

One event that attracts many tourists is the Rokugō Kamakura Festival, which is held each February 11 to 15.

== Education ==
Semboku has seven public elementary schools and five public middle schools operated by the city government and one public high school operated by the Akita Prefectural Board of Education. The prefecture also operates a special education school for the handicapped.

== Transportation ==
=== Railway ===
East Japan Railway Company - Akita Shinkansen

- Tazawako – Kakunodate

East Japan Railway Company - Tazawako Line

- Tazawako - Sashimaki - Jindai - Shōden - Kakunodate

Akita Nairiku Jūkan Railway - Akita Nairiku Line

- Tozawa - Kami-Hinokinai - Sadōri - Ugo-Nakazato - Matsuba - Ugo-Nagatoro - Yatsu - Saimyoji - Ugo-Ōta - Kakunodate

=== Highway ===
- National Route 46
- National Route 105
- National Route 341

== Local attractions ==
- Kakunodate samurai residences
- Lake Tazawa – the deepest lake in Japan
- Ōfuka Onsen
- Tamagawa Hot Spring has the highest flow rate of any hot spring in Japan at 150 liters/second, which feeds a 3 meter wide stream with a temperature of 98 degrees C. The water from Tamagawa Hot Spring is also very acidic.
- Towada-Hachimantai National Park
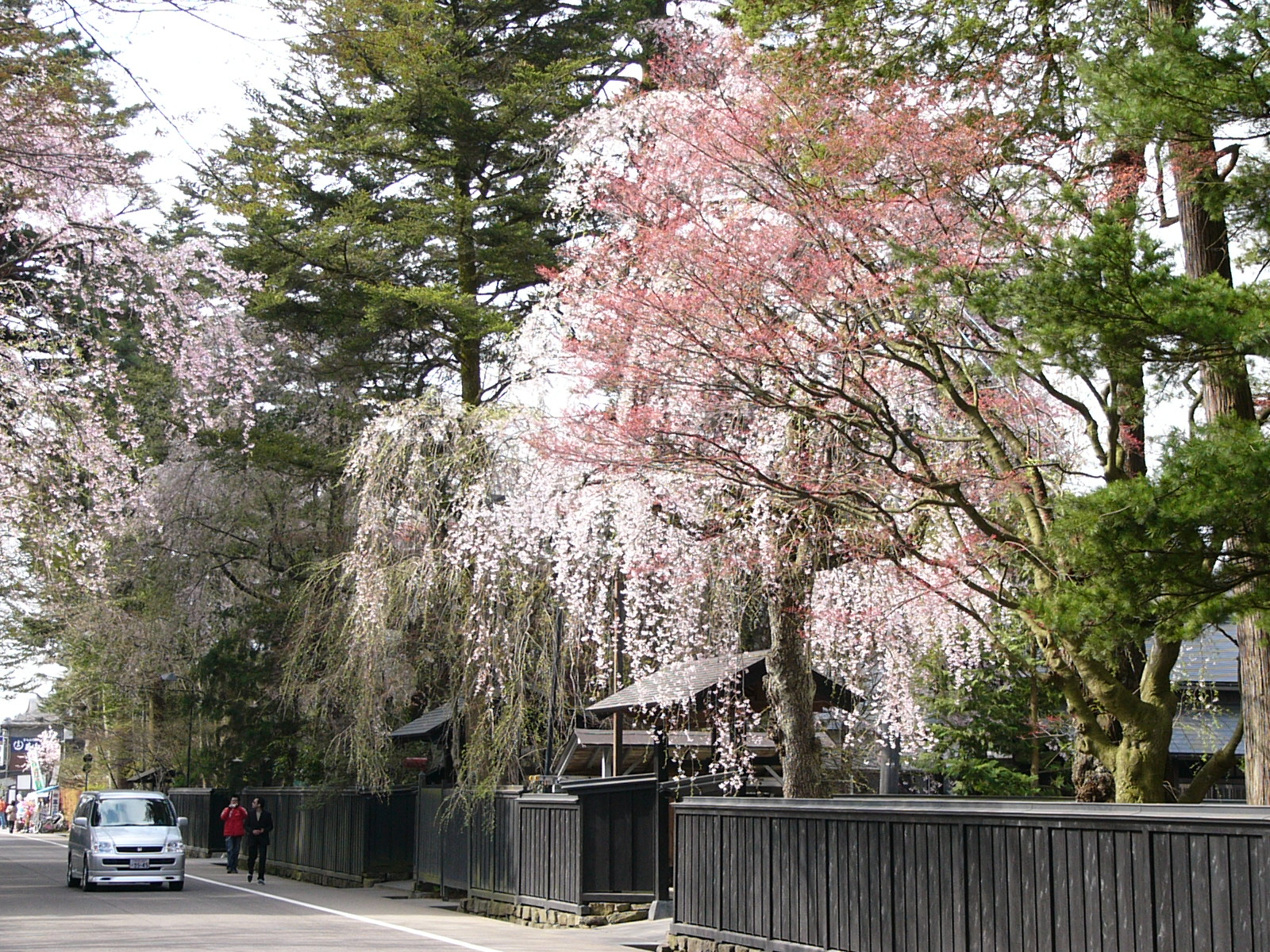
Kakunodate

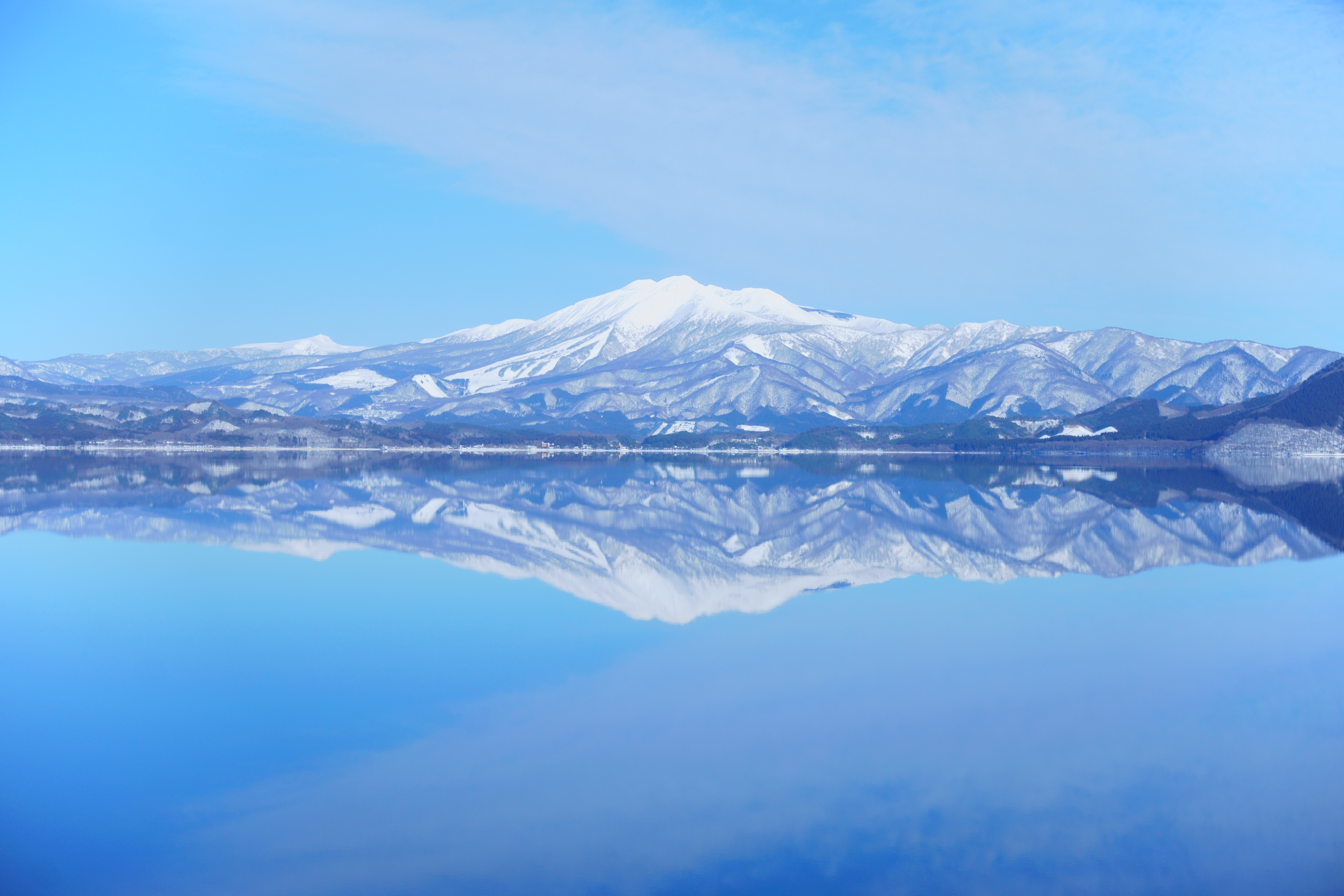
Lake Tazawa

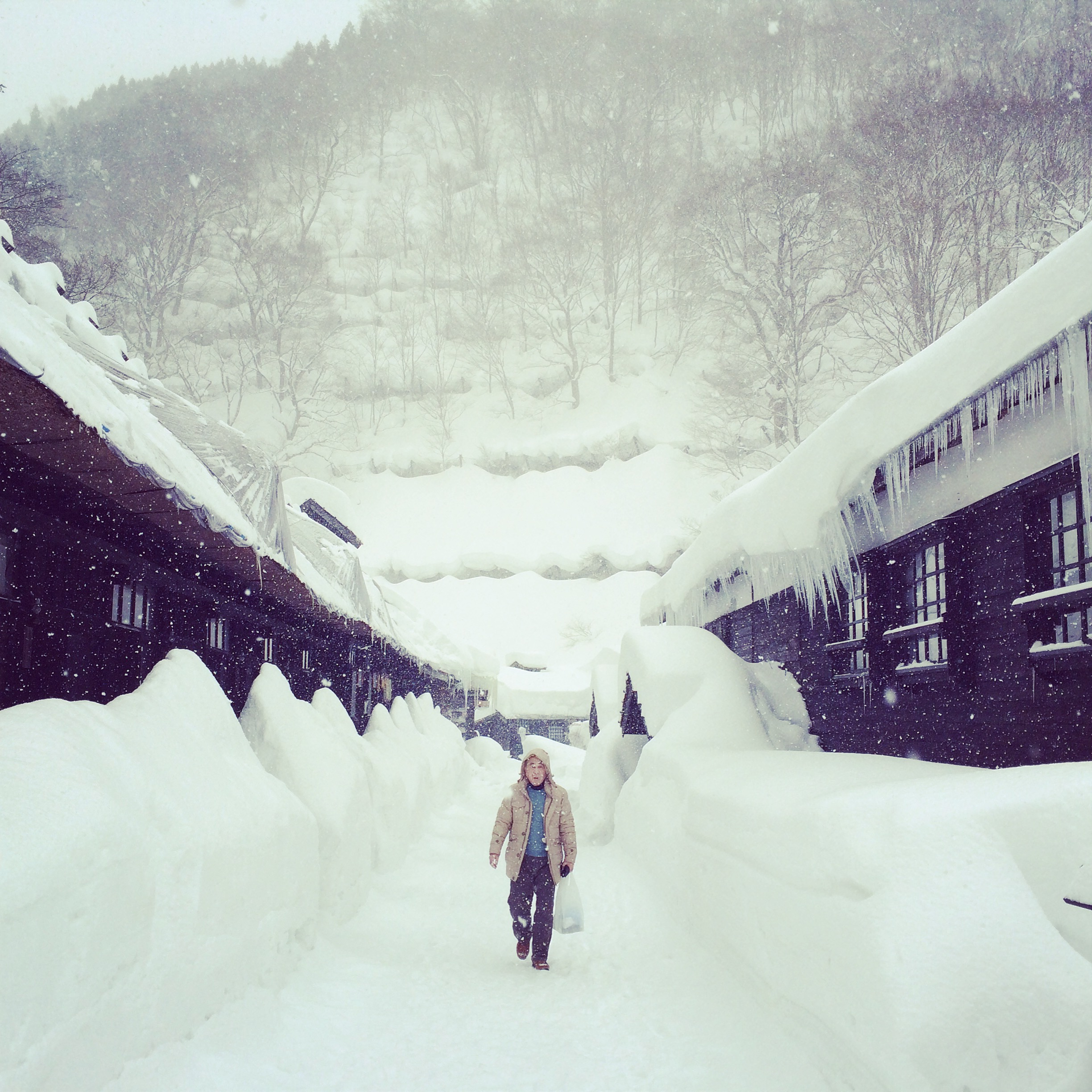
Nyūtō Onsen Tsurunoyu

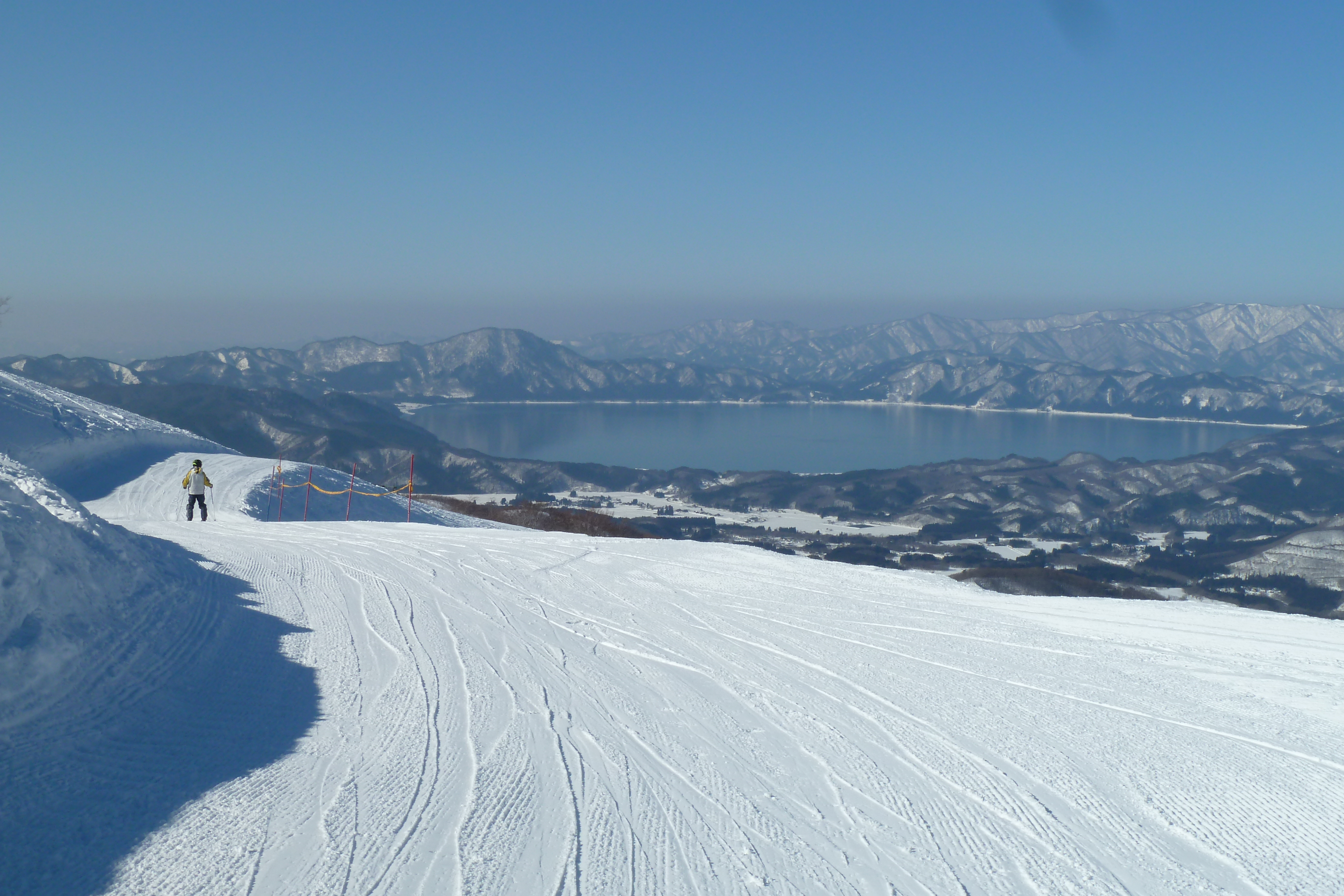
Tazawako Snow Resort

== International relations ==
=== Sister cities ===
Semboku is twinned with:

- Ōmura, Nagasaki, Japan, since July 18, 1979
- Sanuki, Kagawa, Japan, since September 28, 1996
- Shinjō, Yamagata, Japan, since July 27, 1996
- Takahagi, Ibaraki, Japan, since July 27, 1996
- Hitachiōta, Ibaraki, Japan, since November 21, 1998

== Noted people from Semboku ==
- Ayako Fuji, musician
- Norihisa Satake, politician
- Shigehiro Taguchi, basketball player
- Yasuhiko Takahashi, wheel gymnastics acrobat
