= Ōfuka Onsen =

Hot spring in Akita Prefecture, Japan

Coordinates: 39°58′17.5″N 140°49′0.9″E

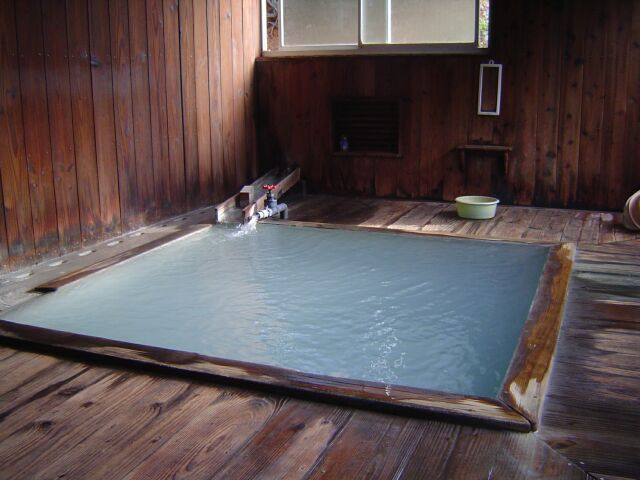
Ōfuka Onsen

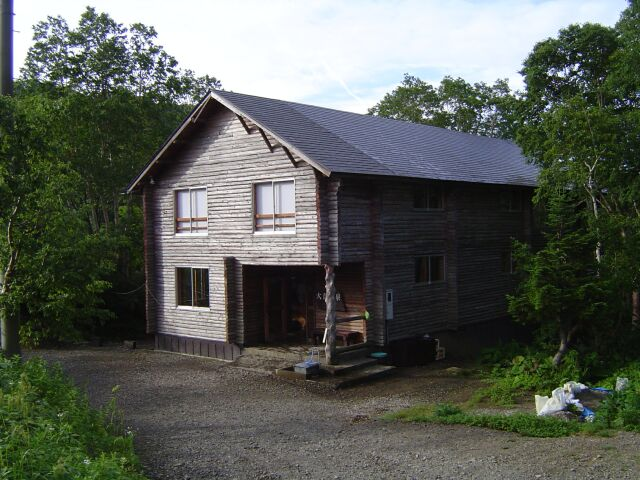

Ōfuka onsen (大深温泉, Ōfuka onsen) is an onsen (hot spring) in Semboku, Akita, Japan. It is closed as of 2025 with no confirmed reopening date.

== See also ==
- Onsen
