= Tazawako, Akita =

Dissolved municipality in Akita prefecture, Japan

Tazawako (田沢湖町, Tazawako-machi) was a town located in Senboku District, Akita Prefecture, Japan.

== Population ==
In 2003, the town had an estimated population of 12,471 and a density of 18.56 persons per km^{2}. The total area was 672.06 km^{2}.

== History ==
On September 20, 2005, Tazawako, along with the town of Kakunodate, and the village of Nishiki (all from Senboku District), was merged to create the city of Semboku.

== Attractions ==
Eponymous Lake Tazawa is the deepest lake in Japan at 423 meters. The town has several popular onsen.

== Access ==
The area is served by Tazawako Station, which is served by the Akita Shinkansen and the Tazawako Line.
