= Lake Tazawa =

Caldera lake in northern Japan

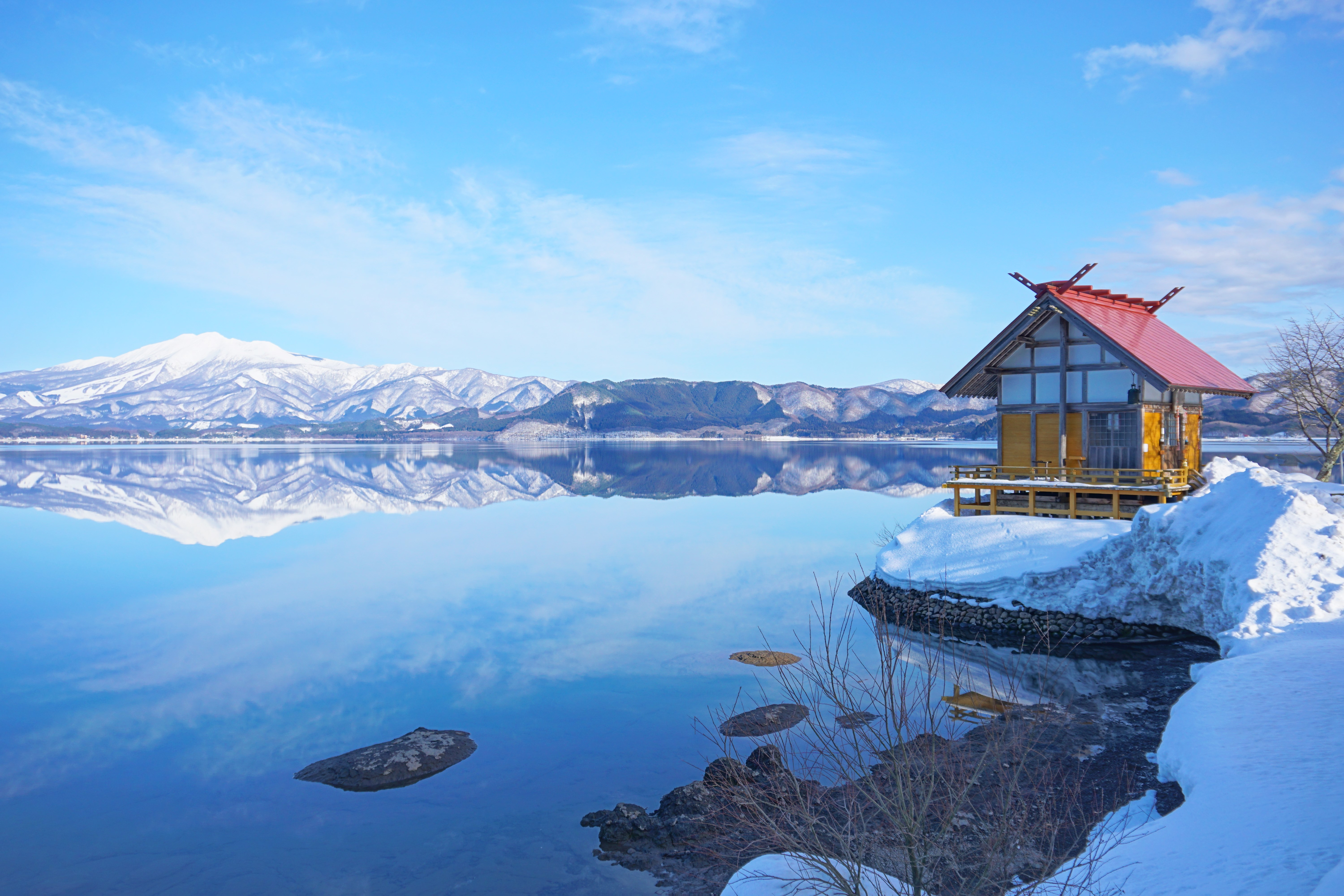
- Kansa Shrine and Lake Tazawa in 2021

- Location within Japan
- Location: Semboku, Akita Prefecture
- Coordinates: 39°43′30″N 140°39′41″E
- Lake type: crater lake (?)
- Primary inflows: no natural inflow
- Primary outflows: no natural outflow
- Basin countries: Japan
- Surface area: 25.9 km^{2} (10.0 sq mi)
- Average depth: 280.0 m (918.6 ft)
- Max. depth: 423.4 m (1,389 ft)
- Water volume: 7.2 km^{3} (1.7 cu mi)
- Shore length^{1}: 20 kilometres (12 mi)
- Surface elevation: 249 m (817 ft)
- ^{1} Shore length is not a well-defined measure.

Lake Tazawa (田沢湖, Tazawa-ko) is a caldera lake in the city of Semboku, Akita Prefecture, northern Japan. It is the deepest lake in Japan at 423 metres (1,388 ft). The area is a popular vacation area and several hot spring resorts can be found in the hills above the lake. Akita Prefecture's largest ski area, Tazawako Ski Area [ja], overlooks the lake.

== Hydrology ==
Lake Tazawa has a surface elevation of 249 meters, and its deepest point is 174.4 meters below sea level. Due to this depth, there is no possibility that the lake will freeze in the dead of winter. At 423 metres (1,388 ft), it is slightly deeper than Lake Shikotsu in Hokkaido (363 meters), and is the 37th deepest lake in the world. Lake Tazawa has no natural inflow or outflow, and in 1931, had a measured transparency of 31 meters, comparable with Lake Mashū, but with abundant aquatic organisms. However, due to the construction of hydroelectric power plant facilities and agricultural runoff, transparency has been reduced to less than 4 meters, and by the late 1940s, the lake had become so acidic (pH 4.3) that it could no longer support irrigated agriculture. Starting in 1972, the Japanese government has been attempting to rectify the acidity problem through the introduction of lime, with a new facility completed in 1991. However, in the year 2000, the lake still had an acidity of 5.14 at the 200 meter depth, and 4.91 at the 400 meter depth, indicating that full recovery has not yet been achieved.

== Geology ==
Due to its extreme depth, and almost circular profile, Lake Tazawa was considered to be either a caldera lake caused by volcanic activity or a crater lake caused by a meteorite impact. The depth of the lake was first measured as 397 meters, using a hemp rope, by Japanese geologist Tanaka Akamaro in 1909. The Akita Prefectural Fisheries Experiment Station survey indicated a depth of 413 meters in 1926 using a wire rope. During a three-year survey from 1937 to 1940, geologist Yoshimura Nobuyoshi surveyed the lake bottom, finding the deepest point to be 425 metres (1,394 ft). The survey also found two small volcanic cones and sedimentation deposits to the depth of around one kilometer on the north-west side of the lake bottom. These findings lend credence to the theory that the lake is indeed of volcanic origin, from an explosive eruption of 1.4 million years ago.

== Natural history ==
Prior to 1940, the main species of fish in Lake Tazawa included the indigenous kunimasu (Oncorhynchus nerka kawamurae), Sockeye salmon, Japanese dace (genus Tribolodon), Japanese trout, char, carp, catfish and eel. However, after the acidic content of the lake changed in 1940, the only surviving fish is the dace, while most of the other species, including the kunimasu, are thought to have gone extinct.

== History ==
Lake Tazawa was named in the Meiji period when its surrounding foothills were settled. However, the lake was known to the Ainu people, and the name “Tazawa” is thought to be derived from the Ainu language Tapukopu ("hill with a raised circular top")

The lake is also connected with the legendary maiden of beauty, Tatsuko, itself of unknown origin. Tazawa has a bronze statue of Tatsuko near its shore. Tatsuko, wishing for undying youth and beauty, is said to have been turned into a lake-goddess. The statue of Tatsuko by Yasutake Funakoshi stands with her back to the clear blue waters, a figure of pureness and beauty, and was unveiled on May 12, 1968.

== Gallery ==
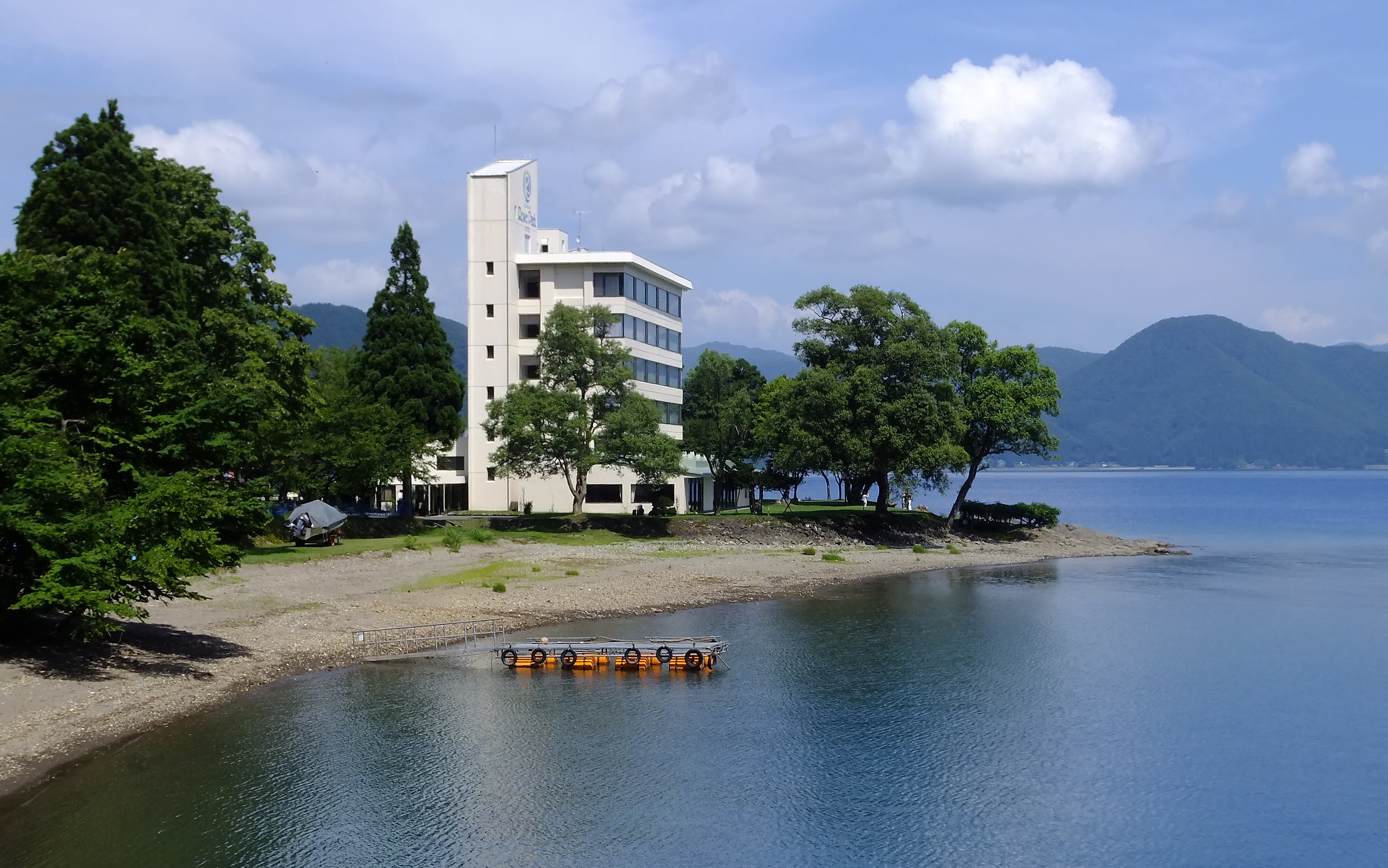
Hotel near the lake

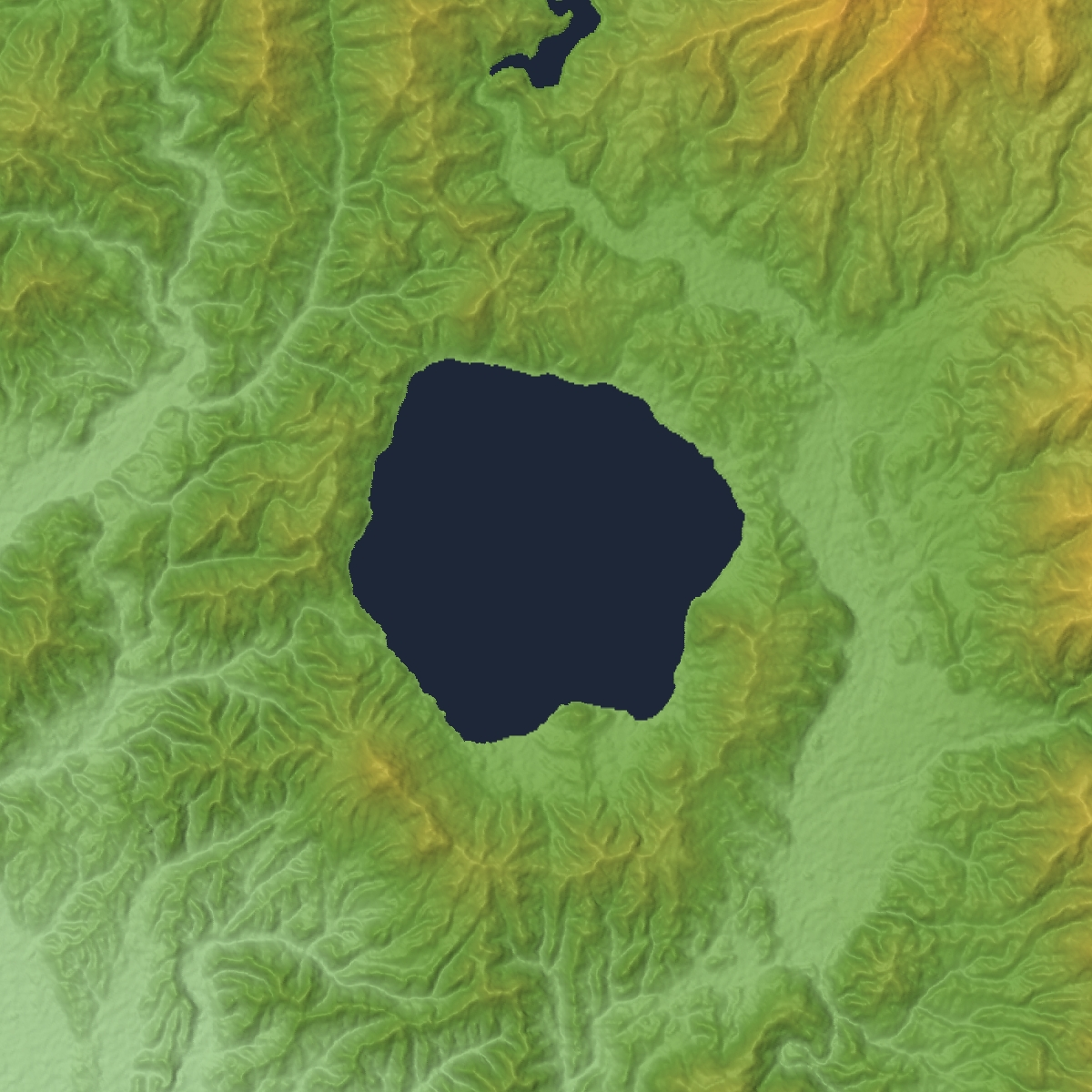
Relief map

Near and far scenes of Lake Tazawa

== See also ==
- List of lakes in Japan
- List of volcanoes in Japan
