= Kakunodate Station =

Railway station in Semboku, Akita Prefecture, Japan

Kakunodate Station 角館駅
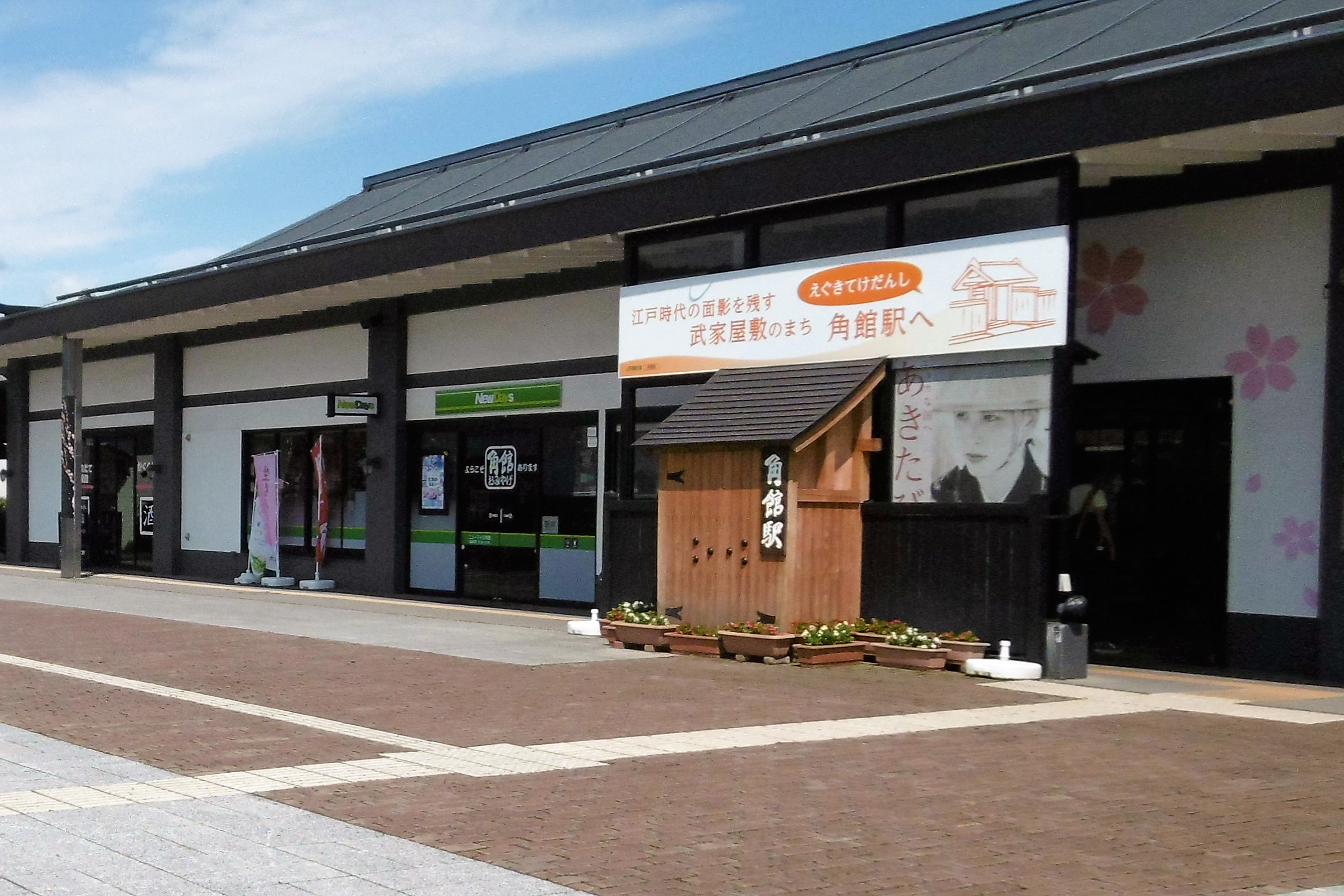
- Kakunodate Station, in July 2017

General information
- Location: Nakasugazawa-14 Kakunodatemachi, Semboku-shi, Akita-ken 014-0368; Japan
- Coordinates: 39°35′30.2″N 140°34′15.6″E
- Operator: JR East; Akita Nairiku Jūkan Railway
- Lines: Akita Shinkansen; Tazawako Line; ■ Akita Nairiku Line
- Platforms: 2 side + 1 island platforms

Other information
- Status: Staffed (Midori no Madoguchi)

History
- Opened: 30 July 1921; 105 years ago

Passengers
- FY2018: 545 daily (JR East), 128 (Akita Nairiku)

Services
Preceding station	JR East	Following station
Ōmagari towards Akita	Akita Shinkansen Komachi	Tazawako towards Tokyo
Uguisuno towards Ōmagari	Tazawako Line	Shōden towards Morioka
Preceding station	Akita Nairiku Jūkan Railway	Following station
Terminus	Akita Nairiku Line Express Moriyoshi	Saimyoji towards Takanosu
Terminus	Akita Nairiku Line Local	Ugo-Ōta towards Takanosu
Location
- Location within Akita Prefecture Location within Japan

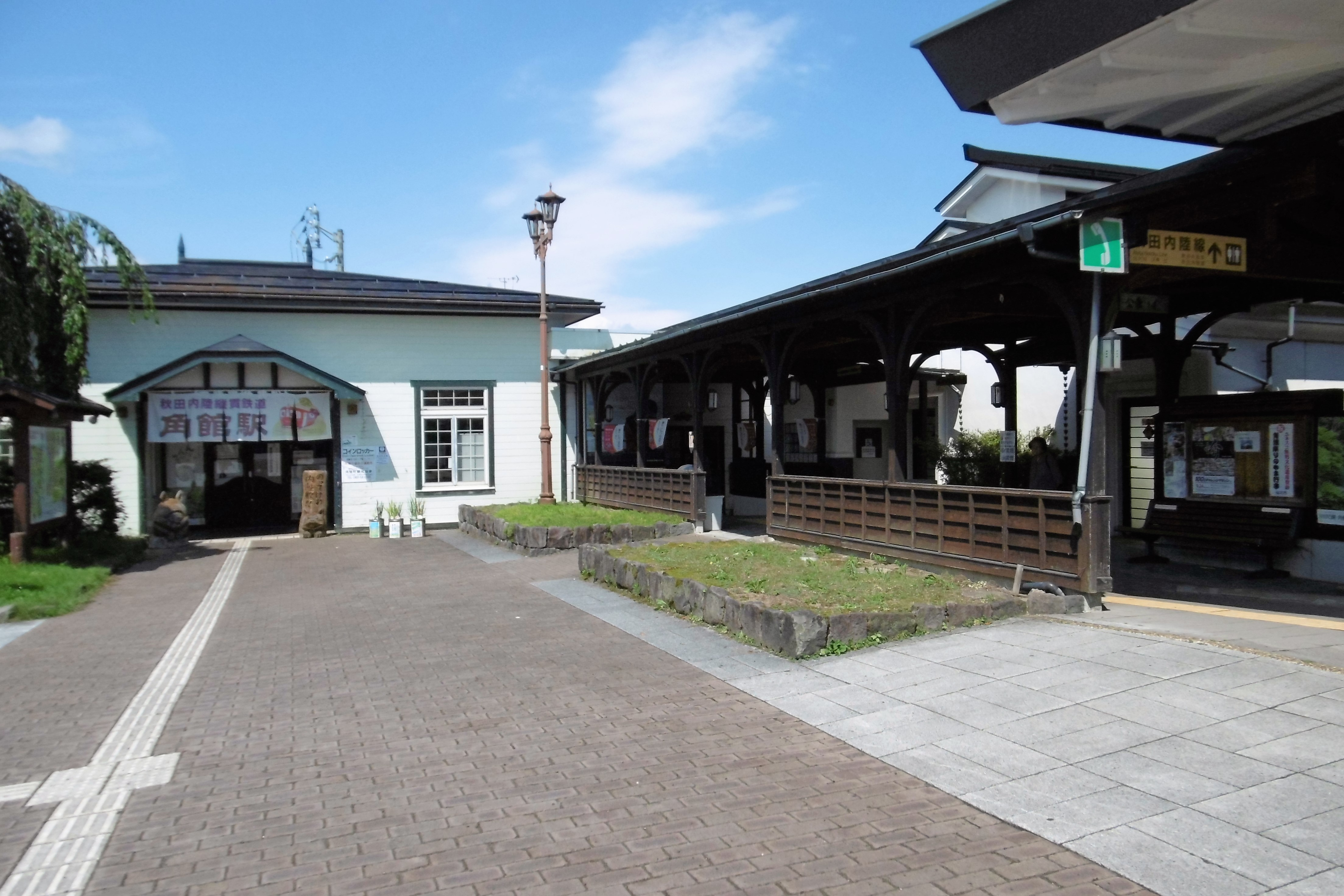
Akita Nairiku Railway Kakunodate Station

Kakunodate Station (角館駅, Kakunodate-eki) is an interchange railway station in the city of Semboku, Akita Prefecture, Japan, operated by East Japan Railway Company (JR East).

== Lines ==
Kakunodate Station is served by the JR East Tazawako Line and the Akita Shinkansen, and is located 58.8 km from the terminus of both lines at Morioka Station. It is also the southern terminus for the third sector Akita Nairiku Jūkan Railway Akita Nairiku Line and is located 92.4 kilometers from the northern terminus at Takanosu

== Station layout ==
The station consists of a single side platform and an island platform serving the JR portion of the station, and a single side platform for the Akita Nairuke Railway. The station building, designed to resemble a samurai residence, was selected to be one of the "Hundred Stations of Tohoku". The station has a Midori no Madoguchi staffed ticket office.

=== Platforms (JR) ===
1	■ Tazawako Line	for Morioka
	■ Akita Shinkansen	for Morioka
2	■ Tazawako Line	for Akita
	■ Akita Shinkansen	for Akita
3	■ Tazawako Line	for bidirectional traffic

=== Platforms (Akita Nairiku) ===
1	■ Akita Nairiku Line	for Takanosu

== History ==
Kakunodate Station opened on July 30, 1921 as a station on the Obonai Railway, which was nationalized into the Japanese Government Railways (JGR) the following year. The JGR became Japan National Railways (JNR) after World War II. The Kakunodate Line (which later became the Akita Nairiku Railway) began operation from November 1, 1971. The station was absorbed into the JR East network upon the privatization of the JNR on April 1, 1987. Services on the Akita Shinkansen began on March 22, 1997.

== Passenger statistics ==
In fiscal 2018, the station was used by an average of 545 passengers daily (boarding passengers only).

== Surrounding area ==
- former Samurai residences (buke yashiki)
- former Kakunodate town hall
- Kakunodate Post Office
- National Route 105

== See also ==
- List of railway stations in Japan
