= Nishiki, Akita =

Dissolved municipality in Akita prefecture, Japan

Nishiki (西木村, Nishiki-mura) was a village located in Senboku District, Akita Prefecture, Japan.

In 2003, the village had an estimated population of 5,793 and a density of 21.86 persons per km^{2}. The total area was 264.95 km^{2}.

On September 20, 2005, Nishiki, along with the towns of Kakunodate and Tazawako (all from Senboku District), was merged to create the city of Semboku.
