= Gotō Chūgai =

- 後藤 宙外
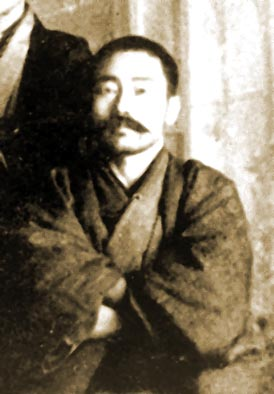
- Born: Gotō Toranosuke; 23 December 1866; Daisen, Akita Japan
- Died: 12 June 1938 (aged 71); Aizuwakamatsu, Fukushima Japan
- Occupations: essayist, literary critic
- Writing career
- Language: Japanese

Gotō Toranosuke (23 December 1866 – 12 June 1938), known by his pen name Gotō Chūgai (後藤 宙外), was a Japanese writer and literary critic active from the late Meiji through the early Shōwa periods of Japan.

== Biography ==
Born in the rural Senboku District of Akita prefecture (in what is now the city of Daisen), Gotō graduated from the Tokyo Semmon Gakko (present-day Waseda University). From 1900, he served as editor of the literary magazine Shinshōsetsu ("New Fiction"). Some of the writers who contributed to the magazine during his tenure were members of the Ken'yūsha literary society, including Hirotsu Ryurō, Kyōka Izumi, Shimazaki Toson, Natsume Sōseki and Nagai Kafū. He was strongly critical of the naturalism movement, which began to become popular around that time. His works include a novella, Funikudan (1899), and a collection of essays, Hi shizen shugi (1908).

== See also ==
- Japanese literature
- List of Japanese authors
