= Jingūji Station =

Railway station in Daisen, Akita Prefecture, Japan

Jingūji Station 神宮寺駅
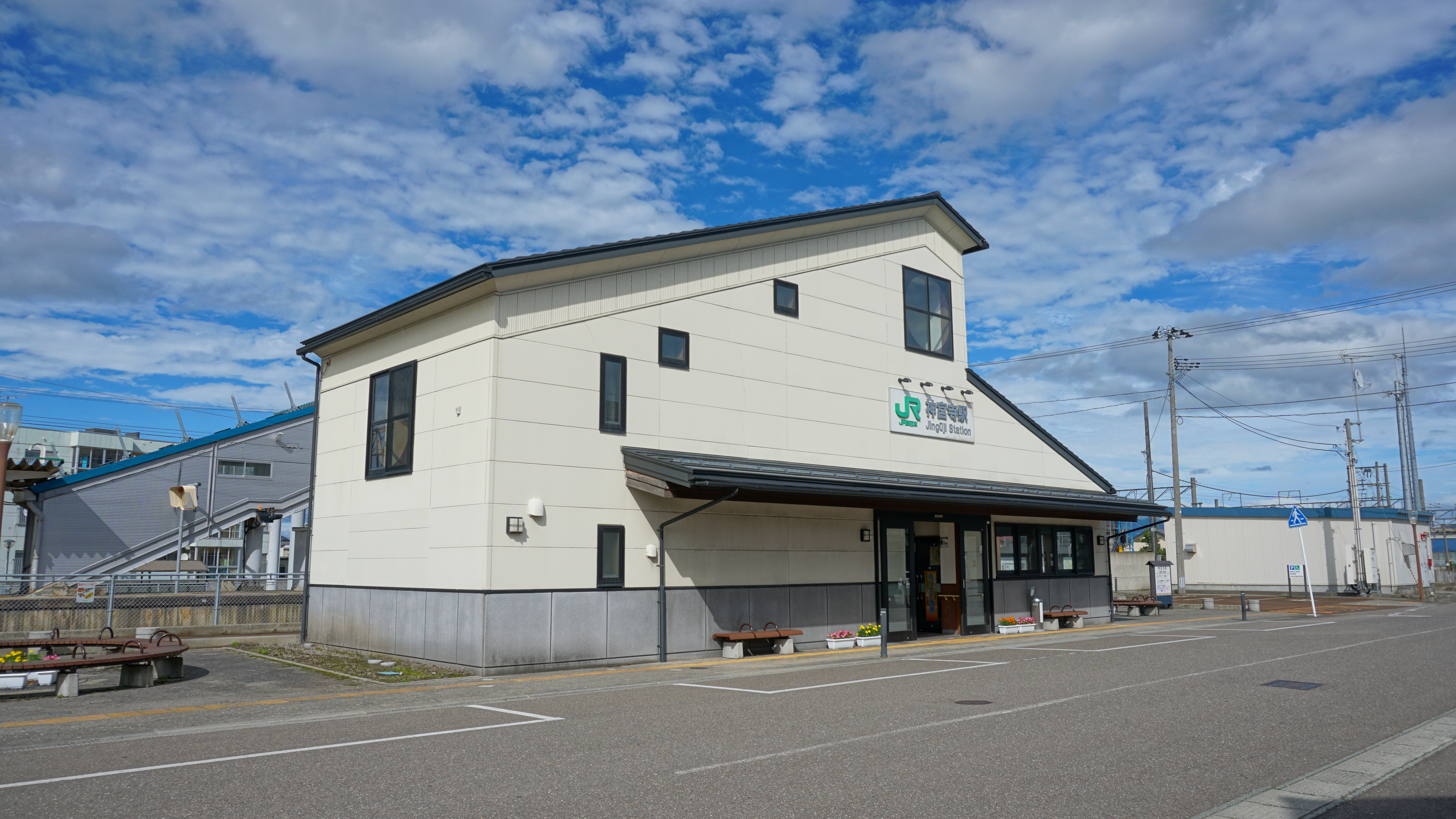
- Jingūji Station in June 2019

General information
- Location: Hongōno-21 Jingūji, Daisen-shi, Akita-ken 019-1701; Japan
- Coordinates: 39°29′41.8″N 140°25′34.7″E
- Operator: JR East
- Line: ■ Ōu Main Line
- Distance: 253.0 kilometers from Fukushima
- Platforms: 1 island platform

Other information
- Status: Staffed
- Website: Official website

History
- Opened: August 21, 1904

Passengers
- FY2018: 202 daily

Services
Preceding station	JR East	Following station
Ōmagari towards Shinjō	Ōu Main Line Local	Kariwano towards Aomori
Location
- Location within Akita Prefecture Location within Japan

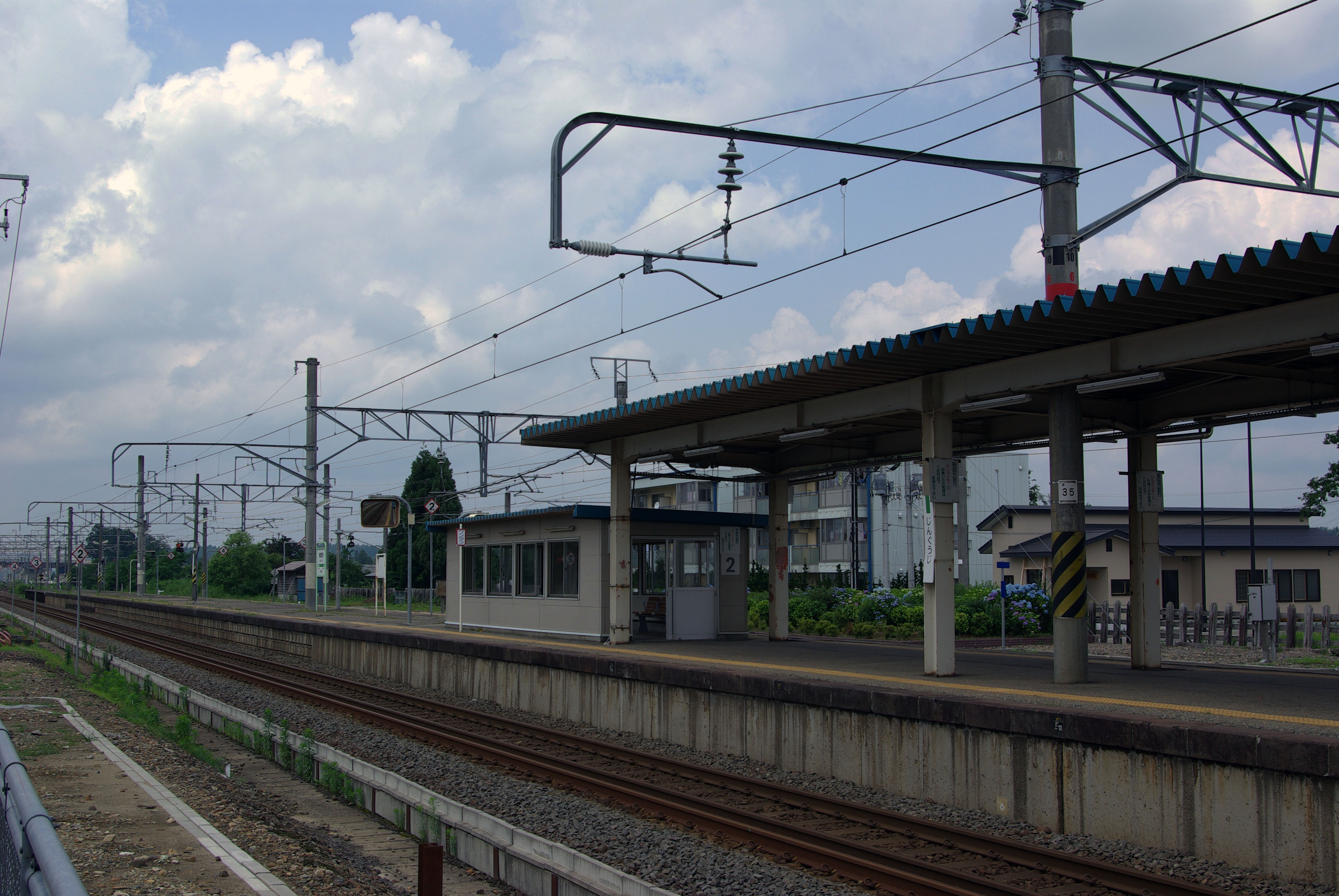
Platform

Jingūji Station (神宮寺駅, Jingūji-eki) is a JR East railway station located in the city of Daisen, Akita Prefecture, Japan.

== Lines ==
Jingūji Station is served by the Ōu Main Line, and is located 253.0 km from the terminus of the line at Fukushima Station.

== Station layout ==
Jingūji Station consists of a single ground-level island platform, with the tracks a Platform 1 dual gauge for use by through traffic of the Akita Shinkansen. The platform is connected to the station building by a footbridge. The station is staffed.

=== Platforms ===
1	■ Ōu Main Line	for Akita
2	■ Ōu Main Line	for Yokote and Ōmagari

== History ==
Jingūji Station was opened on August 21, 1904 on the Japanese Government Railways (JGR), serving the town of Kamioka, Akita. The JGR became the Japan National Railways (JNR) after World War II. The station was absorbed into the JR East network upon the privatization of the JNR on April 1, 1987. A new station building was completed in July 2008.

== Passenger statistics ==
In fiscal 2018, the station was used by an average of 202 passengers daily (boarding passengers only).

== Surrounding area ==
- former Kamioka Town Hall
- Jingūji post office
- National Route 13
