= Misato Rokugo Velodrome =

Velodrome in Misato, Akita, Japan

Coordinates: 39.415083°N 140.562056°E

- Rokugo Velodrome
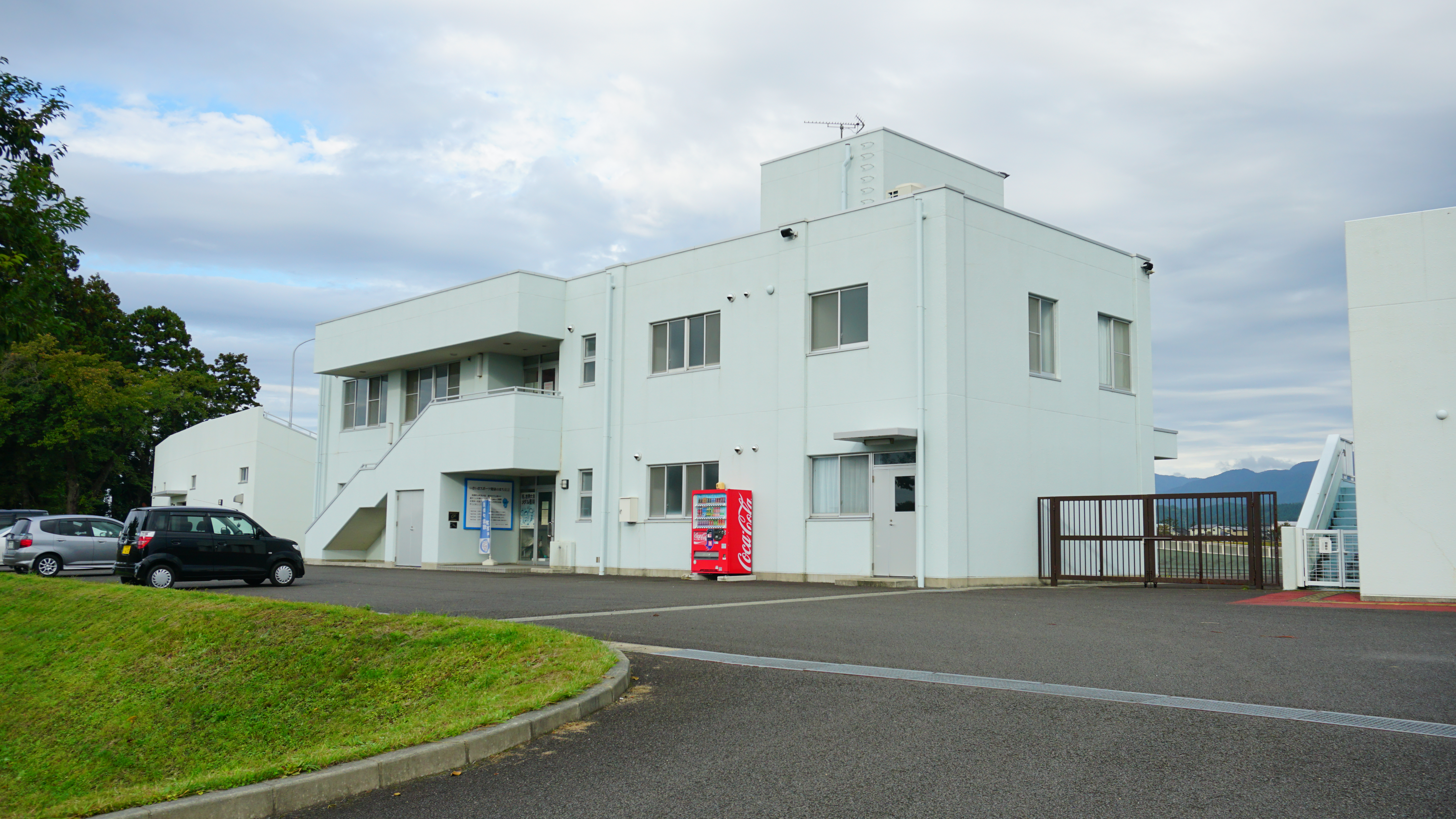
- Interactive map of Misato Rokugo Velodrome
- Location: Misato, Akita, Japan
- Operator: Misato Sports Promotion Agency

Construction
- Opened: September 2004

Misato Rokugo Velodrome (美郷町六郷自転車競技場, Misatocho Rokugo Jitensha Kyogijo) is a velodrome located in Misato, Akita. Rokugo's oval is 333 meters in circumference.

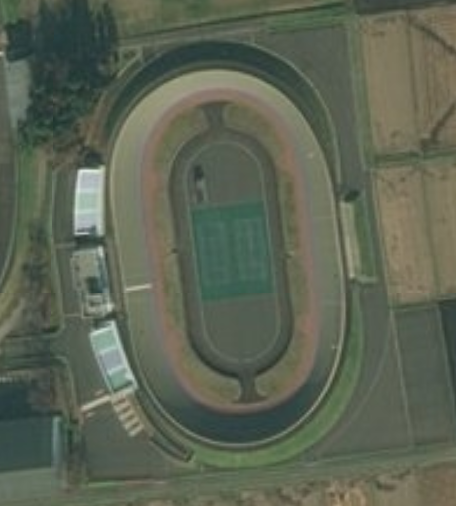
Satellite view
