= Former Ikeda Family Gardens =

Coordinates: 39°27′22.0″N 140°30′36.0″E

- 旧池田氏庭園
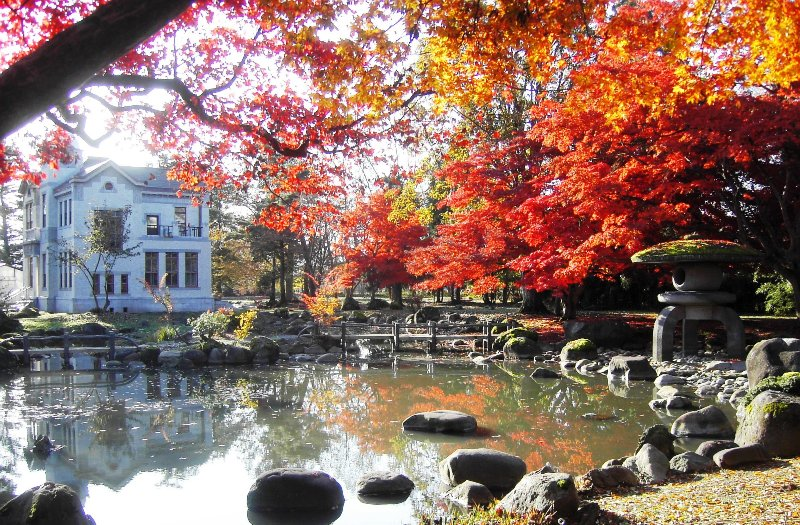
- Ikeda Family Gardens

- Location within Akita Prefecture Location within Japan
- Type: Urban park
- Location: Daisen, Akita, Japan
- Area: 42,000 hectares (100,000 acres)
- Created: late Meiji period
- Operator: Daisen city
- National Palace of Scenic Beauty Important Cultural Property of Japan

The Former Ikeda Family Gardens (旧池田氏庭園) is a Japanese landscape garden and nationally designated Place of Scenic Beauty in the city of Daisen, Akita Prefecture, Japan. The garden contains a western-style mansion (now a library), which is an Important Cultural Property of Japan. The gardens are located 15 minutes by car from Ōmagari Station on the Akita Shinkansen.

== Overview ==
The Ikeda family were originally samurai from Settsu Province, who settled in Dewa Province sometime in the early Edo period, becoming landowners and farmers. By the time of the Meiji restoration, they had amassed a considerable fortune, were noted patrons of the arts, and were regarded as one of the three largest landowners in the Tōhoku region of Japan. Ikeda Jinnosuke (1845-1901) was the 12th head of the family and was appointed to a seat in the first session of the House of Peers as one of Japan's largest taxpayers. He was also the first chairman of the Bank of Akita. His son, Ikeda Bunnosuke (1868-1927) continued to expand the family's landholdings and wealth, and was known for his charitable works. His grandson, Ikeda Bunichirō (1893-1943) built libraries, and sponsored the archaeological investigation of the Hotta-no-saku ruins, which led to the discovery of Akita's first National Historic Site. In 2007, the Ikeda family donated the gardens and mansion to the city of Daisen.

=== Gardens ===
The Ikeda Family Gardens cover an area of 42,000 square meters, and have views of the Ōu Mountains and Mount Chōkai and is surrounded by rice fields. The entire garden is surrounded by a moat, embankment and stone wall. It is uncertain when the garden was first laid out, but the property had been the residence of the Ikeda family for many generations, and the gardens were completely remodeled after a large earthquake in 1896 by the noted gardener Nagaoka Yasuhira. The gardens are laid out as a walking garden around a large pond. Care was taken to incorporate a large number of exotic plants, forming what is almost a botanical garden. One highlight of the large is a huge Yukimi-dōrō stone lantern made from stone from the Oga Peninsula, with a diameter of four meters. The gardens were designated a National Place of Scenic Beauty in 2004.

=== Mansion ===
The western-style mansion was designed by local architect Keisuke Imamura as the residence of the Ikeda family and was completed in 1923. It is the first building in Akita Prefecture to be built of reinforced concrete. The building has two stories with an Ionic columned portico and is decorated in marble and white ceramic tiles. The interior has imported marble columns, and wallpaper made from Japanese leather paper with embossed gold leaf decorations. The buildongwas repaired from 2007 to 2010, and was designed a National Important Cultural Property in 2017.

== Gallery ==
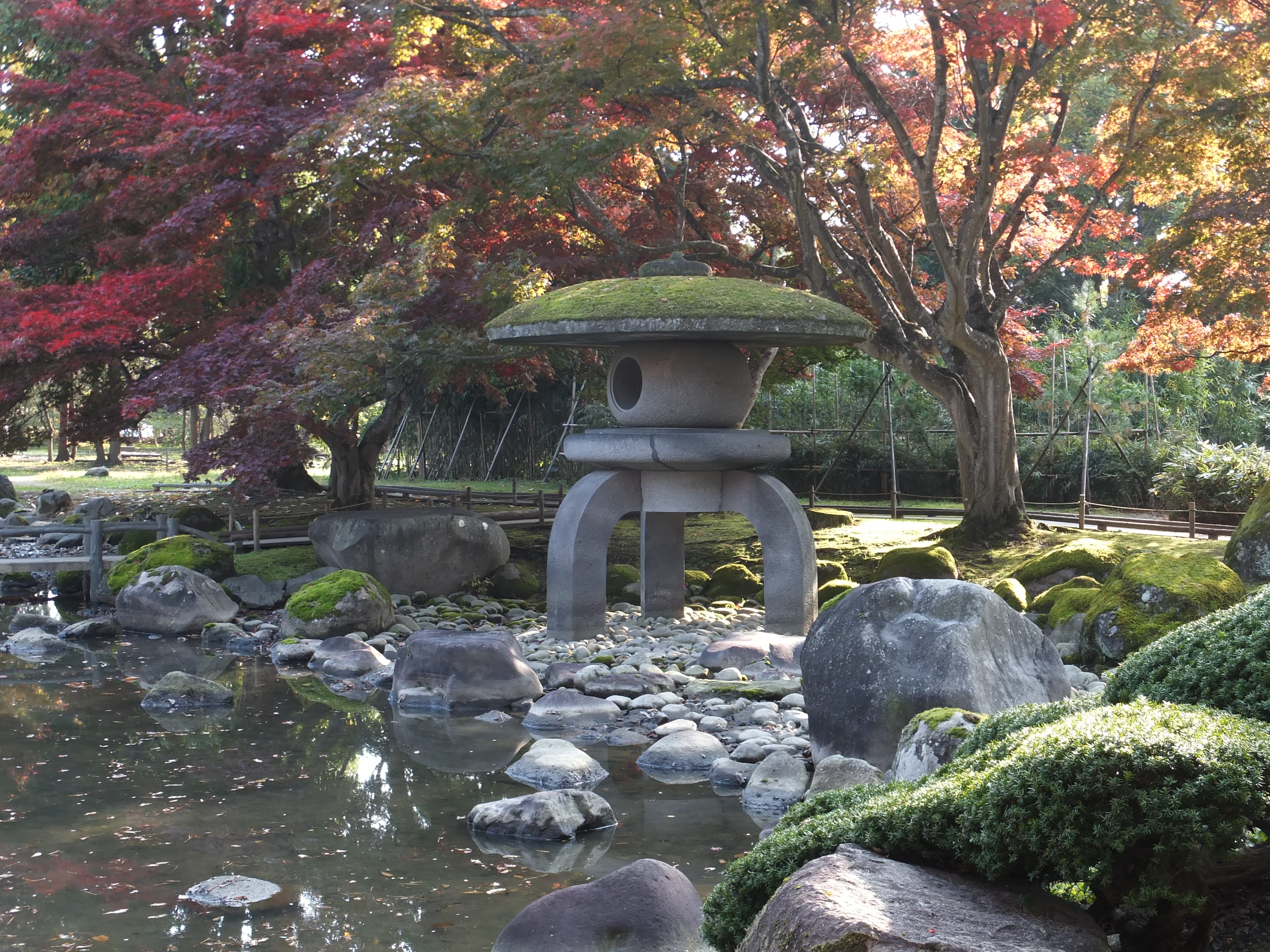
Yukimi-dōrō

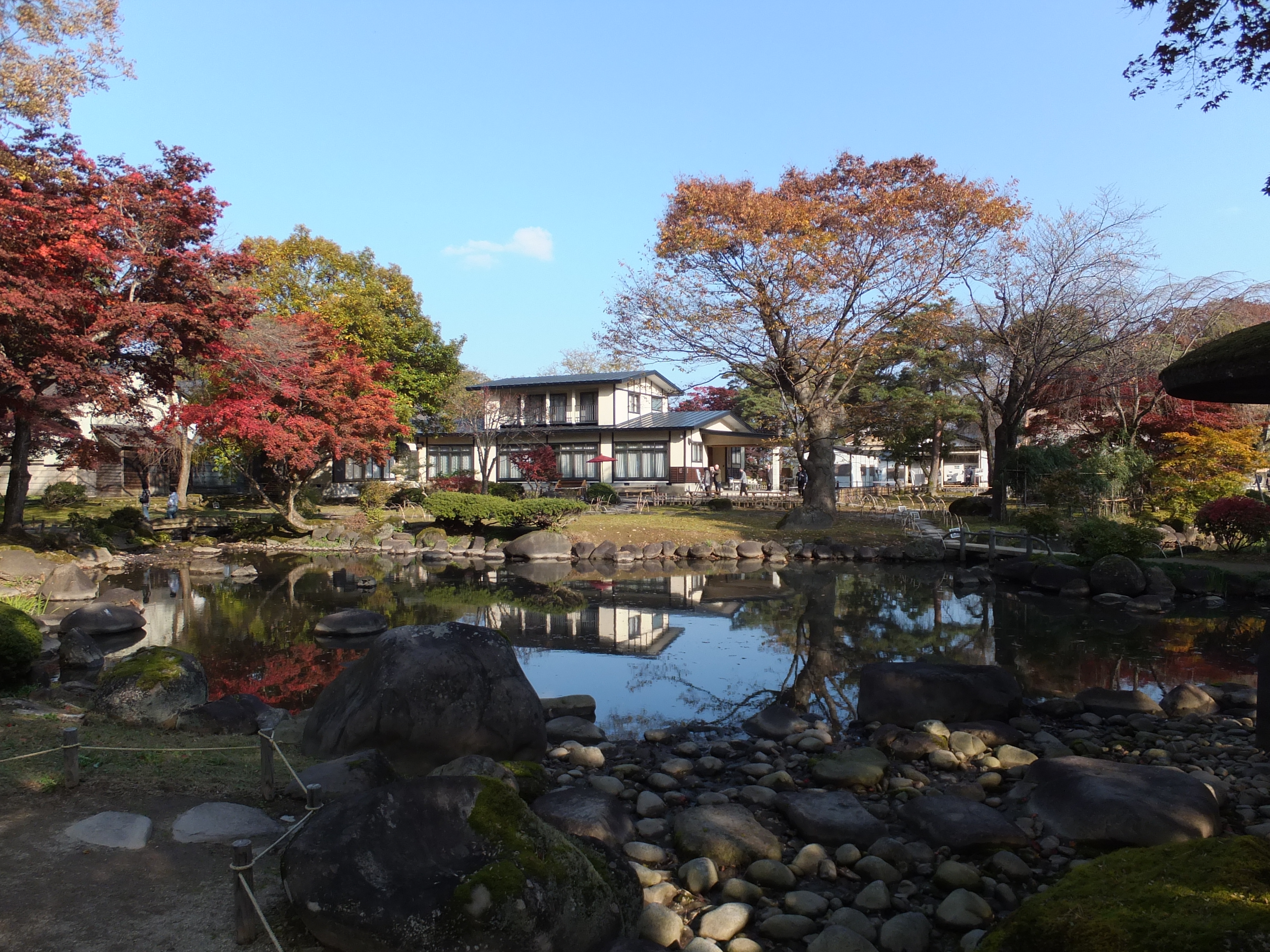
Gardens and Mansion

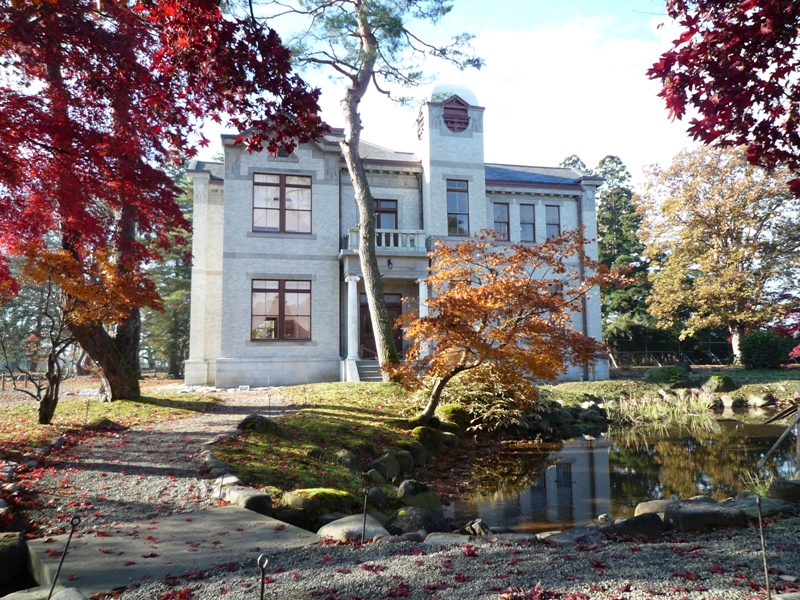
mansion

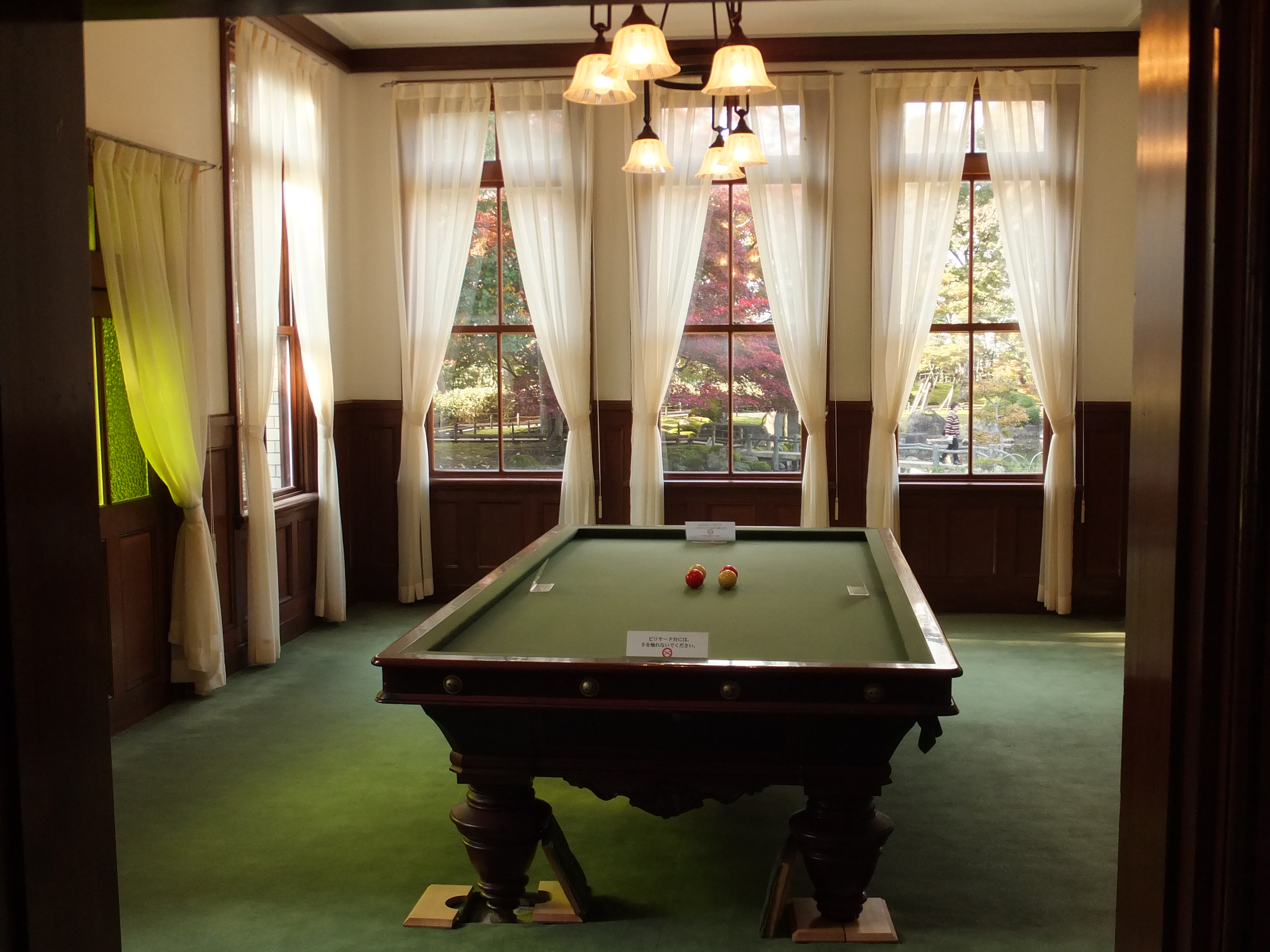
inside the mansion

Japanese leather paper wallpaper

== See also ==
- List of Places of Scenic Beauty of Japan (Akita)
