= Kyōwa, Akita =

Kyōwa 協和町
- Former settlement
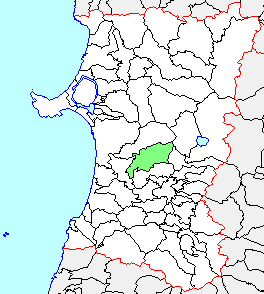
- Interactive map of Kyōwa
- Country: Japan
- Prefecture: Akita
- District: Senboku

Kyōwa (協和町, Kyōwa-machi) was a town located in Senboku District, Akita Prefecture, Japan.

In 2003, the town had an estimated population of 8,948 and a density of 36.12 persons per km^{2}. The total area was 247.74 km^{2}.

On March 22, 2005, Kyōwa, along with the city of Ōmagari; the towns of Kamioka, Nakasen, Nishisenboku, Ōta and Semboku; and the village of Nangai (all from Senboku District), merged to create the city of Daisen.

== Noted people from Kyowa ==
- Hitoshi Okuda
