= Senboku, Akita (town) =

Dissolved municipality in Akita prefecture, Japan

Senboku (仙北町, Senboku-machi) was a town located in Senboku District, Akita Prefecture, Japan.

In 2003, the town had an estimated population of 7,803 and a density of 145.54 persons per km^{2}. The total area was 29.55 km^{2}.

On March 22, 2005, Senboku, along with the city of Ōmagari; the towns of Kamioka, Kyōwa, Nakasen, Nishisenboku, Ōta; and the village of Nangai (all from Senboku District), merged to create the city of Daisen.
