= Ugo-Sakai Station =

Railway station in Daisen, Akita Prefecture, Japan

Ugo-Sakai Station 羽後境駅
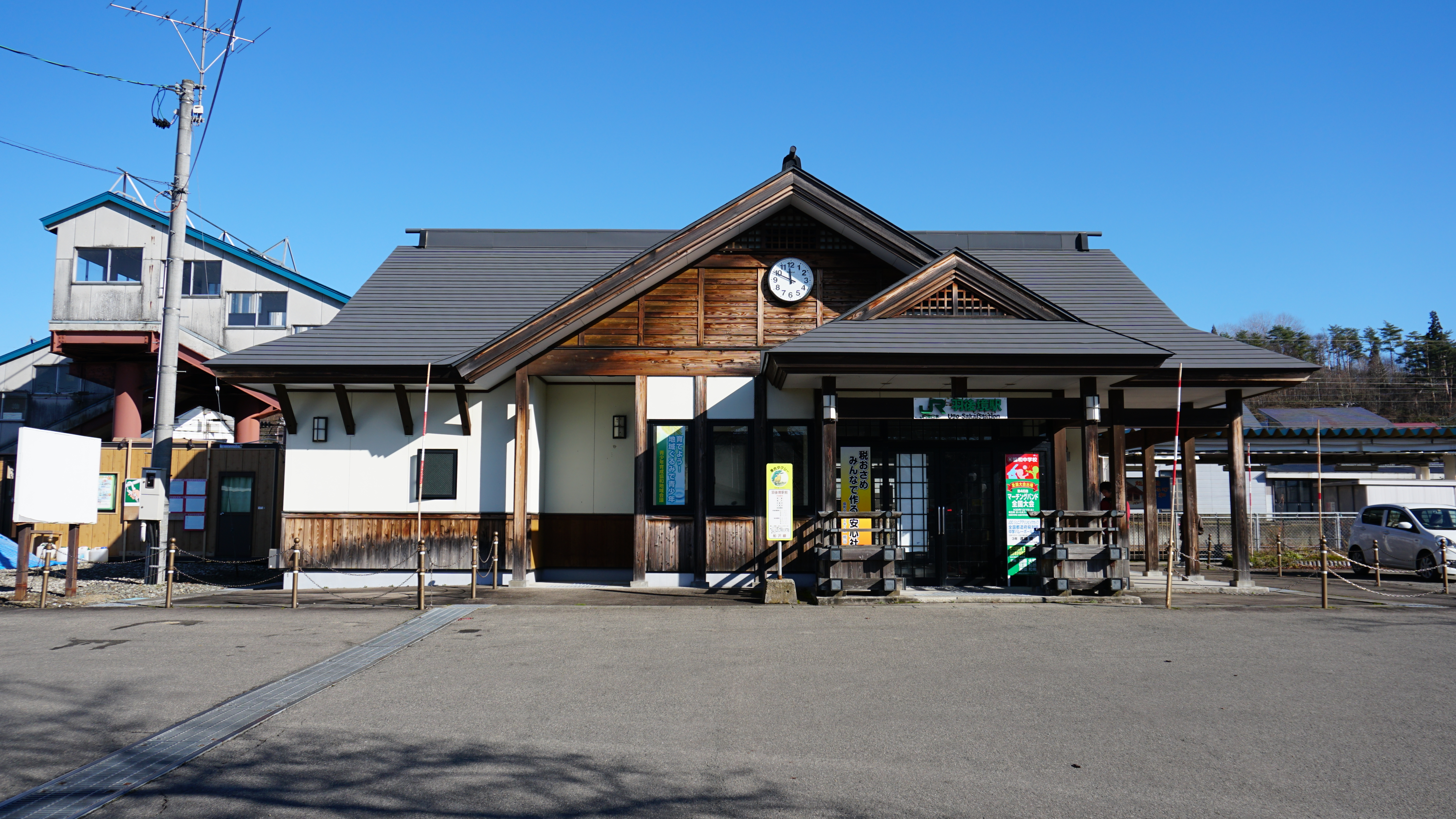
- Ugo-Sakai Station in December 2018

General information
- Location: Noda-128-1 Kyōwasakai, Daisen-shi, Akita-ken 019-2411; Japan
- Coordinates: 39°37′7.2″N 140°19′14.6″E
- Operator: JR East
- Line: ■ Ōu Main Line
- Distance: 271.9 kilometers from Fukushima
- Platforms: 1 island platform

Other information
- Status: Staffed
- Website: Official website

History
- Opened: August 21, 1904
- Former names: Sakai (until 1919)

Passengers
- FY2018: 197 daily

Services
Preceding station	JR East	Following station
Mineyoshikawa towards Shinjō	Ōu Main Line Local	Ōbarino towards Aomori
Location
- Location within Akita Prefecture Location within Japan

Ugo-Sakai Station (羽後境駅, Ugo-Sakai-eki) is a railway station on the Ōu Main Line in Daisen, Akita, Japan, operated by JR East.

== Lines ==
Ugo-Sakai Station is served by the Ōu Main Line, and is located 271.9 km from the terminus of the line at Fukushima Station.

== Station layout ==
The station consists of a single island platform connected to the station building by a footbridge. The tracks of the Akita Shinkansen run parallel to the outside of the track on Platform 2. The station is attended.

=== Platforms ===
1	■ Ōu Main Line	for Akita
2	■ Ōu Main Line	for Yokote and Ōmagari

== History ==
Ugo-Sakai Station opened on August 21, 1904, as Sakai Station (境駅, Sakai-eki). It was renamed Ugo-Sakai Station on July 1, 1919. The station was absorbed into the JR East network upon the privatization of JNR on April 1, 1987. A new station building was completed in February 2004.。

== Passenger statistics ==
In fiscal 2018, the station was used by an average of 197 passengers daily (boarding passengers only).

== Surrounding area ==
- Former Kyōwa town hall
- Kyōwa post office
