= Mineyoshikawa Station =

Railway station in Daisen, Akita Prefecture, Japan

Mineyoshikawa Station 峰吉川駅
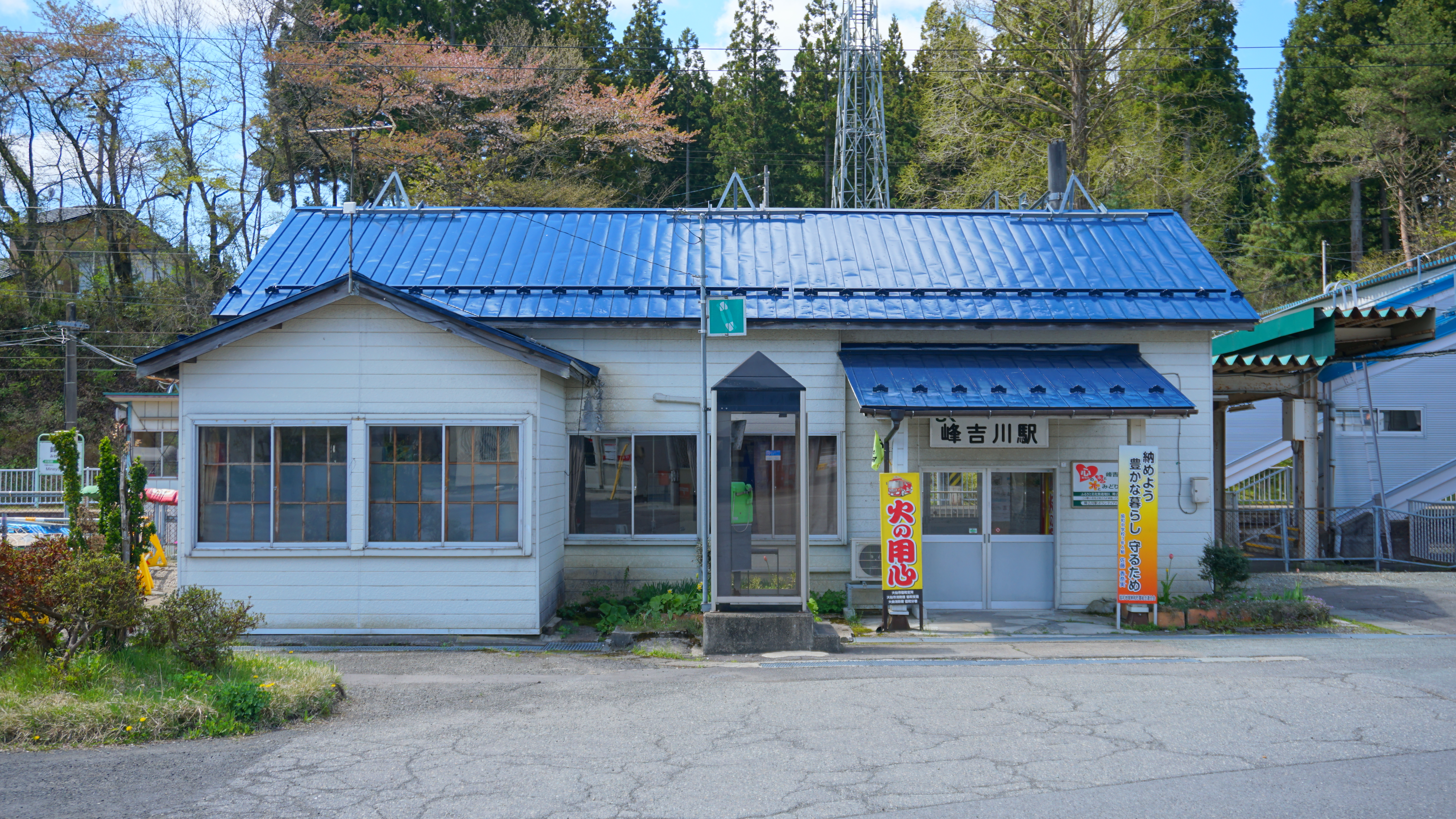
- Mineyoshikawa Station May 2019

General information
- Location: Hansen-64-1 Kyōwamineyoshikawa, Daisen-shi, Akita-ken 019-2431; Japan
- Coordinates: 39°34′0.2″N 140°19′23.8″E
- Operator: JR East
- Line: ■ Ōu Main Line
- Distance: 265.4 kilometers from Fukushima
- Platforms: 2 side platforms

Other information
- Status: Staffed
- Website: www.jreast.co.jp/estation/station/info.aspx?StationCd=1506

History
- Opened: June 21, 1930

Passengers
- FY2018: 67 daily

Services
Preceding station	JR East	Following station
Kariwano towards Shinjō	Ōu Main Line Local	Ugo-Sakai towards Aomori
Location
- Location within Akita Prefecture Location within Japan

Mineyoshikawa Station (峰吉川駅, Mineyoshikawa-eki) is a JR East railway station in the city of Daisen, Akita Prefecture, Japan.

== Lines ==
Mineyoshikawa Station is served by the Ōu Main Line, and is located 265.4 km from the terminus of the line at Fukushima Station.

== Station layout ==
Mineyoshikawa Station consists of a two opposed side platforms connected by a footbridge, although the platform next to the station building is now reserved for through traffic for the Akita Shinkansen. The station is staffed.

=== Platforms ===
1	■ Ōu Main Line	for through traffic
2	■ Ōu Main Line	for Akita for Yokote and Ōmagari

== History ==
Mineyoshikawa Station began as Mineyoshikawa Signal (峰吉信号場) on December 20, 1924 on the Japanese Government Railways (JGR), serving the village of Yoshikawa. It was elevated to a full station on June 21, 1930. The JGR became the Japan National Railways (JNR) after World War II. The station was absorbed into the JR East network upon the privatization of the JNR on April 1, 1987. A new station building was completed in February 2004.

== Passenger statistics ==
In fiscal 2018, the station was used by an average of 67 passengers daily (boarding passengers only).

== Surrounding area ==
- National Route 13
