= Detatoko Princess =

Manga and direct-to-video anime

- Cover of the first volume of Detatoko Princess as published by Fujimi Shobo

でたとこプリンセス (Detatoko Purinsesu)
- Genre: Comedy, Fantasy
- Manga
- Written by: Hitoshi Okuda
- Published by: Fujimi Shobo
- Magazine: Dragon Magazine
- Original run: 1994 – 1999
- Volumes: 6
- Original video animation
- Directed by: Akiyuki Shinbo
- Produced by: Mitsuru Ōshima; Hirotoshi Nakamura; Hiroyuki Yonemasu; Michihisa Abe
- Written by: Mayori Sekijima
- Music by: Takeo Miratsu
- Studio: J.C.Staff; T-Up
- Licensed by: NA: Media Blasters
- Released: December 1, 1997 – May 21, 1998
- Runtime: 30 minutes each
- Episodes: 3

Detatoko Princess (Japanese: でたとこプリンセス, Hepburn: Detatoko Purinsesu; lit. "Suddenly Princess") is a Japanese manga written by Hitoshi Okuda and serialised in Dragon Magazine from 1994 to 1999. The individual chapters were published in six bound volumes by Fujimi Shobo.

The manga was adapted into a 3-episode original video animation, created by J.C.Staff and directed by Akiyuki Shinbo. The 3 episodes were released in Japan between December 1, 1997, and May 21, 1998. In the United States the OVA was released by AnimeWorks, a division of Media Blasters, in May 2004.

== Characters ==
Lapis (ラピス, Rapisu)
Voiced by: Yūko Miyamura (Japanese); Laura Chyu (English)
Kohaku (コハク)
Voiced by: Tomokazu Seki (Japanese); Peter Doyle (English)
Nandra (ナンドラ, Nandora)
Voiced by: Mika Kanai (Japanese); Philece Sampler (English)
Jii (爺)
Voiced by: Takeshi Aono (Japanese); Doug Stone (English)
Topaz (トパーズ)
Voiced by: Aya Hisakawa (Japanese); Jessica Gee (English)
Juwai (ジュワイ)
Voiced by: Shiho Niiyama (Japanese); Bryce Papenbrook (English)

== Media ==
=== Manga ===
Fujimi Shobo published the manga's six tankōbon between January 1994 and December 1998.

==== Volume listing ====
No.	Release date	ISBN
1	January 1994	978-4-82-918337-3
2	July 1995	978-4-04-926074-8
3	August 1996	978-4-04-926094-6
4	October 1997	978-4-04-926114-1
5	April 1998	978-4-04-926121-9
6	December 1998	978-4-04-926130-1

=== OVAs ===
The OVAs uses two pieces of theme music. The opening theme is "Chocolat au lait" (ショコラ・オ・レ, Shokora.O.Re), while "Tenshi No O Heso" (天使のおへそ) is the series' ending theme.

On May 25, 2004, AnimeWorks released a DVD containing the three OVAs.

No.	Title	Directed by (Note: Information is taken from the ending credits of each episode.)	Written by	Storyboarded by	Original release date
1	"Force Your Adorn Daughter to go on a Journey"; Transliteration: "Kawaii Ko ni wa Muriyari Tabi Sasero" (Japanese: かわいい娘にはムリヤリ旅させろ)	-	Masashi Kubota	-	December 1, 1997
2	"Face-Off at the Forest of Puddings"; Transliteration: "Purin no Mori no Kettou" (Japanese: プリンの森の決闘)	Katsuichi Nakayama	Mayori Sekijima	Katsuichi Nakayama	March 21, 1998
3	"Wraith of the Health Brother Trio"; Transliteration: "Kyoufu no Kenkou San Kyoudai" (Japanese: 恐怖の健康三兄弟)	-	Masashi Kubota	Yoshiki Yamakawa	May 21, 1998

== Reception ==
Anime News Network's Bamboo Dong criticised the OVAs for taking "every fantasy stereotype and embraces it, making no pretence of the fact that they're trying to milk every cliché".
