= Juei Ushiromatsu =

Japanese baseball player (born 1979)

Juei Ushiromatsu (後松 重栄, Ushiromatsu Jūei; born September 21, 1979 in Ōmagari, Akita, Japan) is a Japanese former professional baseball relief pitcher who played in the New York Mets minor league system in 1998. He is known for being the first Japanese player to sign directly with a major league organization without playing any professional baseball in Japan.

== Background ==
After attending Omagari Kogyo High School in Akita Prefecture, Ushiromatsu signed with New York in November 1997 at the urging of scout Isao Ojimi when he was 18 years old. The 6' 1", 165 pound left-handed pitcher, who was bypassed in Japan's amateur draft, signed for a bonus of about $100,000. He pitched for the Gulf Coast Mets that season - his only professional campaign in the United States - and went 0–2 with a 4.85 ERA in 16 relief appearances. His professional career ended prematurely after he injured his back in a car accident.
