= Nishisenboku, Akita =

Dissolved municipality in Akita prefecture, Japan

Nishisenboku (西仙北町, Nishisenboku-machi) was a town located in Senboku District, Akita Prefecture, Japan.

In 2003, the town had an estimated population of 10,333 and a density of 61.36 persons per km^{2}. The total area was 168.40 km^{2}.

On March 22, 2005, Nishisenboku, along with the city of Ōmagari; the towns of Kamioka, Kyōwa, Nakasen, Ōta and Semboku; and the village of Nangai (all from Senboku District), merged to create the city of Daisen.
