= Kariwano Station =

Railway station in Daisen, Akita Prefecture, Japan

Kariwano Station 刈和野駅
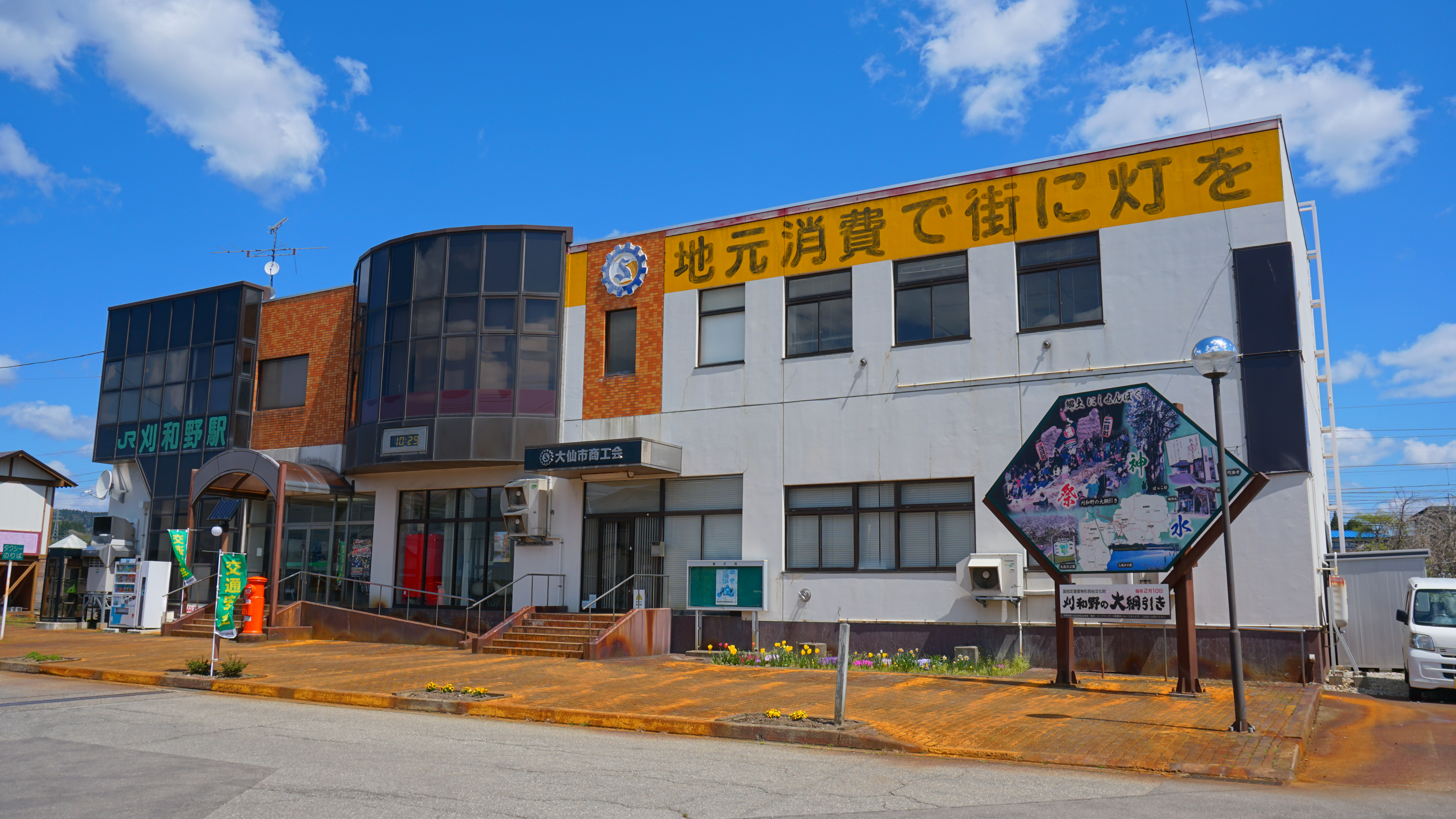
- Kariwano Station in May 2019

General information
- Location: Atagoshita-119 Kariwano, Daisen-shi, Akita-ken 019-2112; Japan
- Coordinates: 39°32′51.5″N 140°22′20.6″E
- Operator: JR East
- Line: ■ Ōu Main Line
- Distance: 260.6 kilometers from Fukushima
- Platforms: 1 island platform

Other information
- Status: Staffed
- Website: Official website

History
- Opened: August 21, 1904

Passengers
- FY2018: 310 daily

Services
Preceding station	JR East	Following station
Ōmagari One-way operation	Ōu Main Line Rapid	Wada towards Aomori
Jingūji towards Shinjō	Ōu Main Line Local	Mineyoshikawa towards Aomori
Location
- Location within Akita Prefecture Location within Japan

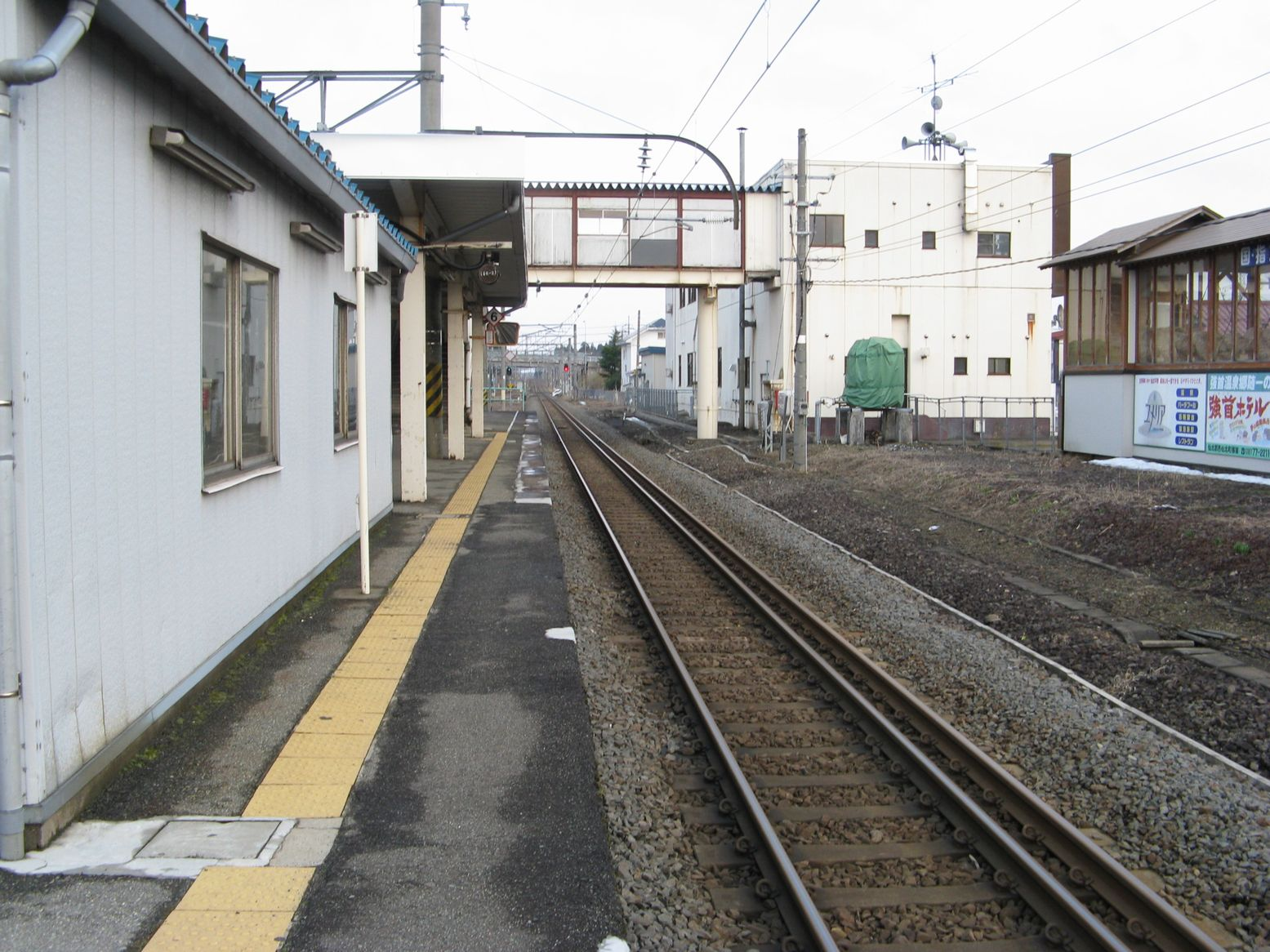
Platform

Kariwano Station (刈和野駅, Kariwano-eki) is a JR East railway station located in the city of Daisen, Akita Prefecture, Japan.

== Lines ==
Kariwano Station is served by the Ōu Main Line, and is located 260.6 km from the terminus of the line at Fukushima Station.

== Station layout ==
Kariwano Station consists of a single island platform serving two tracks, connected to the station building by a footbridge. Track 1 is dual gauge for use by through traffic of the Akita Shinkansen. The station is attended.

=== Platforms ===
1	■ Ōu Main Line	for Akita
2	■ Ōu Main Line	for Yokote and Ōmagari

== History ==
Kariwano Station was opened on August 21, 1904 on the Japanese Government Railways (JGR), serving the town of Kariwano. The JGR became the Japan National Railways (JNR) after World War II. The station was absorbed into the JR East network upon the privatization of the JNR on April 1, 1987. A new station building was completed in February 1990, which incorporates the offices of the local chamber of commerce and tourism office.

== Passenger statistics ==
In fiscal 2018, the station was used by an average of 310 passengers daily (boarding passengers only).

== Surrounding area ==
- Kariwano Post Office
- National Route 13
