= Ōbarino Station =

Railway station in Akita, Akita Prefecture, Japan

Ōbarino Station 大張野駅
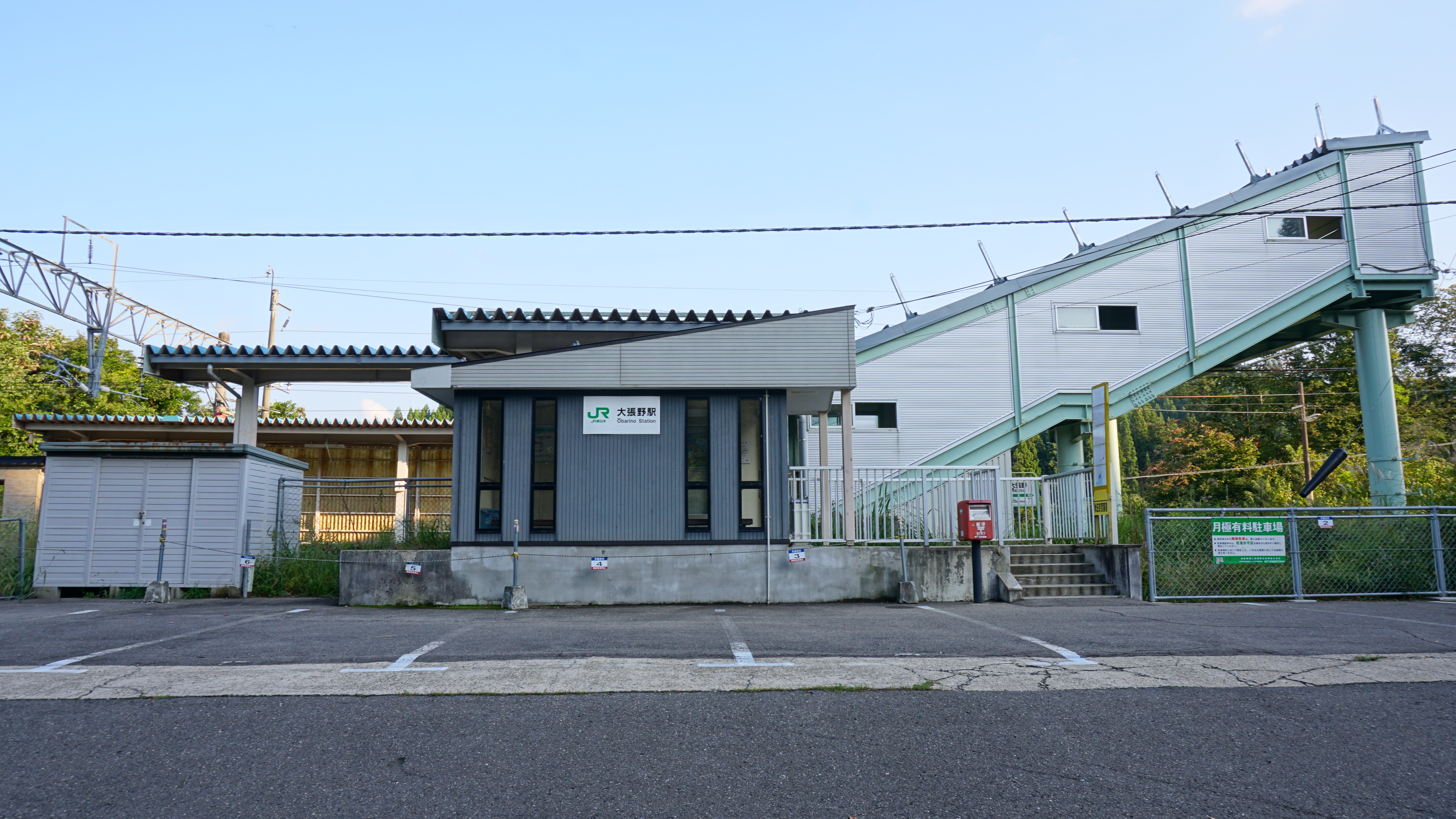
- Obarino Station (September 2019)

General information
- Location: Shikoku Kawabejinnai, Akita-shi,Akita-ken, 019-2631; Japan
- Coordinates: 39°39′48.6″N 140°16′25.6″E
- Operator: JR East
- Line: ■ Ōu Main Line
- Distance: 280.0 kilometers from Fukushima
- Platforms: 1 side platform

Other information
- Status: Unstaffed
- Website: Official website

History
- Opened: February 1, 1950

Services
Preceding station	JR East	Following station
Ugo-Sakai towards Shinjō	Ōu Main Line Local	Wada towards Aomori
Location
- Location within Akita Prefecture Location within Japan

Ōbarino Station (大張野駅, Ōbarino-eki) is a railway station in the city of Akita, Akita Prefecture, Japan, operated by East Japan Railway Company (JR East).

== Lines ==
Ōbarino Station is served by the Ōu Main Line, and is located 280.0 km from the starting point of the line at Fukushima Station.

== Station layout ==
The station has one side platform serving one bi-directional track, connected to the station building by a footbridge. The tracks of the Akita Shinkansen run in-between the station building and the platform.

== History ==
Ōbarino Station opened as the Funaoka Signal Stop on November 10, 1921, It was renamed the Ōbarino Signal Stop on February 25, 1929. It was closed from February 1933 to October 10, 1940. On February 1, 1950, it became a passenger railway station. It has been unattended since December 1, 1979. The station was absorbed into the JR East network upon the privatization of JNR on April 1, 1987. A new station building was completed in April 2006.

== Surrounding area ==
- Jinnai River
- Kishibojin Shrine

== See also ==
- List of railway stations in Japan
