= Rokugō rebellion =

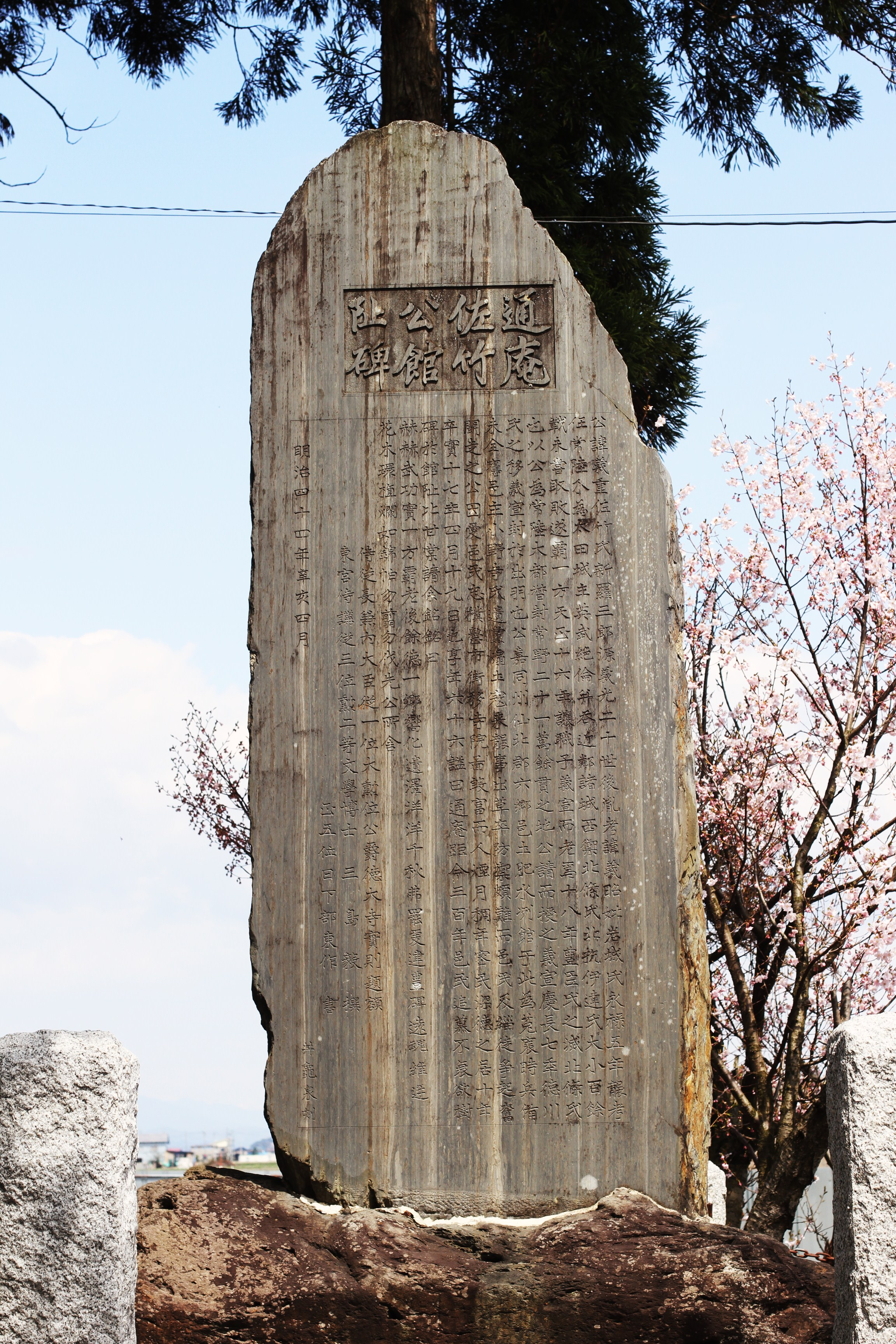
- Rokugo Castle Monument
Date	November 1603
Location	Rokugō, Dewa Province, Japan 39.421333°N 140.544528°E
Result	Satake clan victory, rebellion defeated
Territorial changes	Satake clan takes full control of Kubota Domain

Belligerents
Onodera clan loyalists	Satake clan and allied locals

Commanders and leaders
Unknown	Satake Yoshinobu

Strength
c. 1,000 rōnin	Unknown
- Location within Japan

The Rokugō rebellion was a last stand of over 1,000 rōnin in 1603, who had been samurai in service of Onodera Yoshimichi until his defeat and exile by the Tokugawa shogunate's followers in 1601. Refusing to submit to the new ruler of Yoshimichi's former lands, Satake Yoshinobu, the rōnin launched an unsuccessful rebellion at Rokugō in "a final suicidal gesture" for their old master Yoshimichi, to whom they remained loyal.

== Background ==
The Onodera clan was a relatively minor noble family in the Dewa Province during the late Sengoku period that had consolidated its domain in modern-day southern Akita in course of almost three decades of warfare. During the course of these years, it had repeatedly faced and fiercely resisted several invasions by outsiders, most notably the Mogami clan. Enjoying a considerable degree of popular support among the local population and loyalty among their retainers, the Onodera successfully fended off all attacks on their lands.

These localised conflicts gained a new notion, however, when the war between the forces loyal to Tokugawa Ieyasu and Toyotomi Hideyori broke out in 1600, resulting in lords all over Japan having to decide where their loyalties laid. Onodera Yoshimichi, head of the Onodera family at the time, pledged himself to the Toyotomi cause (the only daimyō in the Akita area to do so) and remained steadfast even after the Toyotomi loyalists were decisively defeated at Sekigahara. The Mogami, on the other side, had joined forces with Tokugawa, and used the Onodera clan's new political isolation to defeat them once and for all. Thus the weakened Onodera were finally subjugated, and the surviving clan members, including Onodera Yoshimichi, were exiled. Though one clan member, Onodera Shigemichi, refused to yield even after this point and continued to resist, he too was defeated in early 1601.

== The rebellion ==
After the end of Onodera Shigemichi's resistance, the Onodera han (fief) was extinguished, and with it most of the clan's samurai became unemployed, masterless rōnin, who were deeply resentful over their former lord's treatment by the Tokugawa shogunate. Two years later, Tokugawa Ieyasu redistributed the han of the noble families all over Japan, with the Onodera clan's old lands given to the Satake clan as Kubota Domain.

As a result, Satake Yoshinobu was appointed as new overlord over the region, and arrived in November 1603 to take control of his new domain. As Yokote Castle was still in ruins from a previous battle, Yoshinobu decided to take temporary residence in the minor fortress of Rokugō, only to find it barricaded against him by former Onodera retainers. He was thus forced to storm a castle that was de jure his own. Soon after taking full control of Rokugō, however, Satake Yoshinobu found himself besieged by 1,000 pro-Onodera rōnin, who had decided to rebel in "a final suicidal gesture" against the government and for their former master Onodera Yoshimichi. Rokugō's townspeople and monks rallied to oust the rōnin, and together with the Satake clan's forces quickly defeated the rebels. Nevertheless, historian Stephen Turnbull judged that "no hatamoto in Japanese history were ever to express their loyalty to their distant lord in such a dramatic fashion" as the Onodera samurai had.

== Bibliography ==
- Turnbull, Stephen (2010). Hatamoto. Samurai Horse and Foot Guards 1540–1724. Oxford: Osprey Publishing. ISBN 978-184603-478-7.
- Turnbull, Stephen (2013). "The ghosts of Amakusa: localised opposition to centralised control in Higo Province, 1589–1590". Japan Forum. 25 (2). Taylor & Francis: 191–211. doi:10.1080/09555803.2012.745586. S2CID 144893702.
