= FM Hanabi =

JOZZ2BM-FM

Daisen, Akita, Japan; Japan
- Broadcast area: Daisen, Akita
- Frequency: 87.3 MHz
- Branding: FM Hanabi

Programming
- Languages: Japanese, Akita dialect
- Format: Music/Talk/Sports/News

History
- First air date: August 8, 2015

Technical information
- Power: 20 W
- Transmitter coordinates: 39°28′02″N 140°26′02″E

Links
- Webcast: https://fmplapla.com/fm-hanabi/
- Website: Official website

FM Hanabi (FMはなび) is a Japanese FM station that is run by TMO Omagari in Daisen, Akita, Japan.

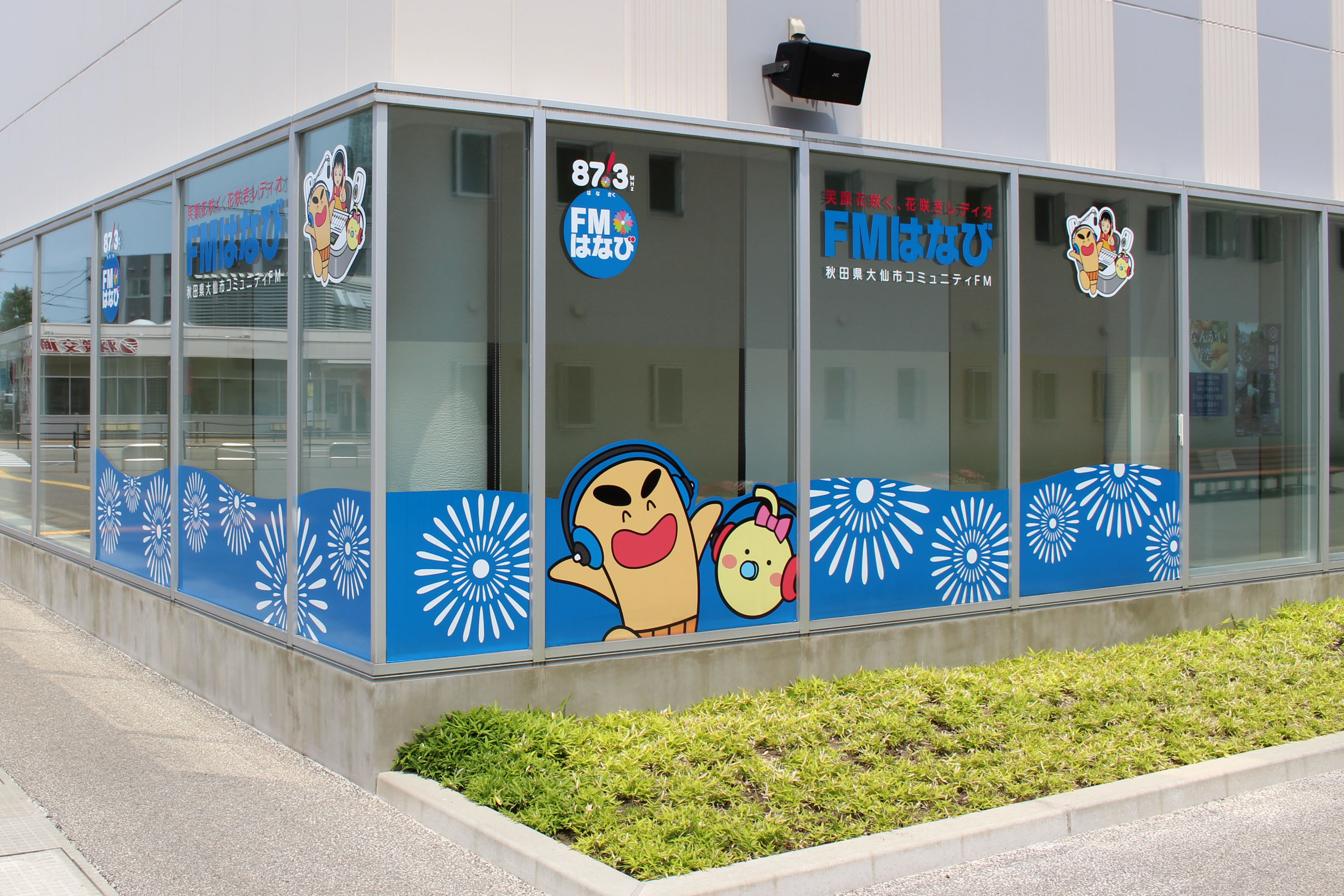
Headquarters and studio

== Stations ==
- Omagari 87.3 MHz 20 W 39°28′02″N 140°26′02″E
- Nangai 87.3 MHz 20 W 39°26′58.1″N 140°21′52.8″E
- Kyowa 87.3 MHz 20 W 39°36′37.6″N 140°18′46.3″E
- Kyowa Funaoka 87.3 MHz 5 W 39°41′22.6″N 140°24′34.1″E
- Ioka 87.3 MHz 3 W 39°25′46.6″N 140°25′49.8″E

== Programs ==
- Uchiagero Go!Go!Akita Northern Happinets!!
- Aoi Inazuma Blaublitz Akita

=== Programs in Akita dialect ===
- Jisama no agura, Basama no henaga
