= Hotta-no-saku =

Archeological site in Japan

Hotta-no-saku ruins
- 払田柵跡
- Daisen, and Misato, Akita Prefecture, Japan
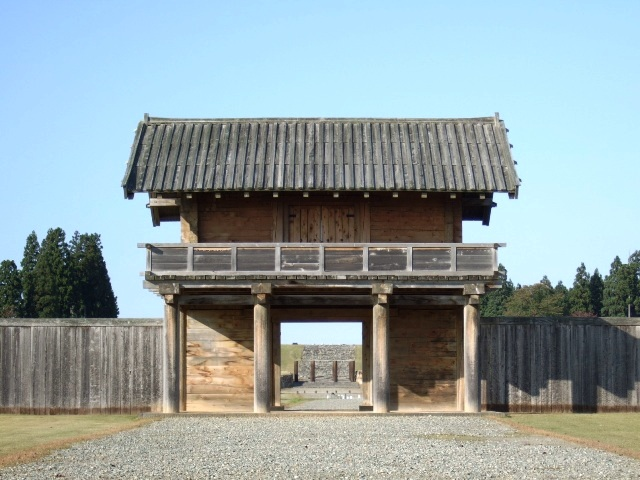
- Reconstructed South Gate of Hotta-no-saku

Site information
- Type: josaku-style Japanese castle
- Open to the public: yes
- Condition: ruins

Location
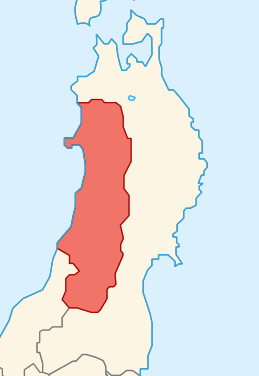
- Coordinates: 39°28′07″N 140°32′50″E

Site history
- In use: Heian period
- Demolished: c.801 AD

The Hotta-no-saku ruins (払田柵跡, Hotta-no-saku iseki) is an archaeological site containing the ruins of a large-scale Heian period josaku-style fortified settlement located in what is now part of the municipalities of Daisen and Misato in the Tōhoku region of Japan. The site was designated a National Historic Site of Japan in 1931. The site is maintained as an archaeological park with some reconstructed buildings.

== Overview ==
In 1902, farmers discovered the remnants of a large wooden palisade in rice paddies near the border of Misato in Akita Prefecture. Over 200 almost intact fence posts with a diameter of 30 centimeters (12 in), and a height above ground of 3.6 meters (12 ft) were discovered, most of which was subsequently burned for fuel or processed into geta wooden clogs. However, some fragments survived and were later dated by dendrochronology to the year 801 AD. An archaeological survey discovered that this palisade had dimensions of approximately 1,370 meters (4,490 ft) from east-west by 780 meters (2,560 ft) north-south, as was thus larger than Taga Castle, and was actually the largest josaku-style castle in northern Japan. Inscriptions of wooden artifacts found at the site mention Isawa Castle and Shiwa Castle which were created in the early ninth century AD; however, there is no mention of this huge fortification in any historical or literary records.

In the center of the enclosure was the ruins of an inner fortification, containing the pillar foundations for what appears to be an official administrative complex. The site appears to have been abandoned by the middle of the 10th century.

The site has been preserved as an archaeological park with some reconstructed buildings, and is located approximately 20 minutes by bus from the JR East Ōu Main Line Ōmagari Station.

== Gallery ==
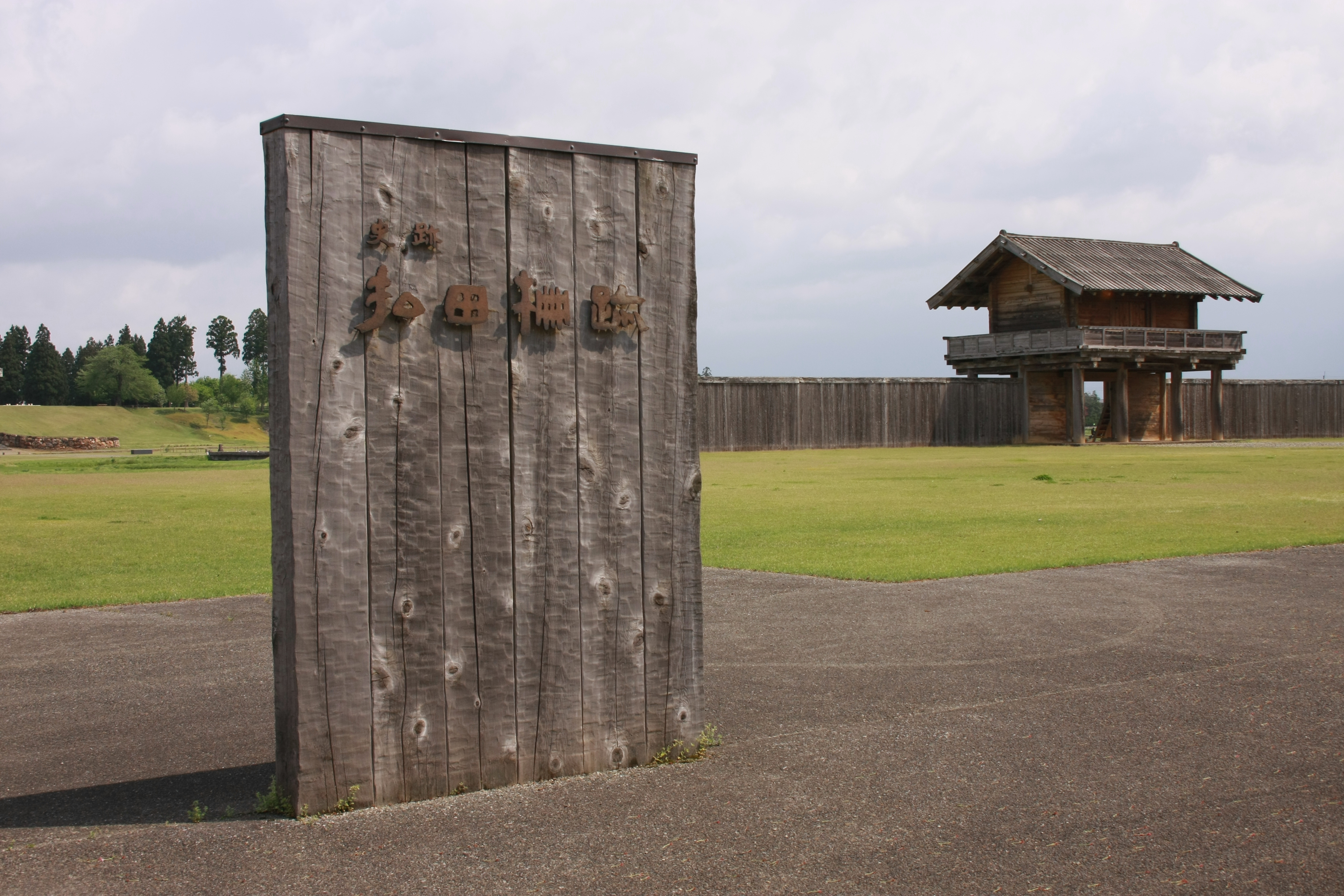
Entry to the site

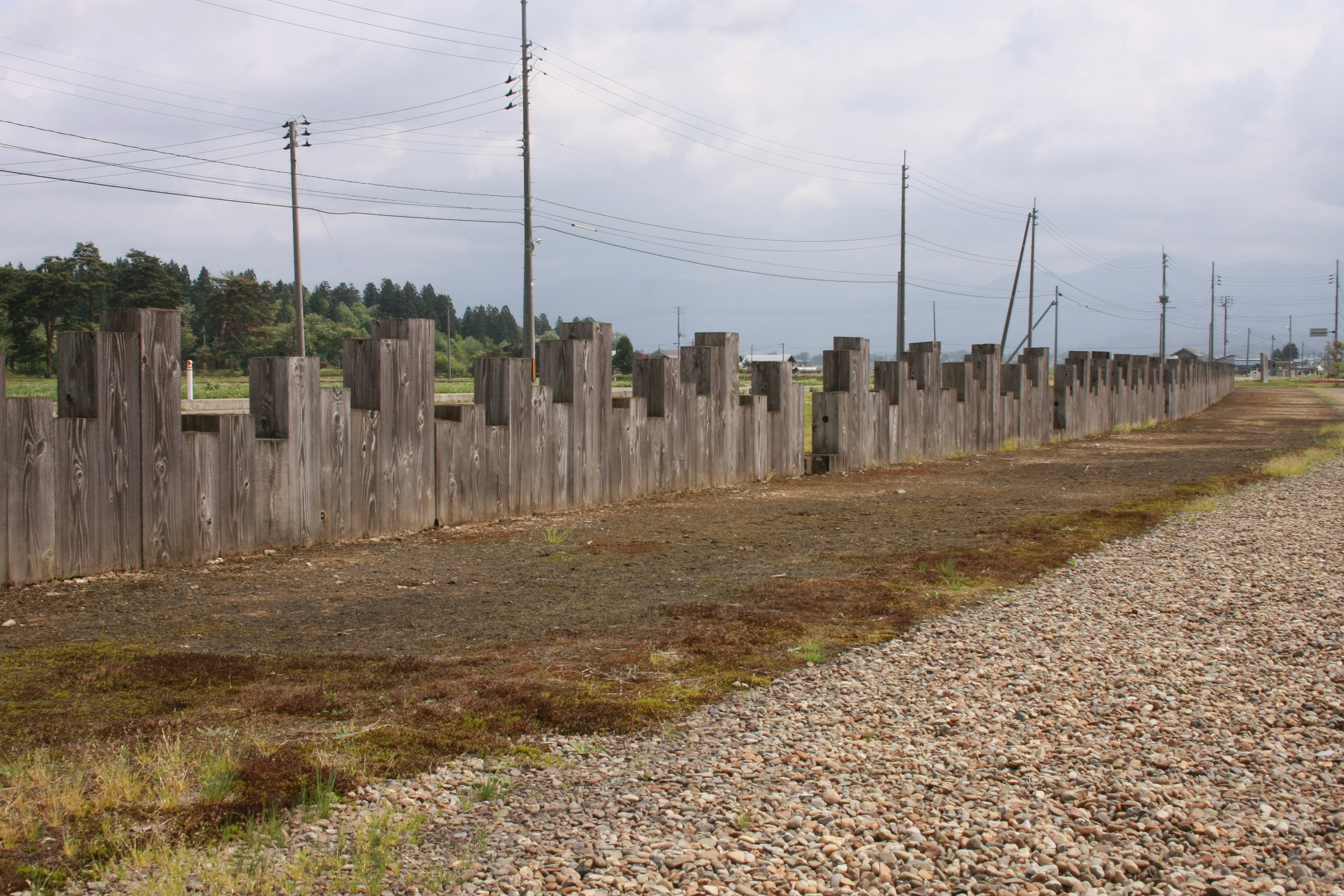
Remnants of outer palisade

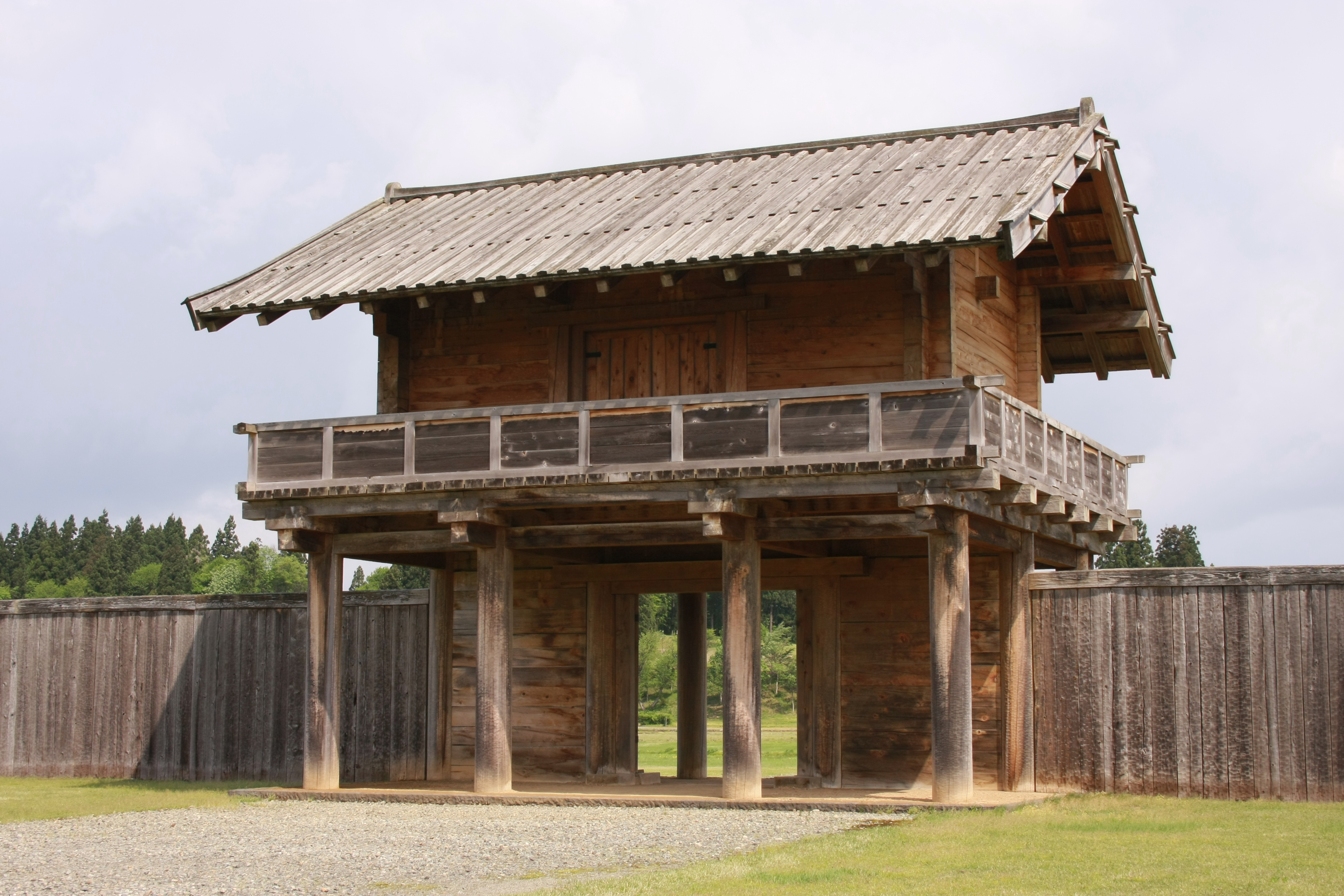
Reconstructed South Gate

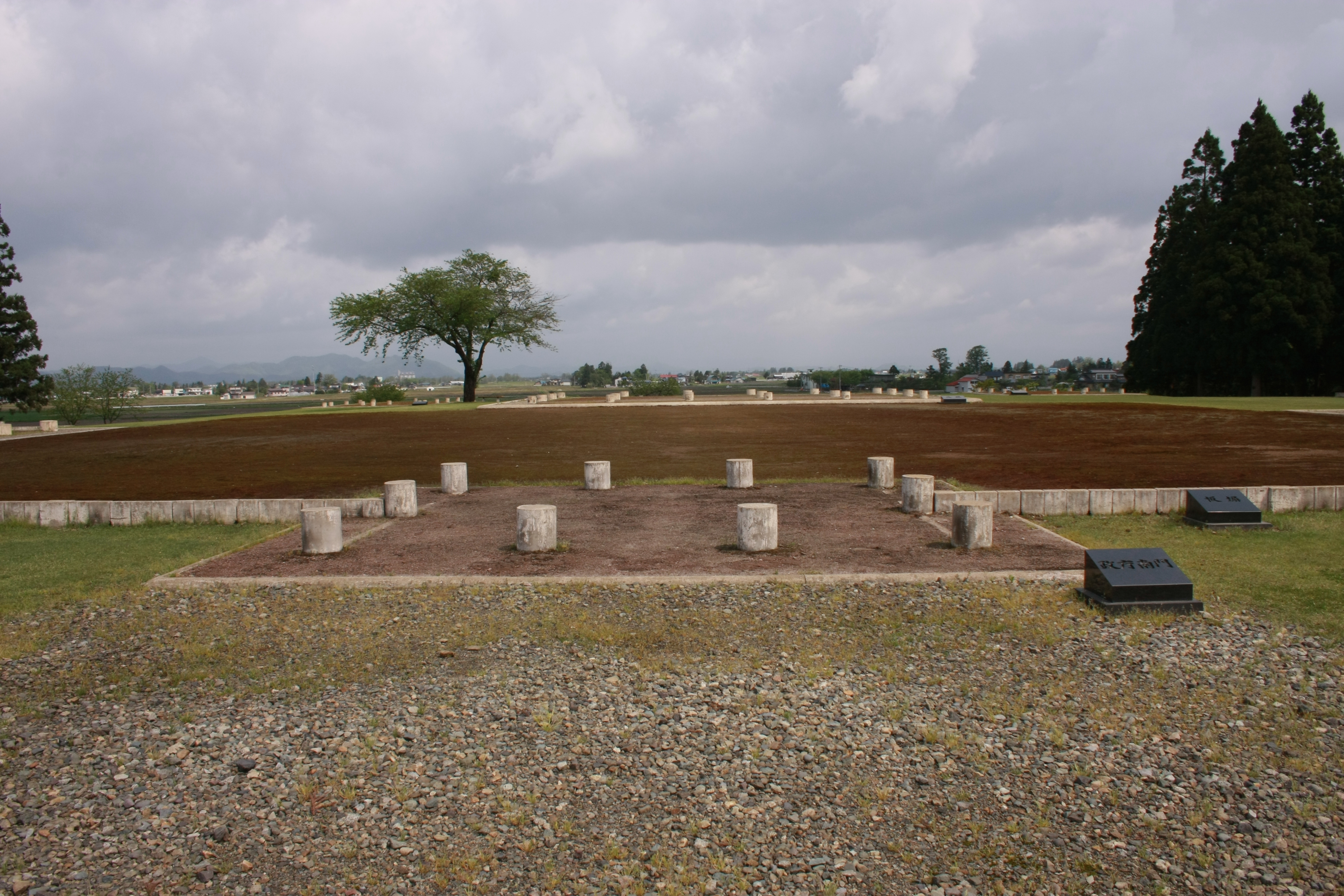
Foundations of official complex

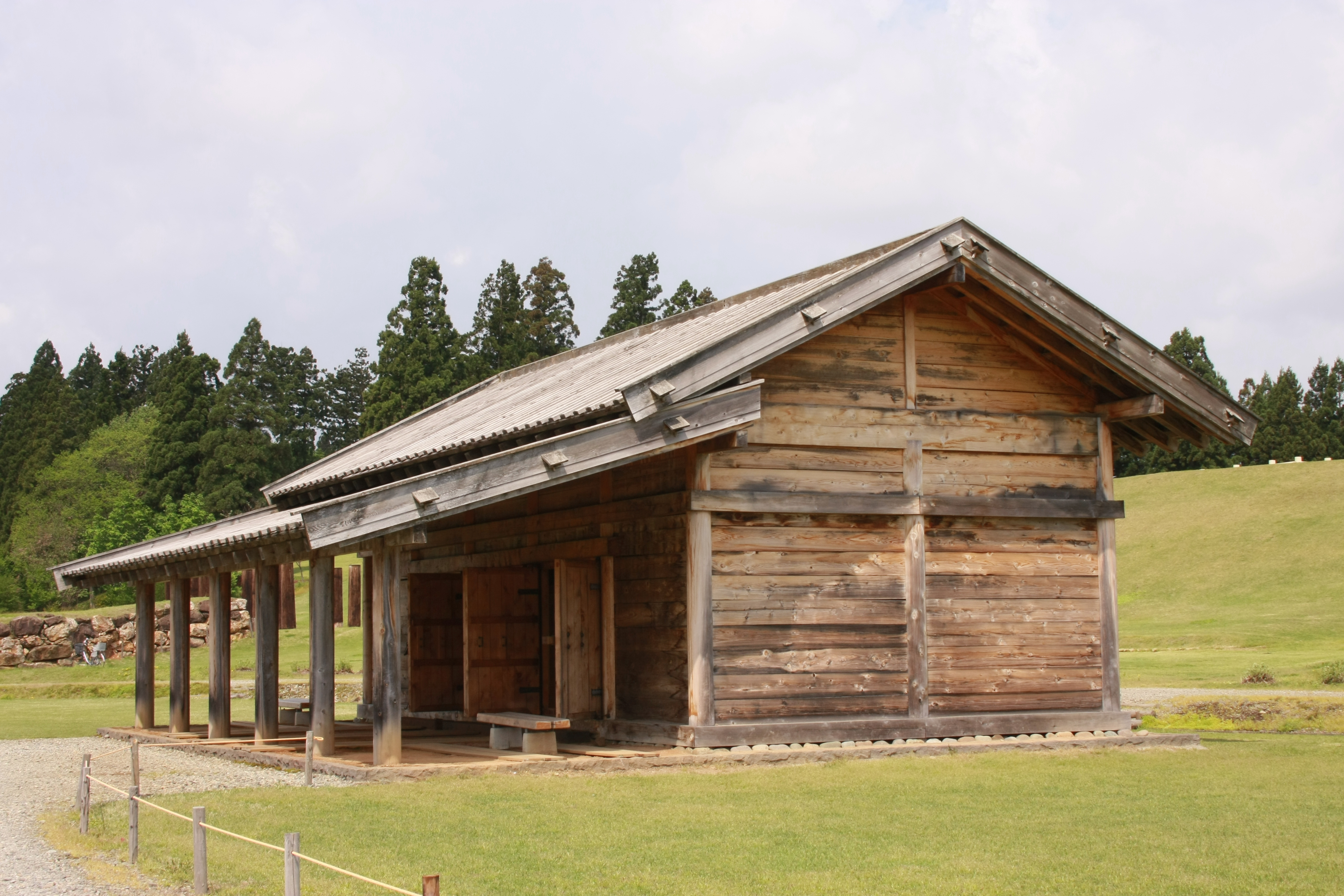
Reconstructed building

== See also ==
- List of Historic Sites of Japan (Akita)
