= Hitoshi Okuda =

Japanese manga artist

- Born: Okuda Hitoshi (奥田 ひとし); August 15, 1963 (age 63); Daisen, Akita Prefecture, Japan
- Occupation: Manga artist
- Known for: Tenchi Muyo!

Hitoshi Okuda (奥田 ひとし, Okuda Hitoshi; born 1963 in Daisen, Akita) is a Japanese manga artist, most famous for his characterizations and stories set in the world of Tenchi Muyo!.

Okuda got his start as a doujinshi artist before debuting professionally, studying under Nobuteru Yūki and Yutaka Izubuchi.

His collection of Tenchi-related works spans eleven years, beginning with "No Need for Tenchi!" in 1994 before finishing its run as "The All-New Tenchi Muyō!" ("Shin Tenchi Muyō!") in late 2005. "Tenchi, Heaven Forbid! G...", a collection of seventy-four yonkoma comics drawn during the course of six years for Pioneer LDC's monthly fan club letter, was later released by VIZ Media as "Tenchi Muyō: Sasami Stories", bundled along with previously published material featuring the Sasami character.

== Works ==
- Radical Guardian (ラジカルガーディアン) (1990)
- No Need for Tenchi! (1994–2000)
  - The All-New Tenchi Muyō! (2000–2005)
  - Tenchi Muyō! Sasami Stories (2002)
  - Tenchi, Heaven Forbid! G... (1994–2000)
- Detatoko Princess (1994–1999)
- Yin-Yang Detective Takanashi Ranto Magical Records (陰陽探偵少女遊RANTO☆魔承録, Onmyō Tantei Takanashi Ranto Mashōroku) (1999-2001)
- Nanana's Buried Treasure (2012-2013)
