= Senhata, Akita =

Dissolved municipality in Akita prefecture, Japan

Location of Senhata in Japan

Senhata (千畑町, Senhata-machi) was a town located in Senboku District, Akita Prefecture, Japan.

As of 2003, the town had an estimated population of 8,258 and a density of 94.29 persons per km^{2}. The total area was 87.58 km^{2}.

On November 1, 2004, Senhata, along with the town of Rokugō and the village of Sennan (all from Senboku District), merged to create the town of Misato.
