= Ōmagari, Akita =

Ōmagari 大曲市
- City
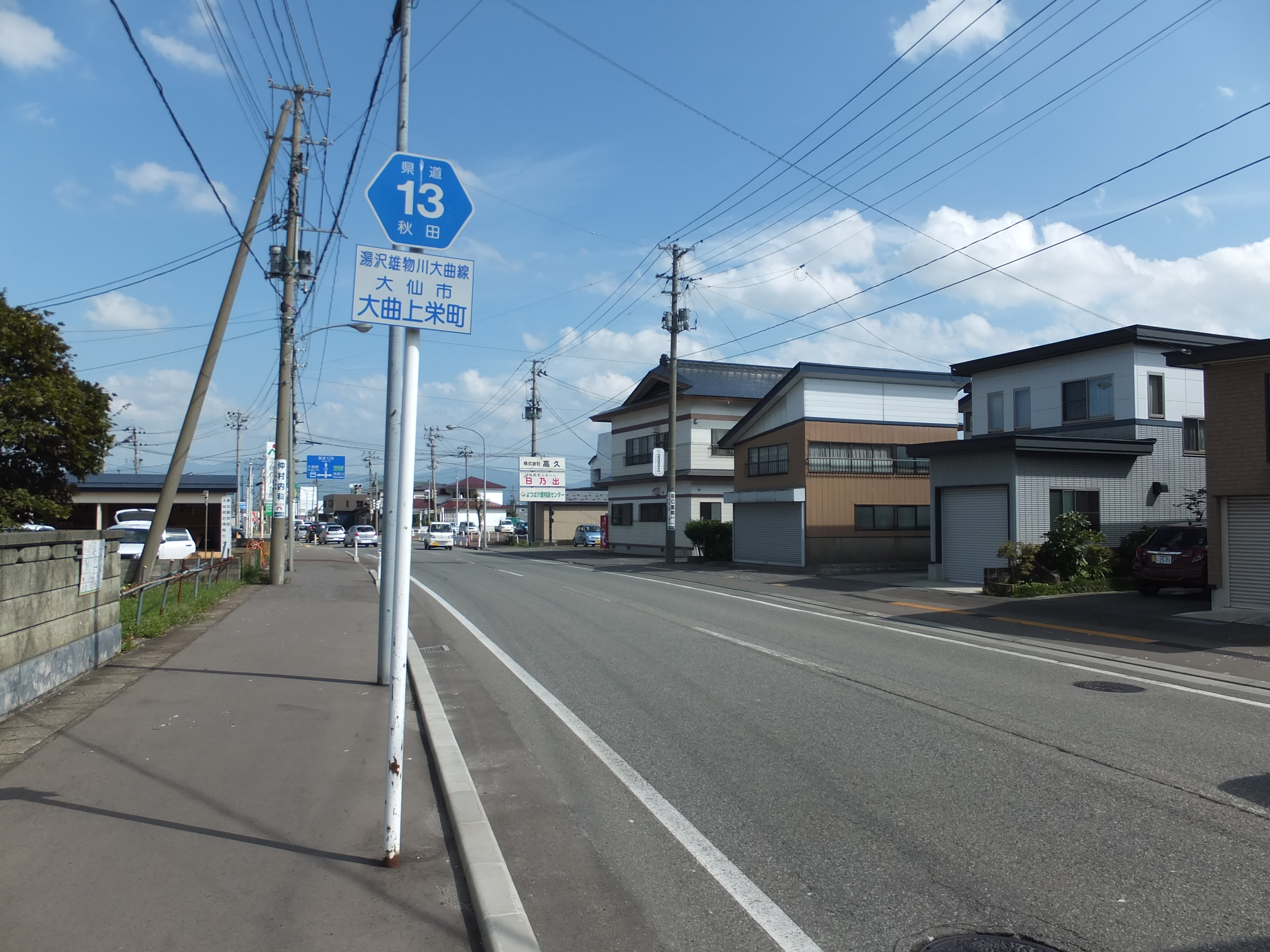
- Road in Ōmagari

- Flag Emblem

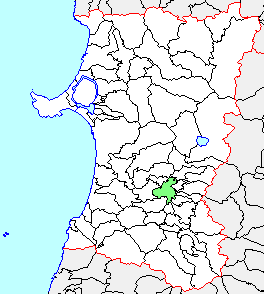
- Location of Ōmagari in Akita Prefecture

- Location within Japan
- Country: Japan
- Region: Tōhoku
- Prefecture: Akita Prefecture
- District: Senboku District

Area
  - Total: 104.69 km^{2} (40.42 sq mi)

Population (2003)
  - Total: 39,048
  - Density: 372.99/km^{2} (966.0/sq mi)
- Time zone: UTC+9 (Japan Standard Time)
- Merged into: Daisen

Ōmagari (大曲市, Ōmagari-shi) was a city located in Akita Prefecture, Japan. The city was founded on May 3, 1954.

On March 22, 2005, Ōmagari, along with the towns of Kamioka, Kyōwa, Nakasen, Nishisenboku, Ōta and Semboku; and the village of Nangai (all from Semboku District), merged to create the city of Daisen.

== Notable people ==
Juei Ushiromatsu, former New York Mets baseball pitcher

== See also ==
- Kakumagawa, Akita
