= Nangai, Akita =

Dissolved municipality in Akita prefecture, Japan

Nangai (南外村, Nangai-mura) was a village located in Senboku District, Akita Prefecture, Japan.

In 2003, the village had an estimated population of 4,529 and a density of 45.82 persons per km^{2}. The total area was 98.85 km^{2}.

On March 22, 2005, Nangai, along with the city of Ōmagari; and the towns of Kamioka, Kyōwa, Nakasen, Nishisenboku, Ōta and Semboku (all from Senboku District), merged to create the city of Daisen.

Chapter seal

Flag
