= Sennan, Akita =

Former municipality in Senboku district, Akita prefecture, Japan

Sennan (仙南村, Sennan-mura) was a village located in Senboku District, Akita Prefecture, Japan.

== Population ==
As of 2003, the village had an estimated population of 8,050 and a density of 195.58 persons per km^{2}. The total area was 41.16 km^{2}.

== History ==
On November 1, 2004, Sennan, along with the towns of Rokugō and Senhata (all from Senboku District), merged to create the town of Misato.
