= Rokugō, Akita =

Rokugō 六郷町
- Former Town
- Flag Emblem

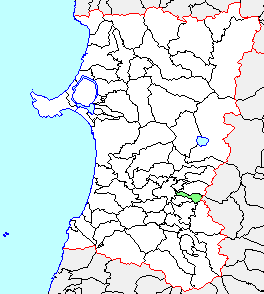
- Country: Japan
- Region: Tōhoku
- Prefecture: Akita Prefecture
- District: Senboku District

Area
  - Total: 39.06 km^{2} (15.08 sq mi)

Population (2003)
  - Total: 7,061
  - Density: 180.77/km^{2} (468.2/sq mi)
- Merged into: Misato

Rokugō (六郷町, Rokugō-machi) was a dissolved town located in Senboku District, Akita Prefecture, Japan.

== History ==
=== Establishment ===
In 1603, the town of Rokugō was established in Dewa Province. It was one of the site of a rebellion by rōnin loyal to Onodera Yoshimichi.

=== Dissolvement ===
On November 1, 2004, Rokugō, along with the town of Senhata and the village of Sennan (all from Senboku District), merged to create the town of Misato.

== Geography ==
=== Land Areas ===
Before Rokugō merged into Misato, Rokugō has a total area of 39.06 km^{2}.

=== Populations ===
As of 2003, the town had an estimated population of 7,061 and a density of 180.77 persons per km^{2}.

== Bibliography ==
- Turnbull, Stephen (2010). Hatamoto. Samurai Horse and Foot Guards 1540–1724. Oxford: Osprey Publishing. ISBN 978-184603-478-7.
