= Daisen, Akita =

Daisen 大仙市
- City
- Daisen City Office

- Flag Seal
- Interactive map of Daisen
- Coordinates: 39°27′11″N 140°28′31.6″E
- Country: Japan
- Region: Tōhoku
- Prefecture: Akita

Government
  - Mayor: Hiroyuki Oimatsu (since April 2017)

Area
  - Total: 866.79 km^{2} (334.67 sq mi)

Population (February 28, 2023)
  - Total: 76,277
  - Density: 87.999/km^{2} (227.92/sq mi)
- Time zone: UTC+9 (Japan Standard Time)
- Phone number: 0187-63-1111
- Address: 1-1 Hanazono-chō, Daisen-shi, Akita-ken 014-8601
- Climate: Cfa/Dfa
- Website: Official website
- Symbols
- Bird: Common kingfisher
- Flower: Cosmos
- Tree: Japanese zelkova

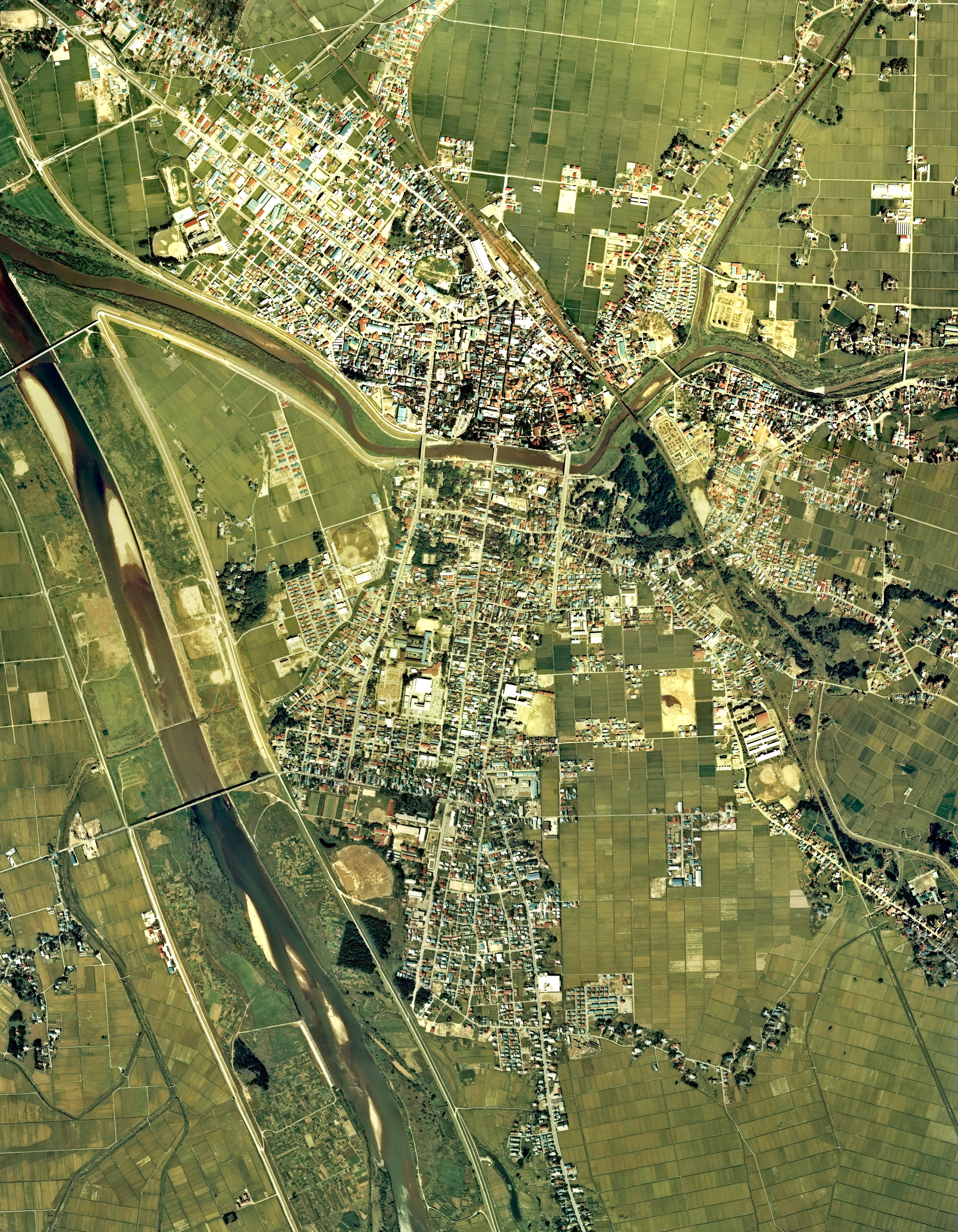
Omagari district Daisen city center area Aerial photograph.1976

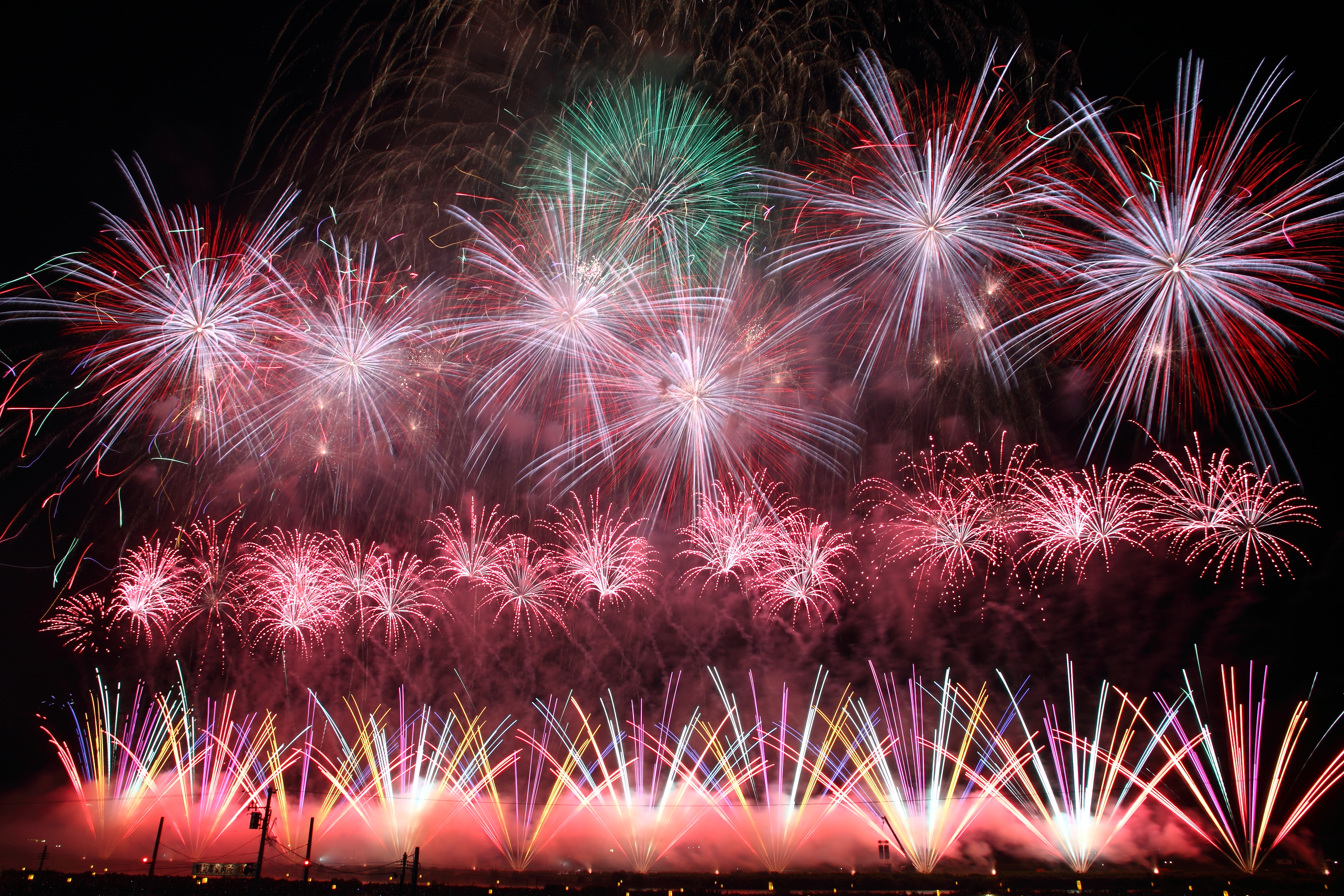
National Fireworks Competition in Daisen

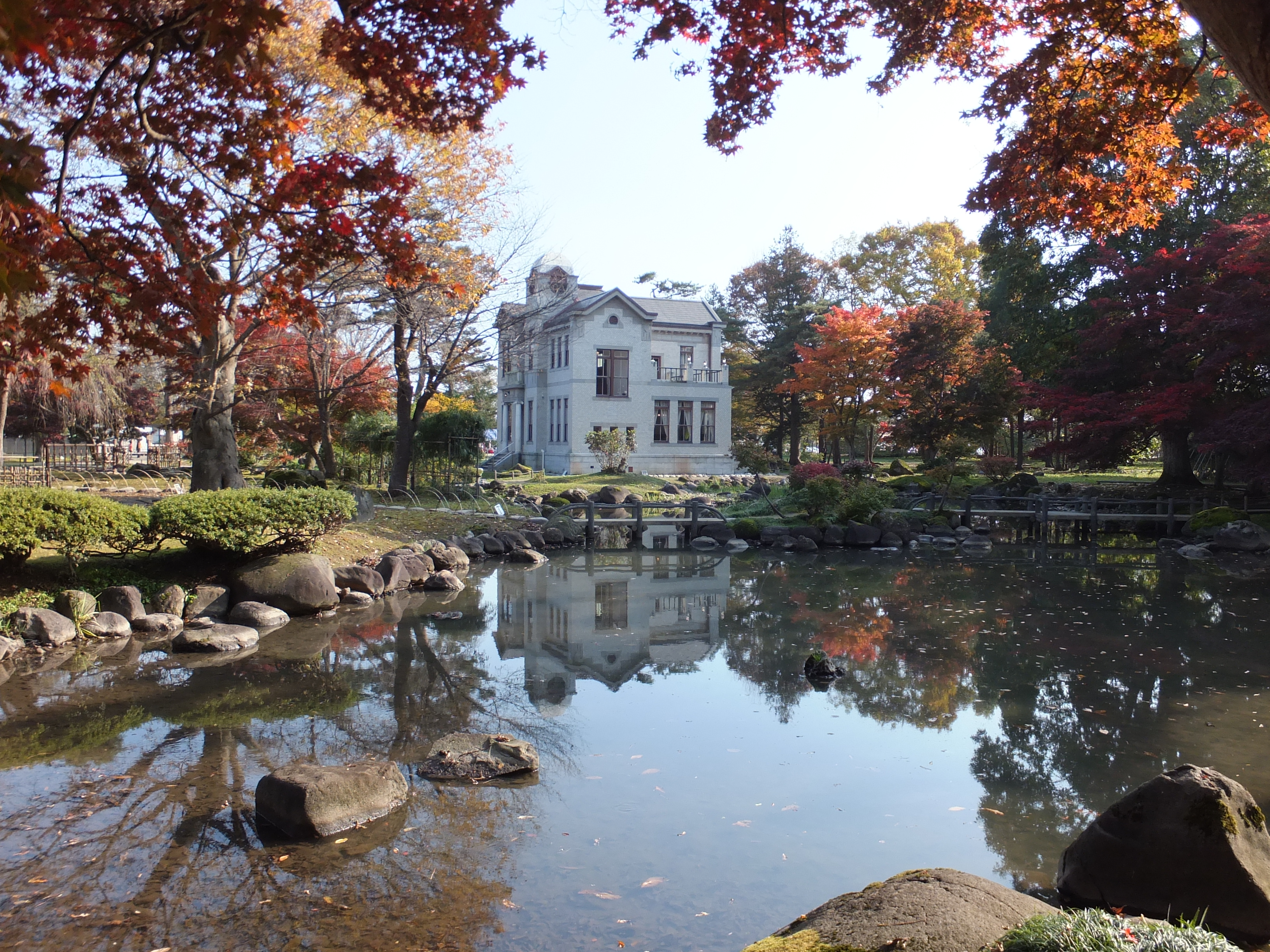
Ikeda family gardens

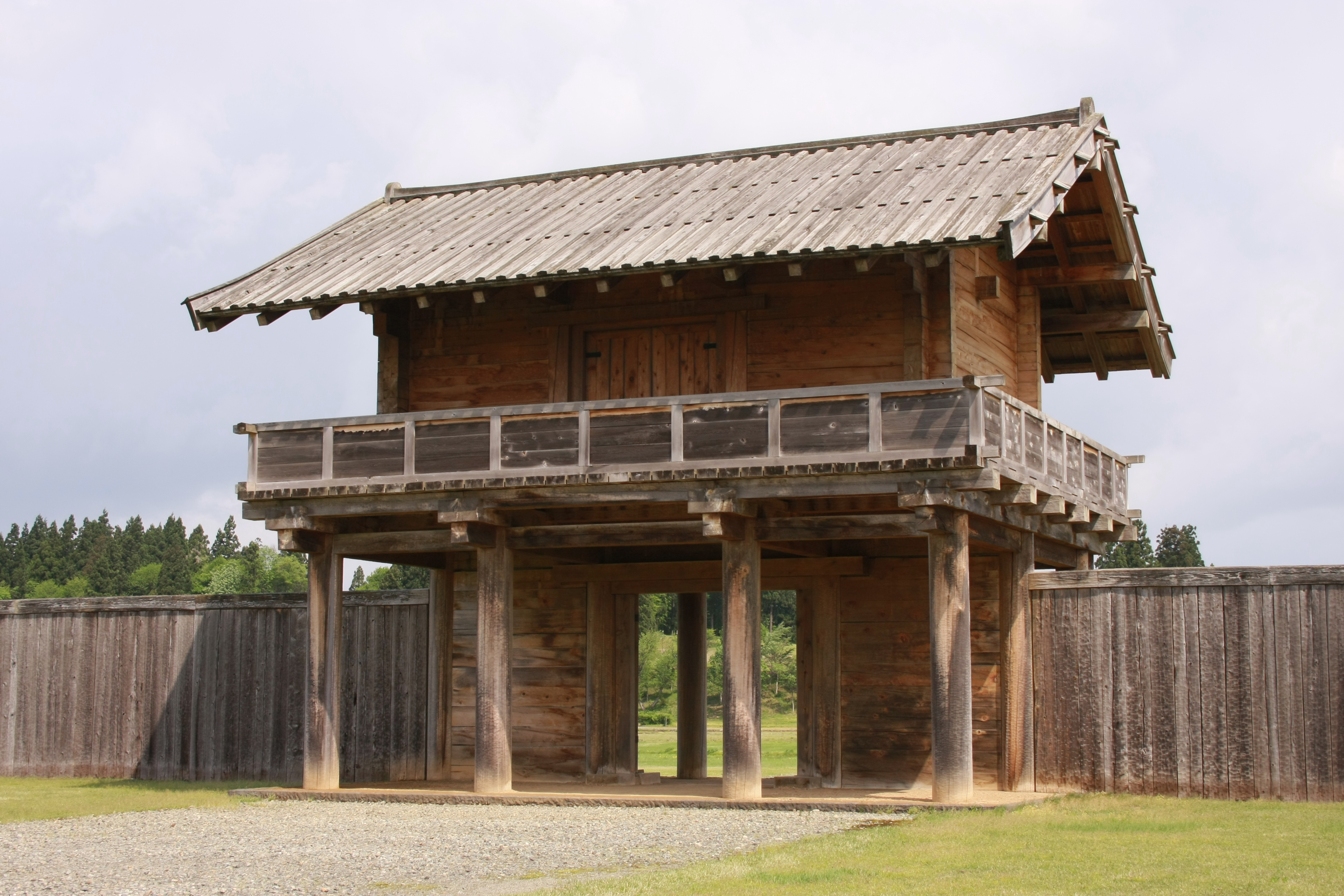
IHotta-no-saku ruins

Daisen (大仙市, Daisen-shi) is a city in Akita Prefecture, Japan. As of 28 February 2023, the city had an estimated population of 76,277 in 31,544 households, and a population density of 88 persons per km^{2}. The total area of the city is 866.79 square kilometres (334.67 sq mi). The city was created in 2005 by the merger of eight municipalities in the Omagari Semboku region. It is the venue for the National Fireworks Competition (Omagari Fireworks) and is known as the city of fireworks.

== Geography ==
Daisen is located in the flatlands of central Akita Prefecture. The area of the city is greater than the total metropolitan area of Tokyo. Daisen is bounded by the Ōu Mountains in the east, the Dewa Mountains in the center of the prefecture in the west, the former town of Kakumagawa between the Omono River and the Yokote River in the south, and the area slightly south of the summit of Mount Oishi in the north. The mountains of the Dewa Mountain Range in the western part of the city and the Ōu Mountains in the eastern part of the city surround the Senboku Plain in the northern part of the Yokote Basin. The Omono River, a first-class river, flows from the south to the northwest of the city. The highest peak in Daisen is Mount Kosugi (1,229 meters) in eastern Daisen.

=== Neighboring municipalities ===
Akita Prefecture

- Akita
- Misato
- Semboku
- Yokote
- Yurihonjō

Iwate Prefecture

- Nishiwaga

== Climate ==
Daisen has a humid continental climate (Köppen climate classification Dfa / Cfa) with large seasonal temperature differences, with warm to hot (and often humid) summers and cold (sometimes severely cold) winters. Precipitation is significant throughout the year but is heaviest from August to October. The average annual temperature in Daisen is 10.9 °C (51.6 °F). The average annual rainfall is 1,819.4 mm (71.63 in) with August as the wettest month. The temperature is highest on average in August, at around 24.3 °C (75.7 °F), and lowest in January, at around −1.6 °C (29.1 °F).

Climate data for Ōmagari, Daisen (elevation 30 m, 1991–2020 normals, extremes 1976–present)
Month	Jan	Feb	Mar	Apr	May	Jun	Jul	Aug	Sep	Oct	Nov	Dec	Year
Record high °C (°F)	10.2 (50.4)	19.6 (67.3)	23.3 (73.9)	31.2 (88.2)	32.9 (91.2)	34.3 (93.7)	37.6 (99.7)	37.3 (99.1)	35.7 (96.3)	31.3 (88.3)	24.4 (75.9)	17.6 (63.7)	37.6 (99.7)
Mean daily maximum °C (°F)	1.4 (34.5)	2.5 (36.5)	6.7 (44.1)	14.5 (58.1)	20.7 (69.3)	24.7 (76.5)	27.7 (81.9)	29.4 (84.9)	25.3 (77.5)	18.7 (65.7)	11.2 (52.2)	4.0 (39.2)	15.6 (60.1)
Daily mean °C (°F)	−1.6 (29.1)	−1.1 (30.0)	2.2 (36.0)	8.7 (47.7)	14.9 (58.8)	19.6 (67.3)	23.2 (73.8)	24.3 (75.7)	19.9 (67.8)	13.1 (55.6)	6.5 (43.7)	0.8 (33.4)	10.9 (51.6)
Mean daily minimum °C (°F)	−5.1 (22.8)	−4.8 (23.4)	−2.1 (28.2)	3.3 (37.9)	9.8 (49.6)	15.4 (59.7)	19.6 (67.3)	20.3 (68.5)	15.6 (60.1)	8.3 (46.9)	2.3 (36.1)	−2.2 (28.0)	6.7 (44.1)
Record low °C (°F)	−16.8 (1.8)	−17.6 (0.3)	−12.9 (8.8)	−9.6 (14.7)	−0.5 (31.1)	6.2 (43.2)	11.7 (53.1)	11.3 (52.3)	3.7 (38.7)	−1.3 (29.7)	−9.4 (15.1)	−16.2 (2.8)	−17.6 (0.3)
Average precipitation mm (inches)	150.7 (5.93)	111.0 (4.37)	105.9 (4.17)	99.3 (3.91)	113.8 (4.48)	128.8 (5.07)	212.1 (8.35)	212.4 (8.36)	166.4 (6.55)	158.6 (6.24)	183.6 (7.23)	175.3 (6.90)	1,819.4 (71.63)
Average precipitation days (≥ 1.0 mm)	22.7	19.3	16.8	13.3	12.1	11.1	13.4	12.5	13.3	15.4	19.3	22.8	192.0
Mean monthly sunshine hours	34.0	56.7	107.3	160.3	190.1	174.8	148.6	182.5	146.5	129.2	84.8	41.5	1,460.9
Source: Japan Meteorological Agency (1991–2020 normals, extremes 1976–present)

== Demographics ==
In Akita Prefecture, it has the third largest population after Akita City and Yokote City. Per Japanese census data, the population of Daisen peaked at around the year 1960 and has been in steady decline since then.

Historical population

Year	Pop.	±% p.a.
1920	87,814	—
1930	98,449	+1.15%
1940	101,120	+0.27%
1950	121,695	+1.87%
1960	120,366	−0.11%
1970	108,378	−1.04%

Year	Pop.	±% p.a.
1980	106,428	−0.18%
1990	103,564	−0.27%
2000	98,326	−0.52%
2010	88,299	−1.07%
2020	77,657	−1.28%

== History ==
The area of present-day Daisen was part of ancient Dewa Province. During the Edo period, the area came under the control of the Satake clan, who had been relocated to Kubota Domain from their former holdings in Hitachi Province. After the start of the Meiji period, and the establishment of the modern municipalities system, the area became part of Semboku District, Akita Prefecture in 1878.

The city of Daisen was established on March 22, 2005, from the merger of the city of Ōmagari, the towns of Kamioka, Kyōwa, Nakasen, Nishisenboku, Ōta and Semboku, and the village of Nangai (all from Semboku District).

== Government ==
After the merger, Daisen had the distinction of having the largest city assembly in all of Japan, 145 members. The city now has a mayor-council form of government with a directly elected mayor and a unicameral city legislature of 28 members. The city contributes five members to the Akita Prefectural Assembly. In terms of national politics, the city is part of Akita 3rd District of the lower house of the Diet of Japan.

== Economy ==
The economy of Daisen is based on agriculture and the area is noted for its rice production. Numerous sake brewers are located in Daisen.

== Education ==
Daisen has 20 public elementary schools and 13 public middle schools operated by the city government and five public high schools operated by the Akita Prefectural Board of Education. There is also one private high school. The prefecture also operates one special education school for the handicapped.

== Transportation ==
=== Railways ===
East Japan Railway Company - Akita Shinkansen

- Ōmagari

East Japan Railway Company - Ōu Main Line

- Ōmagari - Jingūji - Kariwano - Mineyoshikawa - Ugo-Sakai

East Japan Railway Company - Tazawako Line

- Uguisuno - Ugo-Nagano - Yariminai - Ugo-Yotsuya - Kita-Ōmagari - Ōmagari

=== Highways ===
- Akita Expressway
- National Route 13
- National Route 46
- National Route 105
- National Route 341

== Sister cities ==
- Tettnang, Germany
- (South Korea) Dangjin, Chungcheongnam-do, Korea
- Temecula, California, United States

== Media ==
- FM Hanabi

== Local attractions ==
- Former Ikeda Family Gardens, National Place of Scentic Beauty
- Hotta-no-saku, National Historic Site

== Notable people from Daisen ==
- Gotō Chūgai, writer
- Eiji Gotō, admiral in the Imperial Japanese Navy
- Kazuo Koike, manga writer
- Nobuhide Minorikawa, politician
- Kazuo Oga
- Hitoshi Okuda, Manga artist
- Sukeshiro Terata, politician
