= Ōta, Akita =

Dissolved municipality in Akita prefecture, Japan

Ōta (太田町, Ōta-machi) was a town located in Senboku District, Akita Prefecture, Japan.

In 2003, the town had an estimated population of 7,491 and a density of 72.47 persons per km^{2}. The total area was 103.36 km^{2}.

On March 22, 2005, Ōta, along with the city of Ōmagari; the towns of Kamioka, Kyōwa, Nakasen, Nishisenboku and Semboku; and the village of Nangai (all from Senboku District), merged to create the city of Daisen.
