= Nakasen, Akita =

Dissolved municipality in Akita prefecture, Japan

Nakasen (中仙町, Nakasen-machi) was a town located in Senboku District, Akita Prefecture, Japan.

In 2003, the town had an estimated population of 11,486 and a density of 145.54 persons per km^{2}. The total area was 78.92 km^{2}.

On March 22, 2005, Nakasen, along with the city of Ōmagari; the towns of Kamioka, Kyōwa, Nishisenboku, Ōta and Semboku; and the village of Nangai (all from Senboku District), merged to create the city of Daisen.

The town's annual festival, the Don Pan Matsuri, is held each summer and features a communal dance. The municipal clock plays the tune associated with the festival several times daily.
