= Kamioka, Akita =

Dissolved municipality in Akita prefecture, Japan

Kamioka (神岡町, Kamioka-machi) was a town located in Senboku District, Akita Prefecture, Japan.

In 2003, the town had an estimated population of 5,943 and a density of 169.03 persons per km^{2}. The total area was 35.16 km^{2}.

On March 22, 2005, Kamioka, along with the city of Ōmagari; the towns of Kyōwa, Nakasen, Nishisenboku, Ōta and Semboku; and the village of Nangai (all from Senboku District), merged to create the city of Daisen.
