= Misato, Akita =

Misato 美郷町
- Town
- Misato Town Hall

- Flag Seal
- Interactive map of Misato
- Coordinates: 39°25′16″N 140°32′38″E
- Country: Japan
- Region: Tōhoku
- Prefecture: Akita
- District: Semboku

Area
  - Total: 168.32 km^{2} (64.99 sq mi)

Population (January 31, 2023)
  - Total: 18,151
  - Density: 107.84/km^{2} (279.29/sq mi)
- Time zone: UTC+9 (Japan Standard Time)
- Climate: Cfa
- Phone number: 0187-84-1111
- Address: 30-1 Ueno-otome Tsuchizaki, Misato-cho, Semboku-gun, Akita-ken 019-1541
- Website: Official website
- Symbols
- Bird: Domestic goose
- Flower: Lavender
- Tree: Japanese red pine

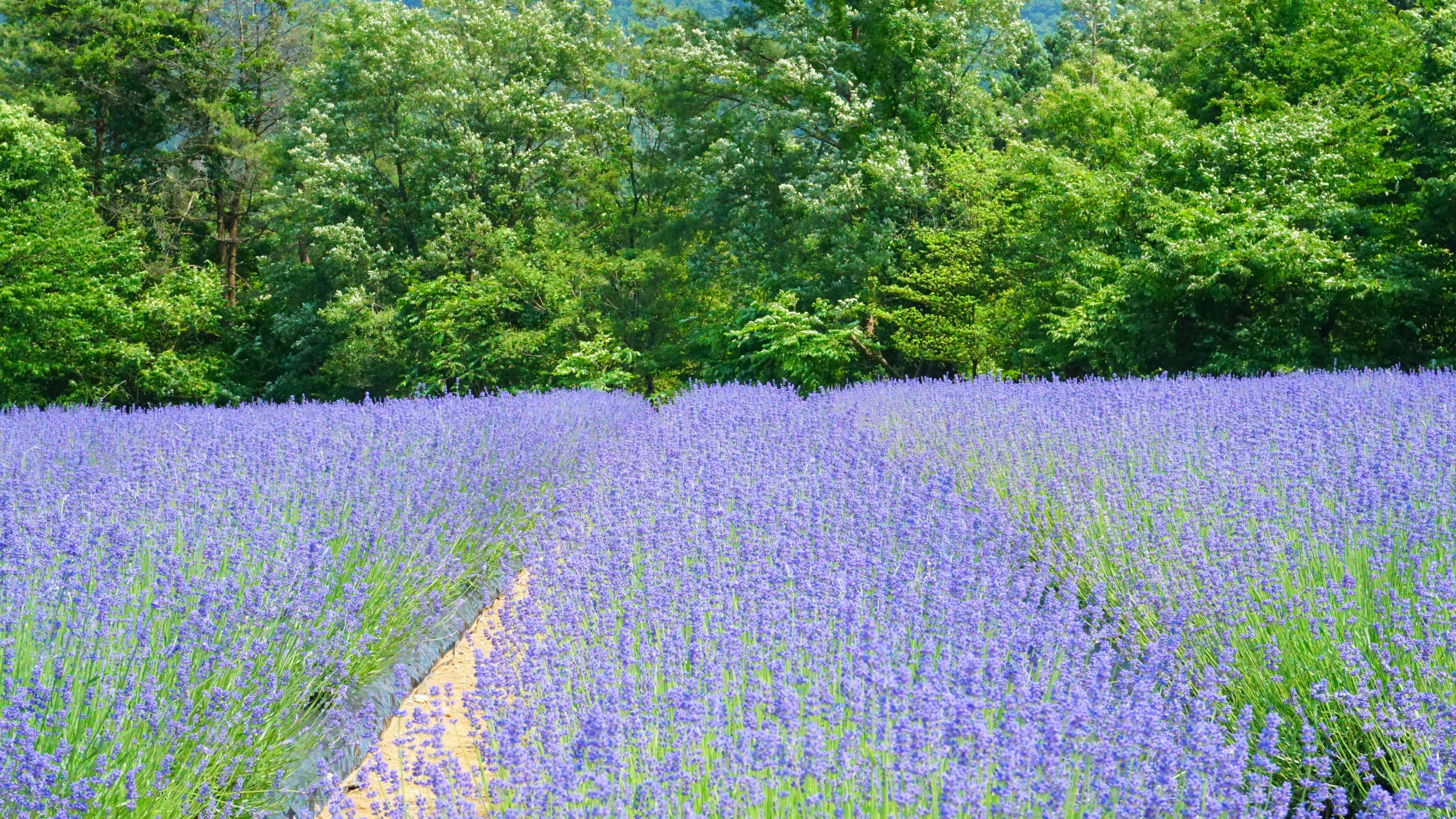
Lavender field in Misato

Sake brewers in Misato

Misato (美郷町, Misato-chō) is a town located in Akita Prefecture, Japan. As of 1 October 2025, the town had an estimated population of 18,613 in 5,999 households and a population density of 110 persons per km^{2}. The total area was 168.34 square kilometres (65.00 sq mi).

== Geography ==
Misato is located at the far southeastern of Akita Prefecture, bordered by the Ōu Mountains and Iwate Prefecture to the east. It is situated in the eastern part of the Yokote Basin, on alluvial fans formed by the Maruko River and its tributaries, with abundant spring water.

=== Neighboring municipalities ===
Akita Prefecture

- Daisen
- Yokote

Iwate Prefecture

- Nishiwaga

=== Climate ===
Misato has a humid continental climate (Köppen climate classification Cfa) with large seasonal temperature differences, with warm to hot (and often humid) summers and cold (sometimes severely cold) winters. Precipitation is significant throughout the year, but is heaviest from August to October. The average annual temperature in Misato is 14.3 °C. The average annual rainfall is 1743 mm with September as the wettest month. The temperatures are highest on average in August, at around 26.3 °C, and lowest in January, at around -3.8 °C.

== Demographics ==
Per Japanese census data, the population of Misato peaked at around the year 1960 and has been in steady decline since then.

Historical population

Year	Pop.	±% p.a.
1920	21,813	—
1930	23,779	+0.87%
1940	24,828	+0.43%
1950	30,342	+2.03%
1960	32,268	+0.62%
1970	27,981	−1.42%

Year	Pop.	±% p.a.
1980	26,356	−0.60%
1990	25,987	−0.14%
2000	24,207	−0.71%
2010	21,679	−1.10%
2020	18,613	−1.51%

== History ==
The area of present-day Misato was part of ancient Dewa Province, dominated by the Satake clan during the Edo period, who ruled Kubota Domain under the Tokugawa shogunate. The area was organized into six villages within Semboku District, Akita with the establishment of the modern municipalities system on April 1, 1889. The village of Rokugō was raised to town status in 1891. The town of Misato was established on November 1, 2004, from the merger of the towns of Senhata and Rokugō, with the village of Sennan.

== Government ==
Misato has a mayor-council form of government with a directly elected mayor and a unicameral town council of 16 members. Misato, together with the city of Daisen contributes five members to the Akita Prefectural Assembly. In terms of national politics, the town is part of Akita 3rd district of the lower house of the Diet of Japan.

== Economy ==
The economy of Misato is based on agriculture and forestry. Rice is the primary cash crop. Industries are centered around food processing, with sake brewing and fermented foods made from soybeans such as natto, miso, and soy sauce predominant.

== Education ==
Misato has three public elementary schools and one public middle school operated by the town government. The town has one public high school operated by the Akita Prefectural Board of Education.

== Transportation ==
=== Railway ===
East Japan Railway Company - Ōu Main Line

- Gosannen - Iizume

=== Highway ===
- National Route 13

== Sister cities ==
- Ruisui, Hualien, Taiwan (friendship city)

== Local attractions ==
- Hotta-no-saku, National Historic Site

== Noted people from Misato ==
- Kosugi Tengai, author
