= Senboku District, Akita =

District in Akita prefecture, Japan

Coordinates: 39.433°N 140.597°E

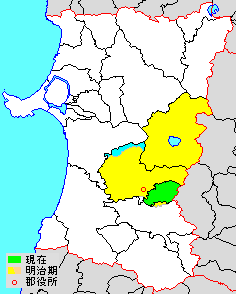
Map showing historic extent of Semboku District in Akita Prefecture colored area=original area; green=present area

Senboku District (仙北郡, Senboku-gun) is a rural district located in Akita, Japan.

At present time (as of June 2013), the district consists of only the town of Misato with an estimated population of 20,771 and an area of 168.36 km^{2}. All of the city of Senboku, most of the city of Daisen and part of the city of Yokote were formerly part of Senboku District.

== Towns and villages ==
- Misato

== History ==
The area of Senboku District was formerly part of Dewa Province, and was originally created out of Hiraka District in the year 870. Dewa Province was divided into the provinces of Ugo Province and Uzen Province following the Meiji Restoration on January 19, 1869, with the area of Semboku becoming part of Ugo Province. At the time, the area consisted of one town (Kakunodate) and 181 villages formerly under the control of Kubota Domain. Akita Prefecture was founded on December 13, 1871.

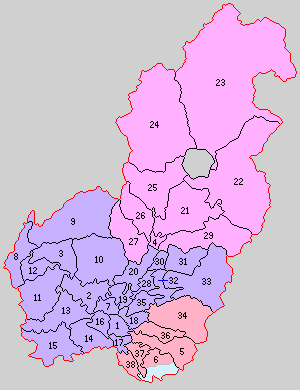
Historic Map of Semboku District: Purple - Daisen-shi: 1. Ōmagari; 2. Jinguji; 3. Shinkariwano; 7. Hanadate; 8. Yodokawa; 9. Arakawa; 10. Tsuchikawa; 11. Ozawagō; 12. Kowakubi; 13. Minaminaraoka; 14. Uchiotomo; 15. Sotootomo; 16. Ōkawa-Nishine; 17. Fujiki; 18. Takanashi; 19. Yotsuya; 20. Nagano; 28. Shimizu; 30. Toyokawa; 31. Toyooka; 32. Yokozawa; 33. Nagashida; 35. Yokobori; Light Blue - now part of Yokote-shi: 6. Kanazawa (southern portion); Pink - Semboku-shi: 4. Kakunodate; 21. Jindai; 22. Obonai; 23. Tazawa; 24. Hinokinai; 25. Saimyōji; 26. Nakagawa; 27. Kumosawa; 29. Shiraiwa; Salmon - Misato-machi: 5. Rokugō; 6. Kanazawa (northern portion); 34. Senya; 36. Hataya; 37. Iizume; 38. Kanazawa-Nishine

With the establishment of the municipality system on April 1, 1889, modern Senboku District, with one town (Kakunodate) and 37 villages was established.

- 1891 – Ōmagari and Rokugō were elevated to town status.
- 1897 – Kanazawa was elevated to town status.
- 1902 – Kariwano and Jinguji were elevated to town status.
- 1922 – Nagano was elevated to town status.
- 1953 – Obonai was elevated to town status.
- May 3, 1954 – The city of Ōmagari was established.
- March 31, 1955 – Jinguji was renamed Kamioka, Nagano was renamed Nakasen.
- September 30, 1956 – The southern portion of the town of Kanazawa was merged into the city of Yokote.
- 1957 – The town of Obonai became the town of Tazawako.
- April 1, 1969 – Kyōwa and Ōta were both established.
- April 1, 1974 – Senboku was established.
- March 1, 1986 – Senhata was elevated to town status.
- On November 1, 2004 – the towns of Rokugō and Senhata, and the village of Sennan were merged to create the town Misato.
- On March 22, 2005 – the towns of Kamioka, Kyōwa, Nakasen, Nishisemboku, Ōta and Semboku, and the village of Nangai were merged with the city of Ōmagari to create the city of Daisen.
- On September 20, 2005 – the towns of Kakunodate and Tazawako, and the village of Nishiki were merged to create the city of Semboku. Following this merger, Senboku District was left with only the town of Misato.
