= Akita Relay =

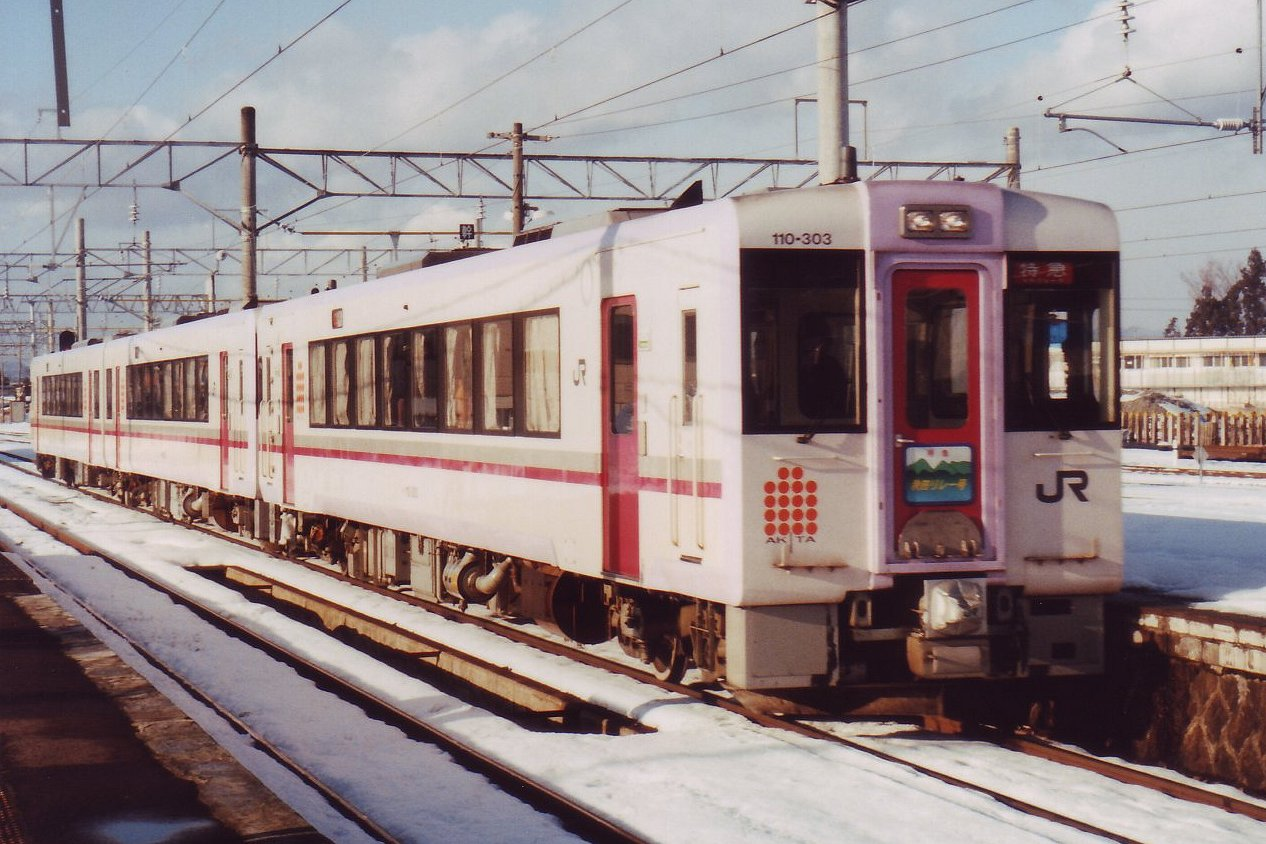
- KiHa 110-300 series DMU on an Akita Relay service at Akita Station, January 1997

Overview
- Service type: Limited express
- Status: Discontinued
- Locale: Tohoku region, Japan
- Predecessor: Tazawa
- First service: 30 March 1996
- Last service: 21 March 1997
- Successor: Komachi
- Former operator(s): JR East

Route
- Termini: Tokyo; Akita
- Line(s) used: Kitakami Line, Ōu Main Line

On-board services
- Class(es): Standard class only

Technical
- Rolling stock: KiHa 110-300 series DMU
- Track gauge: 1,067 mm (3 ft 6 in)
- Operating speed: 100 km/h (60 mph)

The Akita Relay (秋田リレー) was a limited express train service operated by East Japan Railway Company (JR East) in Japan between March 1996 and March 1997.

Engineering work to convert the Tazawako Line between Morioka and Ōmagari from 1,067 mm (3 ft 6 in) narrow gauge to 1,435 mm (4 ft 8 1/2 in) standard gauge for use by Akita Shinkansen services entailed the complete closure of the line between March 1996 and March 1997. The Tazawa limited express services that previously linked Morioka with Akita and Aomori were curtailed to run between Akita and Aomori only, and temporary Akita Relay limited express diesel services were operated instead between Kitakami on the Tōhoku Shinkansen and Akita via the Kitakami Line and Ōu Main Line.

Services commenced on 30 March 1996, with 10 "down" services and 11 "up" services operating daily using a specially built fleet of KiHa 110-300 series DMUs mostly in 4-car formations, but with some 3- or 7-car formations. These trains featured 2+2 abreast unidirectional limited express style seating identical to the seating used in E217 series EMU Green cars.

The Akita Relay services ended on 21 March 1997, the day before Akita Shinkansen Komachi services commenced between Morioka and Akita. The KiHa 110-300 series DMUs were subsequently refitted with standard seating, renumbered as KiHa 110-200 series, and reassigned for use on other lines such as the Iiyama Line.

== Schedules ==
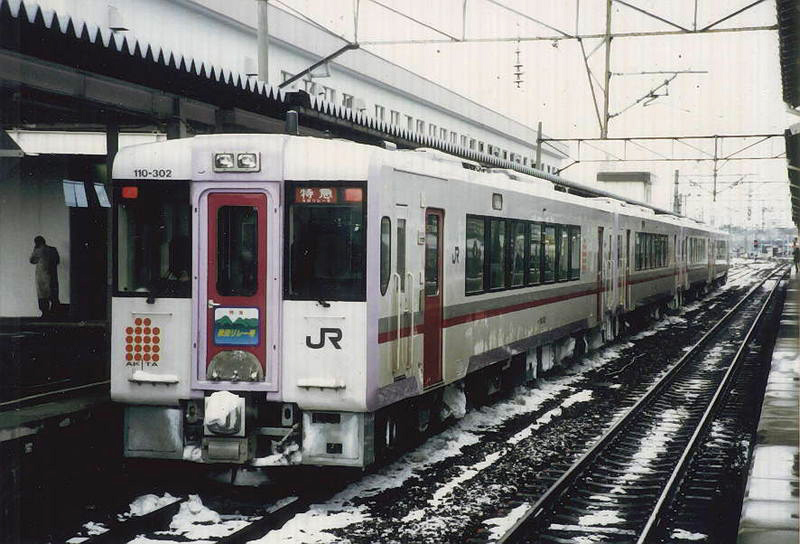
4-car Akita Relay formation at Kitakami Station, February 1997

=== Down (Kitakami → Akita) ===
Service	Train No.	From	Depart	To	Arrive
Akita Relay 1	3001D	Kitakami	09:26	Akita	11:31
Akita Relay 3	3003D	Kitakami	10:22	Akita	12:35
Akita Relay 5	3005D	Kitakami	11:24	Akita	13:38
Akita Relay 7	3007D	Kitakami	13:12	Akita	15:18
Akita Relay 9	3009D	Kitakami	14:18	Akita	16:46
Akita Relay 11	3011D	Kitakami	15:20	Akita	17:42
Akita Relay 13	3013D	Kitakami	16:17	Akita	18:35
Akita Relay 15	3015D	Kitakami	17:15	Akita	19:31
Akita Relay 17	3017D	Kitakami	18:57	Akita	21:10
Akita Relay 19	3019D	Kitakami	20:21	Akita	22:14

=== Up (Akita → Kitakami) ===
Service	Train No.	From	Depart	To	Arrive
Akita Relay 2	3002D	Akita	07:10	Kitakami	09:03
Akita Relay 4	3004D	Akita	08:04	Kitakami	10:05
Akita Relay 6	3006D	Akita	08:55	Kitakami	11:00
Akita Relay 8	3008D	Akita	10:04	Kitakami	12:06
Akita Relay 10	3010D	Akita	11:50	Kitakami	13:58
Akita Relay 12	3012D	Akita	12:51	Kitakami	14:58
Akita Relay 14	3014D	Akita	13:56	Kitakami	16:01
Akita Relay 16	3016D	Akita	14:48	Kitakami	16:57
Akita Relay 18	3018D	Akita	15:59	Kitakami	18:06
Akita Relay 20	3020D	Akita	17:00	Kitakami	19:14
Akita Relay 22	3022D	Akita	17:53	Kitakami	20:05

(Source:)

== See also ==
- List of named passenger trains of Japan
