= KiHa 100 series =

Japanese diesel multiple unit train type

KiHa 100/110 series
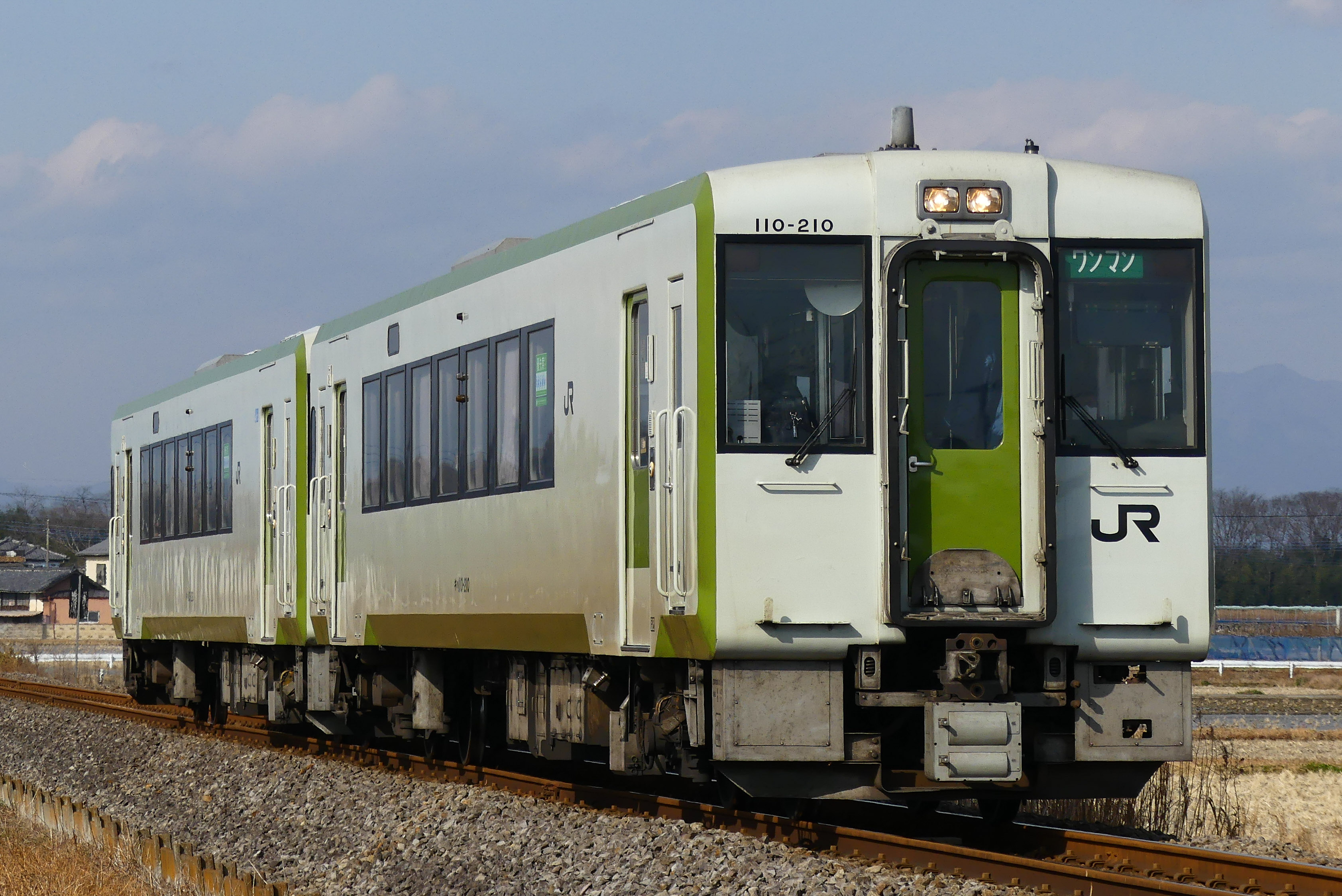
- KiHa 110-210 on the Hachiko Line in January 2019
- Stock type: Diesel multiple unit
- In service: 1990–present
- Manufacturers: Fuji Heavy Industries; Niigata Transys
- Replaced: KiHa 30, KiHa 58
- Constructed: 1989–1999
- Entered service: 1990
- Number built: 247
- Number in service: 242 (as of 1 January 2018)
- Number scrapped: 5 cars (of which, 4 due to tsunami damage)
- Formation: 1 or 2 cars
- Operators: JR East; Future: Hitachinaka Seaside Railway State Railway of Thailand

Specifications
- Car body construction: Steel
- Car length: 16.5–20.5 m (54–67 ft)
- Doors: Two per side
- Maximum speed: 100 km/h (62 mph)
- Weight: 24.9–39.4 t (55,000–87,000 lb)
- Safety system: ATS-S_{N}
- Multiple working: KiHa E120, KiHa E130 series
- Track gauge: 1,067 mm (3 ft 6 in)

The KiHa 100 and 110 series (Japanese: キハ100・110系) are diesel multiple unit (DMU) railcars operated by East Japan Railway Company (JR East) since 1990, primarily on non-electrified rural lines in Japan.

The "KiHa" designation derives from the classification system used by Japanese National Railways (JNR) for diesel railcars. "Ki" indicates a diesel-powered vehicle, while "Ha" indicates an ordinary passenger car, as opposed to a green car.

The KiHa 100 series comprises "short" cars measuring 16.5 to 17 metres (54 to 56 ft) in length, while the KiHa 110 series comprises "long" cars measuring 20 to 20.5 metres (66 to 67 ft).

A total of 247 vehicles were built between 1989 and 1999 by Fuji Heavy Industries and Niigata Transys.

== Operations ==
KiHa 100 and 110 series DMUs are based at the following depots and used on the following lines.

- Morioka, Ichinoseki, Hachinohe depots
  - Hanawa Line
  - Kamaishi Line
  - Kitakami Line
  - Ōfunato Line (Ichinoseki – Kesennuma)
  - Ōminato Line
  - Tohoku Main Line (Ichinoseki – Kitakami, Hanamaki – Morioka)
  - Yamada Line
- Kogota, Yamagata, Koriyama depots
  - Aterazawa Line (KiHa 101)
  - Banetsu East Line
  - Ishinomaki Line
  - Kesennuma Line (Maeyachi – Yanaizu)
  - Rikuu East Line
  - Rikuu West Line
- Niitsu depot
  - Banetsu West Line (Aizu-Wakamatsu – Niitsu–Niigata)
  - Uetsu Main Line (Niitsu – Sakata)
  - Hakushin Line
  - Yonesaka Line
- Nagano, Koumi depots
  - Iiyama Line
  - Koumi Line
- Takasaki depot
  - Hachikō Line (Komagawa – Takasaki) (KiHa 110–200, KiHa 111-200 + KiHa 112–200)

=== Past ===
- Iwaizumi Line (line closed in 2014)

== Variants ==
- KiHa 100: 16.5–17 m (54 ft 2 in – 55 ft 9 in) long single cars
- KiHa 101: 17 m (55 ft 9 in) long single cars
- KiHa 110: 20 m (65 ft 7 in) long single cars
- KiHa 111: 20 m (65 ft 7 in) long twin cars with toilet (coupled to KiHa 112)
- KiHa 112: 20 m (65 ft 7 in) long twin cars (coupled to KiHa 111)

== KiHa 100-0 ==
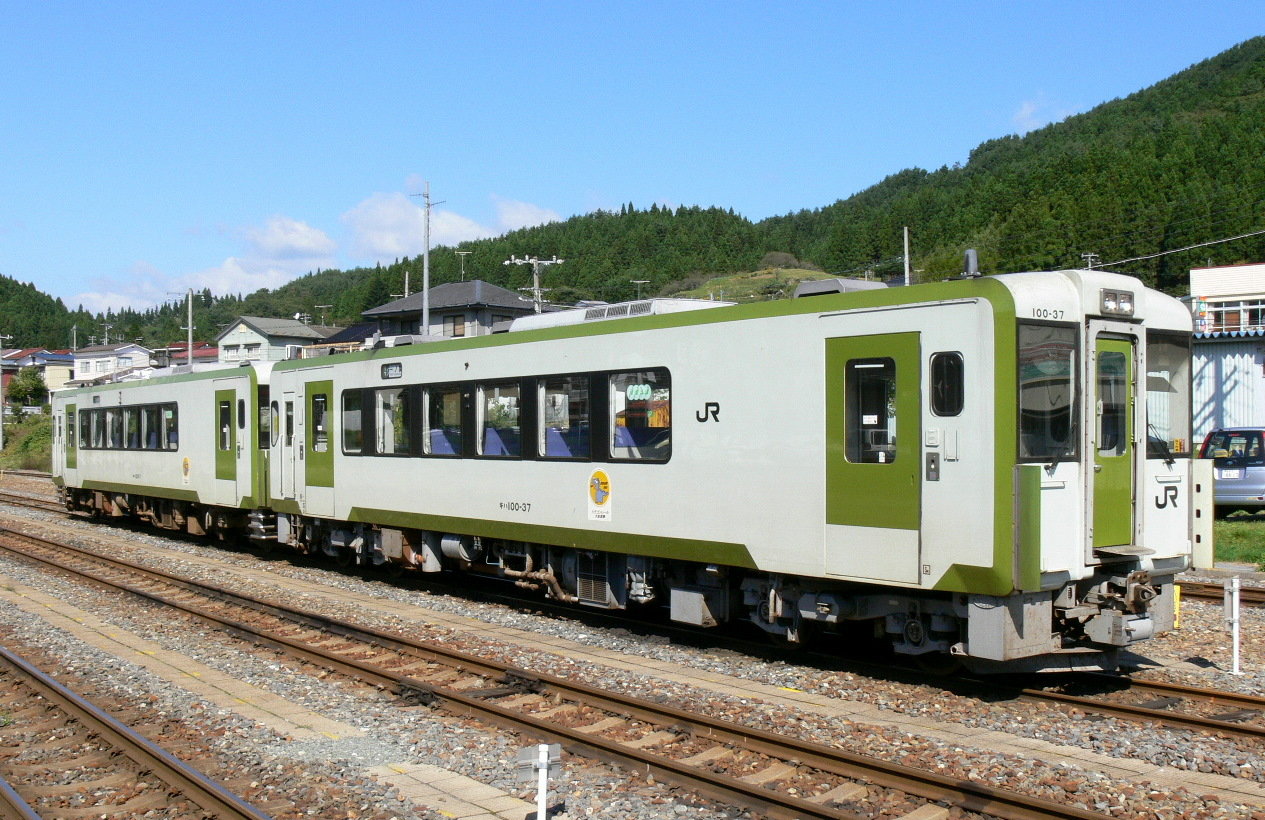
KiHa 100–37 in October 2006

The KiHa 100-0 series comprises 56 single-car units built between 1989 and 1991. The units are 16.5 metres (54 ft) long and have plug doors.

The first four pre-production cars were delivered from Niigata Tekkō (now Niigata Transys) to Ichinoseki Depot in January and February 1990. Cars KiHa 100-1 and -3 were equipped with one Cummins DMF14HZ 330 hp engine per car, while cars KiHa 100-2 and -4 were each equipped with one Komatsu DMF11HZ 330 hp engine. The four pre-production cars were initially delivered with black front ends, but these were subsequently repainted white and green to match the later production series cars.

Four production-series cars were then delivered from Fuji Heavy Industries in March 1991. These were each equipped with one Komatsu DMF11HZ 330 hp engine. Differences from the four pre-production series cars included abandoning of the three pairs of tip-up seats near the doorways, and elimination of the dummy exterior window at the toilet position.

38 2nd-batch cars were delivered from June to October 1991. Cars 9 to 29, built by Fuji Heavy Industries, were delivered to Morioka Depot, and cars 30 to 46, built by Niigata Tekkō, were delivered to Ichinoseki Depot. Cars 9 to 29 are each equipped with one Niigata Tekkō DMF13HZ 330 hp engine, and cars 30 to 46 are each equipped with one Komatsu DMF11HZ 330 hp engine. Differences from the earlier 1st-batch cars included solid front-end skirts instead of the earlier pipe-style skirts.

Batch	No.	Built	Capacity (Total/seated)	Weight
Pre-production	100‑1–100‑4	1990	104/41	24.9 t (55,000 lb)
1	100‑5–100‑8	1991	103/47	25.8 t (57,000 lb)
2	100‑9–100‑46	1991	103/47	25.8 t (57,000 lb)

== KiHa 100-200 ==
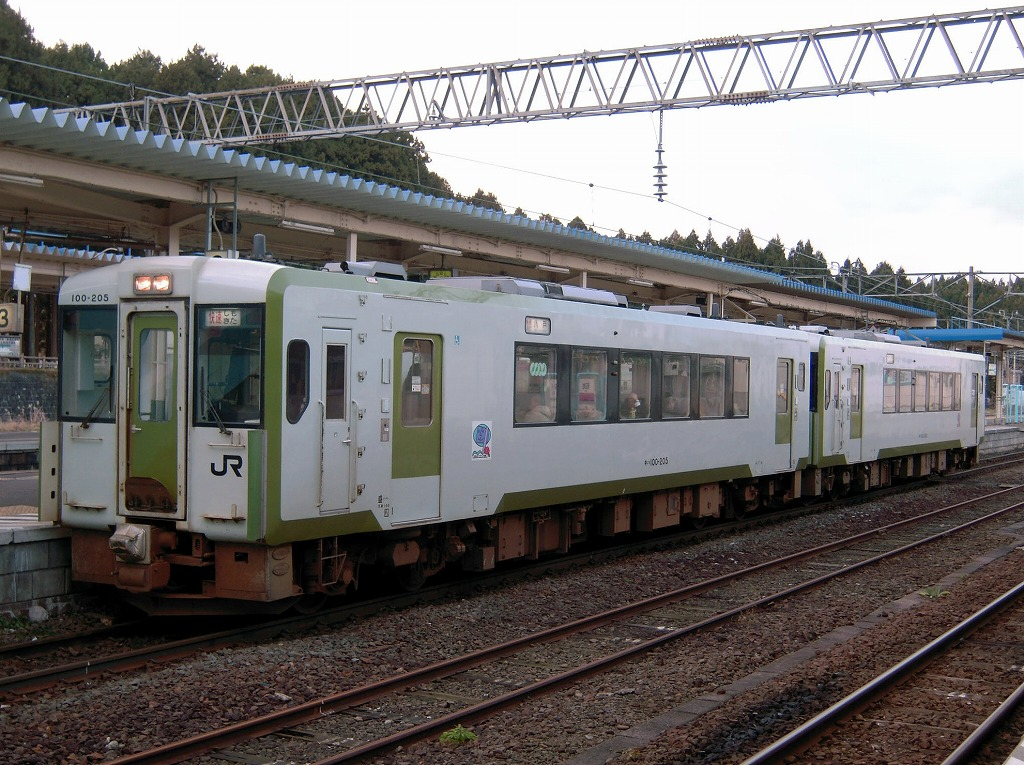
Ominato Line KiHa 100–200 series in December 2010

The KiHa 100-200 series comprises five single-car units built in 1993. The units are 17 metres (56 ft) long and have sliding doors.

The cars were delivered from Fuji Heavy Industries to Hachinohe Depot in 1993. The cab sections were extended by 250 mm to provide additional crash protection, giving an overall car length of 17,000 mm. Cars are each equipped with one Komatsu DMF11HZ 330 hp engine. A wheelchair space was provided next to one doorway, giving a seating capacity of 44 and total capacity of 103 passengers (59 standing).

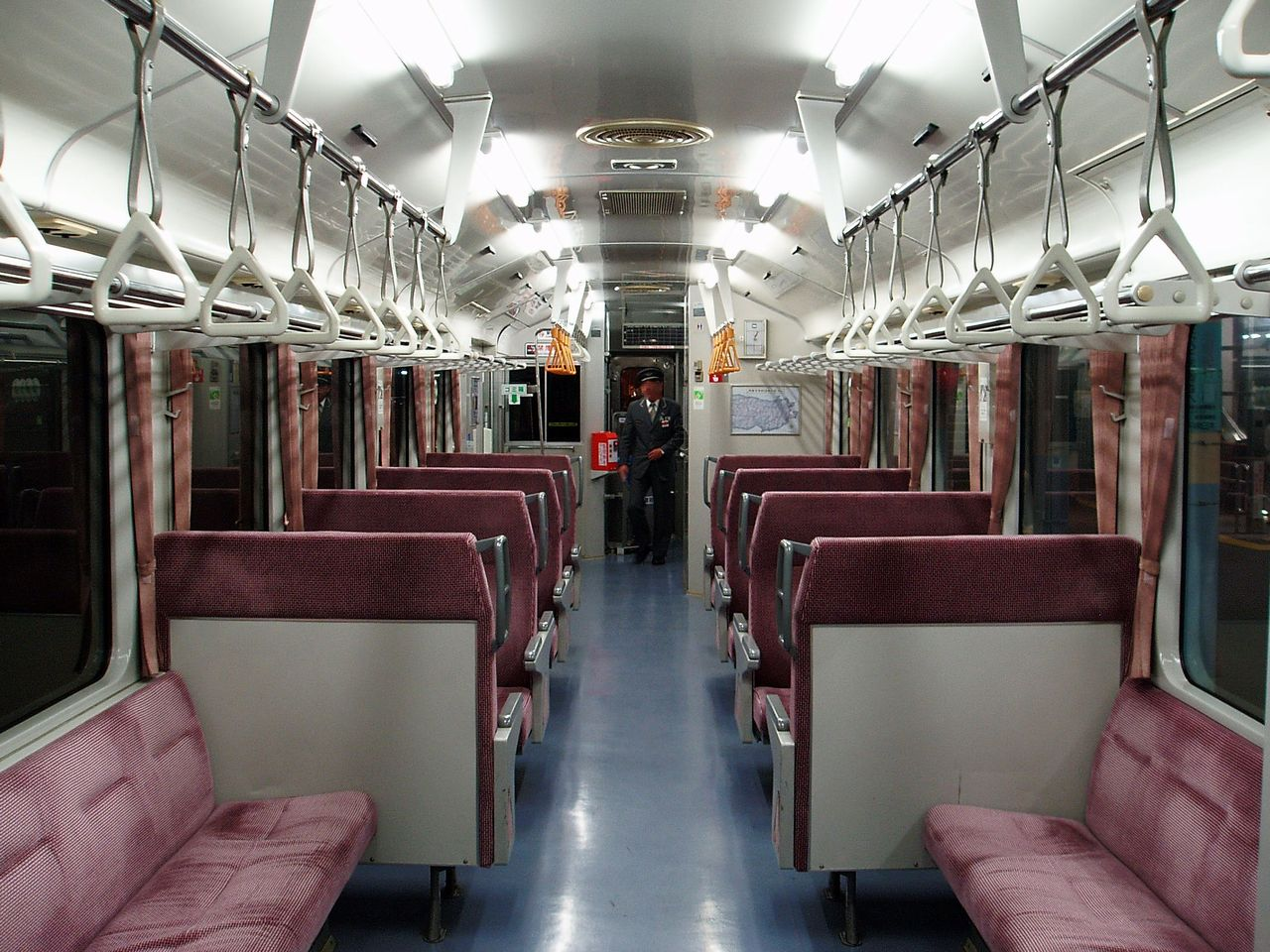
Interior view, showing 2+2 abreast seating, in June 2008

== KiHa 101 ==
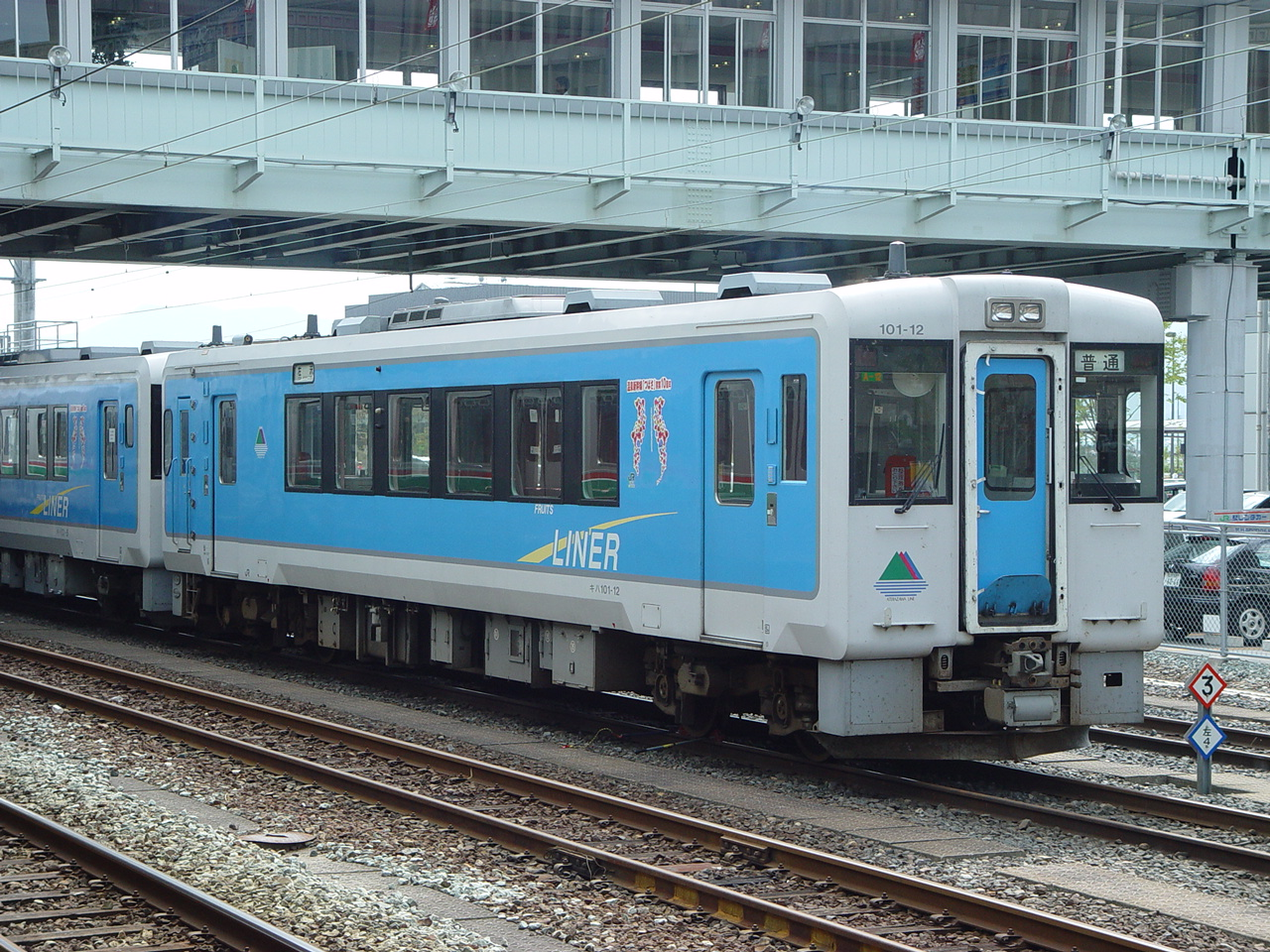
Aterazawa Line KiHa 101–12 in August 2002

The KiHa 101 series comprises 13 single-car units built between 1993 and 1997. The units are 17 metres (56 ft) long and have sliding doors used on Aterazawa Line services.

Batch	No.	Built	Capacity (Total/seated)	Weight
1	101‑1–101‑6	October 1993	107/44	27 t (60,000 lb)
2	101‑7–101‑11	September 1994	107/44	27 t (60,000 lb)
3	101‑12–101‑13	February 1997	107/44	27 t (60,000 lb)

A total of 13 KiHa 101 cars were built by Niigata Tekkō (now Niigata Transys) and allocated to Shinjō Depot for use on Aterazawa Line services. Broadly based on the KiHa 100–200 series cars, these are each equipped with one Komatsu DMF11HZ 330 hp engine. Passenger accommodation consists entirely of longitudinal bench seating. A wheelchair space was provided next to one doorway, giving a seating capacity of 44 and total capacity of 107 passengers (63 standing). The fleet is painted in an overall light blue colour scheme with "FRUITS LINER" logos.

== KiHa 110-0 ==
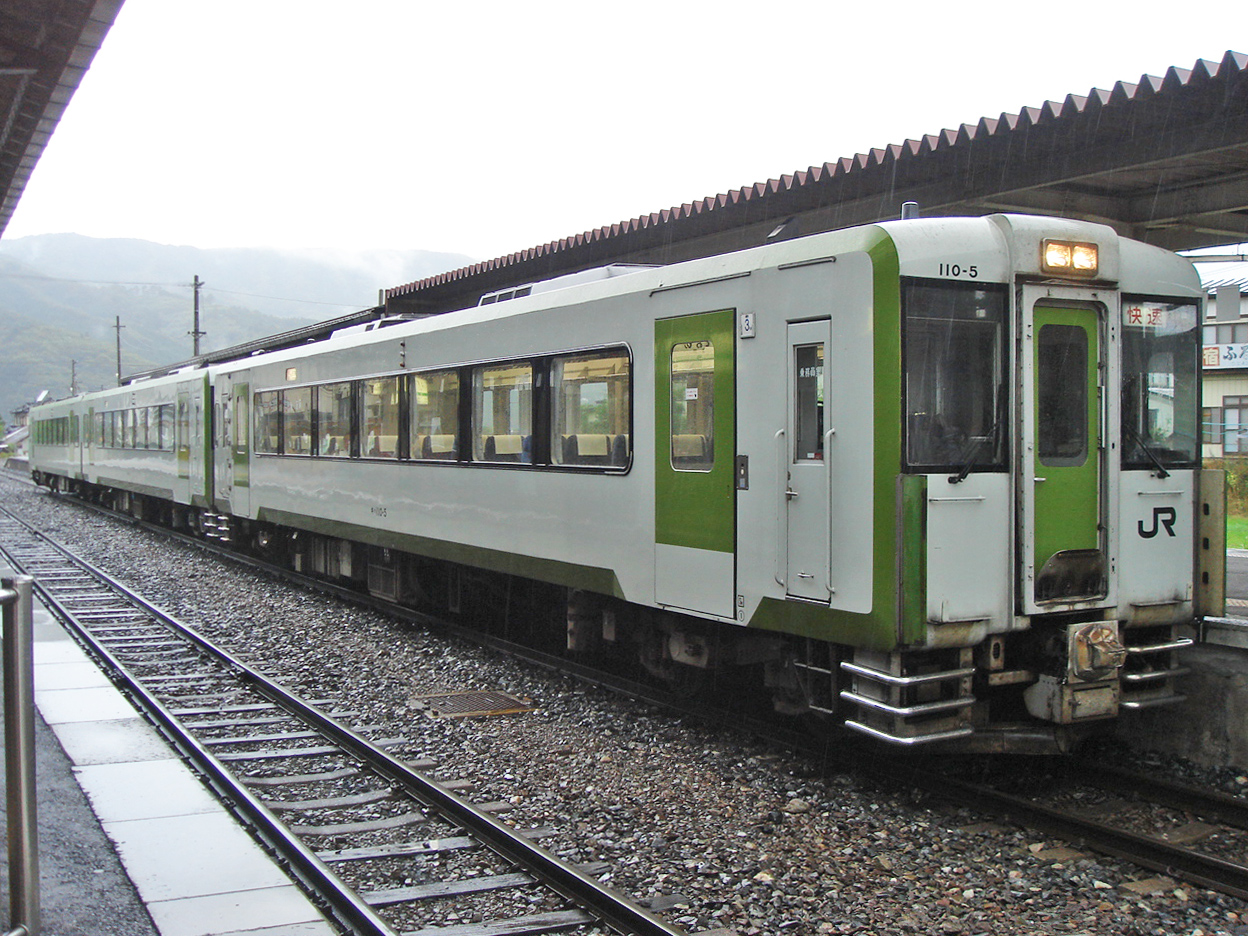
KiHa 110–5 on a Hamayuri rapid service in October 2006

The KiHa 110-0 series comprises 5 single-car units built between 1990 and 1991. The units are 20 metres (66 ft) long and have plug doors.

No.	Built	Manufacturer	Seats	Weight
110‑1	25 January 1990	Fuji Heavy Industries	52	39.4 t (87,000 lb)
110‑2	28 February 1990	Fuji Heavy Industries	52	39.4 t (87,000 lb)
110‑3	28 February 1990	Niigata Tekkō	52	39.4 t (87,000 lb)
110‑4	8 March 1991	Fuji Heavy Industries	52	39.4 t (87,000 lb)
110‑5	8 March 1991	Fuji Heavy Industries	52	39.4 t (87,000 lb)

Three pre-production cars were delivered to Morioka Depot between January and February 1990, with cars KiHa 110-1 and 2 built by Fuji Heavy Industries, and KiHa 110-3 built by Niigata Tekkō. As with the pre-production KiHa 100-0 cars, these initially had black front ends, pipe-style front-end skirts, black dummy exterior windows at the toilet positions, and plug doors. Cars KiHa 110-1 and 3 were equipped with Niigata DMF13HZA engines, while KiHa 110-2 was equipped with a Cummins DMF14HZA engine. All three cars used lightweight bolsterless DT58 motored bogies and TR242 trailer bogies, with both axles of the motor bogies driven.

Two production series cars, KiHa 110-4 and 5 were subsequently delivered to Morioka Depot from Fuji Heavy Industries in March 1991. These had standard white/green front ends and did not have dummy exterior windows at the toilet position. Both cars are equipped with Niigata DMF13HZA engines, and use DT58A motored bogies and TR242 trailer bogies.

From 2007, four cars, excluding KiHa 110–3, were transferred to Kogota Depot for use as reserved-seating cars on Minami Sanriku rapid services.

=== Interior ===
The KiHa 110–0 series cars were intended for use on Rikuchū express services, and are fitted with rotating/reclining seats, with a seating capacity of 52 per car.

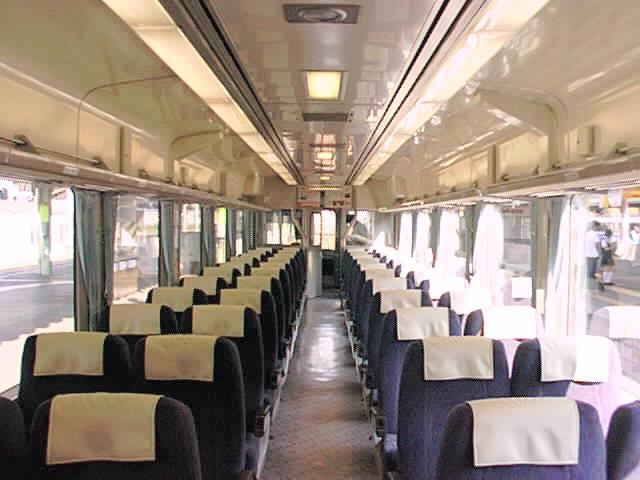
Interior of KiHa 110–0 series car in July 2000

== KiHa 110-100 ==
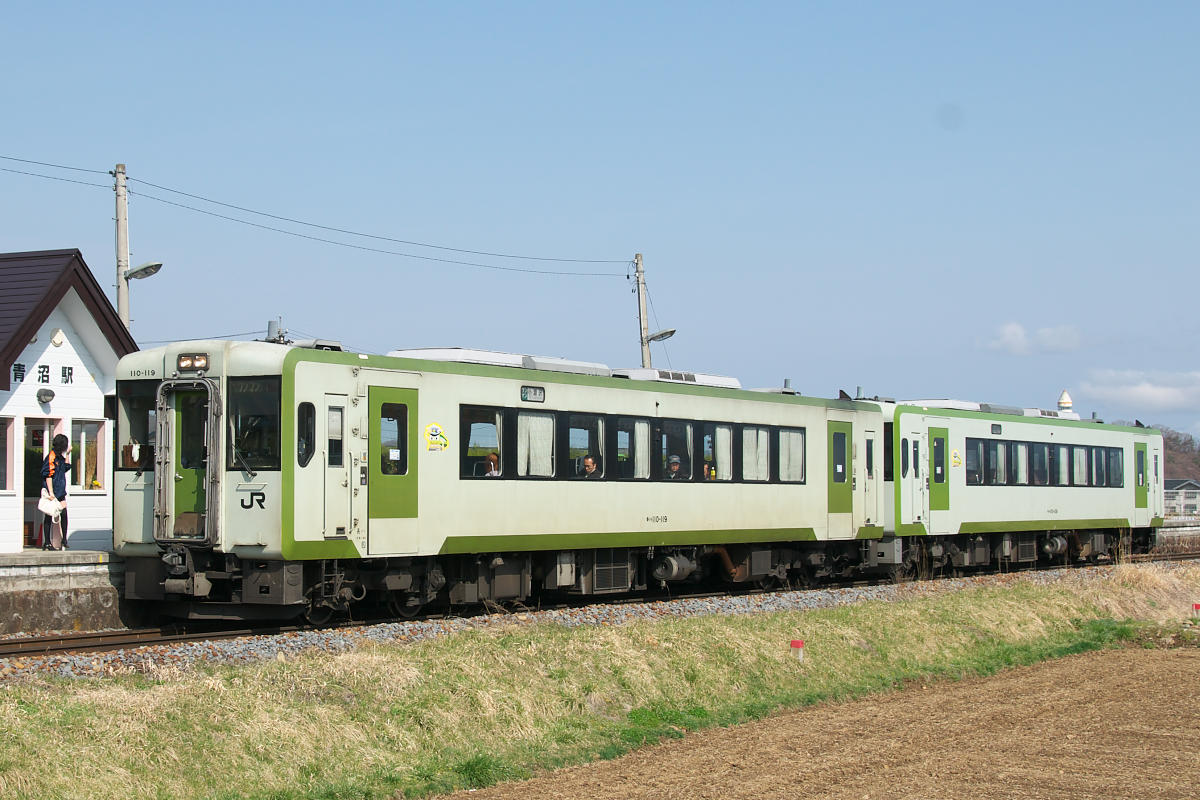
A pair of KiHa 110–100 series cars on the Koumi Line in April 2008

The KiHa 110-100 series comprises 39 single-car units built between 1991 and 1992. The units are 20 metres (66 ft) long and have plug doors.

Batch	No.	Built	Manufacturer	Initial depot
1	110‑101–110‑104	Feb 1991	Niigata Tekkō	Kōriyama
2	110‑105–110‑122	Aug 1991	Fuji Heavy Industries	Koumi
3	110‑123–110‑128	Sep 1991	Niigata Tekkō	Niigata
4	110‑129–110‑139	Jan 1992	Fuji Heavy Industries	Hitachi-Daigo

Cars KiHa 110–101 to 104 were built by Niigata Tekkō and delivered to Kōriyama Depot, cars KiHa 110–105 to 122 were built by Fuji Heavy Industries and delivered to Koumi Depot, cars KiHa 110–123 to 128 were built by Niigata Tekkō and delivered to Niigata Depot, and cars KiHa 110–129 to 139 were built by Fuji Heavy Industries and delivered to Hitachi-Daigo Depot. Differences from the KiHa 110–0 series cars included solid front-end skirts instead of the earlier pipe-style skirts and elimination of the dummy exterior window at the toilet position. All cars are equipped with Cummins DMF14HZA engines, and use DT58A motored bogies and TR242 trailer bogies.

=== Interior ===
Accommodation consists of fixed transverse seating arranged 2+1 abreast, with longitudinal bench seats at the ends of the cars. Seating capacity is 52 per car, with a total capacity of 119, including standing passengers.

== KiHa 110-200 ==
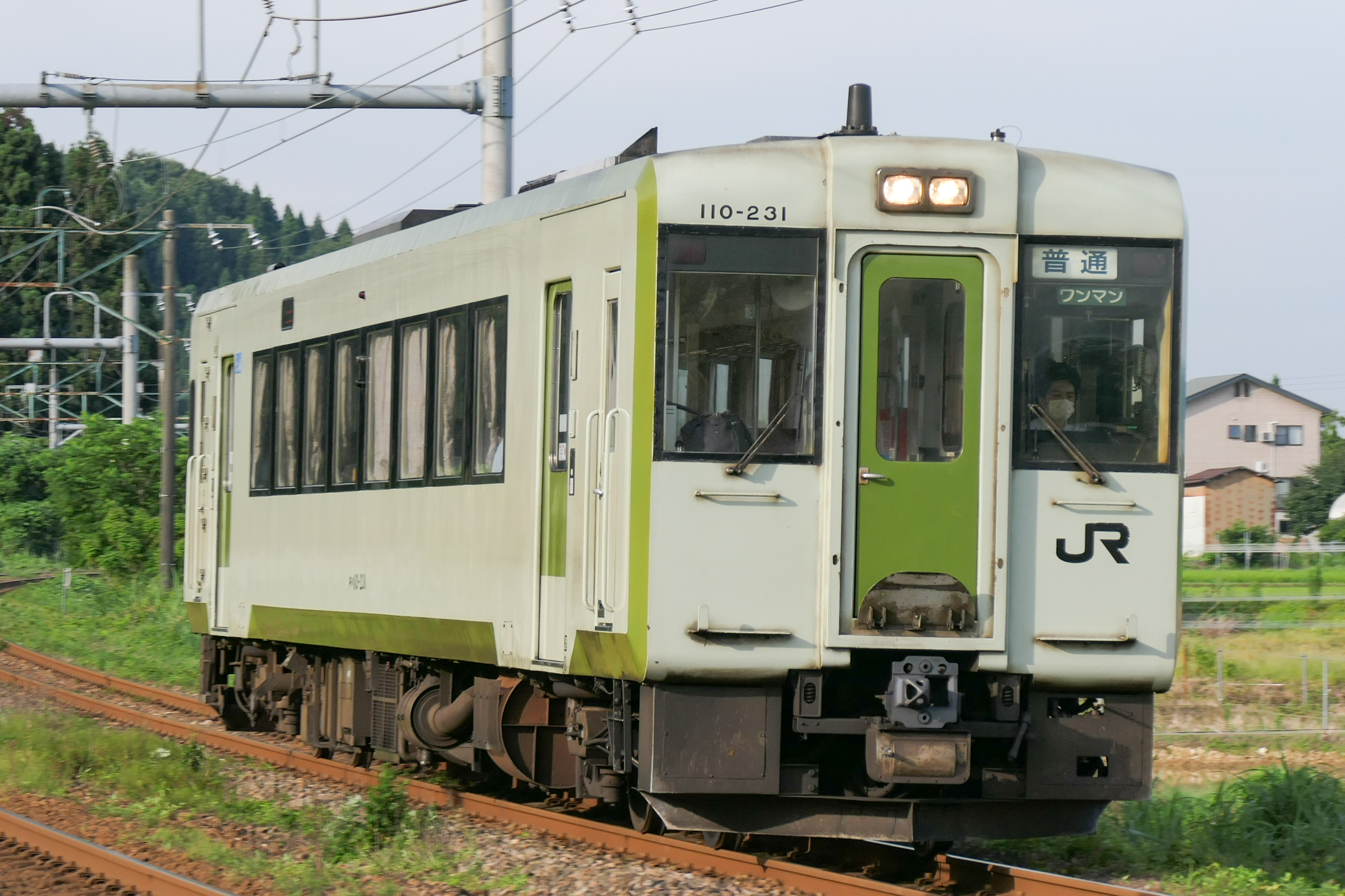
Joetsu Line KiHa 110–200 series in July 2022

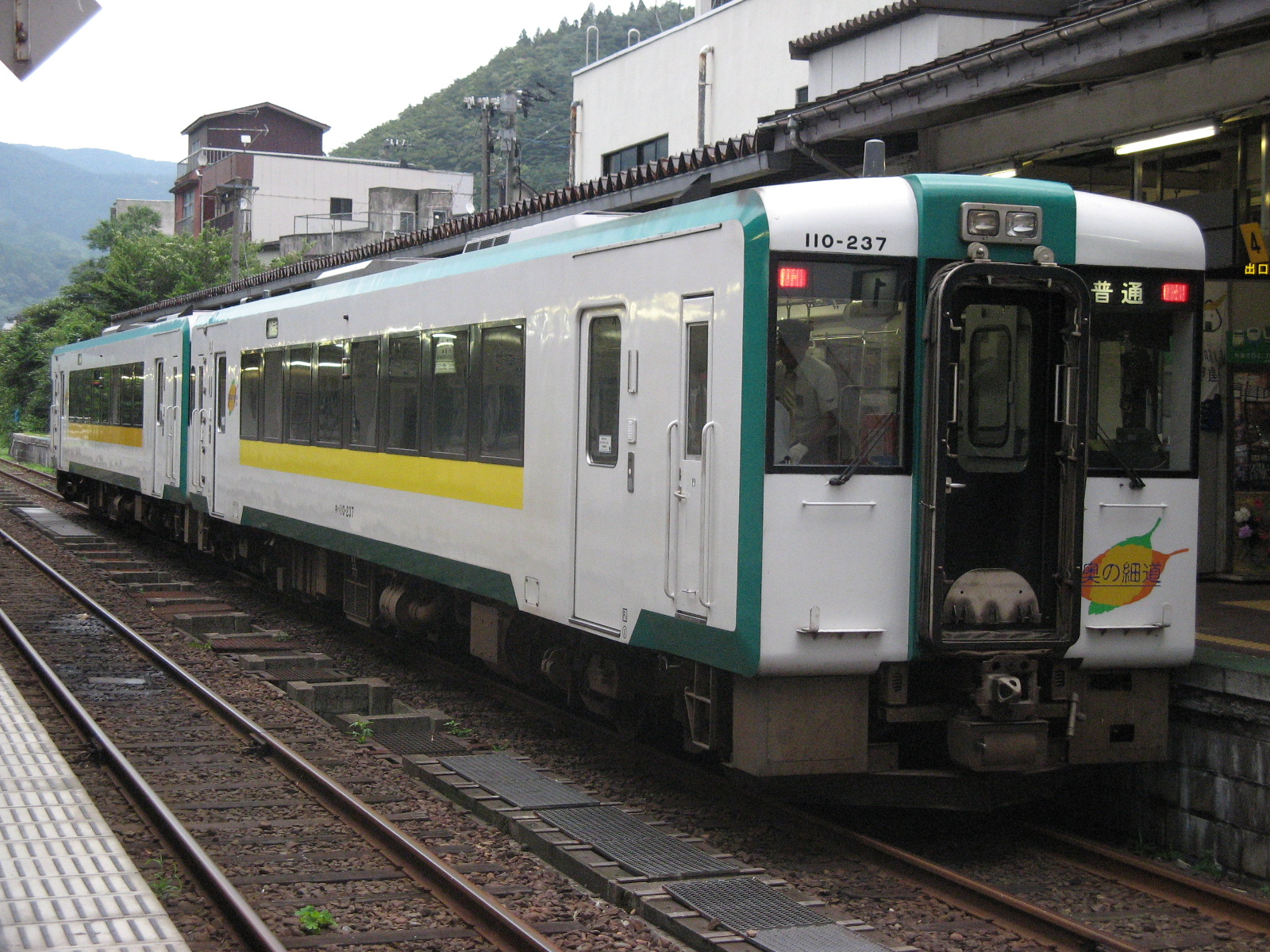
Rikuu East Line KiHa 110–200 series in August 2007

The KiHa 110-200 series comprises 45 single-car units built between 1993 and 1999. The units are 20 metres (66 ft) long and have sliding doors. Some cars had their cab ends extended by 250 millimetres (9.8 in) for increased crash protection. Fourteen cars were converted from the KiHa 110-300 series and had extended cab ends as delivered.

Batch	No.	Built/converted	Capacity (Total/seated)	Remarks
1	110‑201–110‑210	Feb 1993	118/53	
2	110‑211–110‑220	Oct 1993	121/50	Cab ends extended
3	110‑221–110‑222	Mar 1996	121/50	
4	110‑223–110‑224	Dec 1997	-	Converted from KiHa 110-301–302 at JR Kōriyama
5	110‑225–110‑234	Dec 1997	-	Converted from KiHa 110-303–314 at JR Nagano
6	110‑235–110‑236	Dec 1997	120/49	Converted from KiHa 110-303–314 at JR Nagano
7	110‑237–110‑239	Nov 1998	120/48	
8	110‑240–110‑242	Nov 1999	-	
9	110‑243–110‑245	Nov 1999	-	

=== Interior ===
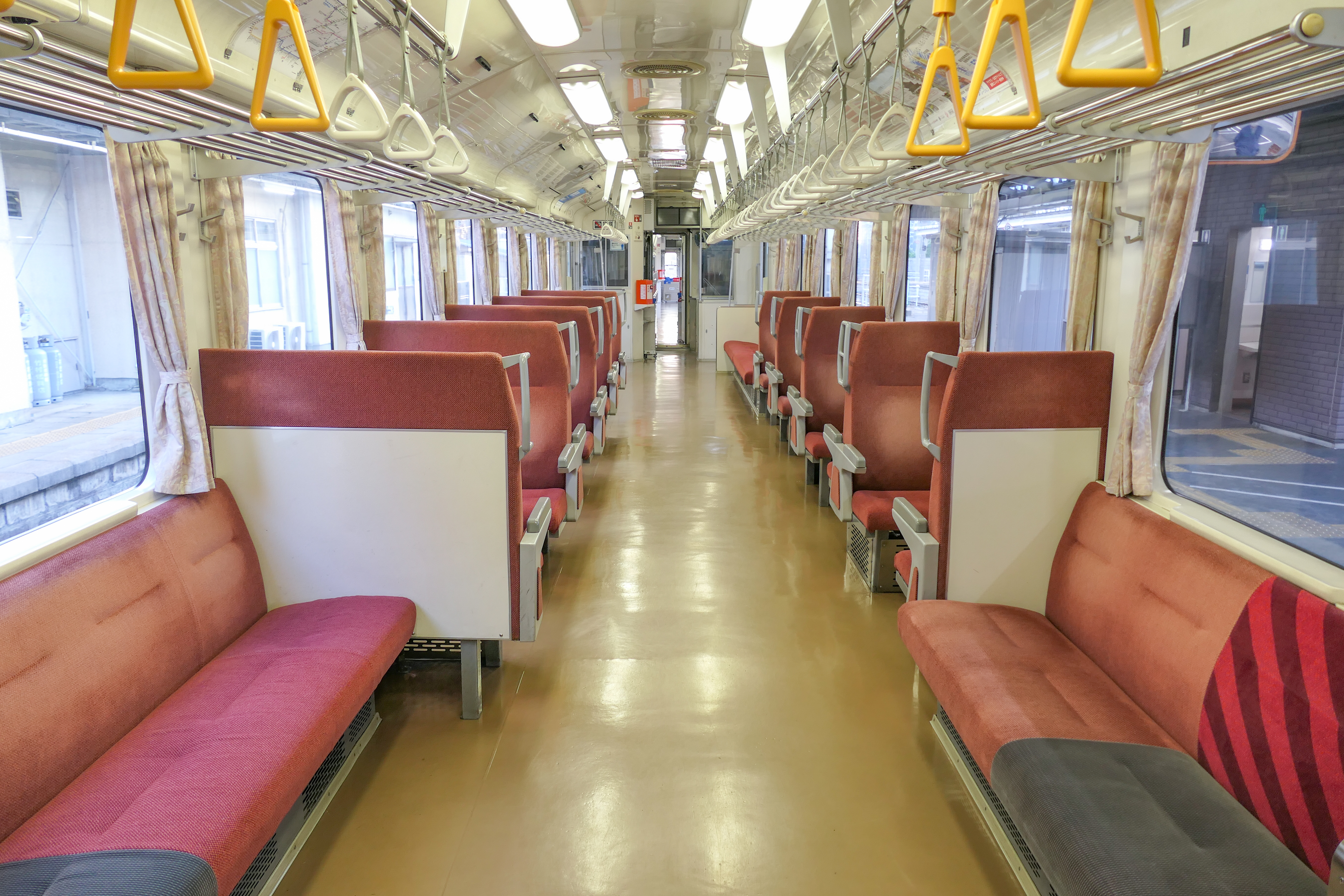
Interior of KiHa 110–228 series in May 2022

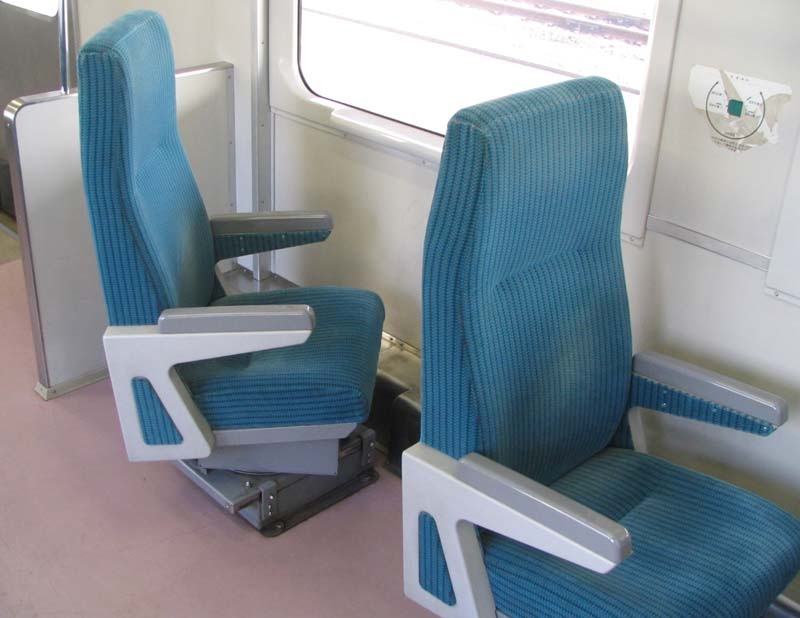
Rikuu West Line KiHa 110–200 series in February 2007

== KiHa 110-300 ==
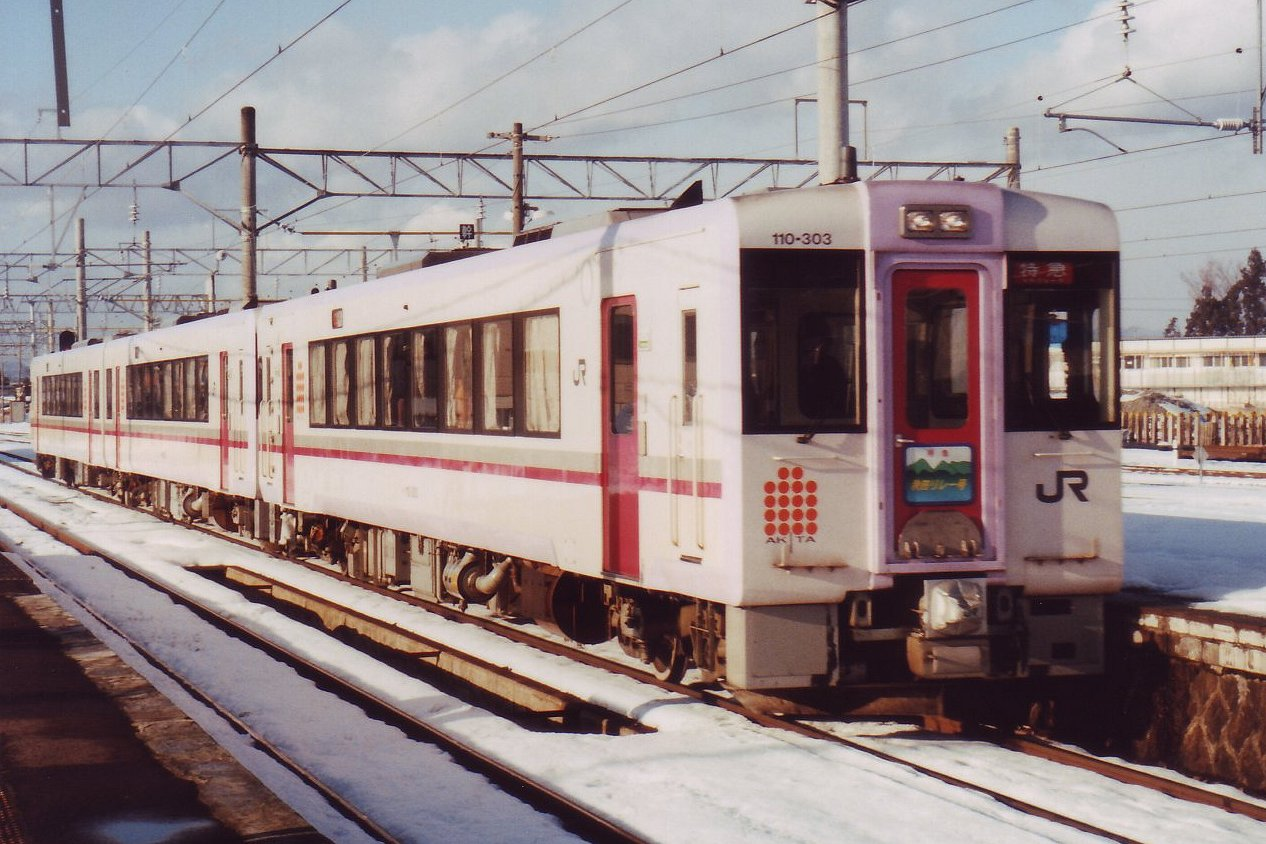
KiHa 110–300 series DMU on Akita Relay service at Akita Station in January 1997

The KiHa 110-300 series comprised 14 single-car units built between December 1995 and February 1996. The units were 20.5 metres (67 ft) long and had sliding doors. They were used for the Akita Relay, a limited express service that operated until the opening of the Akita Shinkansen. Following the opening, the cars were converted to the KiHa 110-200 specification between May and December 1997.

No.	Built	Manufacturer	Seats	Weight	Initial depot	Notes
110‑301	18 December 1995	Fuji Heavy Industries	49	31.9 t (70,000 lb)	Minami-Akita	Converted into 110-223 on 17 November 1997 at JR Kōriyama
110‑302	18 December 1995	Fuji Heavy Industries	49	31.9 t (70,000 lb)	Minami-Akita	Converted into 110-224 on 3 December 1997 at JR Kōriyama
110‑303	18 December 1995	Fuji Heavy Industries	49	31.9 t (70,000 lb)	Minami-Akita	Converted into 110-225 on 31 May 1997 at JR Nagano
110‑304	25 December 1995	Fuji Heavy Industries	49	31.9 t (70,000 lb)	Minami-Akita	Converted into 110-226 on 31 May 1997 at JR Nagano
110‑305	25 December 1995	Fuji Heavy Industries	49	31.9 t (70,000 lb)	Minami-Akita	Converted into 110-227 on 31 May 1997 at JR Nagano
110‑306	16 February 1996	Fuji Heavy Industries	49	31.9 t (70,000 lb)	Minami-Akita	Converted into 110-228 on 26 June 1997 at JR Nagano
110‑307	16 February 1996	Fuji Heavy Industries	49	31.9 t (70,000 lb)	Minami-Akita	Converted into 110-229 on 9 July 1997 at JR Nagano
110‑308	16 February 1996	Fuji Heavy Industries	49	31.9 t (70,000 lb)	Minami-Akita	Converted into 110-230 on 9 July 1997 at JR Nagano
110‑309	15 February 1996	Niigata Tekkō	49	31.9 t (70,000 lb)	Minami-Akita	Converted into 110-231 on 9 July 1997 at JR Nagano
110‑310	15 February 1996	Niigata Tekkō	49	31.9 t (70,000 lb)	Minami-Akita	Converted into 110-232 on 1 August 1997 at JR Nagano
110‑311	15 February 1996	Niigata Tekkō	49	31.9 t (70,000 lb)	Minami-Akita	Converted into 110-233 on 1 August 1997 at JR Nagano
110‑312	16 February 1996	Niigata Tekkō	49	31.9 t (70,000 lb)	Minami-Akita	Converted into 110-234 on 8 October 1997 at JR Nagano
110‑313	16 February 1996	Niigata Tekkō	49	31.9 t (70,000 lb)	Minami-Akita	Converted into 110-235 on 1 August 1997 at JR Nagano
110‑314	16 February 1996	Niigata Tekkō	49	31.9 t (70,000 lb)	Minami-Akita	Converted into 110-236 on 1 August 1997 at JR Nagano

== KiHa 111-0 + KiHa 112-0 ==
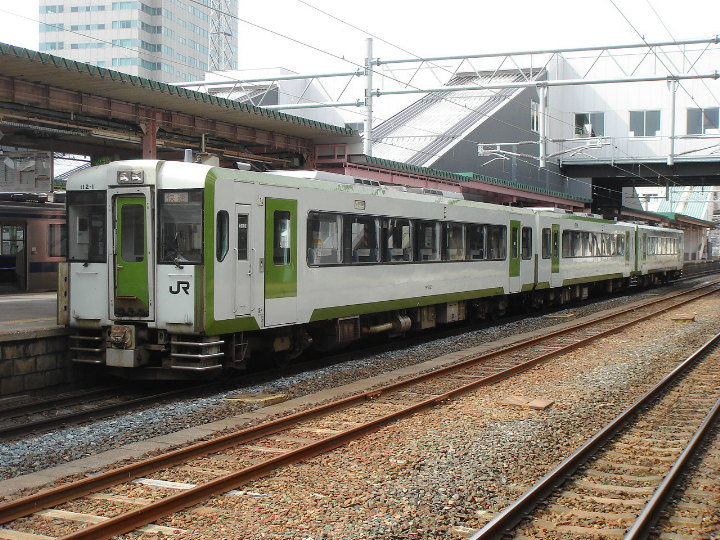
KiHa 112-1 + KiHa 111-1 at Morioka Station on a Hamayuri rapid service in March 2007

The KiHa 111-0 and 112-0 series comprises 6 two-car units built in 1990. The units are 20 metres (66 ft) long and have plug doors.

No.	Built	Manufacturer	Seats		Weight		Initial depot
No.	Built	Manufacturer	KiHa 111	KiHa 112	KiHa 111	KiHa 112	Initial depot
111‑1 + 112‑1	30 March 1991	Niigata Tekkō	60	64	29.8 t (66,000 lb)	29.3 t (65,000 lb)	Morioka
111‑2 + 112‑2	30 March 1991	Niigata Tekkō	60	64	29.8 t (66,000 lb)	29.3 t (65,000 lb)	Morioka
111‑3 + 112‑3	30 March 1991	Niigata Tekkō	60	64	29.8 t (66,000 lb)	29.3 t (65,000 lb)	Morioka

Three 2-car sets were built by Niigata Tekkō and delivered to Morioka Depot in March 1991. These were generally built to the same specifications as the full-production KiHa 110-0 cars, with plug doors, pipe-style front-end skirts. All cars are equipped with Niigata DMF13HZA engines, and have lightweight bolsterless DT58A motored bogies and TR242 trailer bogies.

=== Interior ===
The KiHa 111-0/112-0 cars were intended for use on Rikuchū express services, and are fitted with rotating/reclining seats. The KiHa 111 cars are fitted with a toilet.

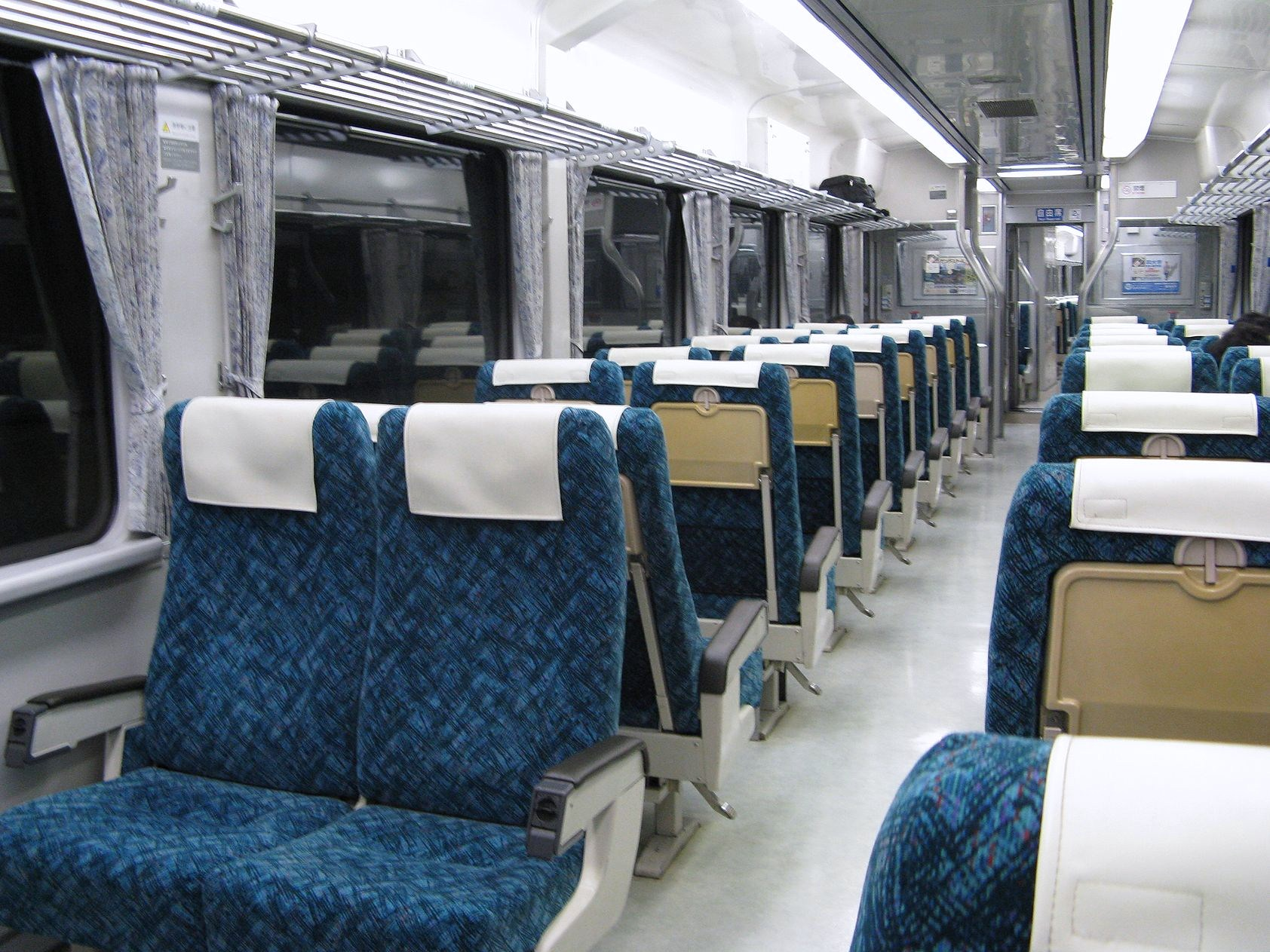
Interior of car KiHa 111–1 in August 2009

== KiHa 111-100 + KiHa 112-100 ==
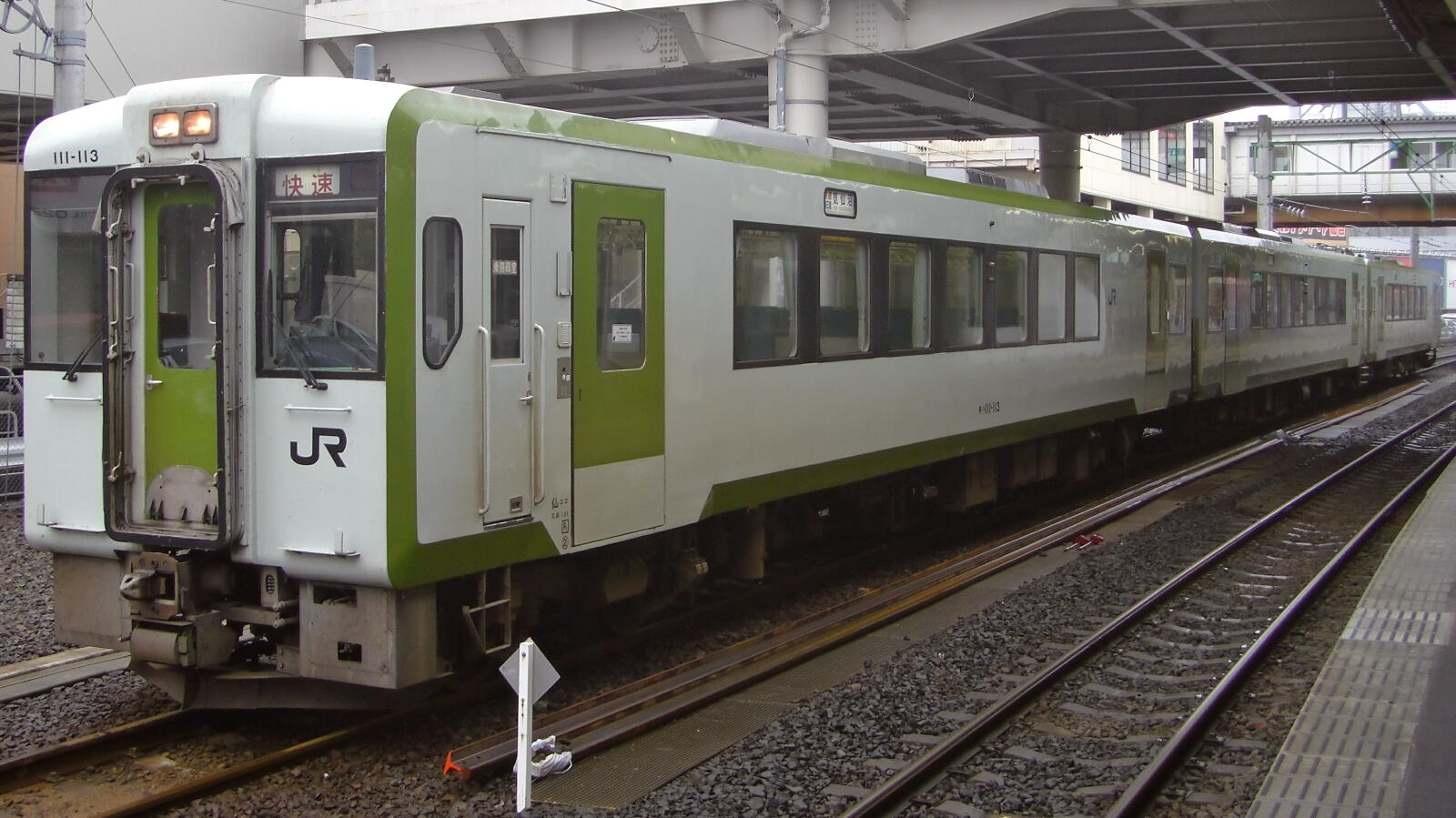
KiHa 111-113 + 112-113 at Sendai in July 2008

The KiHa 111-100 and 112-100 series comprises 42 two-car units built between 1991 and 1992. The units are 20 metres (66 ft) long and have plug doors.

Batch	No.	Built	Manufacturer	Capacity (total/seated)		Weight		Initial depot
Batch	No.	Built	Manufacturer	KiHa 111	KiHa 112	KiHa 111	KiHa 112	Initial depot
1	111‑101 + 112‑101–111‑108 + 112‑108	Mar 1991	Niigata Tekkō	131/58	136/62	30.3 t (67,000 lb)	29.8 t (66,000 lb)	Kōriyama
2	111‑109 + 112‑109–111‑111 + 112‑111	Dec 1991	Niigata Tekkō	131/58	136/62	30.3 t (67,000 lb)	29.8 t (66,000 lb)	Koumi
3	111‑112 + 112‑112–111‑121 + 112‑121	Feb 1992	Fuji Heavy Industries	131/58	136/62	30.3 t (67,000 lb)	29.8 t (66,000 lb)	Hitachi-Daigo

Cars KiHa 111/112-101 to 108 were built by Niigata Tekkō and delivered to Kōriyama Depot between February and March 1991, cars KiHa 111/112-109 to 111 were also built by Niigata Tekkō and delivered to Koumi Depot in December 1991, cars KiHa 111/112-112 to 121 were built by Fuji Heavy Industries and delivered to Hitachi-Daigo Depot in February 1992. As with the KiHa 111/112-0 cars, these cars had plug doors, but had solid front-end skirts instead of the earlier pipe-style skirts. All cars are equipped with Cummins DMF14HZA engines, and use DT58A motored bogies and TR242 trailer bogies.

Following the introduction of new KiHa E130 DMUs on the Suigun Line, cars KiHa 111/112-112 to 121 original based at Hitachi-Daigo Depot were reallocated to Morioka and Kogota depot in 2007.

=== Interior ===
Interior accommodation consists of a mixture of 2+1 fixed transverse seating bays in the centre of the cars and longitudinal bench seating at the ends of cars. The KiHa 111 cars are fitted with a toilet.

== KiHa 111-150 + KiHa 112-150 ==
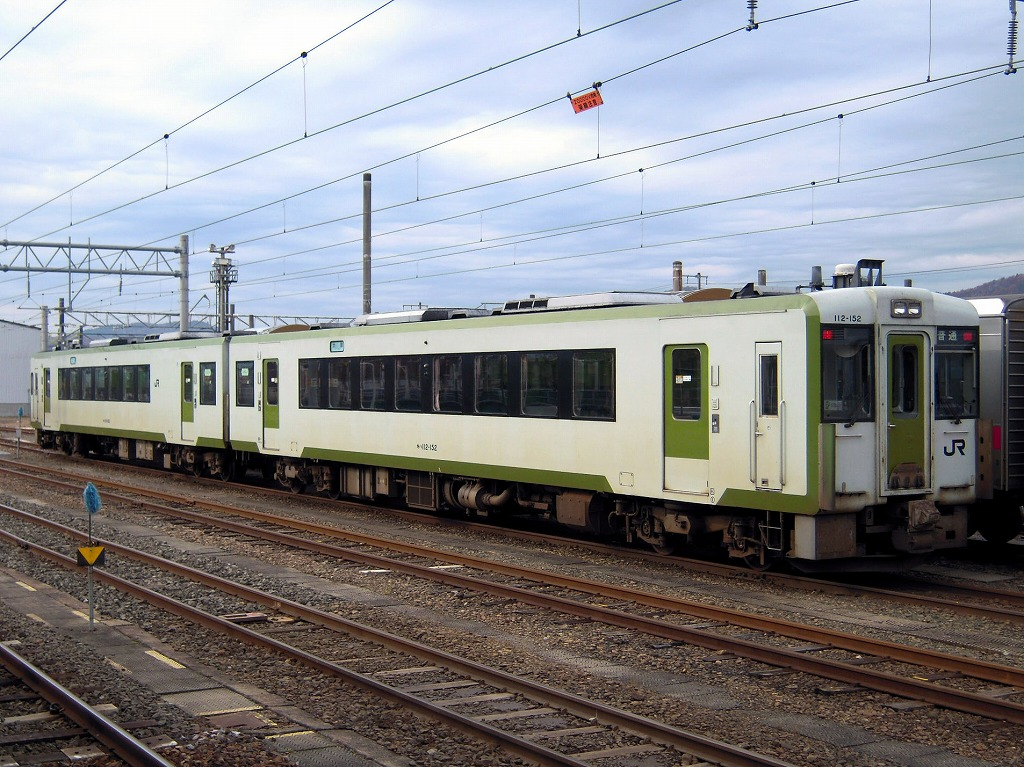
KiHa 111-152 + KiHa 112–152 at Odate Station in November 2010

The KiHa 111-150 and 112-150 series comprises 4 two-car units built in 1993. The units are 20.5 metres (67 ft) long and have sliding doors.

No.	Built	Manufacturer	Capacity (Total/seated)		Weight		Initial depot allocation
No.	Built	Manufacturer	KiHa 111	KiHa 112	KiHa 111	KiHa 112	Initial depot allocation
111‑151 + 112‑151	27 September 1994	Fuji Heavy Industries	135/55	138/62	31.7 t (70,000 lb)	31.2 t (69,000 lb)	Suigun
111‑152 + 112‑152	27 September 1994	Fuji Heavy Industries	135/55	138/62	31.7 t (70,000 lb)	31.2 t (69,000 lb)	Suigun

Four cars, KiHa 111/112-151 to 152, were built by Fuji Heavy Industries and delivered to Suigun Depot in September 1994. These cars were built to the same specifications as the earlier (but later-numbered) KiHa 111/112-200 cars, with sliding doors. All cars are equipped with Cummins DMF14HZA engines, and use DT58A motored bogies and TR242 trailer bogies.

As with the KiHa 111/112-100 series cars, these were reallocated to Morioka Depot between 2007 and 2008 following the introduction of new KiHa E130 DMUs on the Suigun Line.

== KiHa 111-200 + KiHa 112-200 ==
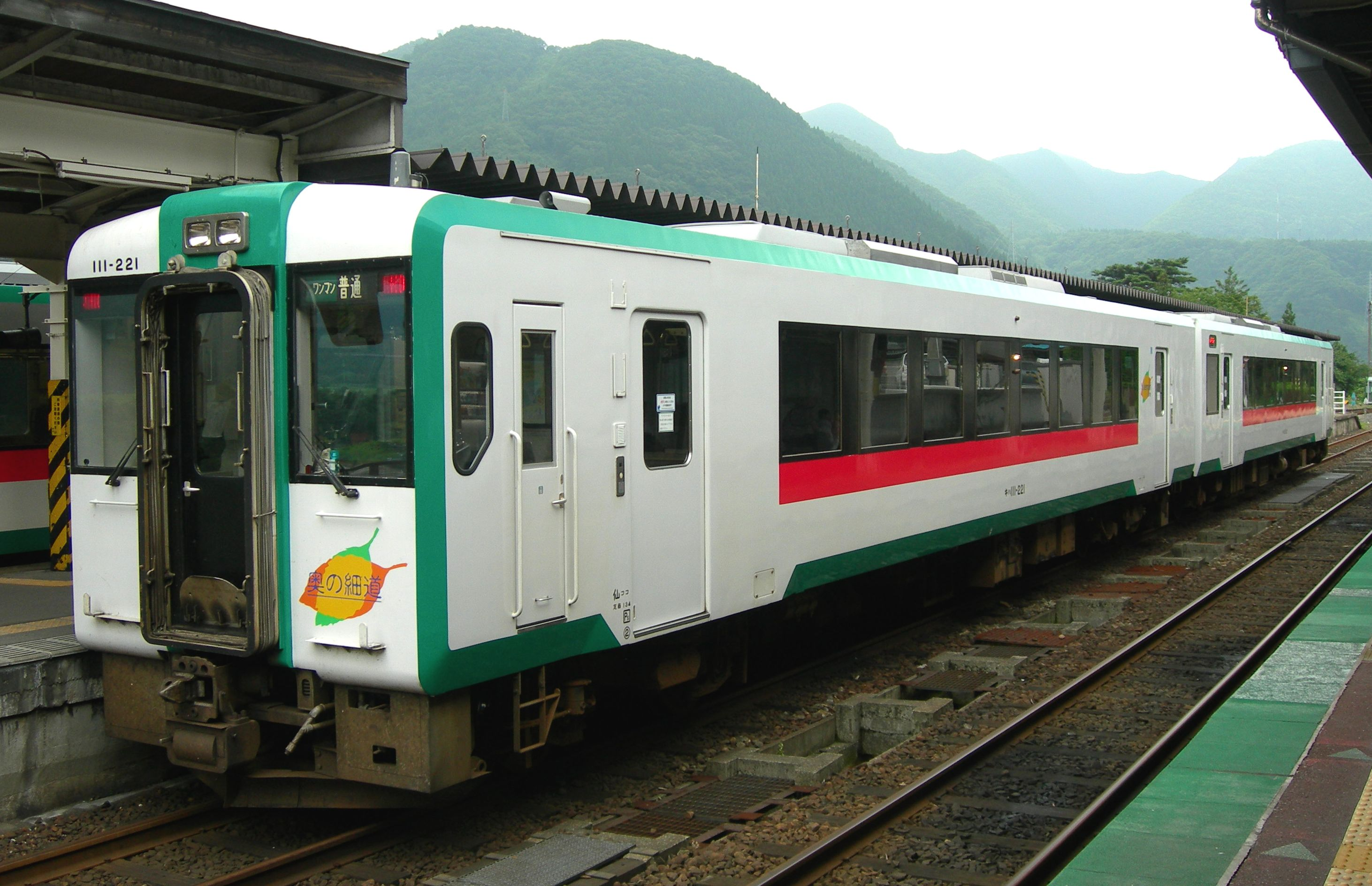
East Rikuu Line 2-car set including car KiHa 111–221 in July 2009

The KiHa 111-200 and 112-200 series comprises 42 two-car units built between 1993 and 1995. The units are 20.5 metres (67 ft) long and have sliding doors. Three cars were converted from the KiHa 111-300 series.

Batch	No.	Built	Manufacturer	Capacity (Total/seated)		Weight		Initial depot
Batch	No.	Built	Manufacturer	KiHa 111	KiHa 112	KiHa 111	KiHa 112	Initial depot
1	111+112‑201–111+112‑203	Oct 1993	Fuji Heavy Industries	135/56	138/62	31.7 t (70,000 lb)	31.2 t (69,000 lb)	Niitsu
2	111+112‑204–111+112‑209	Mar 1996	Fuji Heavy Industries / Niigata Tekkō	135/56	138/62	31.7 t (70,000 lb)	31.2 t (69,000 lb)	Takasaki
3	111+112‑210–111+112‑212	Sep 1995	Nagano Works	131/56	139/62	31.9 t (70,000 lb)	31.4 t (69,000 lb)	Nagano
4	111+112‑213–111+112‑217	Nov 1998	Fuji Heavy Industries / Niigata Tekkō	134/56	139/62	31.7 t (70,000 lb)	31.2 t (69,000 lb)	Kogota
5	111+112‑218–111+112‑221	Nov 1999	Fuji Heavy Industries / Niigata Tekkō	134/56	139/62	31.7 t (70,000 lb)	31.2 t (69,000 lb)	Kogota

As with the KiHa 110-200 subseries, this fleet consists of both newly built and cars converted from KiHa 111/112-300 cars. Cars KiHa 111/112-210 to 213 were converted at JR East's Nagano Works from former Akita Relay cars KiHa 111/112-301 to 303. As with the KiHa 110-200 cars, these cars have sliding doors, solid front-end skirts, and bodies extended to 20.5 m. All cars are equipped with Cummins DMF14HZA engines, and use DT58A motored bogies and TR242 trailer bogies.

=== Interior ===
Interior accommodation consists of a mixture of 2+1 fixed transverse seating bays in the centre of the cars and longitudinal bench seating at the ends of cars. The KiHa 111 cars are fitted with a toilet.

== KiHa 111-300 + KiHa 112-300 ==
The KiHa 111-300 and 112-300 series comprised 3 two-car units built in 1996. The cars were 20.5 metres (67 ft) long. They were used for the Akita Relay, a limited express service that operated until the opening of the Akita Shinkansen. Following the opening, the cars were converted to the KiHa 111-200 and 112-200 specification between June and September 1997.

No.	Built	Manufacturer	Initial depot	Notes
111+112‑301	16 February 1996	Fuji Heavy Industries	Minami-Akita	Converted to 111+112‑210 on 26 June 1997
111+112‑302	17 January 1996	Niigata Tekkō	Minami-Akita	Converted to 111+112‑211 on 30 August 1997
111+112‑303	17 January 1996	Niigata Tekkō	Minami-Akita	Converted to 111+112‑212 on 26 September 1997

=== Interior ===
These cars featured limited express style unidirectional seating arranged 2+2 abreast, with a seat pitch of 950 mm (37 in). The KiHa 111-300 cars included a universal access toilet, and had a seating capacity of 52. The KiHa 112-300 cars had a seating capacity of 56.

== Special units ==
=== KiHa 110-700 Tohoku Emotion ===
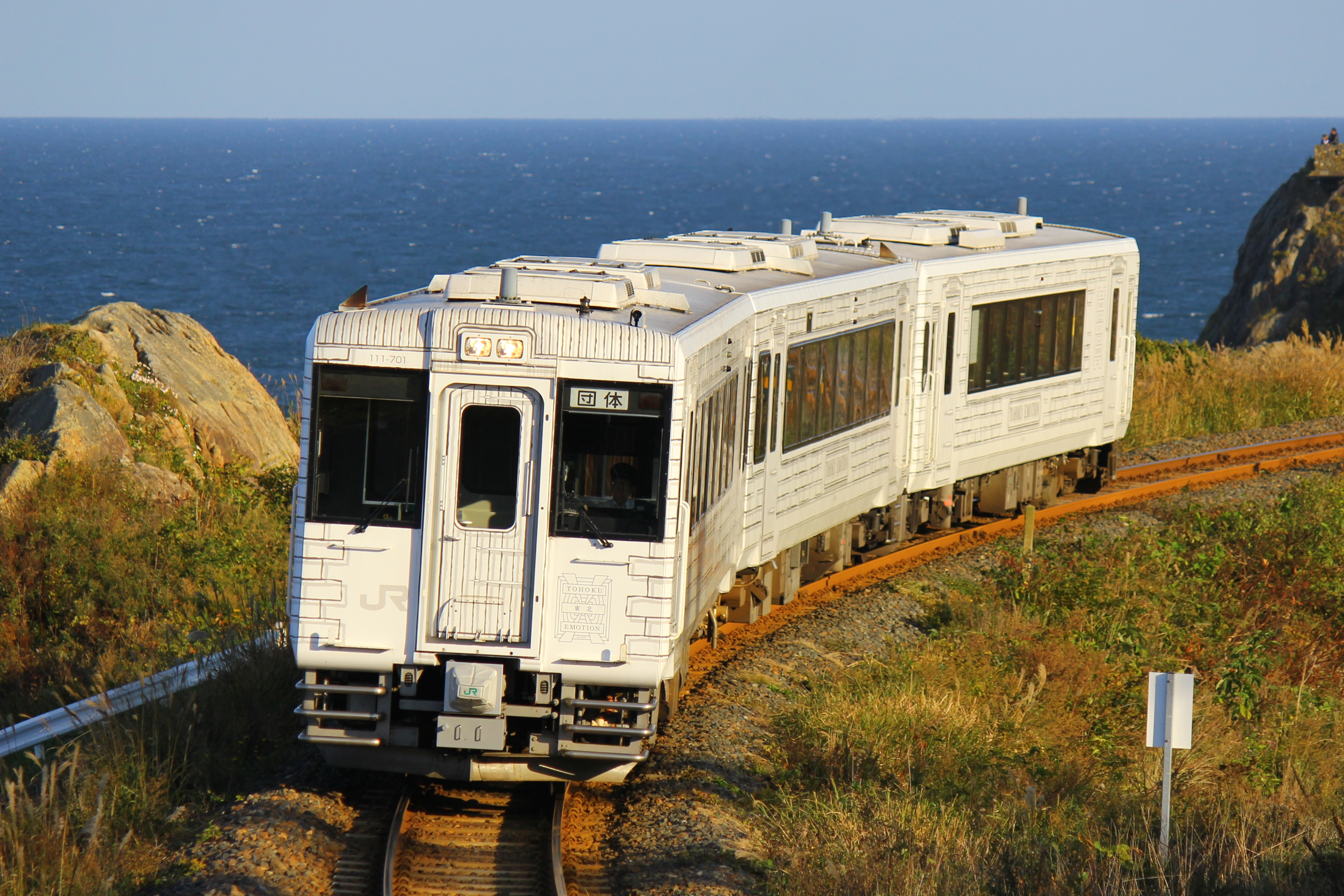
The KiHa 110-700 Tohoku Emotion set in October 2014

One single car and one twin-car set were converted in 2013 at JR East's Koriyama Works to become the Tohoku Emotion restaurant-car Joyful Train set for use in the north-east Tohoku Region of Japan and based at Morioka Depot. Conversion details are as shown below.

Car number	Former number	Conversion date
KiHa 110-701	KiHa 110-105	26 September 2013
KiHa 111-701	KiHa 111-2	26 September 2013
KiKuShi 110-701	KiHa 112-2	26 September 2013

=== High Rail 1375 ===
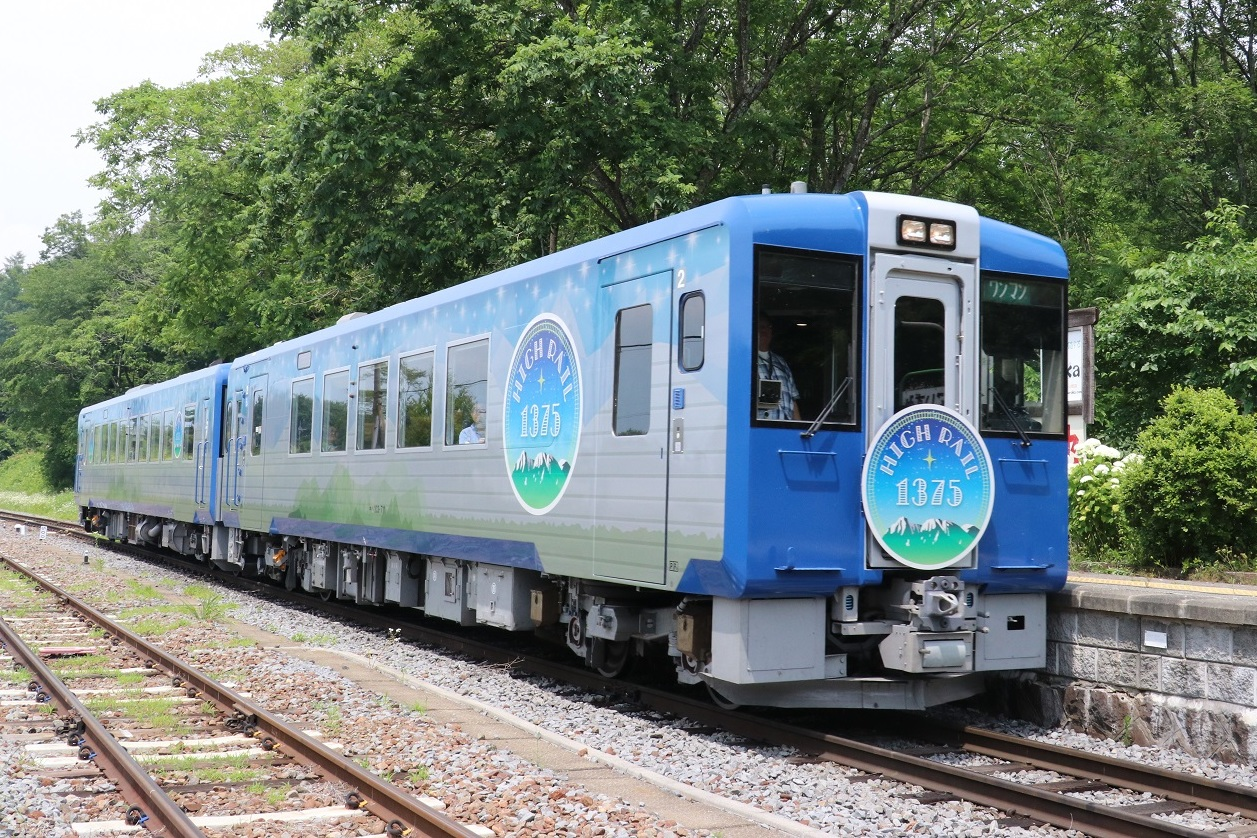
The two-car High Rail 1375 train on the Koumi Line in July 2017

A KiHa 110 and KiHa 100 car were converted in 2017 at JR East's Nagano Works to become the two-car High Rail 1375 trainset for use on sightseeing services on the Koumi Line from 1 July 2017. "1375" refers to the elevation of 1,375 m of the highest point on any JR line in Japan. The new and former car numbers are as shown below.

No.	Car number	Former number
1	KiHa 112-711	KiHa 110-108
2	KiHa 103-711	KiHa 100-29

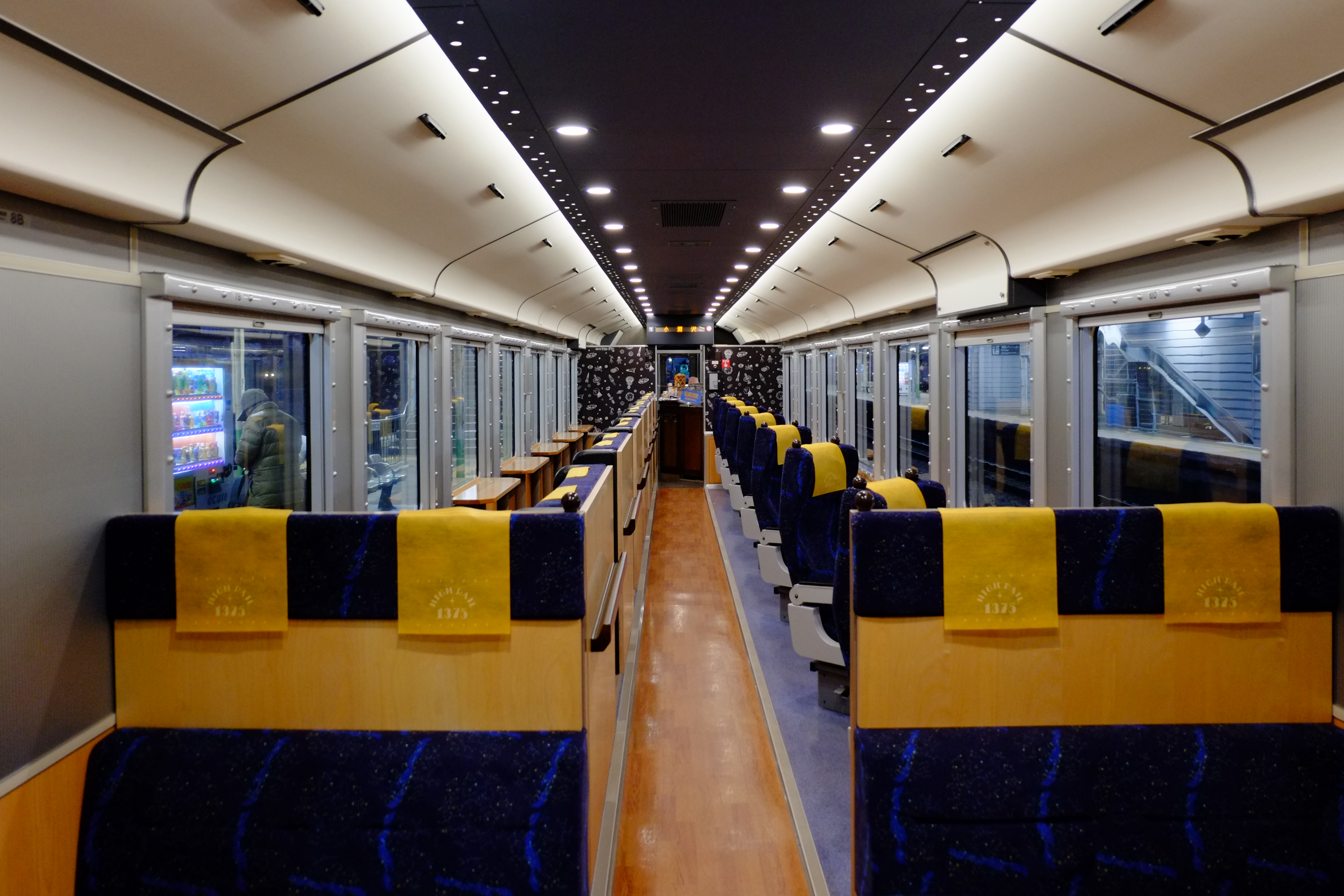
The interior of car 1 (KiHa 112–711) in December 2017

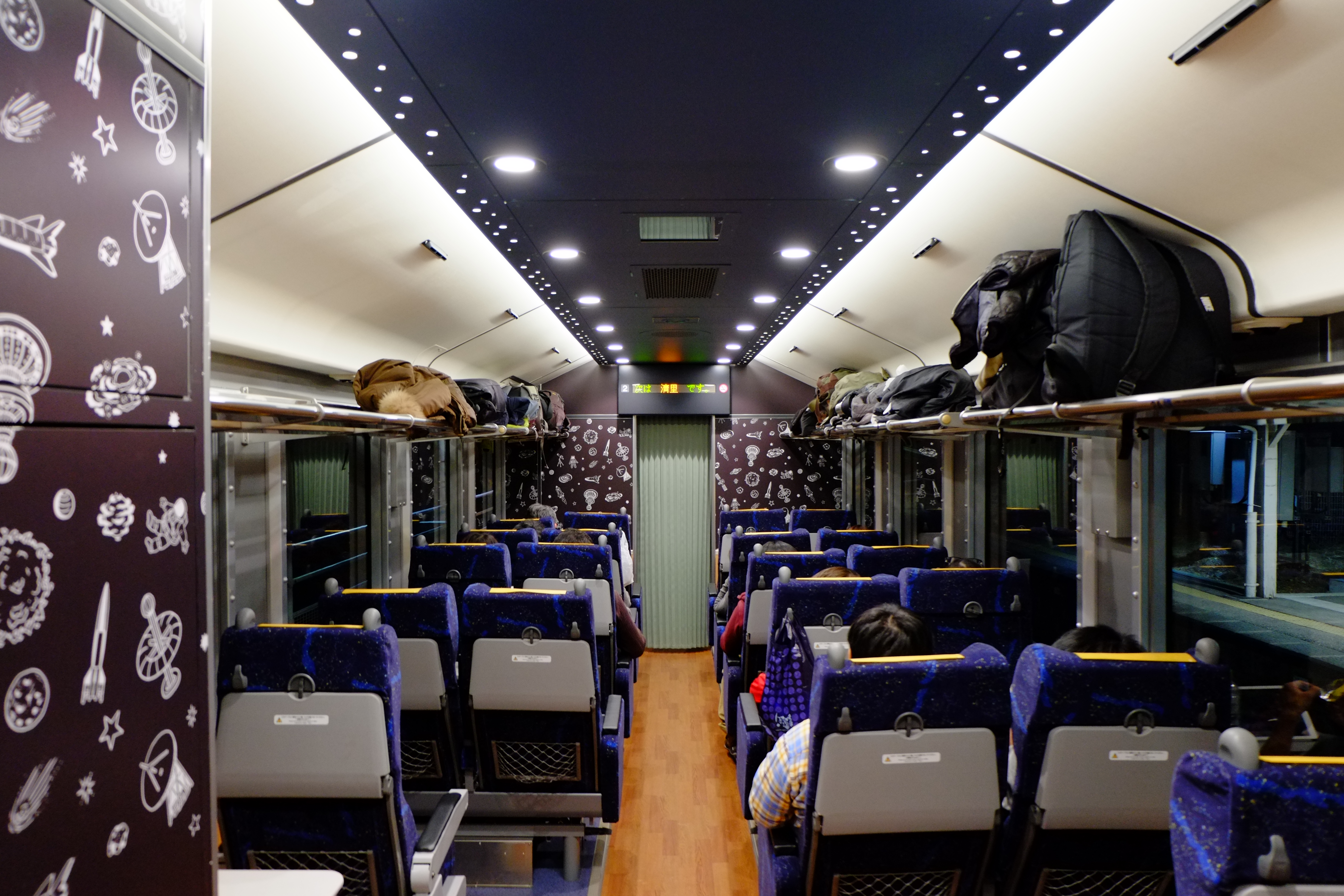
The interior of car 2 (KiHa 103–711) in December 2017

=== Ofunato Line Pokémon With You Train ===
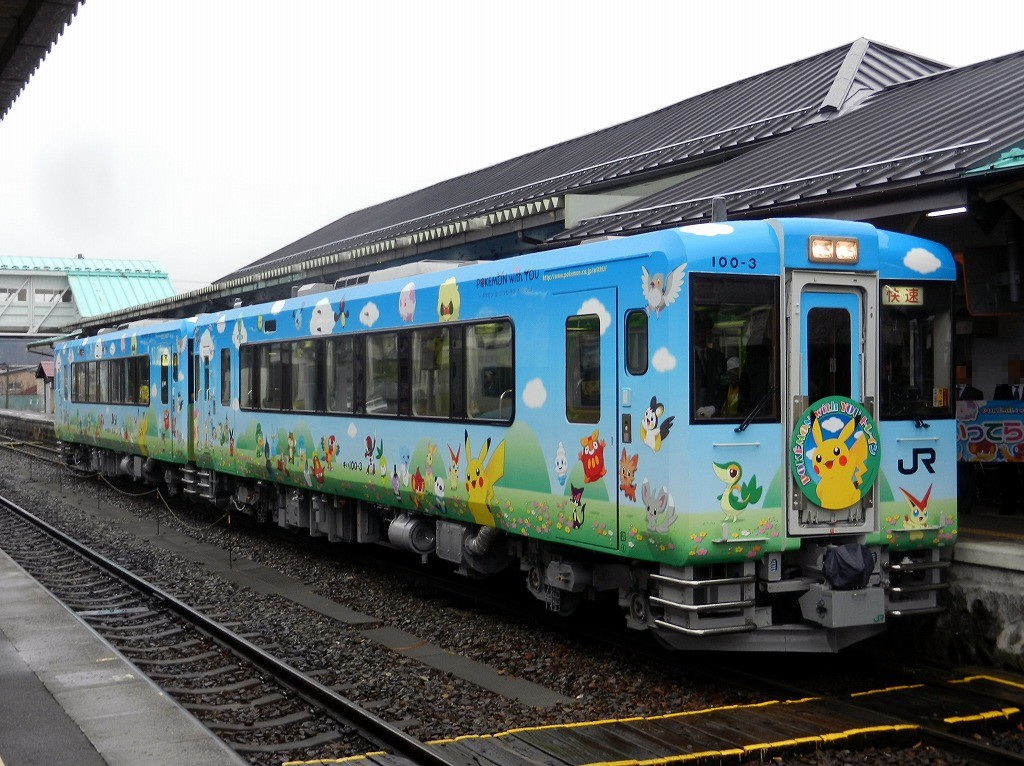
KiHa 100-1 + KiHa 100-3 rebuilt as the "Pokémon With You Train" on the Ofunato Line in December 2012

In December 2012, KiHa 100-1 and KiHa 100-3 were rebuilt as a special Pokémon With You Train for use on the Ofunato Line. The train entered service on 22 December 2012. The two cars underwent further interior refurbishment and repainting into a new yellow livery in 2017.

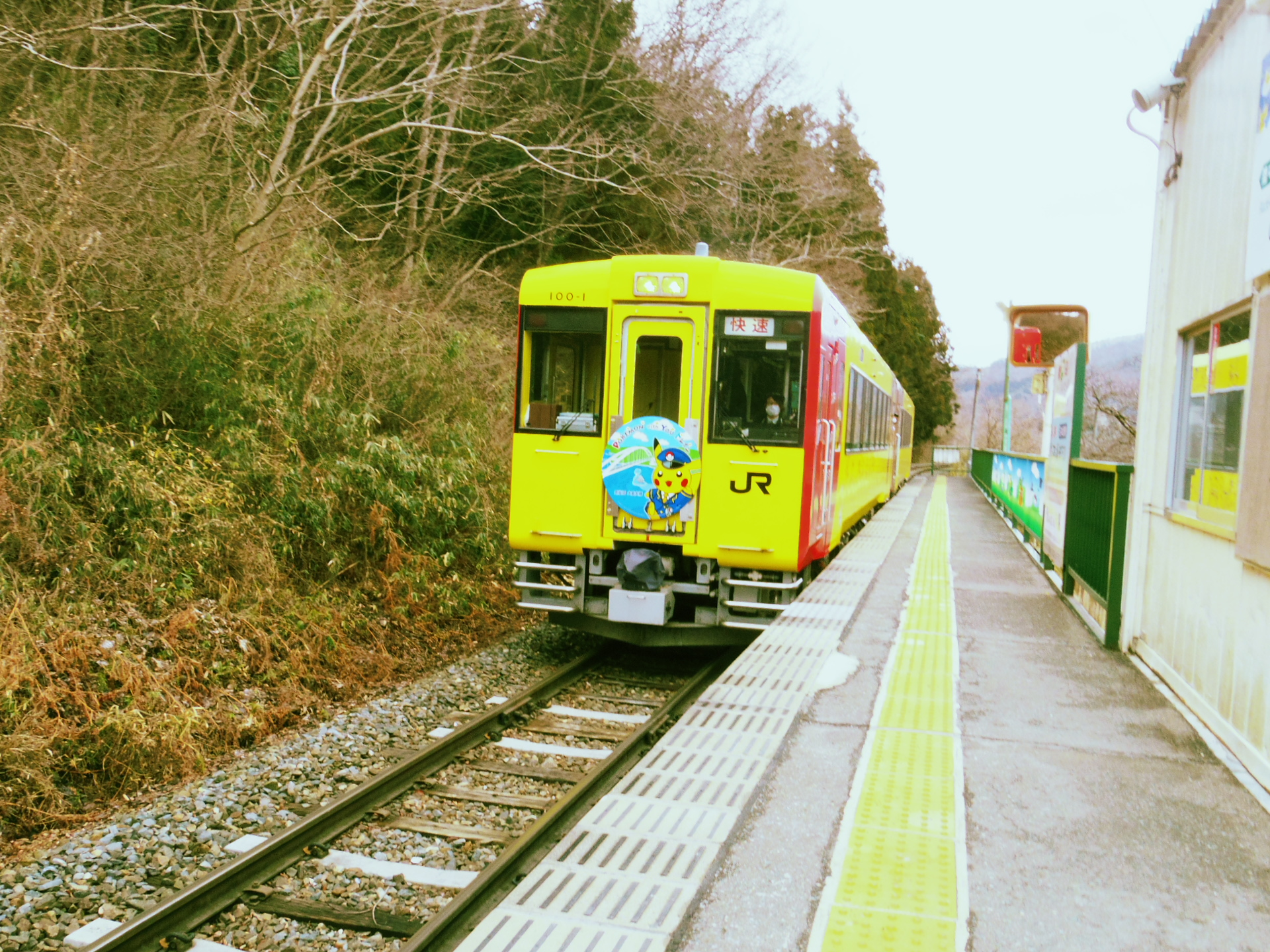
KiHa100-1 Pokémon With You Train in new yellow livery.

=== Hachiko Line 80th anniversary ===
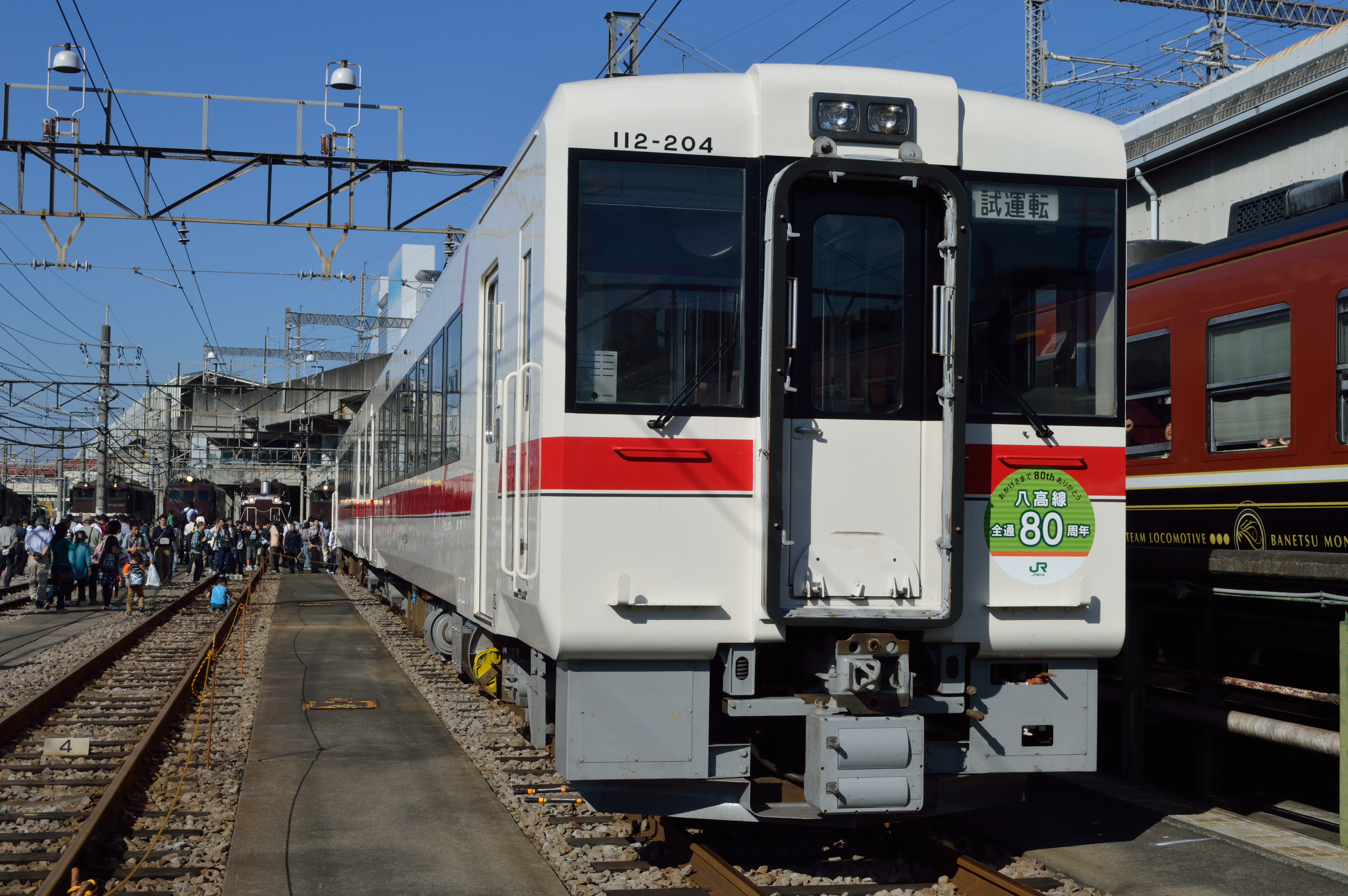
KiHa 111-204 + KiHa 112–204 in special Hachiko Line livery in October 2014

In October 2014, to mark the 80th anniversary of the opening of the Hachiko Line, KiHa 111-204 and KiHa 112-204 were repainted into the cream and red livery carried by the DMUs formerly used on the line.

=== Koumi Line 80th anniversary ===
In February 2015, to mark the 80th anniversary of the opening of the Koumi Line, a single-car KiHa 110 series unit was repainted into the "Metropolitan" all-over red livery carried by KiHa 52 DMUs formerly used on the line. This was followed in March 2015 by a two-car KiHa 110 series unit (KiHa 111-111 + KiHa 112–111) repainted into the vermillion and cream JNR express train livery carried by KiHa 58 series DMUs formerly used on the line.

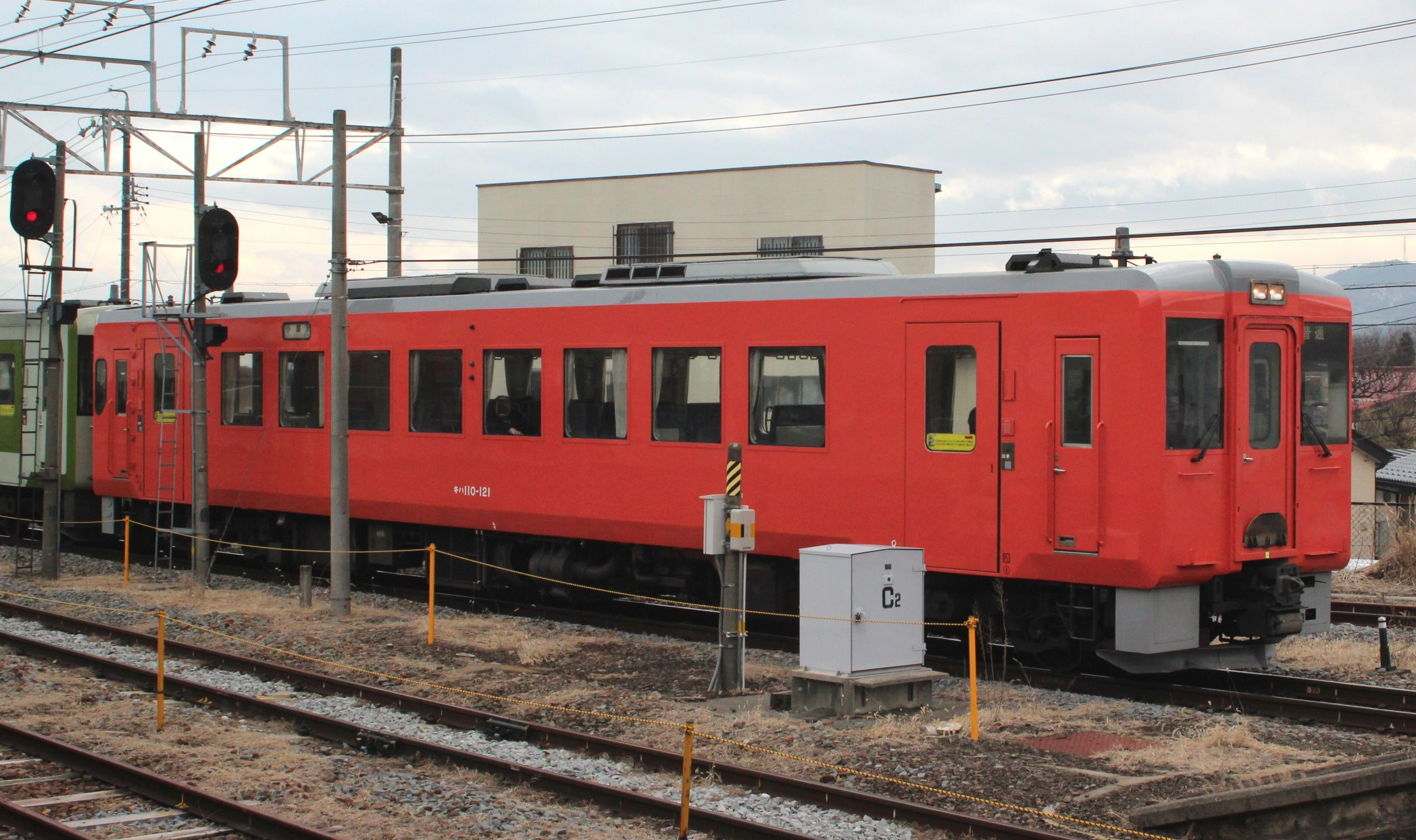
Koumi Line KiHa 110–121 in "Metropolitan" all-over red livery in February 2015

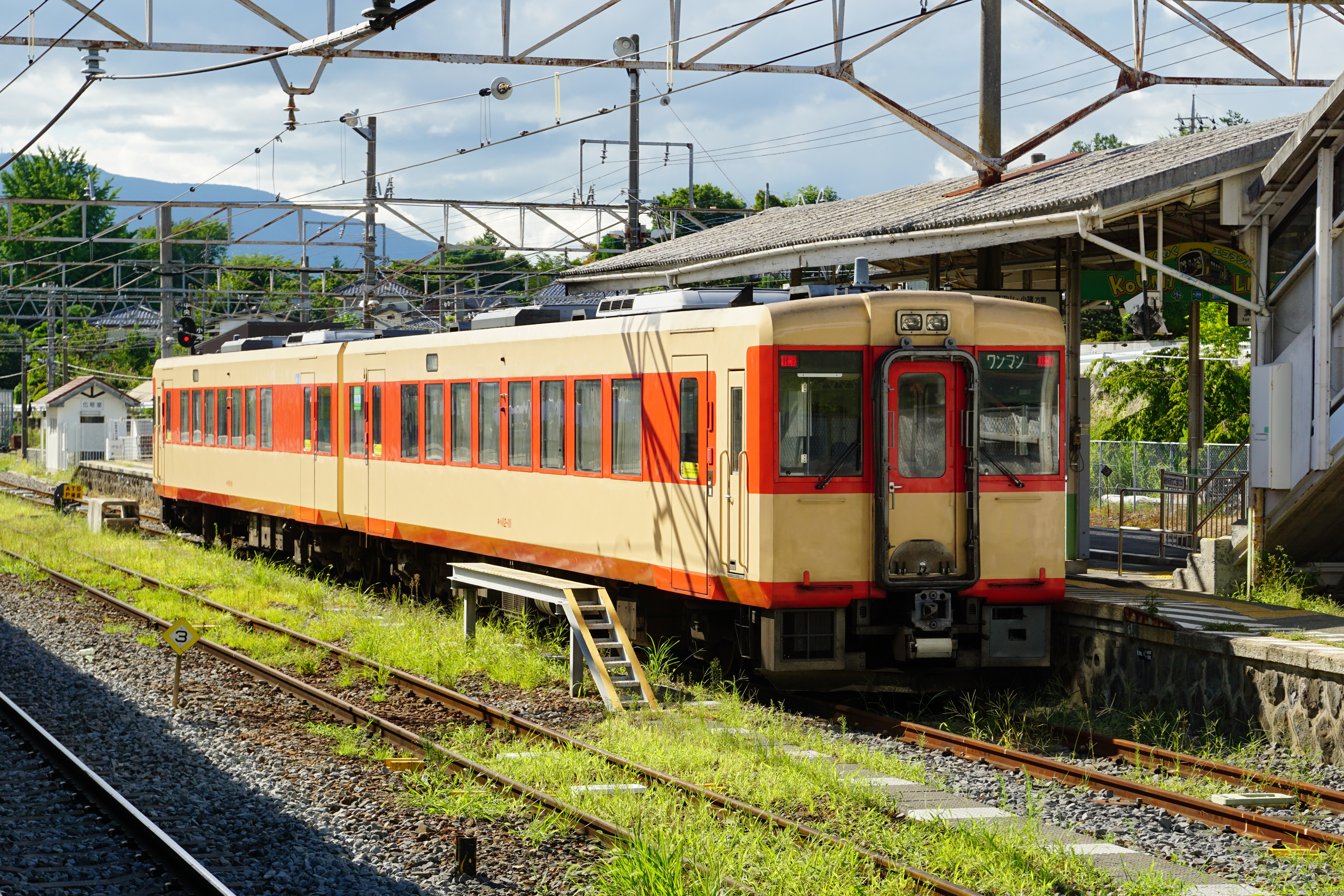
Koumi Line 2-car set KiHa 111-111 + KiHa 112–111 in vermillion and cream JNR express train livery in August 2016

=== Iiyama Line Oykot train ===
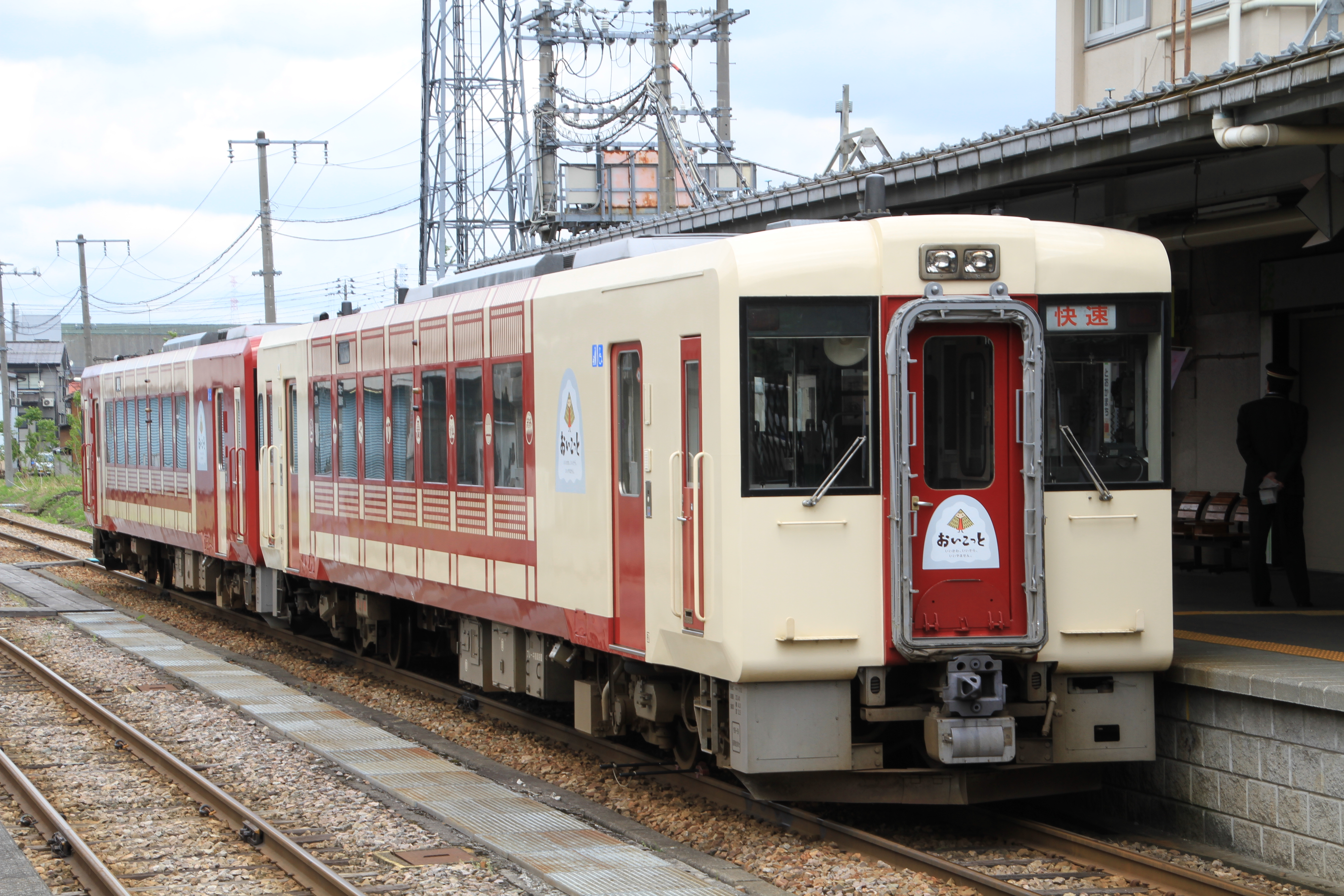
The two-car Oykot train in May 2015 with KiHa 110-235 nearest the camera

Two cars, KiHa 110-235 and KiHa 110–236, were modified and repainted to become a new Oykot (おいこっと) special event train for use on the Iiyama Line. KiHa 110-235 was completed in December 2014, and KiHa 110-236 was completed in 2015 ahead of the official start of Oykot services in April. The name "Oykot" is derived from "Tokyo" spelled backwards.

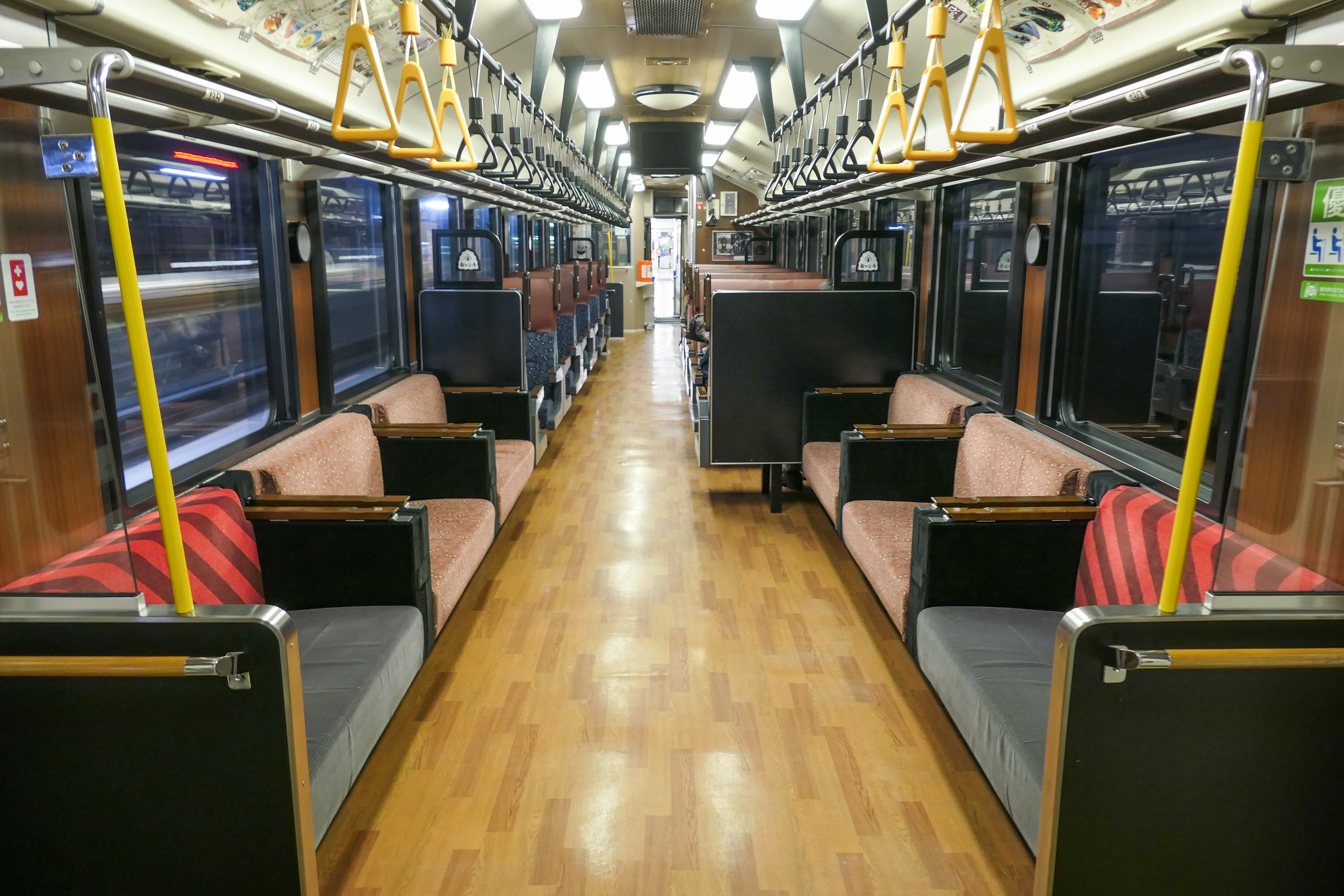
The interior of the Oykot train in February 2022

=== Iiyama Line Voiture Amitié train ===
In March 2017, KiHa 110-231 was repainted into the Voiture Amitié blue and white livery formerly carried by a DMU used on the Iiyama Line between 1991 and 1997.

== Resale ==
On 3 July 2024, Hitachinaka Seaside Railway announced plans to acquire three KiHa 100 series cars from JR East to replace some of its ageing railcars. One of them is scheduled to be converted to a sightseeing train.

Hojo Railway and Yamagata Railway also get KiHa 100 and 110 series.

== Build details ==
The manufacturers and delivery dates for the fleet are as shown below.

Car No.	Manufacturer	Delivered	Withdrawn	Remarks
KiHa 100
100-1	Niigata Tekko	27 January 1990		Pokémon with You Train car 1. Converted in 2012.
100-2	Niigata Tekko	23 February 1990		
100-3	Fuji Heavy Industries	23 February 1990		Pokémon with You Train car 2. Converted in 2012.
100-4	Fuji Heavy Industries	23 February 1990		
100-5	Fuji Heavy Industries	12 March 1991		
100-6	Fuji Heavy Industries	12 March 1991		
100-7	Fuji Heavy Industries	12 March 1991		
100-8	Fuji Heavy Industries	12 March 1991		
100-9	Fuji Heavy Industries	14 June 1991	30 June 2011	
100-10	Fuji Heavy Industries	14 June 1991		
100-11	Fuji Heavy Industries	14 June 1991		
100-12	Fuji Heavy Industries	14 June 1991	30 June 2011	
100-13	Fuji Heavy Industries	5 July 1991		
100-14	Fuji Heavy Industries	5 July 1991		
100-15	Fuji Heavy Industries	5 July 1991		
100-16	Fuji Heavy Industries	5 July 1991		
100-17	Fuji Heavy Industries	5 July 1991		
100-18	Fuji Heavy Industries	5 July 1991		
100-19	Fuji Heavy Industries	26 July 1991		
100-20	Fuji Heavy Industries	26 July 1991		
100-21	Fuji Heavy Industries	26 July 1991		
100-22	Fuji Heavy Industries	26 July 1991		
100-23	Fuji Heavy Industries	26 July 1991		
100-24	Fuji Heavy Industries	26 July 1991		
100-25	Fuji Heavy Industries	2 August 1991		
100-26	Fuji Heavy Industries	2 August 1991		
100-27	Fuji Heavy Industries	2 August 1991		
100-28	Fuji Heavy Industries	2 August 1991		
100-29	Fuji Heavy Industries	2 August 1991	-	Converted to 103-711 (High Rail 1375) in June 2017.
100-30	Niigata Tekko	29 August 1991	30 June 2011	
100-31	Niigata Tekko	29 August 1991		
100-32	Niigata Tekko	29 August 1991		
100-33	Niigata Tekko	29 August 1991		
100-34	Niigata Tekko	29 August 1991		
100-35	Niigata Tekko	14 September 1991		
100-36	Niigata Tekko	14 September 1991		
100-37	Niigata Tekko	14 September 1991		
100-38	Niigata Tekko	14 September 1991	30 June 2011	
100-39	Niigata Tekko	17 October 1991		To be transferred to Hitachinaka Seaside Railway.
100-40	Niigata Tekko	17 October 1991		To be transferred to Hitachinaka Seaside Railway.
100-41	Niigata Tekko	17 October 1991		To be transferred to Hitachinaka Seaside Railway.
100-42	Niigata Tekko	17 October 1991		
100-43	Niigata Tekko	30 October 1991		
100-44	Niigata Tekko	30 October 1991		
100-45	Niigata Tekko	30 October 1991		
100-46	Niigata Tekko	30 October 1991		
100-201	Fuji Heavy Industries	20 September 1993		
100-202	Fuji Heavy Industries	20 September 1993		
100-203	Fuji Heavy Industries	20 September 1993		
100-204	Fuji Heavy Industries	21 September 1993		
100-205	Fuji Heavy Industries	21 September 1993		
KiHa 101
101-1	Niigata Tekko	4 October 1993		
101-2	Niigata Tekko	4 October 1993		
101-3	Niigata Tekko	4 October 1993		
101-4	Niigata Tekko	5 October 1993		
101-5	Niigata Tekko	5 October 1993		
101-6	Niigata Tekko	5 October 1993		
101-7	Niigata Tekko	21 September 1994		
101-8	Niigata Tekko	21 September 1994		
101-9	Niigata Tekko	21 September 1994		
101-10	Niigata Tekko	21 September 1994		
101-11	Niigata Tekko	21 September 1994		
101-12	Niigata Tekko	4 February 1997		
101-13	Niigata Tekko	4 February 1997		
KiHa 103
103-711	Fuji Heavy Industries	2 August 1991		High Rail 1375 car 2, Converted from 100–29 in June 2017.
KiHa 110
110-1	Fuji Heavy Industries	25 January 1990		
110-2	Fuji Heavy Industries	28 February 1990		
110-3	Niigata Tekko	28 February 1990		
110-4	Fuji Heavy Industries	8 March 1991		
110-5	Fuji Heavy Industries	8 March 1991		
110-101	Niigata Tekko	12 February 1991		
110-102	Niigata Tekko	12 February 1991		
110-103	Niigata Tekko	12 February 1991		
110-104	Niigata Tekko	12 February 1991		
110-105	Fuji Heavy Industries	21 June 1991	-	Converted to 110-701 (Tohoku Emotion) in September 2014.
110-106	Fuji Heavy Industries	21 June 1991		
110-107	Fuji Heavy Industries	12 July 1991		
110-108	Fuji Heavy Industries	12 July 1991	-	Converted to 112-711 (High Rail 1375) in June 2017.
110-109	Fuji Heavy Industries	12 July 1991		
110-110	Fuji Heavy Industries	12 July 1991		
110-111	Fuji Heavy Industries	19 July 1991		
110-112	Fuji Heavy Industries	19 July 1991		
110-113	Fuji Heavy Industries	19 July 1991		
110-114	Fuji Heavy Industries	19 July 1991		
110-115	Fuji Heavy Industries	19 August 1991		
110-116	Fuji Heavy Industries	19 August 1991		
110-117	Fuji Heavy Industries	19 August 1991		
110-118	Fuji Heavy Industries	19 August 1991		
110-119	Fuji Heavy Industries	26 August 1991		
110-120	Fuji Heavy Industries	26 August 1991		
110-121	Fuji Heavy Industries	26 August 1991		
110-122	Fuji Heavy Industries	26 August 1991		
110-123	Niigata Tekko	25 September 1991		
110-124	Niigata Tekko	25 September 1991		
110-125	Niigata Tekko	25 September 1991		
110-126	Niigata Tekko	25 September 1991		
110-127	Niigata Tekko	25 September 1991		
110-128	Niigata Tekko	25 September 1991		
110-129	Fuji Heavy Industries	25 December 1991		
110-130	Fuji Heavy Industries	25 December 1991		
110-131	Fuji Heavy Industries	25 December 1991		
110-132	Fuji Heavy Industries	25 December 1991	2 May 2017	
110-133	Fuji Heavy Industries	21 January 1992		
110-134	Fuji Heavy Industries	21 January 1992		
110-135	Fuji Heavy Industries	21 January 1992		
110-136	Fuji Heavy Industries	21 January 1992		
110-137	Fuji Heavy Industries	21 January 1992		
110-138	Fuji Heavy Industries	21 January 1992		
110-139	Fuji Heavy Industries	21 January 1992		
110-201	Niigata Tekko	9 February 1993		
110-202	Niigata Tekko	9 February 1993		
110-203	Niigata Tekko	9 February 1993		
110-204	Fuji Heavy Industries	5 February 1993		
110-205	Fuji Heavy Industries	5 February 1993		
110-206	Fuji Heavy Industries	5 February 1993		
110-207	Niigata Tekko	8 February 1993		
110-208	Niigata Tekko	8 February 1993		
110-209	Fuji Heavy Industries	4 February 1993		
110-210	Fuji Heavy Industries	4 February 1993		
110-211	Niigata Tekko	14 September 1993		
110-212	Niigata Tekko	14 September 1993		
110-213	Niigata Tekko	14 September 1993		
110-214	Niigata Tekko	14 September 1993		
110-215	Niigata Tekko	13 October 1993		
110-216	Niigata Tekko	13 October 1993		
110-217	Niigata Tekko	13 October 1993		
110-218	Fuji Heavy Industries	22 September 1993		
110-219	Fuji Heavy Industries	22 September 1993		
110-220	Fuji Heavy Industries	22 September 1993		
110-221	Niigata Tekko	6 February 1996		
110-222	Fuji Heavy Industries	6 February 1996		
110-223	Fuji Heavy Industries	18 December 1995		Converted from 110–301 in November 1997.
110-224	Fuji Heavy Industries	18 December 1995		Converted from 110–302 in December 1997.
110-225	Fuji Heavy Industries	18 December 1995		Converted from 110–303 in May 1997.
110-226	Fuji Heavy Industries	25 December 1995		Converted from 110–304 in May 1997.
110-227	Fuji Heavy Industries	25 December 1995		Converted from 110–305 in May 1997.
110-228	Fuji Heavy Industries	25 December 1995		Converted from 110–306 in June 1997.
110-229	Fuji Heavy Industries	16 February 1996		Converted from 110–307 in July 1997.
110-230	Fuji Heavy Industries	16 February 1996		Converted from 110–308 in July 1997.
110-231	Niigata Tekko	15 February 1996		Converted from 110–309 in July 1997.
110-232	Niigata Tekko	15 February 1996		Converted from 110–310 in August 1997.
110-233	Niigata Tekko	15 February 1996		Converted from 110–311 in August 1997.
110-234	Niigata Tekko	16 February 1996		Converted from 110–312 in October 1997.
110-235	Niigata Tekko	16 February 1996		Converted from 110–313 in August 1997. Oykot (converted in 2014)
110-236	Niigata Tekko	16 February 1996		Converted from 110–314 in August 1997. Oykot (converted in 2014)
110-301	Fuji Heavy Industries	18 December 1995	-	Converted to 110–223 in November 1997.
110-302	Fuji Heavy Industries	18 December 1995	-	Converted to 110–224 in December 1997.
110-303	Fuji Heavy Industries	18 December 1995	-	Converted to 110–225 in May 1997.
110-304	Fuji Heavy Industries	25 December 1995	-	Converted to 110–226 in May 1997.
110-305	Fuji Heavy Industries	25 December 1995	-	Converted to 110–227 in May 1997.
110-306	Fuji Heavy Industries	25 December 1995	-	Converted to 110–228 in June 1997.
110-307	Fuji Heavy Industries	16 February 1996	-	Converted to 110–229 in July 1997.
110-308	Fuji Heavy Industries	16 February 1996	-	Converted to 110–230 in July 1997.
110-309	Niigata Tekko	15 February 1996	-	Converted to 110–231 in July 1997.
110-310	Niigata Tekko	15 February 1996	-	Converted to 110–232 in August 1997.
110-311	Niigata Tekko	15 February 1996	-	Converted to 110–233 in August 1997.
110-312	Niigata Tekko	16 February 1996	-	Converted to 110–234 in October 1997.
110-313	Niigata Tekko	16 February 1996	-	Converted to 110–235 in August 1997.
110-314	Niigata Tekko	16 February 1996	-	Converted to 110–236 in August 1997.
110-701	Fuji Heavy Industries	21 June 1991		Tohoku Emotion car 3. Converted from 110–105 in September 2014.
KiHa 111
111-1	Niigata Tekko	30 March 1991		
111-2	Niigata Tekko	30 March 1991	-	Converted to 111-701 (Tohoku Emotion) in September 2014.
111-3	Niigata Tekko	30 March 1991		
111-101	Niigata Tekko	12 February 1991		
111-102	Niigata Tekko	4 March 1991		
111-103	Niigata Tekko	4 March 1991		
111-104	Niigata Tekko	4 March 1991		
111-105	Niigata Tekko	12 March 1991		
111-106	Niigata Tekko	12 March 1991		
111-107	Niigata Tekko	12 March 1991		
111-108	Niigata Tekko	14 March 1991		
111-109	Niigata Tekko	18 December 1991		
111-110	Niigata Tekko	18 December 1991		
111-111	Niigata Tekko	18 December 1991		
111-112	Fuji Heavy Industries	15 February 1992		
111-113	Fuji Heavy Industries	15 February 1992		
111-114	Fuji Heavy Industries	22 February 1992		
111-115	Fuji Heavy Industries	22 February 1992		
111-116	Fuji Heavy Industries	22 February 1992		
111-117	Fuji Heavy Industries	22 February 1992		
111-118	Fuji Heavy Industries	22 February 1992		
111-119	Fuji Heavy Industries	22 February 1992		
111-120	Fuji Heavy Industries	22 February 1992		
111-121	Fuji Heavy Industries	22 February 1992		
111-151	Fuji Heavy Industries	27 September 1994		
111-152	Fuji Heavy Industries	27 September 1994		
111-201	Fuji Heavy Industries	13 October 1993		
111-202	Fuji Heavy Industries	13 October 1993		
111-203	Fuji Heavy Industries	13 October 1993		
111-204	Niigata Tekko	12 December 1995		
111-205	Niigata Tekko	12 December 1995		
111-206	Niigata Tekko	6 February 1996		
111-207	Fuji Heavy Industries	4 March 1996		
111-208	Fuji Heavy Industries	4 March 1996		
111-209	Fuji Heavy Industries	4 March 1996		
111-210	Fuji Heavy Industries	16 February 1996		Converted from 111–301 in June 1997.
111-211	Niigata Tekko	17 January 1996		Converted from 111–302 in August 1997.
111-212	Niigata Tekko	17 January 1996		Converted from 111–303 in September 1997.
111-213	Fuji Heavy Industries	20 October 1998		
111-214	Fuji Heavy Industries	20 October 1998		
111-215	Fuji Heavy Industries	20 October 1998		
111-216	Niigata Tekko	10 November 1998		
111-217	Niigata Tekko	10 November 1998		
111-218	Fuji Heavy Industries	25 October 1999		
111-219	Fuji Heavy Industries	25 October 1999		
111-220	Niigata Tekko	11 November 1999		
111-221	Fuji Heavy Industries	26 October 1999		
111-301	Fuji Heavy Industries	16 February 1996	-	Converted to 111–210 in June 1997.
111-302	Niigata Tekko	17 January 1996	-	Converted to 111–211 in August 1997.
111-303	Niigata Tekko	17 January 1996	-	Converted to 111–212 in September 1997.
111-701	Niigata Tekko	30 March 1991		Tohoku Emotion car 1. Converted from 111–2 in September 2014.
KiHa 112
112-1	Niigata Tekko	30 March 1991		
112-2	Niigata Tekko	30 March 1991	-	Converted to KiKuShi 112-701 (Tohoku Emotion) in September 2014.
112-3	Niigata Tekko	30 March 1991		
112-101	Niigata Tekko	12 February 1991		
112-102	Niigata Tekko	4 March 1991		
112-103	Niigata Tekko	4 March 1991		
112-104	Niigata Tekko	4 March 1991		
112-105	Niigata Tekko	12 March 1991		
112-106	Niigata Tekko	12 March 1991		
112-107	Niigata Tekko	12 March 1991		
112-108	Niigata Tekko	14 March 1991		
112-109	Niigata Tekko	18 December 1991		
112-110	Niigata Tekko	18 December 1991		
112-111	Niigata Tekko	18 December 1991		
112-112	Fuji Heavy Industries	15 February 1992		
112-113	Fuji Heavy Industries	15 February 1992		
112-114	Fuji Heavy Industries	22 February 1992		
112-115	Fuji Heavy Industries	22 February 1992		
112-116	Fuji Heavy Industries	22 February 1992		
112-117	Fuji Heavy Industries	27 February 1992		
112-118	Fuji Heavy Industries	27 February 1992		
112-119	Fuji Heavy Industries	27 February 1992		
112-120	Fuji Heavy Industries	27 February 1992		
112-121	Fuji Heavy Industries	27 February 1992		
112-151	Fuji Heavy Industries	27 September 1994		
112-152	Fuji Heavy Industries	27 September 1994		
112-201	Fuji Heavy Industries	13 October 1993		
112-202	Fuji Heavy Industries	13 October 1993		
112-203	Fuji Heavy Industries	13 October 1993		
112-204	Niigata Tekko	12 December 1995		
112-205	Niigata Tekko	12 December 1995		
112-206	Niigata Tekko	6 February 1996		
112-207	Fuji Heavy Industries	4 March 1996		
112-208	Fuji Heavy Industries	4 March 1996		
112-209	Fuji Heavy Industries	4 March 1996		
112-210	Fuji Heavy Industries	16 February 1996		Converted from 112–301 in June 1997.
112-211	Niigata Tekko	17 January 1996		Converted from 112–302 in August 1997.
112-212	Niigata Tekko	17 January 1996		Converted from 112–303 in September 1997.
112-213	Fuji Heavy Industries	20 October 1998		
112-214	Fuji Heavy Industries	20 October 1998		
112-215	Fuji Heavy Industries	20 October 1998		
112-216	Niigata Tekko	10 November 1998		
112-217	Niigata Tekko	10 November 1998		
112-218	Fuji Heavy Industries	25 October 1999		
112-219	Fuji Heavy Industries	25 October 1999		
112-220	Niigata Tekko	11 November 1999		
112-221	Fuji Heavy Industries	26 October 1999		
112-301	Fuji Heavy Industries	16 February 1996	-	Converted to 112–210 in June 1997.
112-302	Niigata Tekko	17 January 1996	-	Converted to 112–211 in August 1997.
112-303	Niigata Tekko	17 January 1996	-	Converted to 112–212 in September 1997.
112-711	Fuji Heavy Industries	12 July 1991		High Rail 1375 car 1. Converted from 110–108 in June 2017.
KiKuShi 112-701	Niigata Tekko	30 March 1991		Tohoku Emotion car 2. Converted from 112–2 in September 2014.
