= 羽州 =

羽州 may refer to:

- Dewa Province, all abbreviated name was following Ushū (羽州)
  - Ugo Province, province of Japan located in what is today Akita Prefecture and some parts of Yamagata Prefecture
  - Uzen Province, province of Japan located in what is today Yamagata Prefecture
- Ushū Kaidō (羽州街道), subroute of the Ōshū Kaidō and the Sendaidō in Japan
