= Akita (city) =

Akita 秋田市
- Prefecture capital and Core city
- Akita City
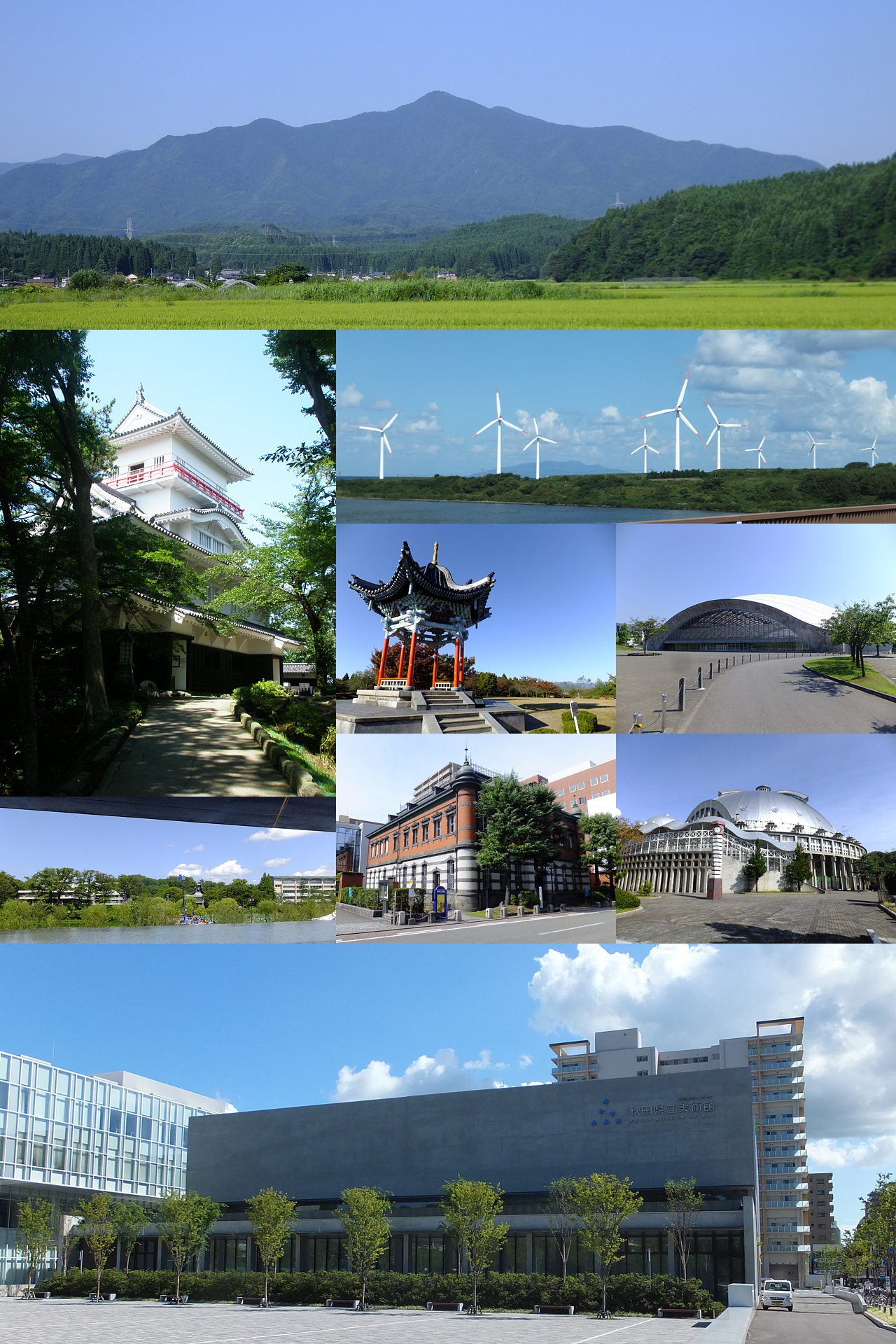
- From the top, left to right: Mount Taihei, Kubota Castle, Akita-Araya Wind Farm, Hitotsumori Park, Akita Skydome, Akita Museum of Art, Akita Akarengakan Museum, Akita City Gymnasium

- Flag Seal
- Interactive map of Akita
- Location within Japan
- Coordinates: 39°43′12.1″N 140°6′9.3″E
- Country: Japan
- Region: Tōhoku
- Prefecture: Akita
- First official recorded: 659 AD
- City Settled: April 1, 1889

Government
  - Mayor: Jun Numaya (since April 2025)

Area
  - Total: 906.07 km^{2} (349.84 sq mi)

Population (August 1, 2023)
  - Total: 300,502
  - Density: 331.65/km^{2} (858.98/sq mi)
- Time zone: UTC+9 (Japan Standard Time)
- Phone number: 018-863-2222
- Address: 1-1 Sanno 1-chome, Akita-shi 010-8560
- Climate: Cfa
- Website: Official website
- Symbols
- Flower: Satsuki azalea
- Tree: Zelkova serrata

Akita (秋田市, Akita-shi; Japanese pronunciation: [ä́.k̟ʲi̥.tä̀, ä̀.k̟ʲi̥.tä́.ɕì]) is the capital and most populous city of Akita Prefecture, Japan, and has been designated a core city since 1 April 1997. As of 1 August 2023, the city has an estimated population of 300,502 persons in 136,628 households and a population density of 332 persons per km^{2}. The total area of the city is 906.07 square kilometres (349.84 sq mi).

== History ==
The area of present-day Akita was part of ancient Dewa Province, and has been inhabited for thousands of years. The Jizōden ruins within the city limits are a major archaeological site with artifacts from the Japanese Paleolithic period through the Jōmon and Yayoi periods. During the Nara period, the imperial court established Akita Castle in 733 AD to bring the local Emishi tribes under its control. The area was ruled by a succession of local samurai clans in the Sengoku period, before coming under the control of the Satake clan of Kubota Domain during the Edo period. Under the Tokugawa shogunate, a castle town developed around Kubota Castle.

=== Meiji and Taishō Eras ===
With the start of the Meiji period, Kubota Domain was abolished, and its castle town divided into the towns of Akita and Kubota. Akita Prefecture was established in 1871, and Shima Yoshitake was named the first governor. Ancient Akita District was divided into Kitaakita and Minamiakita Districts in 1878. Most of Akita town burned down in a great fire on 30 April 1886.

With the establishment of the modern municipalities system on 1 April 1889, the city of Akita was officially established, including former Kubota and Akita towns. The port area was separated into Tsuchizaki-Minato Town, which became part of Minamiakita District. The first city hall was located inside the former Minamiakita District office. In September 1898, the Imperial Japanese Army's 17th Infantry Regiment was based in Akita. The first public library was opened in 1898, electrification of Tsuchizaki began in 1901, and Akita Station was opened in 1902, as well as running water and telephone services in 1907.

The Taishō period brought further development to Akita with Nippon Oil Corporation developing the nearby Kurokawa Oil Fields in 1914, and a branch of the Bank of Japan opening in Akita in 1917.

=== Shōwa Era ===
In 1935, Nippon Kogyo (the forerunner of Jomo) began development of the nearby Yabase Oil Fields. Akita Bank was established in 1941.

War devastated the city on 14 August 1945. During the Tsuchizaki air raid, over 250 people were killed when 134 USAAF B-29 Superfortress, attacked the city from midnight to the early dawn. A Nippon Oil oil refinery in the Tsuchizaki area was targeted.

During the post-war period, the 16th National Sports Festival of Japan was held in Akita in 1961. During the tsunami following the 1983 Sea of Japan earthquake, three Akita residents were killed.

=== Heisei Era ===
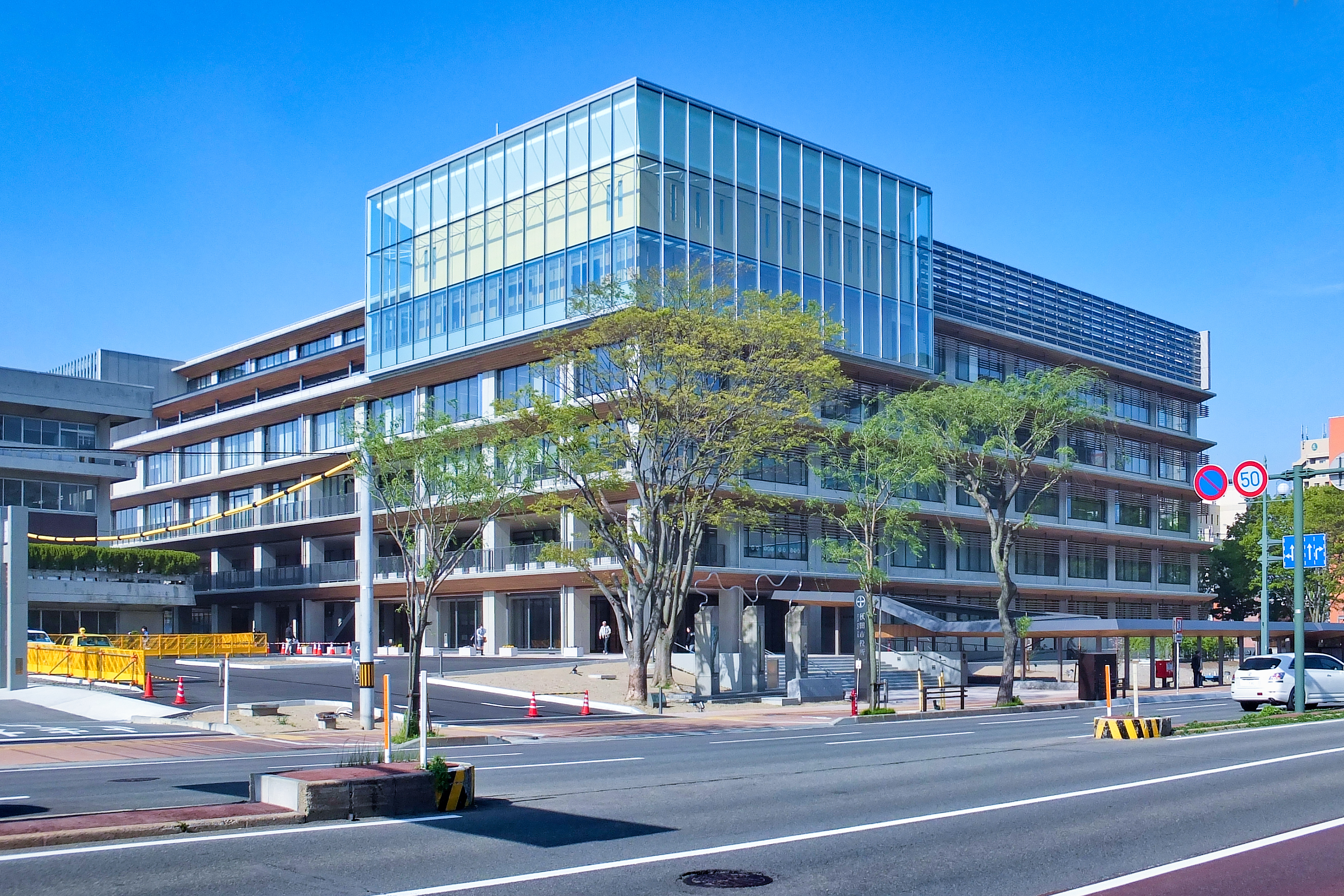
Akita City Hall

On 1 April 1997, Akita was designated as a core city with increased autonomy. The Akita Shinkansen began operations the same year. In August 2001, the World Games were held in Akita, with the opening ceremony held in the Yabase Track and Field Stadium. In 2004, the city celebrated its 400th anniversary and its beginnings as Kubota Castle town.

On 11 January 2005, the towns of Kawabe and Yūwa (both from Kawabe District) were merged into Akita. Kawabe District was dissolved as a result of this merger. The location of Akita City Hall did not change, and former Kawabe and Yūwa Town Halls are used as civic centers. The 62nd National Sports Festival of Japan was held in Akita in 2007.

== Geography ==
The city of Akita is located in the coastal plains of central Akita Prefecture, bordered by the Sea of Japan to the west. The Omono River runs through the center of the city.

=== Neighboring municipalities ===
- Akita Prefecture
  - Kitaakita
  - Katagami
  - Yurihonjō
  - Daisen
  - Senboku
  - Minamiakita District: Gojōme, Ikawa
  - Kitaakita District: Kamikoani

=== Demography ===
Censuses have been conducted in Akita since as early as 1873. Per Japanese census data since 1950, the population of Akita peaked in around the year 2000 and has been in decline since then.

Historical population
Year	Pop.	±%
1873	38,118	—
1950	200,525	+426.1%
1960	229,933	+14.7%
1970	257,532	+12.0%
1980	304,823	+18.4%
1990	322,698	+5.9%
2000	336,646	+4.3%
2010	323,363	−3.9%
2020	305,625	−5.5%

== Climate ==
Akita belongs to a climatic transition zone humid subtropical climate (Köppen Cfa) and is the most populous city having absolute northern extremity of this climate zone within Japan, bordering very closely with the humid continental climate (Köppen Dfa) zone, comparable to New York City, USA. Akita is characterized with cold, very snowy, winters, and hot, humid summers. Monthly averages range from 0.4 °C (32.7 °F) in January to 25.0 °C (77.0 °F) in August. Due to its location near the Sea of Japan coast, it receives heavy snowfall, with just above 377 centimetres (148 in) per season, with accumulation occurring mostly from December to March. Precipitation is well-distributed and significant throughout the year, but is greater in the latter half. Over two thirds of all days see some precipitation, either rain or snow.

Climate data for Akita (elevation 6.3 m, 1991–2020 normals, extremes 1882–present)
Month	Jan	Feb	Mar	Apr	May	Jun	Jul	Aug	Sep	Oct	Nov	Dec	Year
Record high °C (°F)	13.7 (56.7)	20.1 (68.2)	22.8 (73.0)	28.3 (82.9)	31.8 (89.2)	33.8 (92.8)	37.9 (100.2)	38.5 (101.3)	36.1 (97.0)	30.1 (86.2)	25.2 (77.4)	21.4 (70.5)	38.5 (101.3)
Mean maximum °C (°F)	8.8 (47.8)	10.8 (51.4)	16.1 (61.0)	22.8 (73.0)	28.1 (82.6)	30.3 (86.5)	33.1 (91.6)	34.5 (94.1)	31.8 (89.2)	25.1 (77.2)	19.2 (66.6)	13.0 (55.4)	35.1 (95.2)
Mean daily maximum °C (°F)	3.1 (37.6)	4.0 (39.2)	7.9 (46.2)	14.0 (57.2)	19.6 (67.3)	23.7 (74.7)	27.1 (80.8)	29.2 (84.6)	25.4 (77.7)	19.0 (66.2)	12.2 (54.0)	5.9 (42.6)	15.9 (60.6)
Daily mean °C (°F)	0.4 (32.7)	0.8 (33.4)	4.0 (39.2)	9.6 (49.3)	15.2 (59.4)	19.6 (67.3)	23.4 (74.1)	25.0 (77.0)	21.0 (69.8)	14.5 (58.1)	8.3 (46.9)	2.8 (37.0)	12.1 (53.8)
Mean daily minimum °C (°F)	−2.1 (28.2)	−2.1 (28.2)	0.4 (32.7)	5.2 (41.4)	11.1 (52.0)	16.0 (60.8)	20.4 (68.7)	21.6 (70.9)	17.1 (62.8)	10.4 (50.7)	4.5 (40.1)	0.0 (32.0)	8.5 (47.3)
Mean minimum °C (°F)	−6.3 (20.7)	−6.3 (20.7)	−3.8 (25.2)	−0.4 (31.3)	5.4 (41.7)	11.2 (52.2)	16.0 (60.8)	16.6 (61.9)	10.8 (51.4)	4.6 (40.3)	−0.5 (31.1)	−4.3 (24.3)	−7.1 (19.2)
Record low °C (°F)	−19.8 (−3.6)	−24.6 (−12.3)	−19.5 (−3.1)	−7.2 (19.0)	−1.4 (29.5)	4.1 (39.4)	8.9 (48.0)	9.0 (48.2)	3.1 (37.6)	−1.4 (29.5)	−5.4 (22.3)	−18.7 (−1.7)	−24.6 (−12.3)
Average precipitation mm (inches)	118.9 (4.68)	98.5 (3.88)	99.5 (3.92)	109.9 (4.33)	125.0 (4.92)	122.9 (4.84)	197.0 (7.76)	184.6 (7.27)	161.0 (6.34)	175.5 (6.91)	189.1 (7.44)	159.8 (6.29)	1,741.6 (68.57)
Average snowfall cm (inches)	100 (39)	79 (31)	30 (12)	1 (0.4)	0 (0)	0 (0)	0 (0)	0 (0)	0 (0)	0 (0)	6 (2.4)	58 (23)	273 (107)
Average precipitation days (≥ 0.5 mm)	23.8	20.0	17.4	13.2	12.7	11.4	13.2	11.7	13.5	16.0	19.6	23.6	196.0
Average snowy days	28.7	25.3	19.0	3.8	0.0	0.0	0.0	0.0	0.0	0.0	7.7	24.8	108.9
Average relative humidity (%)	74	72	68	67	71	74	79	76	74	73	73	74	73
Mean monthly sunshine hours	39.0	64.3	121.5	168.6	184.9	179.5	150.3	186.9	160.8	143.1	83.2	45.3	1,527.4
Source: Japan Meteorological Agency (1991–2020 normals, extremes 1882–present)

Climate data for Iwami-Sannai, Akita (elevation 41 m, 1991–2020 normals, extremes 1976–present)
Month	Jan	Feb	Mar	Apr	May	Jun	Jul	Aug	Sep	Oct	Nov	Dec	Year
Record high °C (°F)	11.2 (52.2)	19.3 (66.7)	22.7 (72.9)	29.2 (84.6)	32.5 (90.5)	33.4 (92.1)	37.7 (99.9)	37.3 (99.1)	34.8 (94.6)	29.8 (85.6)	24.8 (76.6)	18.6 (65.5)	37.7 (99.9)
Mean daily maximum °C (°F)	1.9 (35.4)	2.9 (37.2)	6.9 (44.4)	13.9 (57.0)	19.9 (67.8)	24.0 (75.2)	27.0 (80.6)	28.8 (83.8)	24.9 (76.8)	18.4 (65.1)	11.2 (52.2)	4.5 (40.1)	15.4 (59.7)
Daily mean °C (°F)	−1.3 (29.7)	−0.9 (30.4)	2.2 (36.0)	8.2 (46.8)	14.2 (57.6)	18.7 (65.7)	22.5 (72.5)	23.7 (74.7)	19.4 (66.9)	12.6 (54.7)	6.4 (43.5)	1.1 (34.0)	10.6 (51.1)
Mean daily minimum °C (°F)	−4.5 (23.9)	−4.5 (23.9)	−2.2 (28.0)	2.4 (36.3)	8.6 (47.5)	13.8 (56.8)	18.6 (65.5)	19.4 (66.9)	14.6 (58.3)	7.5 (45.5)	2.0 (35.6)	−2.0 (28.4)	6.2 (43.2)
Record low °C (°F)	−16.4 (2.5)	−14.6 (5.7)	−12.9 (8.8)	−8.2 (17.2)	−1.2 (29.8)	3.2 (37.8)	9.6 (49.3)	9.7 (49.5)	3.4 (38.1)	−1.6 (29.1)	−5.8 (21.6)	−12.9 (8.8)	−16.4 (2.5)
Average precipitation mm (inches)	141.8 (5.58)	120.3 (4.74)	119.7 (4.71)	129.1 (5.08)	149.2 (5.87)	156.8 (6.17)	258.1 (10.16)	230.4 (9.07)	184.1 (7.25)	189.6 (7.46)	198.5 (7.81)	175.6 (6.91)	2,052.9 (80.82)
Average precipitation days (≥ 1.0 mm)	21.8	19.0	16.8	13.4	12.7	11.7	14.3	12.1	13.6	15.4	18.5	22.1	191.3
Mean monthly sunshine hours	40.9	61.6	100.3	147.8	178.3	174.3	143.0	177.5	149.3	130.4	85.5	45.6	1,431.1
Source: Japan Meteorological Agency (1991–2020 normals, extremes 1976–present)

Climate data for Taishōji, Akita (elevation 20 m, 1991–2020 normals, extremes 1976–present)
Month	Jan	Feb	Mar	Apr	May	Jun	Jul	Aug	Sep	Oct	Nov	Dec	Year
Record high °C (°F)	11.9 (53.4)	20.4 (68.7)	21.6 (70.9)	28.9 (84.0)	31.8 (89.2)	33.1 (91.6)	36.8 (98.2)	37.2 (99.0)	34.3 (93.7)	29.9 (85.8)	24.3 (75.7)	17.4 (63.3)	37.2 (99.0)
Mean daily maximum °C (°F)	2.1 (35.8)	3.1 (37.6)	7.1 (44.8)	14.2 (57.6)	20.1 (68.2)	24.1 (75.4)	27.1 (80.8)	28.8 (83.8)	24.7 (76.5)	18.3 (64.9)	11.3 (52.3)	4.5 (40.1)	15.4 (59.7)
Daily mean °C (°F)	−0.9 (30.4)	−0.6 (30.9)	2.3 (36.1)	8.2 (46.8)	14.1 (57.4)	18.6 (65.5)	22.4 (72.3)	23.6 (74.5)	19.2 (66.6)	12.5 (54.5)	6.3 (43.3)	1.2 (34.2)	10.6 (51.1)
Mean daily minimum °C (°F)	−3.8 (25.2)	−3.9 (25.0)	−1.8 (28.8)	2.4 (36.3)	8.5 (47.3)	13.8 (56.8)	18.5 (65.3)	19.3 (66.7)	14.7 (58.5)	7.7 (45.9)	2.0 (35.6)	−1.7 (28.9)	6.3 (43.3)
Record low °C (°F)	−15.1 (4.8)	−16.1 (3.0)	−12.8 (9.0)	−8.8 (16.2)	−1.5 (29.3)	4.6 (40.3)	8.4 (47.1)	9.9 (49.8)	3.5 (38.3)	−1.4 (29.5)	−8.1 (17.4)	−12.4 (9.7)	−16.1 (3.0)
Average precipitation mm (inches)	169.7 (6.68)	121.0 (4.76)	115.4 (4.54)	117.4 (4.62)	130.0 (5.12)	148.1 (5.83)	229.6 (9.04)	226.2 (8.91)	193.9 (7.63)	198.0 (7.80)	227.0 (8.94)	212.9 (8.38)	2,089 (82.24)
Average snowfall cm (inches)	199 (78)	160 (63)	73 (29)	2 (0.8)	0 (0)	0 (0)	0 (0)	0 (0)	0 (0)	0 (0)	12 (4.7)	119 (47)	564 (222)
Average precipitation days (≥ 1.0 mm)	23.9	19.5	17.2	12.8	12.4	11.0	13.9	12.2	14.0	16.1	19.7	23.9	196.6
Mean monthly sunshine hours	32.6	53.0	106.9	167.3	188.2	177.5	150.2	185.4	150.7	132.3	80.9	39.9	1,464.8
Source: Japan Meteorological Agency (1991–2020 normals, extremes 1976–present)

Climate data for Yūwa, Akita (2003−2020 normals, extremes 2003−present)
Month	Jan	Feb	Mar	Apr	May	Jun	Jul	Aug	Sep	Oct	Nov	Dec	Year
Record high °C (°F)	9.8 (49.6)	17.0 (62.6)	20.3 (68.5)	29.1 (84.4)	31.4 (88.5)	33.3 (91.9)	35.3 (95.5)	37.2 (99.0)	34.8 (94.6)	28.8 (83.8)	24.3 (75.7)	14.9 (58.8)	37.2 (99.0)
Mean daily maximum °C (°F)	1.7 (35.1)	2.9 (37.2)	7.1 (44.8)	13.4 (56.1)	19.8 (67.6)	23.8 (74.8)	26.8 (80.2)	28.7 (83.7)	24.8 (76.6)	18.2 (64.8)	11.4 (52.5)	4.4 (39.9)	15.3 (59.4)
Daily mean °C (°F)	−0.9 (30.4)	−0.5 (31.1)	2.9 (37.2)	8.4 (47.1)	14.6 (58.3)	18.9 (66.0)	22.5 (72.5)	24.1 (75.4)	19.8 (67.6)	13.2 (55.8)	7.1 (44.8)	1.5 (34.7)	11.0 (51.7)
Mean daily minimum °C (°F)	−3.6 (25.5)	−3.8 (25.2)	−1.0 (30.2)	3.4 (38.1)	9.7 (49.5)	14.7 (58.5)	19.2 (66.6)	20.3 (68.5)	15.8 (60.4)	8.9 (48.0)	3.3 (37.9)	−1.2 (29.8)	7.1 (44.8)
Record low °C (°F)	−13.0 (8.6)	−12.9 (8.8)	−9.2 (15.4)	−4.2 (24.4)	1.1 (34.0)	6.1 (43.0)	13.0 (55.4)	12.2 (54.0)	6.1 (43.0)	0.8 (33.4)	−4.3 (24.3)	−9.6 (14.7)	−13.0 (8.6)
Average precipitation mm (inches)	120.1 (4.73)	97.0 (3.82)	105.9 (4.17)	118.6 (4.67)	117.0 (4.61)	133.0 (5.24)	225.7 (8.89)	207.2 (8.16)	176.3 (6.94)	184.8 (7.28)	205.7 (8.10)	170.7 (6.72)	1,862 (73.31)
Average snowfall cm (inches)	77 (30)	75 (30)	7 (2.8)	3 (1.2)	0 (0)	0 (0)	0 (0)	0 (0)	0 (0)	0 (0)	4 (1.6)	65 (26)	230 (91)
Average precipitation days (≥ 1.0 mm)	21.4	16.7	15.4	12.9	11.2	9.7	12.9	10.8	13.7	14.4	18.6	23.3	181
Average snowy days (≥ 1 cm)	9.5	8.0	1.0	0.5	0	0	0	0	0	0	0.5	6.0	25.5
Source: JMA

== Government ==
Akita has a directly elected mayor and a unicameral city assembly with 39 members. The city contributes 12 members to the Akita Prefectural Assembly. In terms of national politics, the city is part of Akita District 1 of the lower house of the Diet of Japan.

== Economy ==
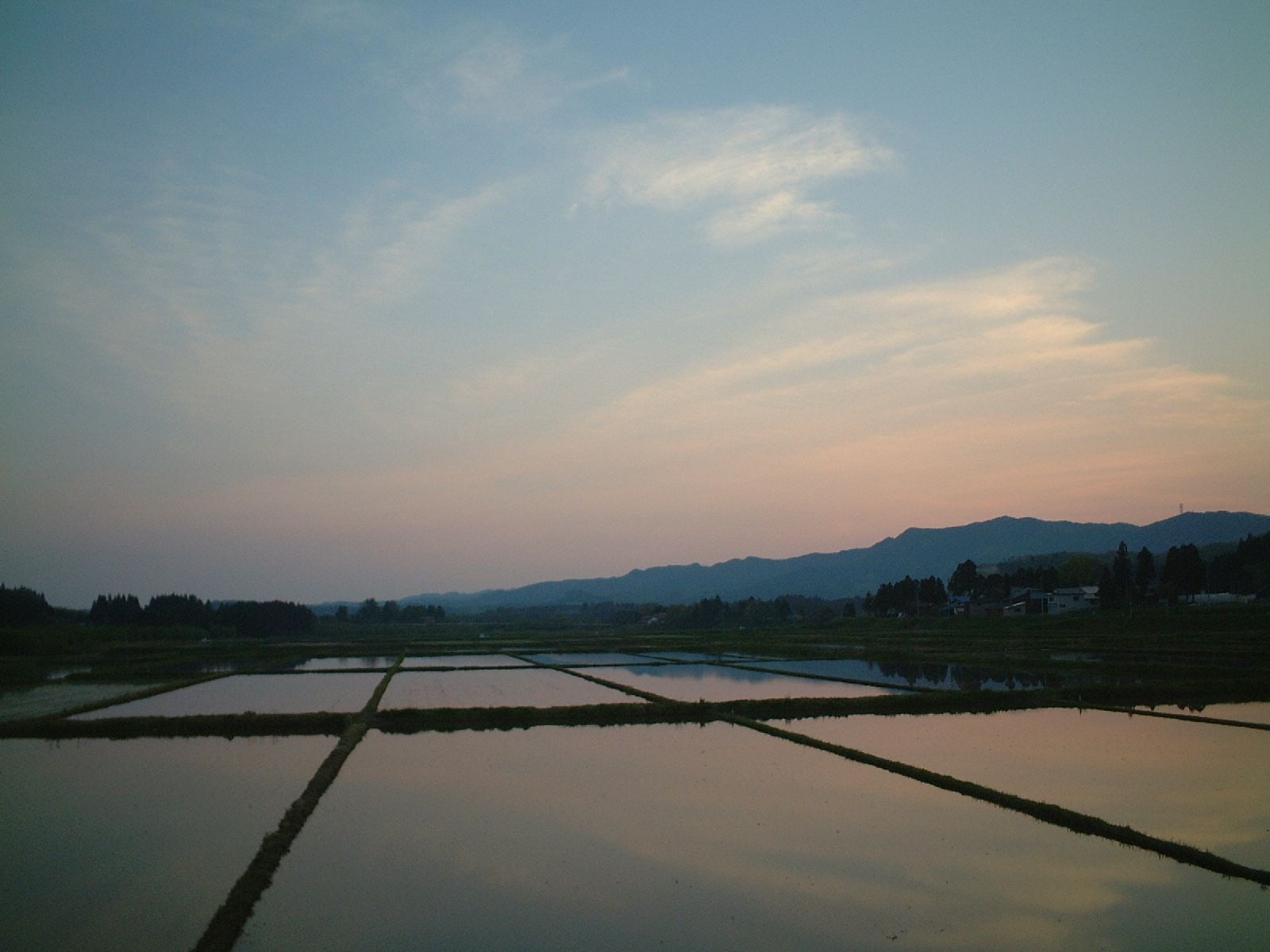
A sunset in the northern outskirts of Akita City

The economy of Akita remains heavily dependent on agriculture (particularly rice cultivation), forestry and mineral extraction. Akita contains one of the most important oil fields in Japan. Oil refining, woodworking, metalworking, and the production of silk textiles are the main industries. Akita is also home to two regional banks that serve Akita prefecture and the greater Tōhoku region: Akita Bank and Hokuto Bank.

The Akita Thermal Power Station is located in the city.

== Education ==
=== Universities ===
- Akita University
- Akita University of Art
- Akita Prefectural University
- Akita International University
- Akita Nutrition Junior College
- Japanese Red Cross Tohoku College of Nursing
- Misono Gakuen Junior College
- North Asia University
- Open University of Japan Akita learning center
- Seirei Women's Junior College

=== Primary and secondary education ===
Akita has 44 city and one national elementary schools, 22 city, one prefectural, one national and one private middle schools, and one combined city middle/high school. There are eight prefectural, one city and seven private high schools, as well as four prefectural and one national special education school.

==== High schools ====
- Akita High School

== Transportation ==
=== Airports ===
- Akita Airport

=== Railway ===
- JR East – Akita Shinkansen
  - Akita

East Japan Railway Company - Ōu Main Line

- Ōbarino - Wada - Yotsugoya - Akita - Tsuchizaki - Kami-Iijima - Oiwake

East Japan Railway Company - Uetsu Main Line

- Shimohama - Katsurane - Araya - Ugo-Ushijima - Akita

East Japan Railway Company - Oga Line

- Oiwake
- Akita Rinkai Railway Company (freight)

=== Highway ===
- Akita Expressway
- Nihonkai-Tōhoku Expressway
- National Route 7
- National Route 13
- National Route 46
- National Route 101
- National Route 285
- National Route 341

=== Bus ===
- Akita Chūō Kōtsū

=== Seaports ===
- Port of Akita

== Mass media ==
- Akita Asahi Broadcasting
- Akita Broadcasting System
- Akita Community Broadcasting
- Akita Television
- Cable Networks Akita
- FM Tsubakidai

== Local attractions ==
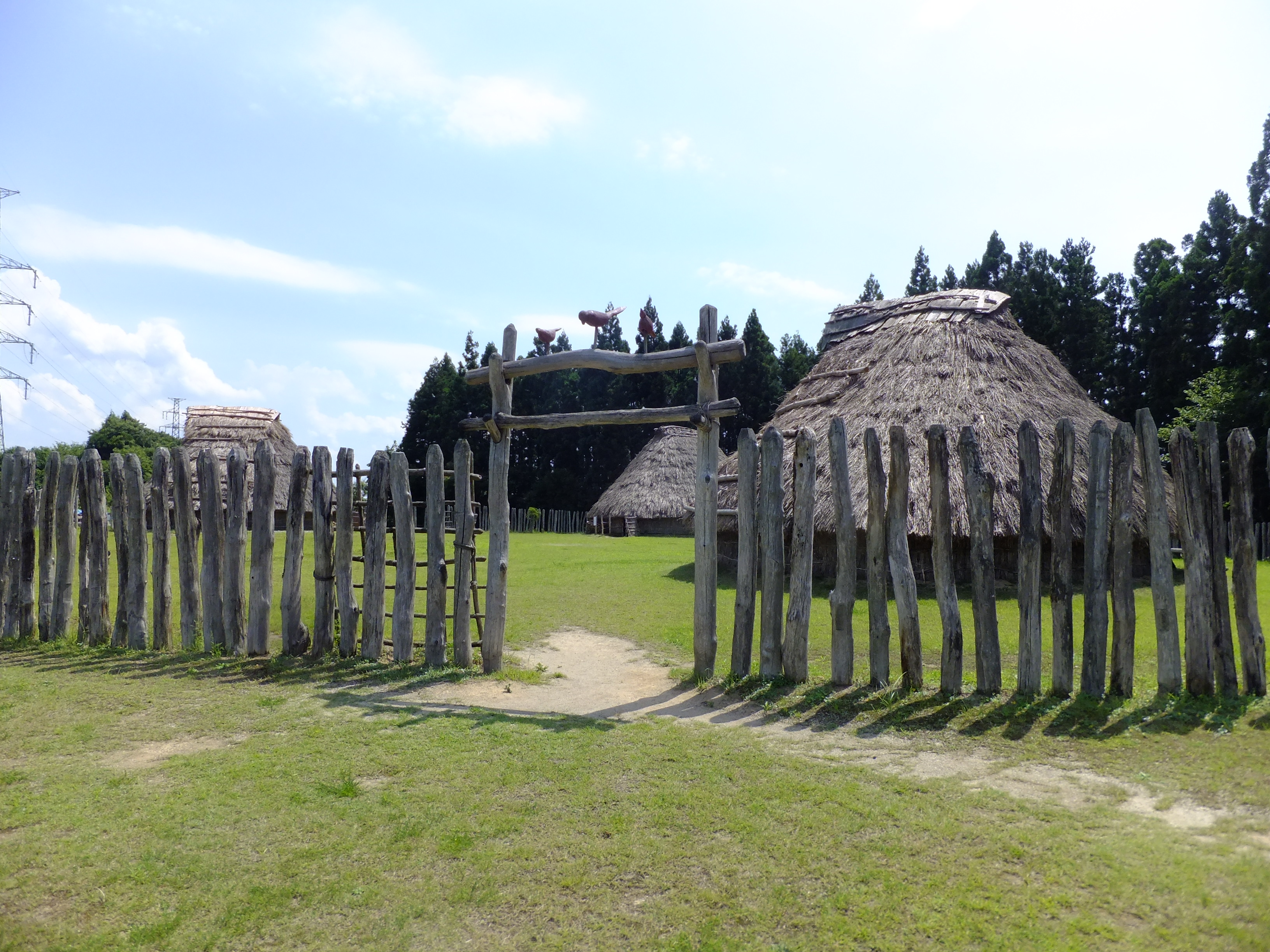
Thatched roof in Jizōden Archaeological Park

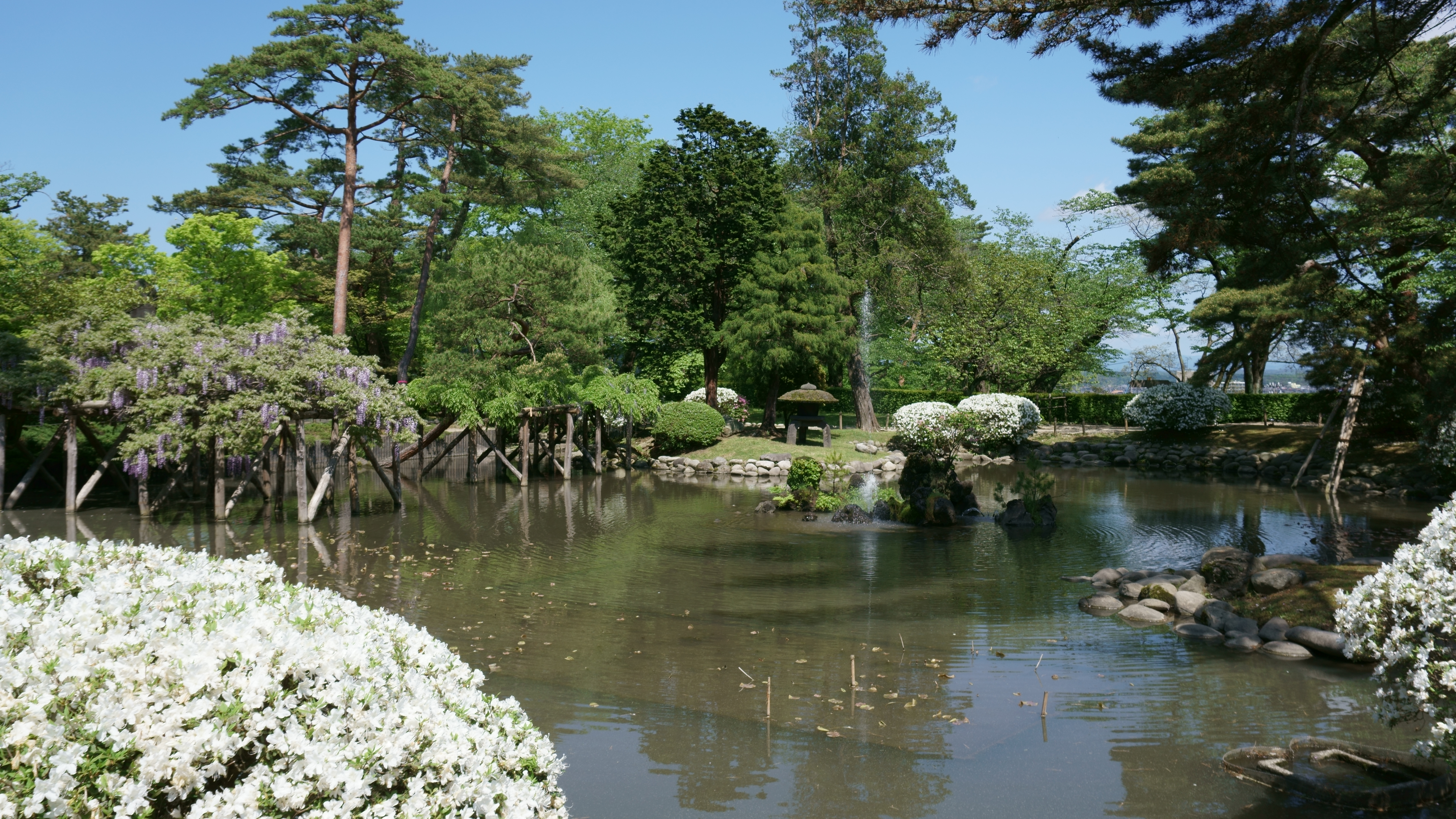
Akita Senshu Park

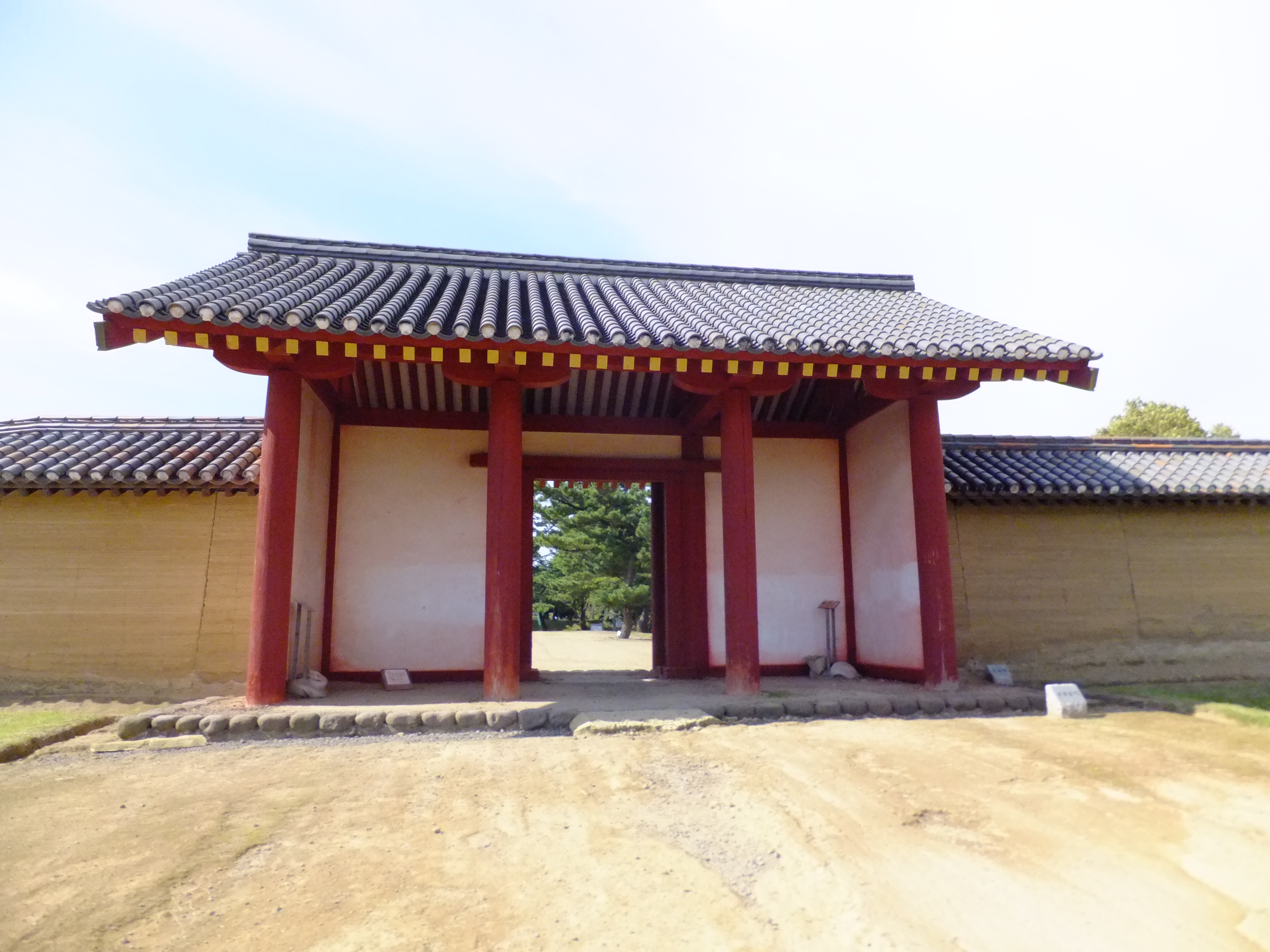
Reconstructed East Gate of Akita Castle

- Site of Kubota Castle (Senshu Park)
- Site of Akita Castle (Takashimizu Park), National Historic Site
- Minato Castle (Tsuchizaki Gaiku Park, Shinmeisha)
- Jizōden ruins, National Historic Site
- Akita Prefectural Museum
- Akita Senshū Museum of Art
- Akita Museum of Art
- Akita Omoriyama Zoo
- Akita Port Tower Selion
- CNA Arena Akita
- Sakigake Yabase Baseball Stadium
- Akita Prefectural Baseball Stadium
- Akita Yabase Athletic Field
- Akita Prefectural Gymnasium
- Akita Prefectural Central Park
- Akita Prefectural General Pool
- Akita Prefectural Budokan
- Akita Peace Pagoda
- Koshiō Shrine

== Local events ==
=== Akita Kanto Festival ===
This representative summer festival began 350 years ago, with features similar to tanabata festivals held elsewhere in Japan. During this festival, participants balance on their chins the 15-meter poles hung with 230 lanterns. The main event is held during the evening and night hours, between the 3rd and 6 August each year.

During the festival, Kanto stunt events are held in Senshu Park during daylight hours involving many amateur participants. This event was first held in 1931 and every subsequent year, except between 1935 and 1946 and in 1953 and 1965. Overseas exhibitions of the festival were performed in Hamburg, Germany, in 1988, Honolulu, Hawaii, in 2002, London, UK, in 2004, and as an opening event at the 2001 World Games.

=== Marian apparitions ===
Our Lady of Akita is the title of Marian apparitions reported in 1973 by Sister Agnes Katsuko Sasagawa in Yuzawadai, Soegawa, Akita City. The apparitions were approved by the Holy See in 1988. The 1988 approval was issued by Cardinal Joseph Ratzinger, who later became Pope Benedict XVI.

=== Narayama Kamakura Festival ===
In the Narayama Otamachi district of central Akita each February 12–15 a Shinto festival honoring both Suijin and Kamakura Daimyojin is held inside a shrine made from walls of snow. A rice bale is set afire at the end of this festival.

=== Tsuchizaki Minato Festival ===
Each neighbourhood in Tsuchizaki Minato contributes a float decorated with giant figures from 20 to 21 July. In 1997 it was designated an Important Intangible Folk Cultural Property.

== Sister cities ==
=== International sister cities ===
- Lanzhou, Gansu, China, since August 5, 1982
- Passau, Lower Bavaria, Germany, since 8 April 1984
- Malabon, Philippines, since 15 July 1987
- Kenai, Alaska, United States of America
- St. Cloud, Minnesota, United States of America (with Yūwa, Akita, which merged with Akita), since 1993
- Vladivostok, Primorsky Krai, Russia, since 29 June 1992
- Nanning, Guangxi, China, since 22 November 2021
- Singkawang, West Kalimantan, Indonesia

=== Domestic sister cities ===
- (Japan) Daigo, Kuji District, Ibaraki Prefecture
- (Japan) Hitachiōta, Ibaraki Prefecture

== Notable people ==
- Masamichi Amano, composer
- Michio Ashikaga, professional soccer player
- Yukiko Ebata, professional women's volleyball player
- Hiroki Endo, manga artist
- Yukio Endō, Olympic gymnast
- Hiroyuki Enoki, professional boxer
- Shirō Fukai, composer
- Takunosuke Funakawa, footballer
- Masanori Ishikawa, professional baseball player
- Taka Kato, adult movie actor
- Yudai Koga (K), member of Japanese boy-group &Team
- Chūji Machida, politician, cabinet minister
- Hiroya Matsumoto, actor
- Hiroko Nagasaki, Olympic swimmer
- Emiko Okuyama, politician
- Akira Ota, Olympic wrestler
- Junko Sakurada, singer
- Nozomi Sasaki, model, actress
- Takenori Sato, professional mixed martial artist
- Tadashi Settsu, professional baseball player
- Kohei Shimoda, professional soccer player
- Taro Shoji, singer
- Tensho Sugimoto, basketball player
- Kenji Suzuki (footballer)
- Mitsuhisa Taguchi, professional soccer player
- Kenta Tateyama, professional basketball player
- Go Togashi, footballer for Blaublitz Akita
- Setsurō Wakamatsu, movie director
- Ren Yamamoto (footballer, born 1999)
- Koharu Yonemoto, professional badminton player
- Yu Takahashi, singer-songwriter

== Sports ==
- Basketball: Akita Northern Happinets, Prestige International Aranmare Akita
- Football: Blaublitz Akita, Saruta Kōgyō S.C., Akita FC Cambiare
- Rugby union: Akita Northern Bullets
