= Kawabe =

Kawabe (Japanese: 川辺 or 河辺) may refer to:

== Places ==
- Kawabe District, Hyōgo
- Kawabe District, Akita
  - Kawabe, Akita
- Kawabe, Ehime
- Kawabe, Wakayama
- Kawabe, Gifu
- Kawabe Station (Aomori)

== People with the surname ==
- Chieko Kawabe (1987- ), Japanese singer
- Hayao Kawabe (川辺 駿; born 1995), Japanese footballer
- Masakazu Kawabe (1886–1965), Japanese general
- Torashirō Kawabe (1890–1960), Japanese general
- Yuki Kawabe (川邊 裕紀; born 1987), Japanese footballer
