= Akita Airport =

Airport in Akita Prefecture, Japan

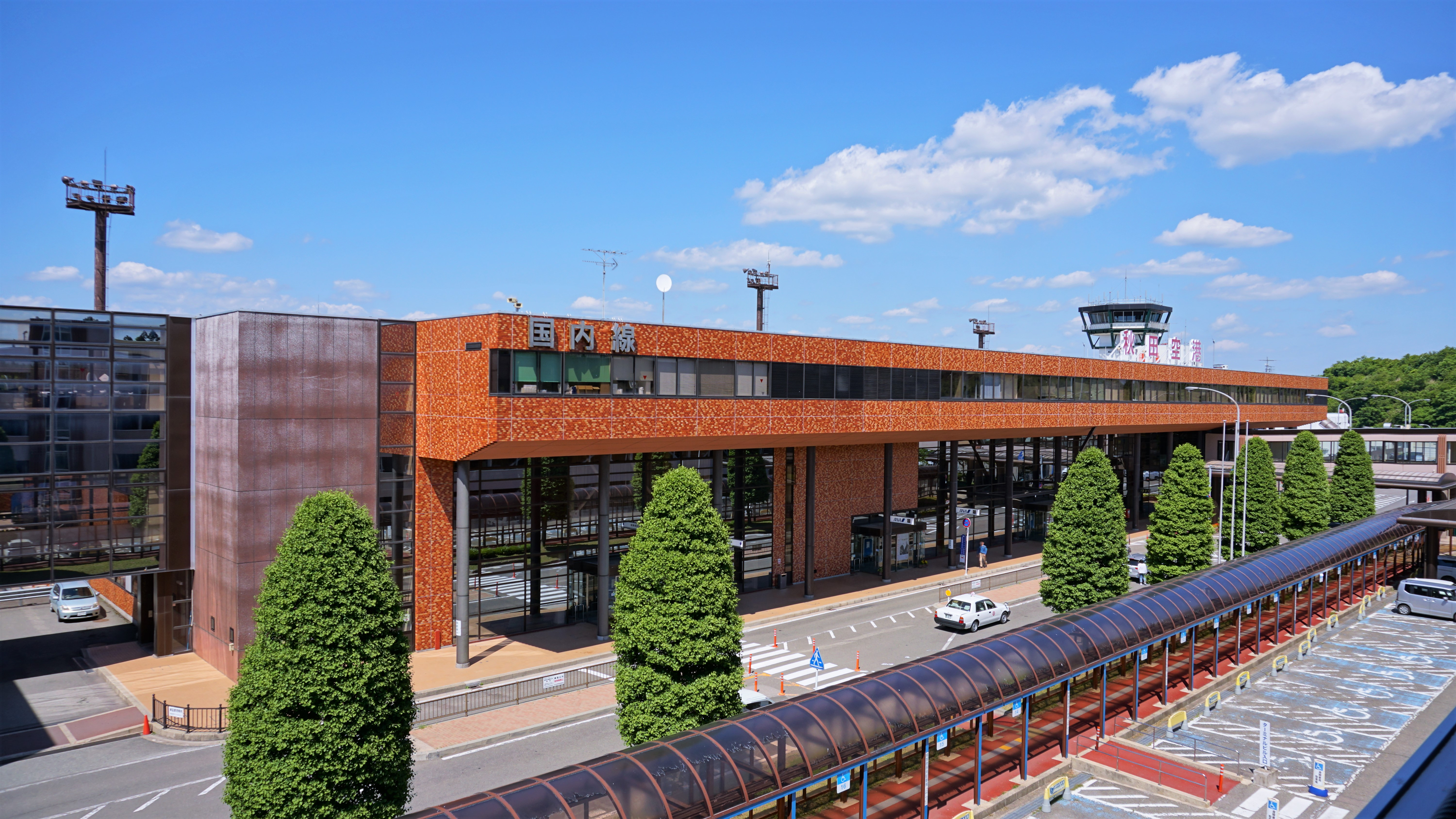
- Domestic terminal
- IATA: AXT; ICAO: RJSK; WMO: 47545

Summary
- Airport type: Public
- Operator: Akita Prefecture
- Location: Akita, Akita Prefecture, Japan
- Opened: June 26, 1981; 45 years ago
- Elevation AMSL: 93 m (305 ft)
- Coordinates: 39°36′56″N 140°13′07″E

Map
- Location in Akita Prefecture Location in Japan

Runways
Direction	Length		Surface
Direction	m	ft	Surface
10/28	2,500	8,202	Asphalt/concrete

Statistics (2015)
- Passengers: 1,238,082
- Cargo (metric tonnes): 1,711
- Aircraft movements: 18,967
- Source: Japanese Ministry of Land, Infrastructure, Transport and Tourism

Akita Airport (秋田空港, Akita Kūkō) (IATA: AXT, ICAO: RJSK) is an airport located 14 km (8.7 mi) southeast of Akita Station, in Akita City, Akita Prefecture, Japan.

== History ==
The first Akita Airport was opened on October 1, 1961, on the Omonogawa coast of the Sea of Japan approximately 20 kilometers southeast of the center of Akita City. The airport originally had a 1,200-meter runway, which was extended to 1,500 meters in 1967 and 1,625 meters in 1969, but was adversely affected by crosswinds, and by the television transmission antennas of 123-meter Mount Omoriyama adjacent to the site.

The current Akita Airport was opened at its present location (in the former town of Yūwa in Kawabe District) on June 26, 1981, and was the first civilian airport in the Tōhoku region of Japan to have a 2,500-meter runway. In 1985, the Japan Air Self-Defense Force established a search and rescue unit based at Akita Airport. As of 2016 it is equipped with UH-60J and U-125A aircraft. An international terminal was established on July 5, 1993, beginning scheduled flights to South Korea.

== Airlines and destinations ==
Airlines	Destinations
All Nippon Airways	Tokyo–Haneda
ANA Wings	Nagoya–Centrair, Osaka–Itami, Sapporo–Chitose
Hokkaido Air System	Sapporo–Okadama
J-Air	Osaka–Itami
Japan Airlines	Tokyo–Haneda
Oriental Air Bridge	Nagoya–Centrair
Tigerair Taiwan	Taipei–Taoyuan
