= FM Tsubakidai =

JOZZ2AS-FM
- Yuwa, Akita, Japan; Japan
- Broadcast area: Akita
- Frequency: 79.6MHz
- Branding: FM Tsubakidai

Programming
- Languages: Akita dialect, Japanese
- Format: Music/Talk
- Affiliations: Music Bird

History
- First air date: August 21, 2001

Technical information
- Power: 20W
- Transmitter coordinates: Takaosan 39°32′45.9″N 140°11′35.5″E

Links
- Website: Official website

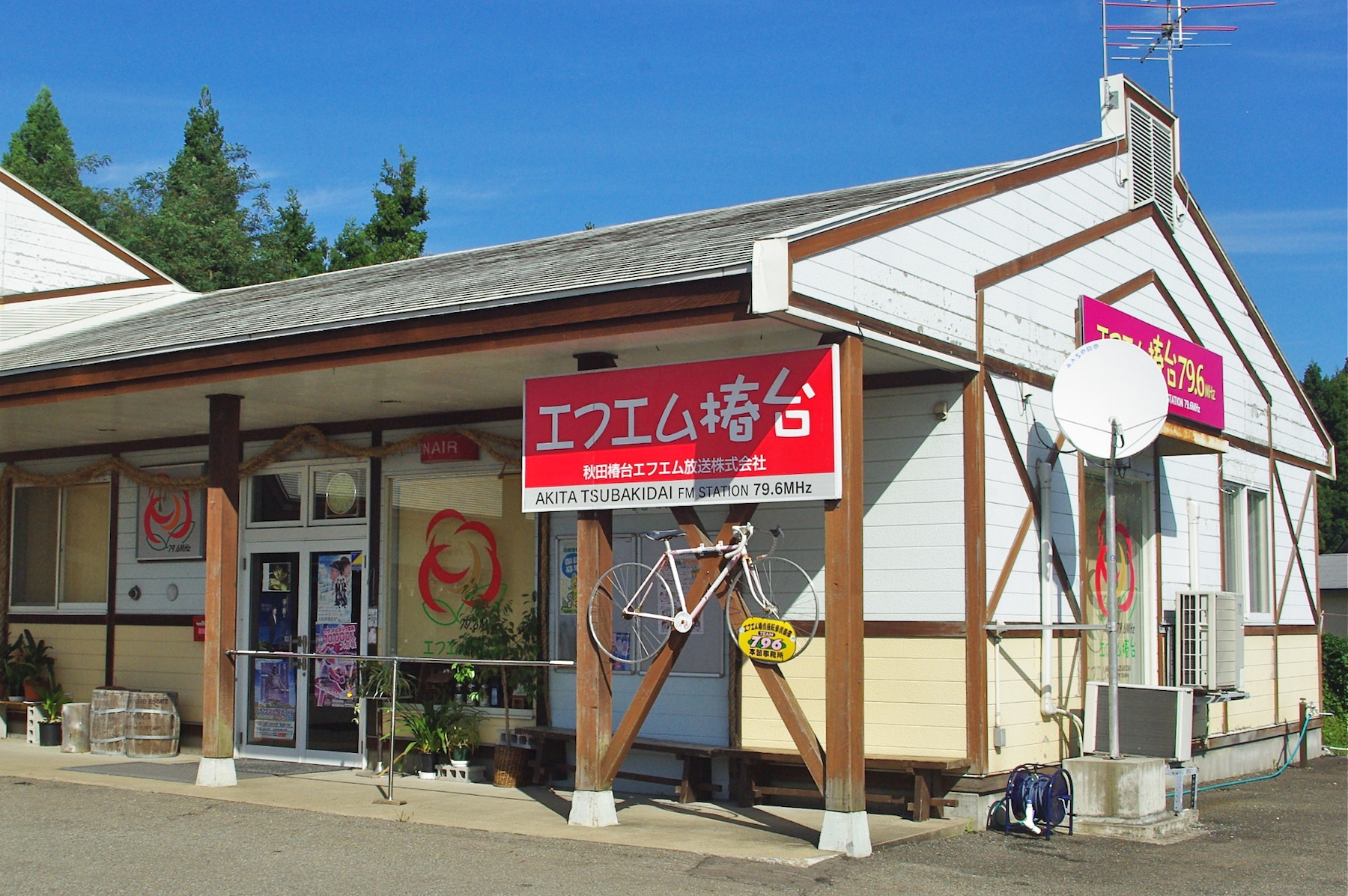
Headquarters/Studio

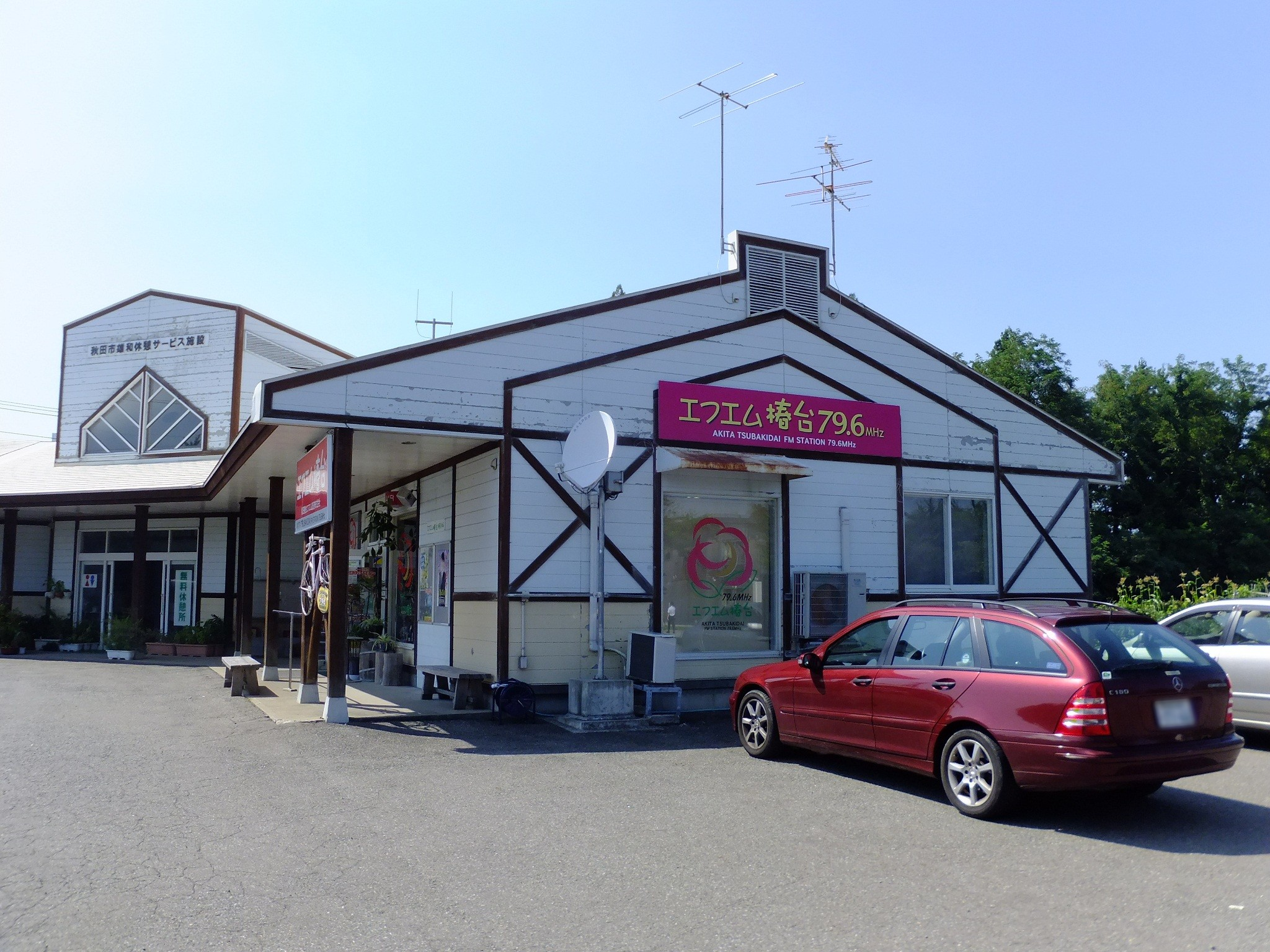

Akita Tsubakidai FM Broadcast System Co., Ltd. (秋田椿台エフエム放送株式会社, Akita Tsubakidai FM Hoso Kabushiki-gaisha) is a Japanese FM station based in Yuwa, Akita, Japan.

== Programs in Akita dialect ==
- Bangedai Tsubakidai
- Abe Juzen no Hanasaka Jiisan

== Rebroadcasters ==
- Noshiro.FM 88.8Mhz (Mini FM)
