= Kawabe District =

Kawabe District may refer to:

- Kawabe District, Hyōgo, a district in Japan
- Kawabe District, Akita, a former district in Japan
