= Nagatoro Domain =

Ryūgasaki Domain (1871) 龍ヶ崎藩 Ōami Domain (1869–1871) 大網藩 Nagatoro Domain (1798–1869) 長瀞藩
- Domain of Japan
- 1798–1871
- Capital: Nagatoro jin'ya (1798–1869); Ōami jin'ya (1869–71); Ryūgasaki jin'ya (1871)
  - Type: Daimyō
- Historical era: Edo period
  - Established: 1798
  - Disestablished: 1871
- Today part of: Yamagata Prefecture, Chiba Prefecture, Ibaraki Prefecture

Nagatoro Domain (長瀞藩, Nagatoro-han) was a minor feudal domain in Edo period Japan, located in Dewa Province (modern-day Yamagata Prefecture), Japan. It was centered on Nagatoro Jin'ya in what is now part of the city of Higashine, Yamagata.

== History ==
Nagatoro Domain was established by Yonekitsu Michimasa, daimyō of Kuki Domain in Musashi Province. The Yonekitsu territories were scattered across Musashi, Kazusa, Shimōsa, and Hitachi Provinces in addition to their small holding in Dewa. Yonekitsu Michimasa traded is 6400 koku in Musashi for lands in Murayama District of Dewa, and moved his seat from Kuri to Nagatoro in 1798. The third and fourth daimyō, Yonekitsu Masayasu and Yonekitsu Masaaki, was born as the 10th and 11th sons of Sakai Tadakata of Shōnai Domain and was adopted into the clan.

The domain had a population of 2466 per the 1850 census and maintained its primary Edo residence (kamiyashiki) in Atago-shita.

During the Bakumatsu period, Yonekitsu Masaaki took the unusual step of arming and training 30 commoners in the domain as an auxiliary military force; however, the Boshin War bypassed the domain. After the Meiji restoration, in November 1869, Yonekitsu Masatoshi, the final daimyō, transferred his seat from Nagatoro to his estates in Kazusa, abolishing Nagatoro Domain and creating the new Ōami Domain (大網藩, Ōami-han). After the abolition of the han system in July 1871, the Dewa territories of Ōami Domain was absorbed into Yamagata Prefecture. Yonekitsu Masatoshi subsequently served in the Imperial Japanese Army as a member of the Imperial Guard and in 1884 was granted the title of viscount (shishaku) in the kazoku peerage.

== Bakumatsu period holdings ==
- Dewa Province (Uzen)
  - 4 villages in Murayama District
- Shimōsa Province
  - 4 villages in Toyoda District
  - 1 village in Chiba District
  - 1 village in Shimohabu District
- Kazusa Province
  - 2 villages in Nagara District
  - 3 villages in Yamabe District
  - 2 villages in Musha District

== List of daimyō ==
- Yonekitsu clan (tozama) 1789-1869

#	Name	Tenure	Courtesy title	Court Rank	revenues
1	Yonekitsu Michimasa (米津通政)	1789–1799	Dewa-no-kami (出羽守)	Lower 5th (従五位下)	11,000 koku
2	Yonekitsu Masayoshi (米津政懿)	1799-1853	Etchu-no-kami (越中守)	Lower 5th (従五位下)	11,000 koku
3	Yonekitsu Masayasu (米津政易)	1854–1860	Sagami-no-kami (相模守)	Lower 5th (従五位下)	11,000 koku
4	Yonekitsu Masaaki (米津政明)	1860-1865	Ise-no-kami (伊勢守)	Lower 5th (従五位下)	11,000 koku
5	Yonekitsu Masatoshi (米津政敏)	1865–1869	Ise-no-kami (伊勢守)	Lower 5th (従五位下)	11,000 koku
