= Akita Castle =

Fortress in Japan

Akita Castle 秋田城
- Akita, Akita Prefecture, Japan
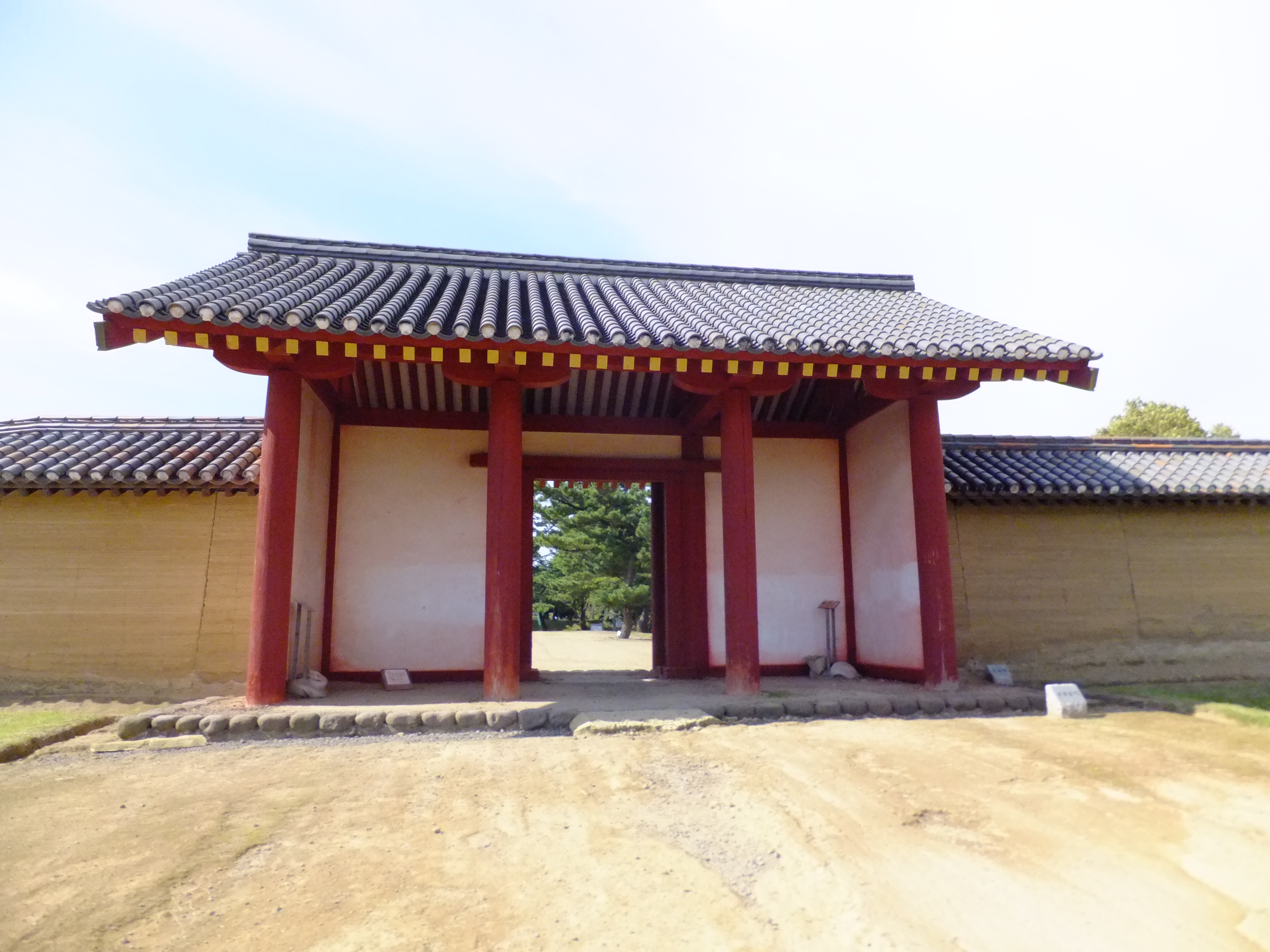
- Reconstructed East Gate of Akita Castle

Site information
- Type: hirayama-style Japanese castle
- Owner: 1994-2008
- Open to the public: yes

Location
- Coordinates: 39.7403°N 140.0794°E

Site history
- Built: 780
- Built by: Ritsuryo government
- Demolished: 1050

Akita Castle (秋田城, Akita-jō) refers to the ruins of a Nara period fortified settlement located in what is now the city Akita, Akita Prefecture, Japan. It is also sometimes referred to as “Fort Akita”. The name is sometimes used wrongly for Kubota Castle, an Edo period Japanese castle which served as the headquarters or the Satake, daimyō of Kubota Domain that was a domain in the northern part of Dewa Province created by the Tokugawa shogunate.

== History ==
During the Asuka period, Abe no Hirafu conquered the native Emishi tribes at what are now the cities of Akita and Noshiro in 658 and established a fortification on the Mogami River. In the year 708 AD, “Dewa Country” was created out of the northern half of Echigo Province and was raised in status to Dewa Province in 712 AD. However, at that time the region was still outside the effective control of the imperial court based in Nara. A number of military expeditions were sent to the area, with armed colonists forming settlements fortified with moats and wooden palisades across central Dewa in what is now the Shōnai area of Yamagata Prefecture. In 733, the fort on the Mogami River was moved north, and a new military settlement, later named “Akita Castle”, was built what is now in the Takashimizu area of the city of Akita. Abe no Yakamaro was sent as Chinjufu-Shōgun, and Akita Castle became a base of operations to colonize the region and to subdue the native Emishi peoples.

In 737, a major military operation began to connect Akita Castle with Taga Castle on the Pacific Coast. Over the next 50 years, additional fortifications were erected at Okachi in Dewa Province and Monofu in Mutsu Province involving a force of over 5000 men. The road was greatly resented by the Emishi tribes, and after an uprising in 767, pacification expeditions were carried out in 776, 778, 794, 801 and 811.

The castle was severely damaged in an earthquake in 830. In 878, a major rebellion known as the Ganki Disturbance (元慶の乱) erupted in the region against Yamato rule, which resulted in the destruction of a large part of Akita Castle. Another major uprising occurred in 939, known as the Tenki Disturbance (天慶の乱). However, Akita Castle was restored after each disaster and remained in use until the mid-Heian period. From the 9th through the 11th centuries, Akita Castle was the residence of the “Dewa-no-suke”, or nominal deputy governor of Dewa Province. The title was later changed to “Akita-no-suke”. However, the castle was abandoned around 1050 during the Former Nine Years War.

=== Diplomatic Functions ===
The imperial dynasty built this northernmost fortification because it thought necessary to have an outpost there to properly receive (and occasionally refuse) diplomatic delegations from Balhae/Bohai. Because of the irregularity and unpredictability with which those delegations arrived, the dynasty once decided to abolish the Akita Castle in 770 but withdrew the decision ten years later. The very existence of the Akita Castle depended on Balhae/Bohai delegations until the end of the 8th century when the Balhae/Bohai delegations definitively changed their navigation route to Japan as they learned by then to build ships large enough to cross the Sea of Japan directly to the Noto Peninsula, they abandoned the northern route via the western coast of Hokkaido. The Akita Castle then lost its diplomatic functions, which affected even its physical appearance.

=== Present day ===
Akita Castle was surrounded by earthen ramparts and had gates at each of the cardinal points. Archaeological excavations have found the foundations of the barracks as well as official buildings for the government of Dewa Province, as well as ceramic roof tiles, wooden tally boards and documents on varnished paper.

The site was proclaimed a National Historic Site in 1939. Archaeological excavations indicate that the site had approximate dimensions of 94 meters east-west and 77 meters north-south. A number of the structures of Akita Castle have been reconstructed on their original foundations.

== Literature ==
- De Lange, William (2021). An Encyclopedia of Japanese Castles. Groningen: Toyo Press. pp. 600 pages. ISBN 978-9492722300.
- Schmorleitz, Morton S. (1974). Castles in Japan. Tokyo: Charles E. Tuttle Co. pp. 144–145. ISBN 0-8048-1102-4.
- Motoo, Hinago (1986). Japanese Castles. Tokyo: Kodansha. p. 200 pages. ISBN 0-87011-766-1.
- Turnbull, Stephen (2003). Japanese Castles 1540-1640. Osprey Publishing. p. 64 pages. ISBN 1-84176-429-9.
