= Misono Gakuen Junior College =

Coordinates: 39°43′24″N 140°6′50″E

- 聖園学園短期大学
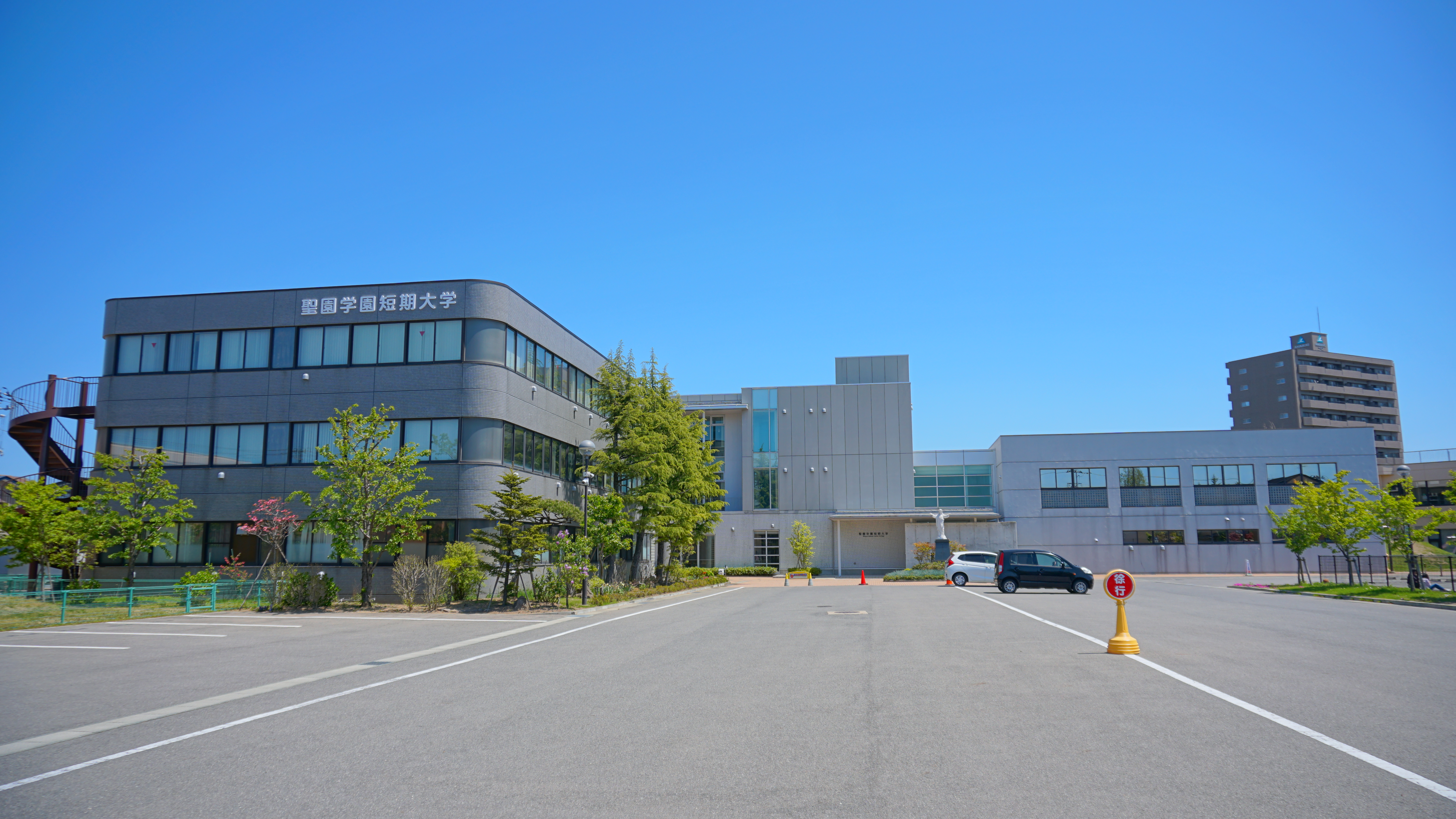
- Type: Private
- Established: 1966
- Affiliations: Roman Catholic Church
- Location: Akita, Akita Prefecture, Japan
- Website: http://www.misono-jc.ac.jp/

Misono Gakuen Junior College (聖園学園短期大学, Misono gakuen tanki daigaku) is a private junior college, located in the city of Akita, Japan.

== History ==
Misono School was opened by the Missionary Sisters of the Sacred Heart in Akita City in 1940, and established a kindergarten teachers training school in 1957. It was officially chartered as a junior college in 1966. The school offers a curriculum for obtaining a teacher's certificate for nursery schools or kindergartens.
