= Seirei Women's Junior College =

Coordinates: 39°44′34.8″N 140°5′11.3″E

- 聖霊女子短期大学
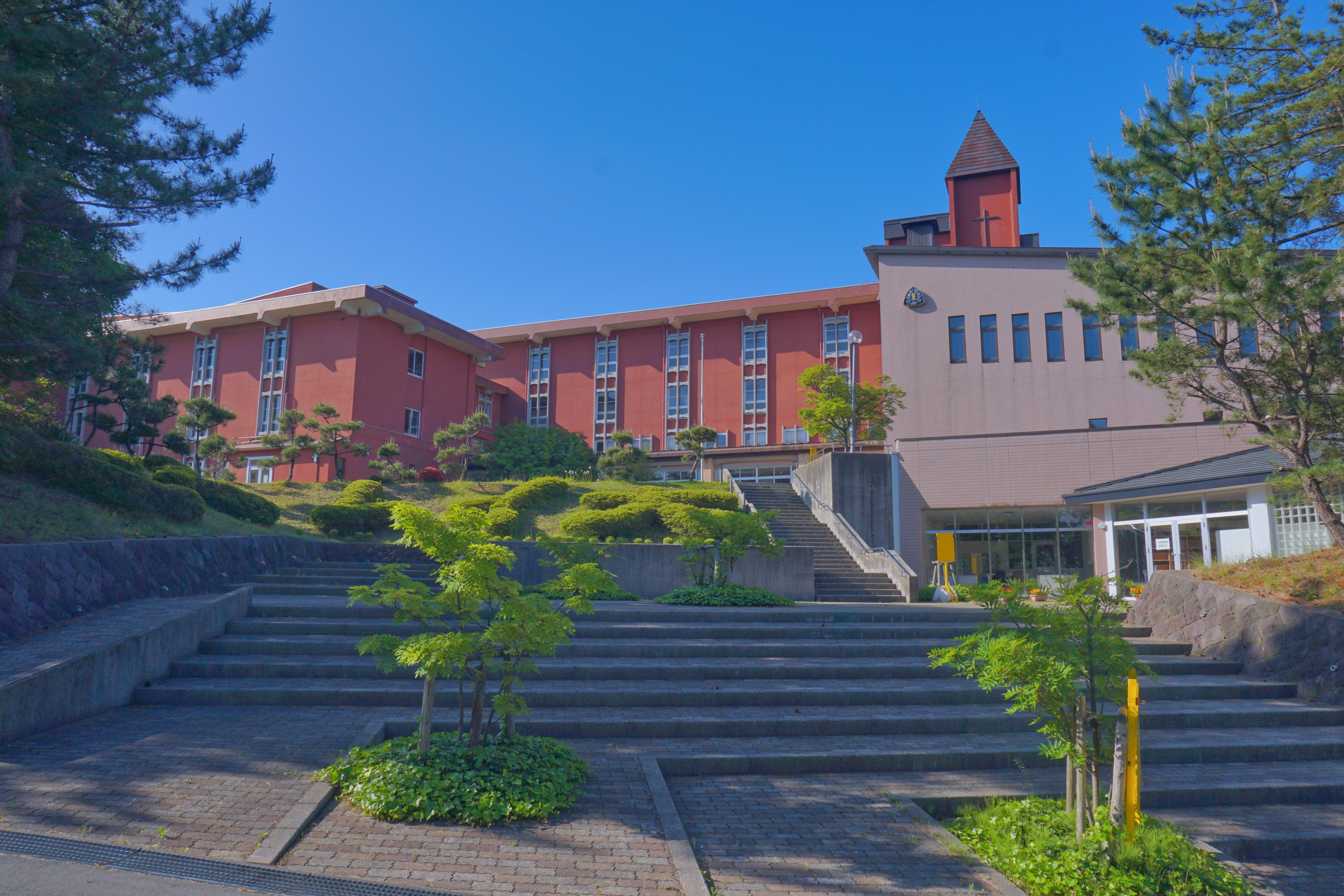
- Type: Private
- Established: 1954
- Affiliations: Roman Catholic Church
- Location: Akita, Akita, Japan
- Website: http://www.seirei-wjc.ac.jp/

Seirei Women's Junior College (聖霊女子短期大学, Seirei Joshi Tanki Daigakubu) is a private junior college, located in the city of Akita, Japan. The school is affiliated with the Roman Catholic Church.

== History ==
The School of the Holy Spirit was opened by the Missionary Sisters Servants of the Holy Spirit from the Netherlands in Akita City in 1908. It was officially chartered as a junior college in 1954.

== Organization ==
- School of Home Economics
  - Department of Nutrition
  - Department of Nursery Education
