= Dewa Province =

Former province of Japan

Coordinates: 39°00′59″N 140°19′02″E

Dewa Province 出羽国
- Province of Japan
- 712–1869
- Map of Japanese provinces (1868) with Dewa Province highlighted
- Capital: Hiraka District
- History
  - Established: 712
  - Disestablished: 1869
Preceded by	Succeeded by
Echigo Province	Uzen Province; Ugo Province
- Today part of: Akita Prefecture; Yamagata Prefecture

Dewa Province (出羽国, Dewa no Kuni; Japanese pronunciation: [dé̞.β̞ä̀ (nò̞ kɯ̈̀.ɲ̟ì)]) was a province of Japan comprising modern-day Yamagata Prefecture and Akita Prefecture, except for the city of Kazuno and the town of Kosaka. Dewa bordered on Mutsu and Echigō Provinces. Its abbreviated form name was Ushū (羽州).

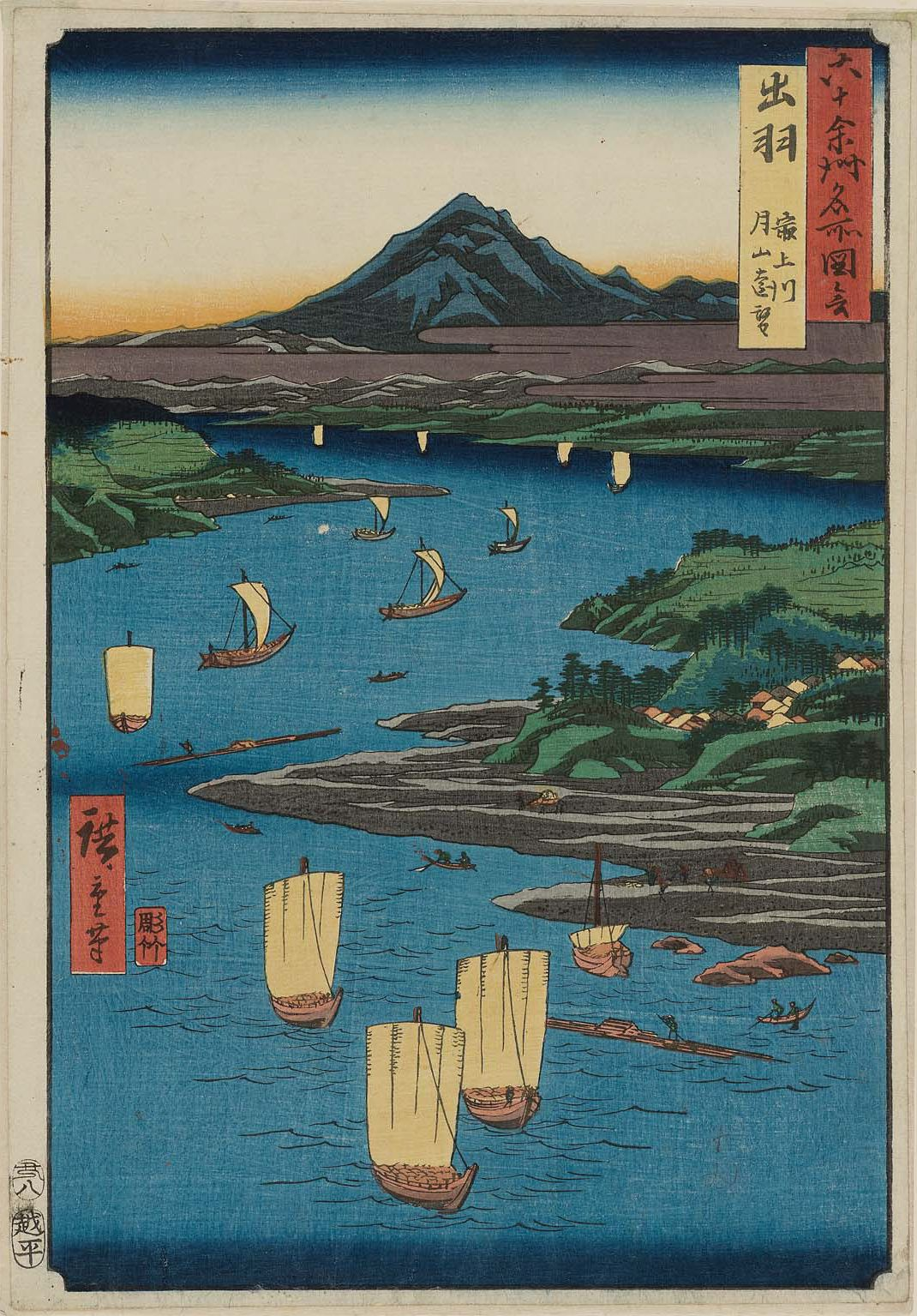
Hiroshige ukiyo-e "Dewa" in "The Famous Scenes of the Sixty States" (六十余州名所図会), depicting the Mogami River and Mount Gassan

== History ==
=== Early period ===
Prior to the Asuka period, Dewa was inhabited by Ainu or Emishi tribes, and was effectively outside of the control of the imperial dynasty. Abe no Hirafu conquered the native Emishi tribes at what are now the cities of Akita and Noshiro in 658 and established a fort on the Mogami River. In 708 AD Dewa District (出羽郡, Dewa-gun) was created within Echigō Province. The area of Dewa District was roughly that of the modern Shōnai area of Yamagata Prefecture, and was gradually extended to the north as the Japanese pushed back the indigenous people of northern Honshū. Dewa District was promoted to the status of a province (Dewa Province (出羽国, Dewa no kuni)) in 712 AD, and gained Okitama and Mogami Districts, formerly part of Mutsu Province.

A number of military expeditions were sent to the area, with armed colonists forming settlements with wooden palisades across central Dewa in what is now the Shōnai area of Yamagata Prefecture. The capital of the new province was initially established at Dewanosaku (出羽柵), a fortified settlement in what is now part of Sakata, Yamagata, which served as a vital military stronghold in the expansion of Yamato control and settlement in the region. In 733, the capital was moved north, and a new military settlement, later named "Akita Castle", was built what is now in the Takashimizu area of the city of Akita. Abe no Yakamaro was sent as Chinjufu-shōgun. In 737, a major military operation began to connect Akita Castle with Taga Castle on the Pacific Coast. Over the next 50 years, additional fortifications were erected at Okachi in Dewa Province and Monofu in Mutsu Province involving a force of over 5000 men. The road was greatly resented by the Emishi tribes, and after an uprising in 767, pacification expeditions were carried out in 776, 778, 794, 801 and 811.

During the Nara period, under the Engishiki classification system, Dewa was ranked as a "greater country" (上国). Under the ritsuryō system, Dewa was classed as a "far country" (遠国). The name of the province was originally pronounced "Idewa". The Ichinomiya of Dewa Province was the Chōkaisan Ōmonoimi Shrine in what is now Yuza, Yamagata.

During the Heian period, in 878, a major rebellion known as the Gangyo Disturbance (元慶の乱, Gangyo no ran) erupted in the region against Yamato rule. Another major uprising occurred in 939, as part of East Japan war Tengyō no Ran. Towards the end of the Heian period, the province was organized into eleven districts. It was later a battleground in the Gosannen War and the Former Nine Years War.

=== Medieval period ===
Following the destruction of the Northern Fujiwara clan by the forces of the Kamakura shogunate in 1189, many Fujiwara partisans fled to the mountains of Dewa and continued to resist central authority. The area was divided into numerous shōen during the Kamakura period, which developed into the centers of numerous rival samurai clans. In 1335, Shiba Kaneyori received the Dewa Province as a fief from Ashikaga Takauji, but ruled it only in name. By the end of the Sengoku period, the Mogami clan had emerged as the strongest local force in the southern portion of the province, whereas the Akita clan dominated the northern portion of the province. Both clans sided with Tokugawa Ieyasu at the Battle of Sekigahara, and were thus secured in their holdings at the start of the Tokugawa shogunate.

=== Early modern period ===
During the early Edo period, both the Mogami and the Akita were dispossessed, and their territories broken up into smaller domains, the largest of which were held by the Sakai clan and Uesugi clans. During the Bakumatsu period, all of the domains in the area joined the Ōuetsu Reppan Dōmei supporting the Tokugawa shogunate. Following the defeat of the pro-Tokugawa forces, the new Meiji government reorganized Dewa province into Ugo Province (羽後国) in the north, and Uzen Province (羽前国) in the south in 1868.These provinces became Akita Prefecture and Yamagata Prefecture on August 2, 1876.

== Historical districts ==
- Ugo Province
  - Akumi District (飽海郡)
  - Akita District (秋田郡)
  - Hiraka District (平鹿郡)
  - Kawabe District (河辺郡)
  - Ogachi District (雄勝郡)
  - Semboku District (仙北郡)
  - Yamamoto District (山本郡)
  - Yuri District (由利郡)
- Uzen Province
  - Kubiki District (櫛引郡)
  - Mogami District (最上郡)
  - Murayama District (村山郡)
  - Okitama District (置賜郡)
  - Tagawa District (田川郡) (former Dewa District (出羽郡))

== Bakumatsu period domains ==
Name	type	daimyo	kokudaka	notes
Kubota Domain	tozama	Satake	205,000 koku	also known as Akita Domain
Kameda Domain	tozama	Iwaki	20,000 koku	
Honjō Domain	tozama	Rokugō	20,000 koku	
Shōnai-Matsuyama Domain	fudai	Sakai	20,000 koku	sub of Shōnai Domain
Shōnai Domain	fudai	Sakai	170,000 koku	also known as Tsuruoka Domain
Yamagata Domain	fudai	Mizuno	50,000 koku	
Kaminoyama Domain	fudai	Matsudaira (Fujii)	30,000 koku	
Tendō Domain	tozama	Oda	20,000 koku	
Nagatoro Domain	fudai	Yonekitsu	10,000 koku	
Yonezawa Domain	tozama	Uesugi	167,000 koku	
Kubota Shinden Domain	tozama	Satake	20,000 koku	sub of Kubota Domain
Yonezawa Shinden Domain	tozama	Uesugi	10,000 koku	sub of Yonezawa domain
Shinjō Domain	fudai	Tozawa	68,800 koku	

== Highways ==
- Ushū Kaidō – a subroute of the Ōshū Kaidō and Sendaidō with 57 post stations connecting what is now Koori, Fukushima with Aomori
- Yonezawa Kaidō – connecting what is now Aizuwakamatsu, Fukushima with Yamagata.
- Sendai Kaidō – connecting what is now Sakata, Yamagata with Sendai.
- Ushū Hamakaidō – connecting Sakata with Niigata.
