= Sakigake Yabase Baseball Stadium =

Stadium in Akita, Japan

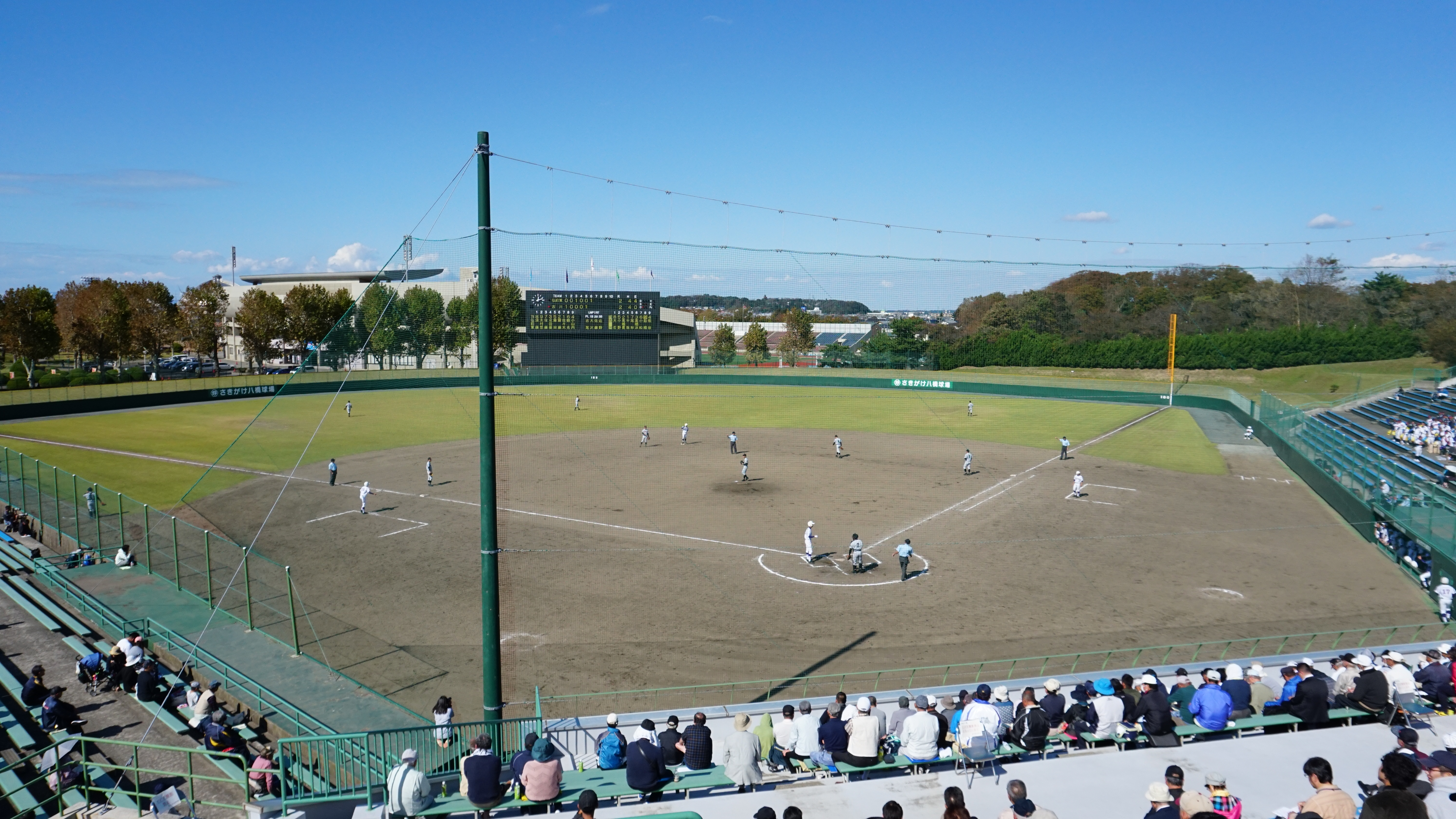
- Interactive map of Sakigake Yabase Baseball Stadium
- Full name: Akita City Yabase Sports Park Baseball Stadium
- Location: Akita, Akita, Japan
- Coordinates: 39°43′11.9″N 140°5′49.3″E
- Owner: Akita city
- Capacity: 16,421
- Surface: Grass
- Field size: Left Field – 100 m (330 ft); Center Field – 122 m (400 ft); Right Field – 100 m (330 ft)

Construction
- Opened: September 23, 1941
- Renovated: 1962, 1982, 1990, 2006

Website
- https://www.city.akita.lg.jp/shisetsu/sports-koen/1009703/1008152.html

The Sakigake Yabase Baseball Stadium (さきがけ八橋球場, Sakigake Yabase Kyujo) (official name: Akita City Yabase Sports Park Baseball Stadium) is a stadium in Akita, Akita, Japan.

== Famous incident ==
Jim Traber of Kintetsu Buffaloes was ejected on May 19, 1991.

== Gallery ==
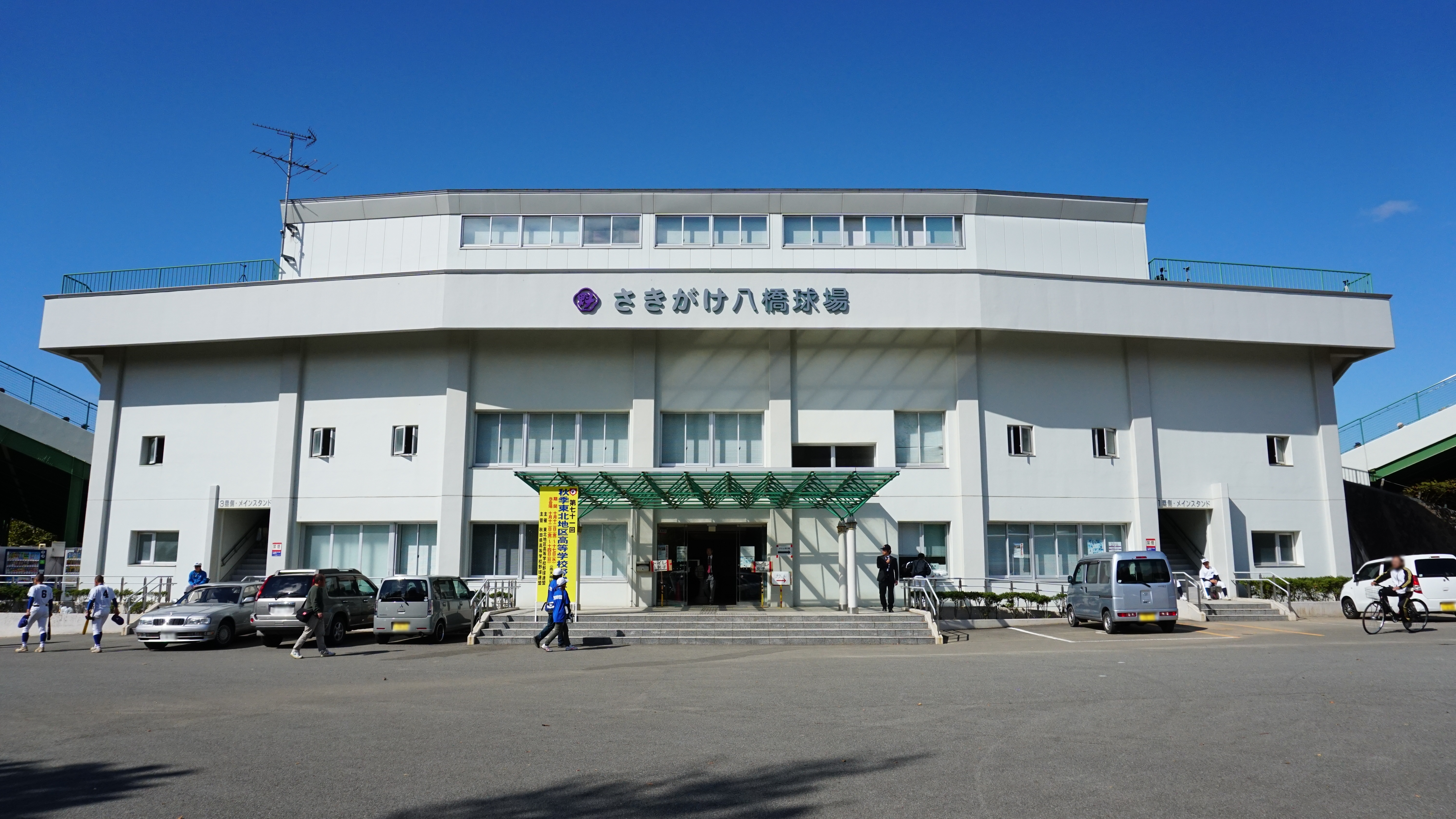
Front view

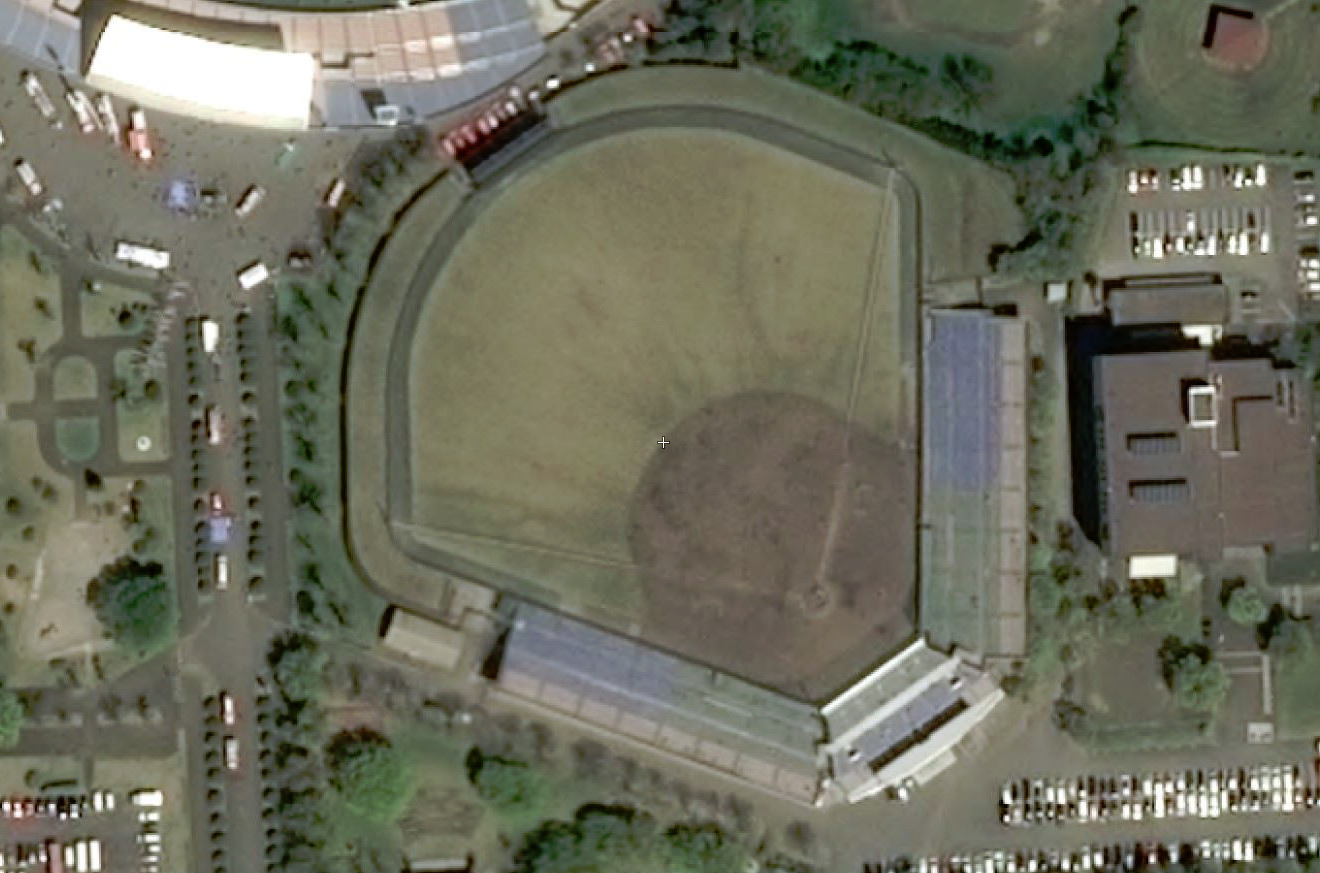
Satellite view in 2019

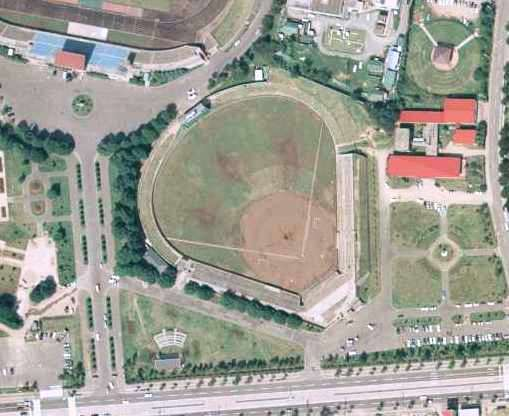
1975

== Location map ==
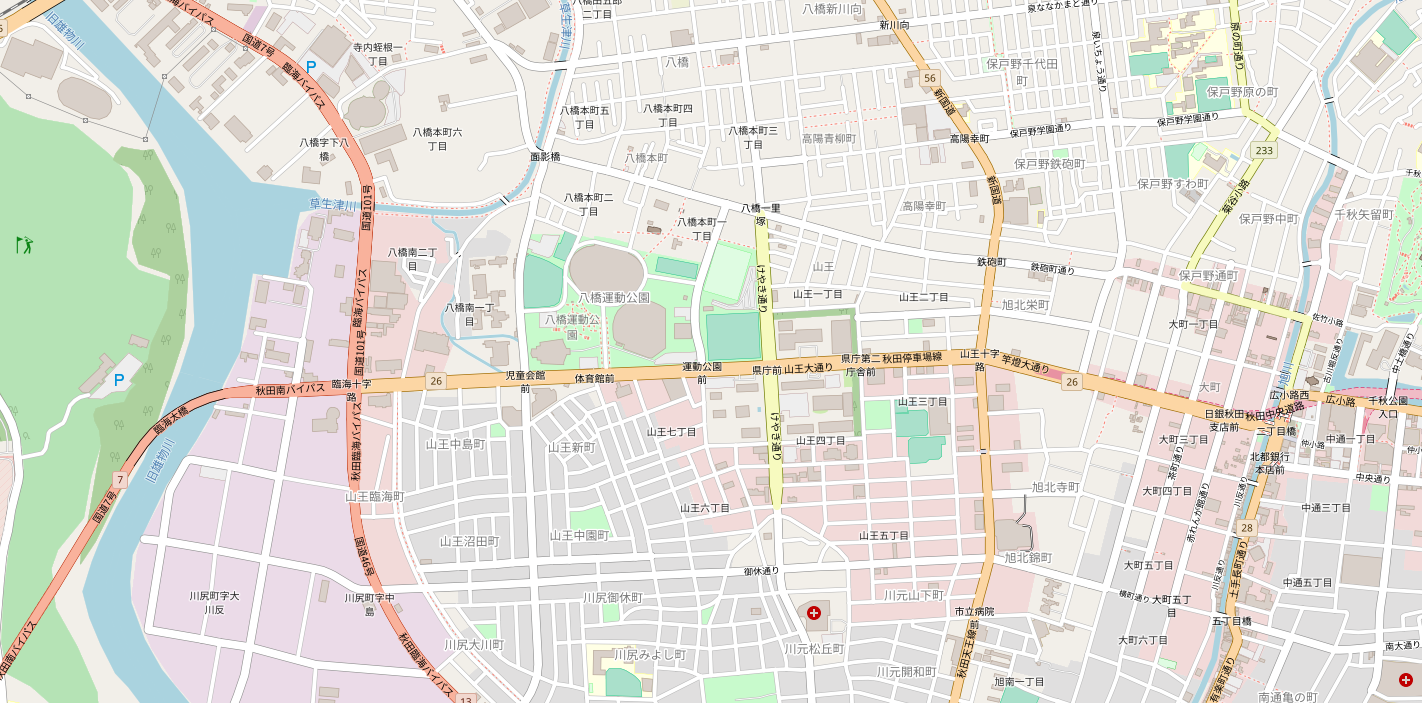
Yabase Baseball Stadium (Akita, Akita)
