= Jizōden =

Yayoi period archaeological site in Akita, Tōhoku, Japan

Jizōden ruins
- 地蔵田遺跡 (Japanese)
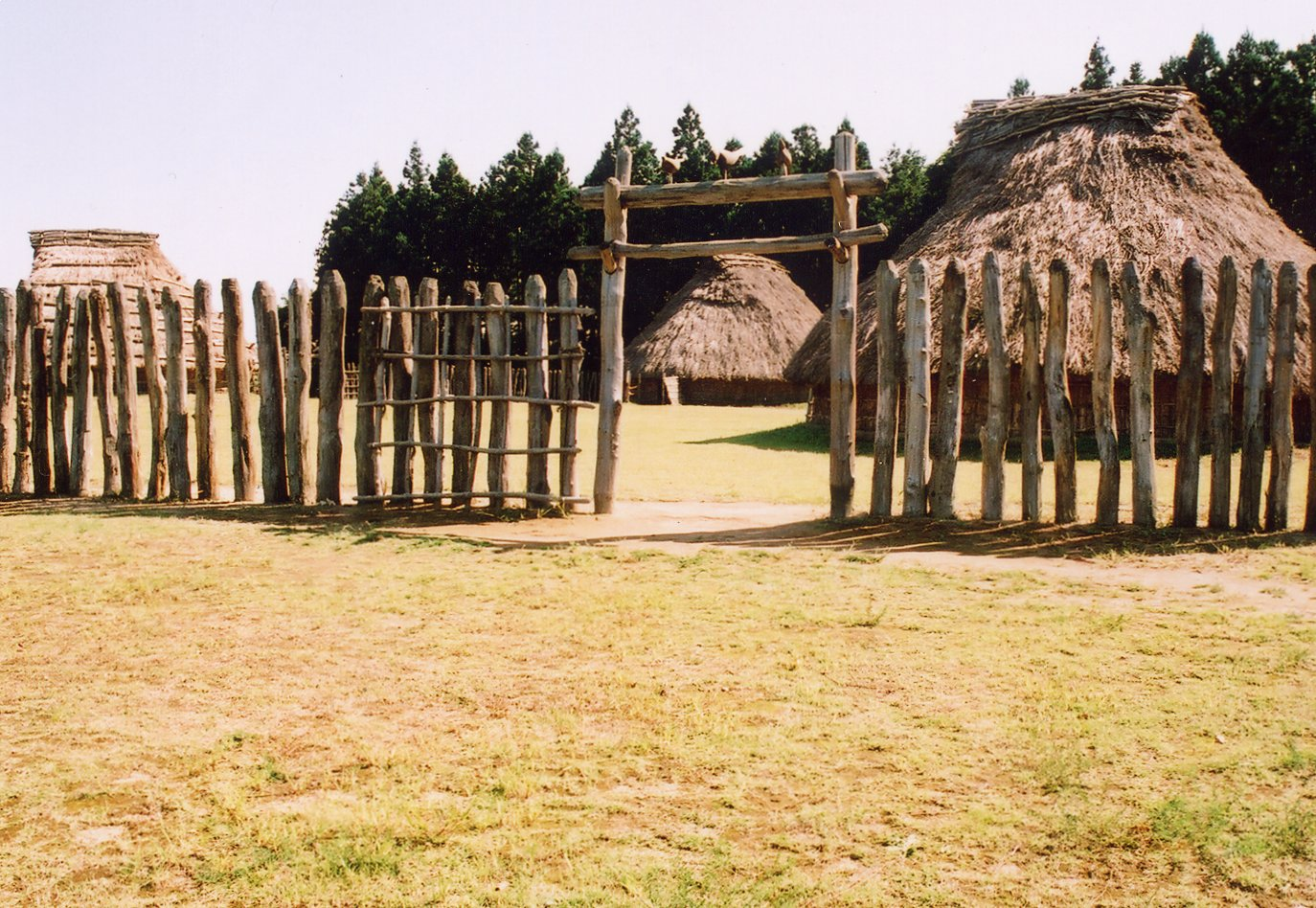
- Jizōden ruins

- Jizōden ruins Jizōden (Japan)
- Interactive map of Jizōden ruins
- 39°39′28″N 140°09′26″E
- Type: settlement
- Periods: Yayoi period
- Location: Akita, Japan
- Region: Tōhoku region

Site notes
- Excavation dates: 1985 to 1986
- Discovered: 1981
- Public access: Yes (archaeological park)

The Jizōden ruins (地蔵田遺跡, Jizōden iseki) is an archaeological site containing the ruins of a large-scale Yayoi period settlement located in the Goshono neighborhood of the city of Akita in the Tōhoku region of Japan. It also contains artifacts from the Jōmon period and the Japanese Paleolithic periods. The site was designated a National Historic Site of Japan on 6 November 1996. The site is currently maintained as an archaeological park with some reconstructed buildings.

== Overview ==
The Goshonō Plateau is a large plateau in the center of the Akita Plain, in the southeastern part of Akita City, at the confluence of the Omono River and its tributary the Iwami River. Since the 1970s, a new town named the “Akita New Urban Development Project” was launched on approximately 380 hectares of this plateau area. Since construction began in 1981, 31 ruins were located, and an emergency excavation was performed by the Akita City Board of Education. Ruins from the Japanese Paleolithic period, Jōmon period, Yayoi period, and Heian period have been confirmed on the site. The Jizōden ruins is one of these sites identified in this excavation, and the portion covered by the National Historic Site designation was initially labelled the “Jizōden B ruins”. Approximately 12,000 square meters were excavated in detail from 1985 to 1986.

This Yayoi period settlement is unique in eastern Japan in that the entire residential area was surrounded by a double wooden palisade, making it a fortified settlement. The palisade is made with logs having a diameter of 20–30 cm, closely arranged. The inner palisade is oval with a major axis of 61 meters and a minor axis of 47 meters and the outer has a major axis of 64 meters and minor axis of 50 meters. The main entrance appears to have been to the northwest, although the fence is broken to the west, south, east and southeast, indicating the possibility of other entrances. The southeast gap leads to the cemetery area. Outside the settlement area to the east were six large pillars, whose purpose is unknown.

The foundations of three circular pit dwellings were found within the residential area, each with a diameter of 8 to 9.1 meters, which is generally larger than normal for Yayoi period dwellings. Houses were built surrounding a central plaza. The buildings had been rebuilt on several occasions, perhaps more than six times, and towards the end of the Yayoi period, the palisade had been removed, and the dwellings expanded to 9 to 13 meters in diameter.

Outside the palisade was a midden and a cemetery site containing 25 graves in five types of earthenware tombs and 51 earthen burials. No human remains were recovered.

A large quantity of artifacts was discovered in the settlement area, including cylindrical and round beads made of tuff, jadeite and other materials, magatama made of chalcedony, red ochre, stone axes, clay figurines, spindle wheels and earthenware pottery shards. A great interest was a number of bowl-shaped Yayoi pottery used for pots known as "Onga River type", which was common in early Yayoi period pottery found in western Japan in the 3rd century BC. Its presence at this site raises the possibility that the settlement was populated by a people with a rice-cultivation culture who migrated to this location from western Japan.

The site is approximately 2.8 kilometers east of Yotsugoya Station on the JR East Ōu Main Line.

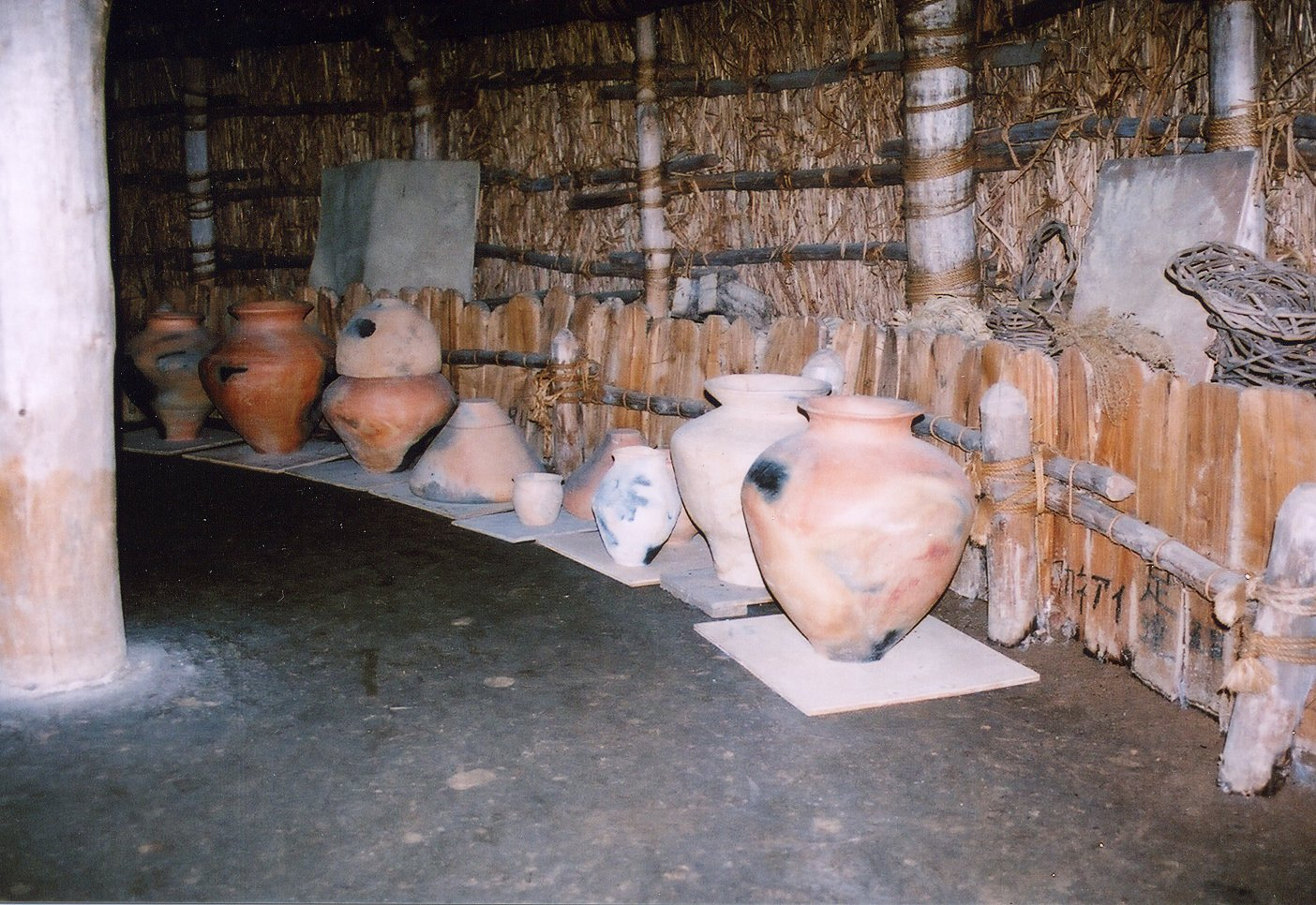
Inside reconstructed pit dwelling with examples of Onga River type Yayoi pottery

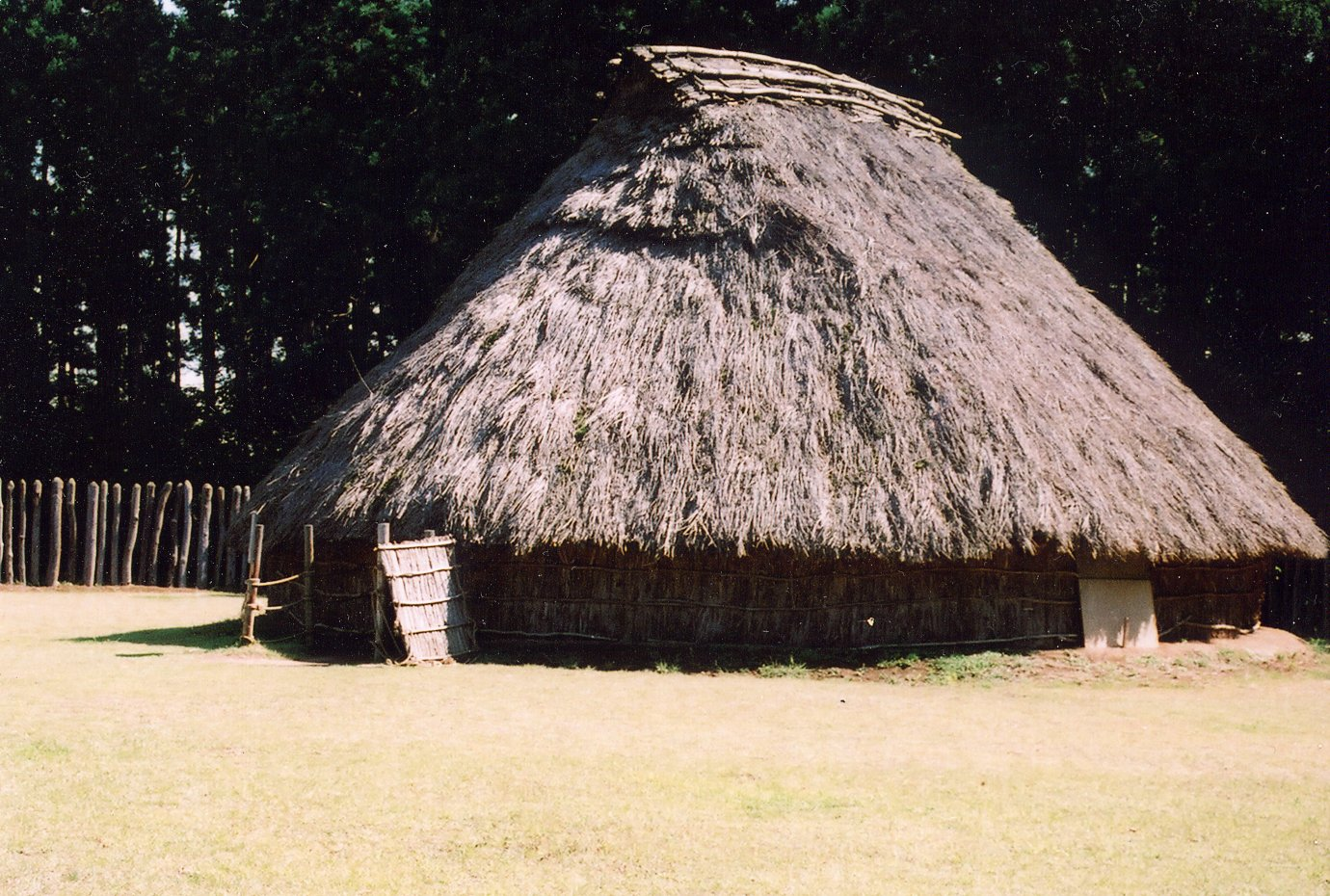
Reconstructed pit dwelling

== Japanese Paleolithic ==
Paleolithic artifacts have been found to the east of the Yayoi period settlement. These artifacts have attracted attention among researchers as representative examples of the late Paleolithic stone groups in the Tōhoku region. The total number of Paleolithic artifacts found came to 4,447 items, which included four polished stone axes, five stone knives, 22 smaller stone knives, 39 trapezoidal stone tools, eight side scrapers, four end scrapers, seven saw-tooth tools, 71 lithic cores and many lithic flakes from stone processing. About 99% of these stone tools are made from siliceous shale, shedding light on the details of the flake production technology. Based on these materials of the Jizōden site is considered to have been inhabited from first half of the Late Paleolithic period, or 33,000 to 35,000 years ago.

== See also ==
- List of Historic Sites of Japan (Akita)
