= Akita Community Broadcasting =

Akita Community Broadcasting (JOZZ2AM-FM)
- Akita; Japan
- Frequency: 76.5 MHz

Programming
- Language: Japanese
- Format: Music/Talk

History
- First air date: December 1, 1998

Technical information
- Power: 20 watts
- ERP: 30 watts
- Transmitter coordinates: 39°42′15.3″N 140°07′50.4″E

Links
- Website: Official website

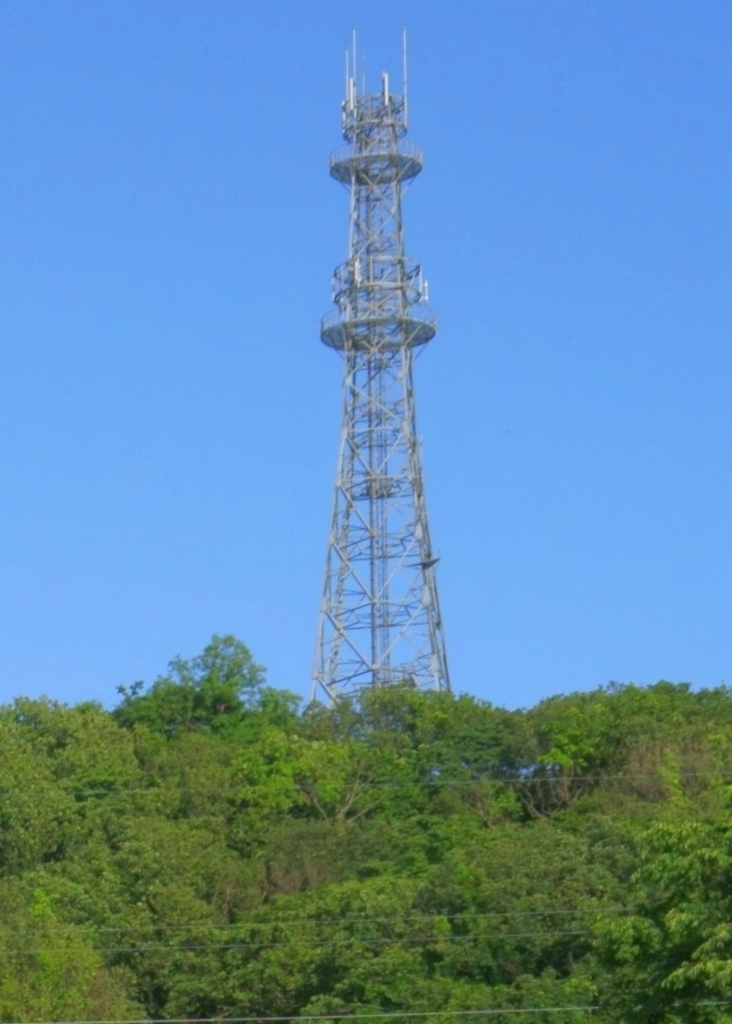
Kinshojiyama Transmitter

Akita Community Broadcasting Ltd. (秋田コミュニティー放送株式会社, Akita Komyuniti Hoso Kabushiki-gaisha) is a Japanese FM station that is based in Akita, Japan.

== Location map ==
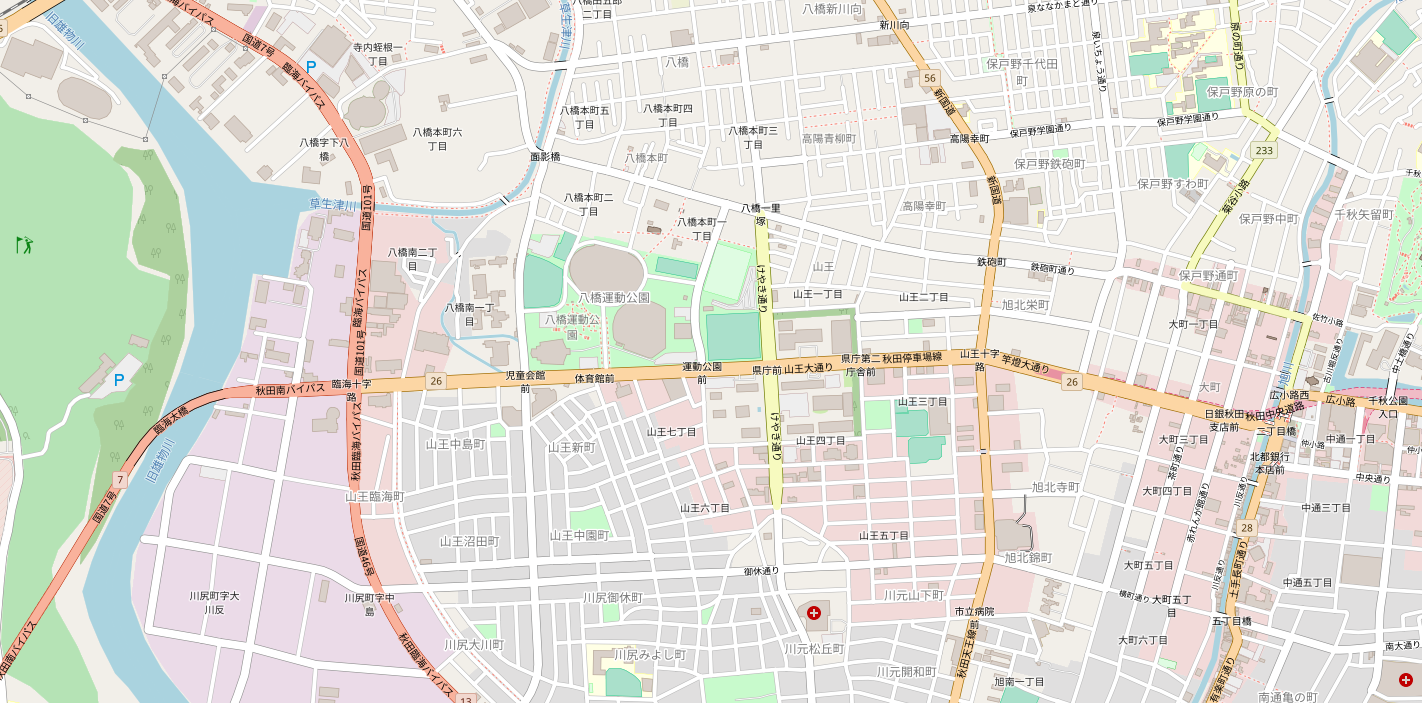
