= Akita Thermal Power Station =

Power station in Akita, Japan

Akita Thermal Power Station 秋田火力発電所
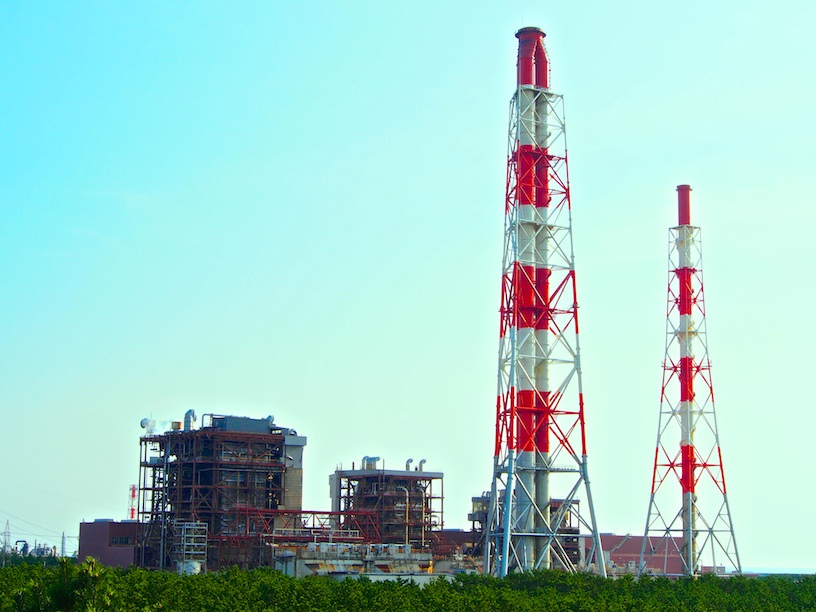
- Akita Thermal Power Station
- Country: Japan Akita Prefecture#Japan
- Location: Akita, Akita Prefecture, Japan
- Coordinates: 39°47′01″N 140°02′55″E
- Status: Operational
- Commission date: 1970
- Owner: Tohoku Electric
- Operator: Tohoku Electric Power

Thermal power station
- Primary fuel: Heavy Oil / Crude Oil

Power generation
- Units operational: 2
- Units under const.: 3
- Nameplate capacity: 950 MW

External links
- Commons: Related media on Commons

Akita Thermal Power Station (秋田火力発電所, Akita Karyoku Hatsudensho) is an oil-fired thermal power station operated by Tohoku Electric in the city of Akita, Akita, Japan. The facility is located overlooking the Oga Peninsula on the Sea of Japan coast of Honshu. It also conducts remote monitoring of the four geothermal power plants Tohokou Electric operates.

== History ==
The Akita Thermal Power Station was built to provide baseline power to the Tohoku region of Japan, including Akita Prefecture. Unit 1 came online in August 1970, followed by Unit 2 in February 1972, Unit 3 in November 1974 and Unit 4 in July 1980.

Due to aging equipment and a decline in demand, Unit 1 was scrapped in December 2003. Unit 3 was likewise abolished in September 2019. Unit 2 has been taken offline for maintenance, but is not expected to restart. The remaining Unit 4 is also in the process of being phased out.

Due to damage to the nationwide grid caused by the 2011 Tōhoku earthquake and tsunami, an emergency Unit 5 was rushed into operation in 2012. This unit was originally scheduled to be abolished in September 2018; however, due to unusually severe winter conditions and greater-than-anticipated demand, it was kept on line to March 2019. After it was scrapped, the gas turbine used at this plant was sent to be installed at the Higashi Niigata Thermal Power Station, Unit 4–1.

== Plant details ==
Unit	Fuel	Type	Capacity	On line	Status
1	Crude Oil, Heavy Oil	Steam turbine	350 MW	1970	Scrapped 2003
2	Crude Oil, Heavy Oil	Steam turbine	350 MW	1972	Offline
3	Crude Oil, Heavy Oil	Steam turbine	350 MW	1974	Scrapped 2019
4	Crude Oil, Heavy Oil	Steam turbine	600 MW	1980	Scrapped 2024
5	Light Oil	Gas turbine	3.33 MW	2012	Scrapped 2019

== See also ==
- Energy in Japan
- List of power stations in Japan
