= Ren Yamamoto (footballer, born 1999) =

Japanese footballer

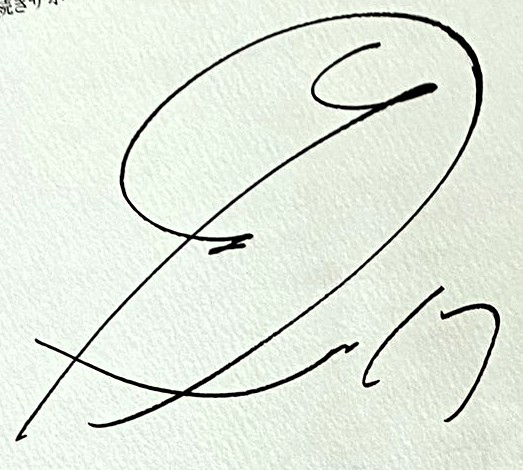

Personal information
- Date of birth: 8 May 1999 (age 27)
- Place of birth: Araya, Akita, Akita, Japan
- Height: 1.80 m (5 ft 11 in)
- Position: Midfielder

Team information
- Current team: Tochigi SC
- Number: 17

Youth career
- Nisshin SSS
- Blaublitz Akita
- 2015–2017: Tochigi SC

Senior career*
Years	Team	Apps	(Gls)
2018–	Tochigi SC	71	(3)
2018	→ Blancdieu Hirosaki (loan)	14	(1)
2019	→ Arterivo Wakayama (loan)	13	(0)
- * Club domestic league appearances and goals as of 3 December 2022

Ren Yamamoto (山本 廉, Yamamoto Ren; born 8 May 1999) is a Japanese footballer currently playing as a midfielder for Tochigi SC.

== Career statistics ==
=== Club ===
As of 3 December 2022.

Club	Season	League			National Cup		League Cup		Other		Total	
Club	Season	Division	Apps	Goals	Apps	Goals	Apps	Goals	Apps	Goals	Apps	Goals
Tochigi SC	2018	J2 League	0	0	0	0	–		0	0	0	0
Tochigi SC	2019	J2 League	0	0	0	0	–		0	0	0	0
Tochigi SC	2020	J2 League	31	2	0	0	–		0	0	31	2
Tochigi SC	2021	J2 League	25	1	1	0	–		0	0	26	1
Tochigi SC	2022	J2 League	15	0	2	0	–		0	0	17	0
Tochigi SC	Total		71	3	3	0	0	0	0	0	74	3
Blancdieu Hirosaki (loan)	2018	Tohoku Soccer League	14	1	0	0	–		3 (Note: Appearance(s) in the Japanese Regional Football League Competition)	0	17	1
Arterivo Wakayama (loan)	2019	Kansai Soccer League	13	0	2 (Note: Appearance(s) in the Emperor's Cup)	0	–		0	0	15	0
Career total			98	4	5	0	0	0	3	0	106	4
