= Michio Ashikaga =

Japanese footballer

Michio Ashikaga 足利 道夫
Personal information
- Full name: Michio Ashikaga
- Date of birth: May 22, 1950 (age 76)
- Place of birth: Kawabe, Akita, Japan
- Height: 1.75 m (5 ft 9 in)
- Position: Midfielder

Youth career
- 1966–1968: Akita Commercial High School

Senior career*
Years	Team	Apps	(Gls)
1969–1978	Mitsubishi Motors	132	(36)
Total		132	(36)

International career
1971–1975	Japan	7	(0)
Medal record
Mitsubishi Motors
Winner	Japan Soccer League	1969
Winner	Japan Soccer League	1973
Winner	Japan Soccer League	1978
Runner-up	Japan Soccer League	1970
Runner-up	Japan Soccer League	1971
Runner-up	Japan Soccer League	1974
Runner-up	Japan Soccer League	1975
Runner-up	Japan Soccer League	1976
Runner-up	Japan Soccer League	1977
Winner	JSL Cup	1978
Winner	Emperor's Cup	1971
Winner	Emperor's Cup	1973
Winner	Emperor's Cup	1978
- * Club domestic league appearances and goals

Michio Ashikaga (足利 道夫, Ashikaga Michio; born May 22, 1950) is a former Japanese football player. He played for Japan national team.

== Club career ==
Ashikaga was born in Akita Prefecture on May 22, 1950. After graduating from high school, he joined Mitsubishi Motors in 1969. The club won the league champions in 1969, 1973 and 1978. The club also won 1971, 1973, 1978 Emperor's Cup and 1978 JSL Cup. He retired in 1978. He played 132 games and scored 36 goals in the league.

== National team career ==
In September 1971, Ashikaga was selected Japan national team for 1972 Summer Olympics qualification. At this qualification, on September 23, he debuted against Malaysia. He also played at 1974 World Cup qualification. He played 7 games for Japan until 1975.

== Club statistics ==
Club performance			League	
Season	Club	League	Apps	Goals
Japan			League	
1969	Mitsubishi Motors	JSL Division 1	5	3
1970	Mitsubishi Motors	JSL Division 1	12	2
1971	Mitsubishi Motors	JSL Division 1	13	4
1972	Mitsubishi Motors	JSL Division 1	14	3
1973	Mitsubishi Motors	JSL Division 1	18	8
1974	Mitsubishi Motors	JSL Division 1	18	5
1975	Mitsubishi Motors	JSL Division 1	18	1
1976	Mitsubishi Motors	JSL Division 1	17	4
1977	Mitsubishi Motors	JSL Division 1	17	6
1978	Mitsubishi Motors	JSL Division 1	0	0
Total			132	36

== National team statistics ==
Japan national team
Year	Apps	Goals
1971	1	0
1972	3	0
1973	2	0
1974	0	0
1975	1	0
Total	7	0
