= Kawabe, Akita =

Dissolved municipality in Akita prefecture, Japan

Flag

Chapter seal/emblem

Kawabe (Japanese: 河辺町, Hepburn: Kawabe-machi) was a town located in Kawabe District, Akita Prefecture, Japan.

As of 2003, the town had an estimated population of 10,366 and a density of 34.43 persons per km^{2}. The total area was 301.06 km^{2}.

On January 11, 2005, Kawabe, along with the town of Yūwa, was merged into the expanded city of Akita and no longer exists as an independent municipality.

== Notable people ==
- Michio Ashikaga (footballer)
- Mitsuhisa Taguchi (footballer)
