= Yūwa, Akita =

Yūwa 雄和町
- Former settlement
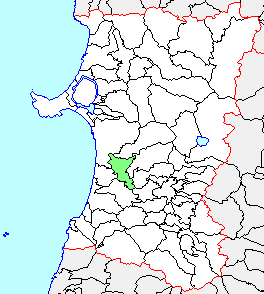
- Interactive map of Yūwa
- Country: Japan
- Prefecture: Akita
- District: Kawabe
- Climate: Cfa

Yūwa (雄和町, Yūwa-machi) was a town located in Kawabe District, Akita Prefecture, Japan.

As of 2003, the town had an estimated population of 7,898 and a density of 54.65 persons per km^{2}. The total area was 144.51 km^{2}.

On January 11, 2005, Yūwa, along with the town of Kawabe, was merged into the expanded city of Akita and no longer exists as an independent municipality.

== Climate ==
Climate data for Yūwa, Akita (2003−2020 normals, extremes 2003−present)
| Month | Jan | Feb | Mar | Apr | May | Jun | Jul | Aug | Sep | Oct | Nov | Dec | Year |
|---|---|---|---|---|---|---|---|---|---|---|---|---|---|
| Record high °C (°F) | 9.8 (49.6) | 17.0 (62.6) | 20.3 (68.5) | 29.1 (84.4) | 31.4 (88.5) | 33.3 (91.9) | 35.3 (95.5) | 36.7 (98.1) | 34.8 (94.6) | 28.8 (83.8) | 24.3 (75.7) | 14.9 (58.8) | 36.7 (98.1) |
| Mean daily maximum °C (°F) | 1.7 (35.1) | 2.9 (37.2) | 7.1 (44.8) | 13.4 (56.1) | 19.8 (67.6) | 23.8 (74.8) | 26.8 (80.2) | 28.7 (83.7) | 24.8 (76.6) | 18.2 (64.8) | 11.4 (52.5) | 4.4 (39.9) | 15.3 (59.4) |
| Daily mean °C (°F) | −0.9 (30.4) | −0.5 (31.1) | 2.9 (37.2) | 8.4 (47.1) | 14.6 (58.3) | 18.9 (66.0) | 22.5 (72.5) | 24.1 (75.4) | 19.8 (67.6) | 13.2 (55.8) | 7.1 (44.8) | 1.5 (34.7) | 11.0 (51.7) |
| Mean daily minimum °C (°F) | −3.6 (25.5) | −3.8 (25.2) | −1.0 (30.2) | 3.4 (38.1) | 9.7 (49.5) | 14.7 (58.5) | 19.2 (66.6) | 20.3 (68.5) | 15.8 (60.4) | 8.9 (48.0) | 3.3 (37.9) | −1.2 (29.8) | 7.1 (44.8) |
| Record low °C (°F) | −13.0 (8.6) | −12.9 (8.8) | −9.2 (15.4) | −4.2 (24.4) | 1.1 (34.0) | 6.1 (43.0) | 13.0 (55.4) | 12.2 (54.0) | 6.1 (43.0) | 0.8 (33.4) | −4.3 (24.3) | −9.6 (14.7) | −13.0 (8.6) |
| Average precipitation mm (inches) | 120.1 (4.73) | 97.0 (3.82) | 105.9 (4.17) | 118.6 (4.67) | 117.0 (4.61) | 133.0 (5.24) | 225.7 (8.89) | 207.2 (8.16) | 176.3 (6.94) | 184.8 (7.28) | 205.7 (8.10) | 170.7 (6.72) | 1,862 (73.31) |
| Average snowfall cm (inches) | 77 (30) | 75 (30) | 7 (2.8) | 3 (1.2) | 0 (0) | 0 (0) | 0 (0) | 0 (0) | 0 (0) | 0 (0) | 4 (1.6) | 65 (26) | 230 (91) |
| Average precipitation days (≥ 1.0 mm) | 21.4 | 16.7 | 15.4 | 12.9 | 11.2 | 9.7 | 12.9 | 10.8 | 13.7 | 14.4 | 18.6 | 23.3 | 181 |
| Average snowy days (≥ 1 cm) | 9.5 | 8.0 | 1.0 | 0.5 | 0 | 0 | 0 | 0 | 0 | 0 | 0.5 | 6.0 | 25.5 |
Source: JMA
