= Kawabe District, Akita =

Former district in Japan

Coordinates: 39°39′10″N 140°12′55″E

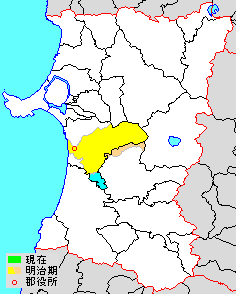
Location of former Kawabe District in Akita Prefecture; Yellow=original extent, Blue=portion annexed to Kawabe at a later date

Kawabe District (河辺郡, Kawabe-gun) was a rural district located in southern Akita, Japan. On October 1, 2005, its remaining components, the towns of Kawabe and Yūwa merged into the city of Akita, upon which Kawabe District was dissolved and ceased to exist as an administrative unit.

As of 2003 (before the merger), the district had an estimated population of 18,264 and a population density of 40.99 persons per km^{2}. The total area was 445.57 km^{2}.

== History ==
The area of Kawabe District was formerly part of Dewa Province, which was divided into the provinces of Ugo Province and Uzen Province following the Meiji restoration on January 19, 1869, with the area of Kawabe becoming part of Ugo Province. At the time, the area consisted of 59 villages all of which were formerly under the control of Kubota Domain. Akita Prefecture was founded on December 13, 1871.

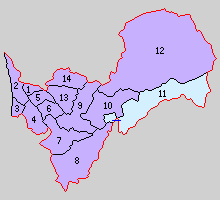
Historic Kawabe District – 1.Ushijima 2.Araya 3.Hamada 4.Toyoiwa 5. Niida 6.Yotsugoya 7.Kawazoe 8.Nakagawa 9.Toyoshima 10.Wada 11.Funaoka 12.Iwamisannai 13.Kami-Kitade 14.Shimo-Kitade Purple：Akita City Light Blue：to Daisen City

With the establishment of the municipality system on April 1, 1889, Kawabe District, with 14 villages was established. Ushijima and Araya were raised to town status in 1896, but Ushijima was annexed by the city of Akita in 1924. Wada was raised to town status in 1935, but Araya was absorbed into the city of Akita in 1941. On April 1, 1948 - Kawabe District acquired the village of Taishodera (from Yuri District).

Kawabe was raised to town status on March 31, 1955, followed by Yūwa on April 1, 1972. On January 11, 2005, the towns of Kawabe and Yūwa were merged into the expanded city of Akita. Kawabe District was dissolved as a result of this merger.

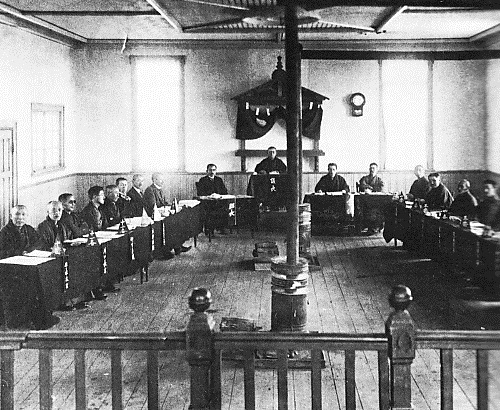
District assembly of Kawabe, Akita in 1923. All assemblies would be abolished by 1926.
