= Ugo Province =

Former province of Japan

Map of the former Japanese provinces with Ugo highlighted

Ugo Province (羽後国, Ugo no Kuni; Japanese pronunciation: [ɯ̈́.ɡò̞ (nò̞ kɯ̈̀.ɲ̟ì), -ŋò̞ (nò̞ kɯ̈̀.ɲ̟ì)]) is an old province of Japan in the area of Akita Prefecture and some parts of Yamagata Prefecture (specifically Akumi District). It was sometimes called Ushū (羽州), with Uzen Province.

== Historical districts ==
Ugo Province consisted of nine districts:

- Yamagata Prefecture
  - Akumi District (飽海郡)
- Akita Prefecture
  - Akita District (秋田郡)
    - Kitaakita District (北秋田郡)
    - Minamiakita District (南秋田郡)
  - Hiraka District (平鹿郡) - dissolved
  - Kawabe District (河辺郡) - dissolved
  - Ogachi District (雄勝郡)
  - Semboku District (仙北郡)
  - Yamamoto District (山本郡)
  - Yuri District (由利郡) - dissolved

== Other websites ==
Media related to Ugo Province at Wikimedia Commons

- Murdoch's map of provinces, 1903
