= Uzen Province =

Former province of Japan

Map of the former Japanese provinces with Uzen highlighted

Uzen Province (羽前国, Uzen no Kuni; Japanese pronunciation: [ɯ̈́.(d͡)zè̞ɴ̀, -(d͡)zè̞ǹ nò̞ kɯ̈̀.ɲ̟ì]) is an old province of Japan in the area of Yamagata Prefecture (consisting mostly minus Akumi District). It was sometimes called Ushū (羽州), with Ugo Province.

This province was in the Tōhoku region of Honshū island. It was the place where the Mogami clan was established.

== Historical districts ==
Uzen Province consisted of ten districts:

- Yamagata Prefecture
  - Mogami District (最上郡)
  - Murayama District (村山郡)
    - Higashimurayama District (東村山郡)
    - Kitamurayama District (北村山郡)
    - Minamimurayama District (南村山郡) - dissolved
    - Nishimurayama District (西村山郡)
  - Okitama District (置賜郡)
    - Higashiokitama District (東置賜郡)
    - Minamiokitama District (南置賜郡) - dissolved
    - Nishiokitama District (西置賜郡)
  - Tagawa District (田川郡)
    - Higashitagawa District (東田川郡)
    - Nishitagawa District (西田川郡) - dissolved

== Other websites ==
Media related to Uzen Province at Wikimedia Commons

- Murdoch's map of provinces, 1903
