= Joshitei =

Landscape garden in Akita, Japan

Former Akita Domain Satake Clan Villa Gardens (Joshitei)
- 旧秋田藩主佐竹氏別邸 (如斯亭)
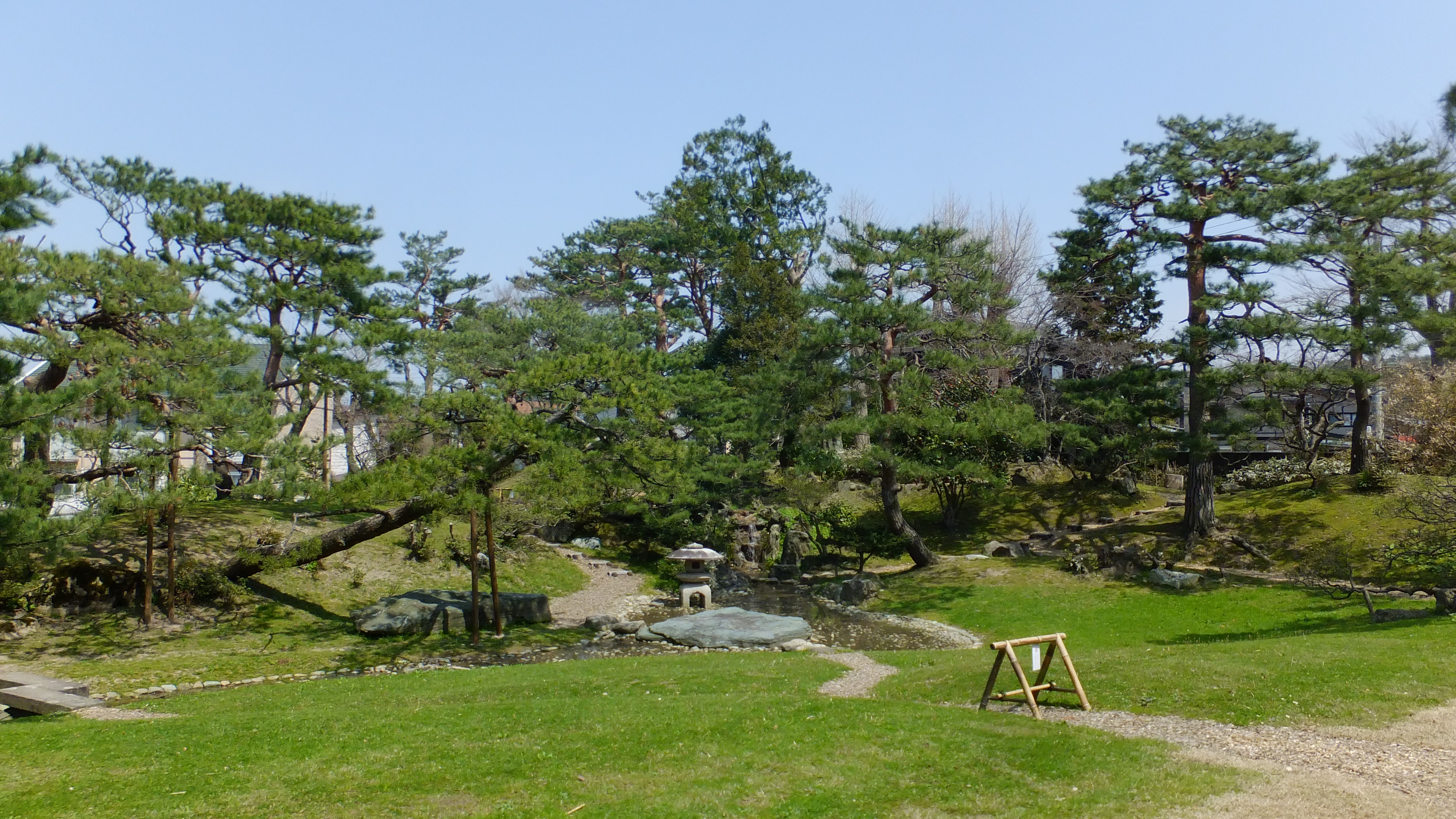
- Japanese style garden of the Joshitei in Akita city

- Location within Akita Prefecture Location within Japan
- Type: Urban park
- Location: Akita, Akita, Japan
- Coordinates: 39°44′03″N 140°07′45″E
- Created: 1688-1704
- Operator: Akita city
- Status: Open
- National Palace of Scenic Beauty

The Joshitei (如斯亭), also known as the Former Akita Domain Satake Clan Villa Gardens (旧秋田藩主佐竹氏別邸, kyū-Akita-han-shu Satake-shi bettei teien) is a Japanese landscape garden and nationally designated Place of Scenic Beauty in the city of Akita, Akita Prefecture, Japan.

== Overview ==
This garden was part of a secondary villa for the Satake clan, the daimyō of Kubota Domain during the Edo period. It is located approximately one kilometer north of Kubota Castle and is located on the left bank of Asahikawa River, which flows northeast from Akita City. The villa was originally built by a retainer of Kubota Domain, Ōshi Kosuke, on lands which had been granted to him by the 3rd daimyō Satake Yoshizumi during the Genroku era (1688-1704). It was frequented as a resting place for the 5th daimyō, Satake Yoshimine when he went hunting, and was thus presented back to the Satake clan as a gift. The gardens fell into disrepair due to lack of funds caused by the domains fiscal austerity measures, but were revived and remodeled by the 9th daimyō, Satake Yoshimasa with an arrangement of 15 viewpoints around a pond, megalithic stones, and Tōrō stone lanterns. It was used as a guesthouse for the Satake clan, and a place for literii to gather to write poetry and socialize. It is one of the oldest and largest in Enshū-style gardens in the Tōhoku region.

Following the Meiji restoration, the garden became the property of a former samurai clan, the Nawa, who sold it to the Marunouchi family in 1947. It was designated aa Prefectural Historic Site of Akita Prefecture in 1952. It was operated as a ryokan (Japanese-style inn) from 1964 to 1990. In 2007 it was designed as a National Place of Scenic Beauty. The Marunouchi family donated it to Akita City in 2010. Restoration work began in 2014 based on historical documents, and it was opened to the public in 2017.

The surrounding area used to be a quiet countryside, but today it is a densely populated residential area.

== Gallery ==
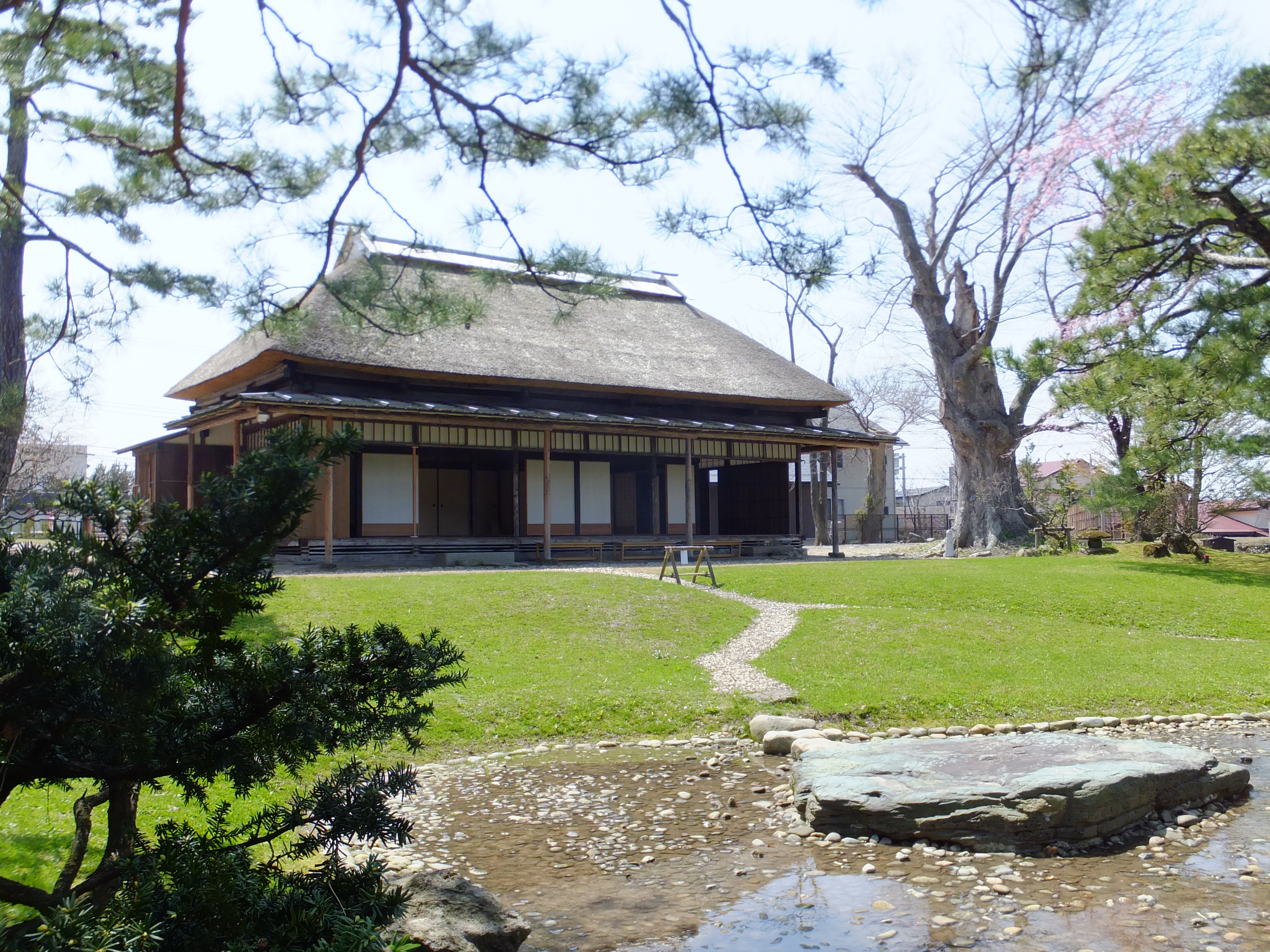
Main house of Joshitei

== See also ==
- List of Places of Scenic Beauty of Japan (Akita)
