= Satake Yoshimasa (daimyo, born 1775) =

- 佐竹義和
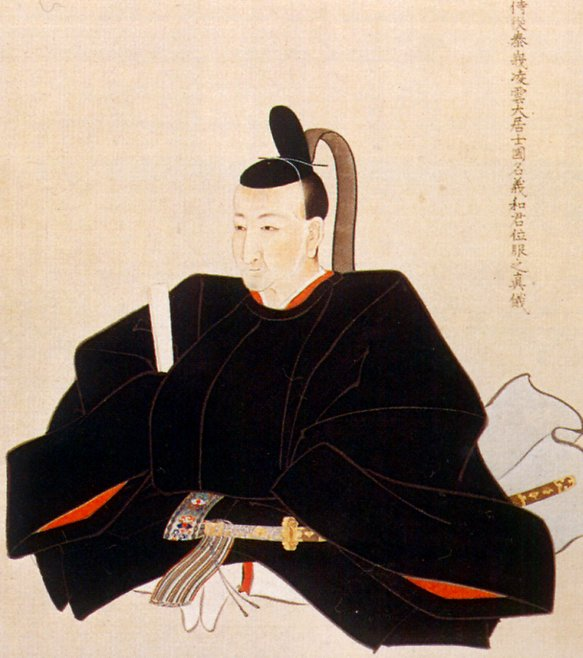
- Satake Yoshimasa, portrait at Tentoku-ji, Akita

9th Daimyō of Kubota Domain
- In office 1785–1815
- Monarchs: Shōgun: Tokugawa Ieharu; Tokugawa Ienari
- Preceded by: Satake Yoshiatsu
- Succeeded by: Satake Yoshihiro

Personal details
- Born: January 31, 1775
- Died: August 12, 1815 (aged 40) Kubota Castle, Akita, Japan
- Spouse: daughter of Hotta Masanari of Sakura Domain
- Parent: Satake Yoshiatsu (father)

Satake Yoshimasa (佐竹義和; January 31, 1775 – August 12, 1815) was the 9th daimyō of Kubota Domain in Dewa Province, Japan (modern-day Akita Prefecture), and then 27th hereditary chieftain of the Satake clan. His courtesy title was Ukyō-no-daifu and Jijū and his Court rank was Junior Fourth Rank, Lower Grade.

== Biography ==
Satake Yoshimasa was the eldest son of Satake Yoshiatsu. He was made heir in 1778 and became daimyō after his father died in 1785. He was received in a formal audience by Shōgun Tokugawa Ienari in 1788. In 1790, he established the domain academy Meitokukan, entering into his domain the same year. In 1791, he ordered the planting of extensive windbreaks to improve crop yields, and from 1792 also developed sericulture and lacquerware as industries to increase the revenues of the domain, bringing in experts from around the country. In 1793 he began a program to increase rice production by redeveloping unused land and seizing it from recalcitrant retainers when necessary. In 1795, he reformed the domain's system of local magistrates to remove incompetent or corrupt individuals. In 1805, he hired specialists in forestry management to develop timber as another resource for the domain.

In 1807, the Russian-American Company landed on Iturup island in the Kuriles, attacking the Japanese garrison. Kubota Domain was ordered to reinforce the defenses of Ezo and the northern islands and Yoshikazu sent a detachment of 600 men. The domain also established a trading post and attempted to establish trade with the local Ainu in 1814, but the venture was not an economic success. Yoshimasa died at Kubota Castle in 1815. A prolific poet and calligrapher, he left many works. He was married to a daughter of Hotta Masanari of Sakura Domain.

== See also ==
- Satake clan
