= Satake Yoshiharu =

Daimyo (1723–1758)

- 佐竹義明
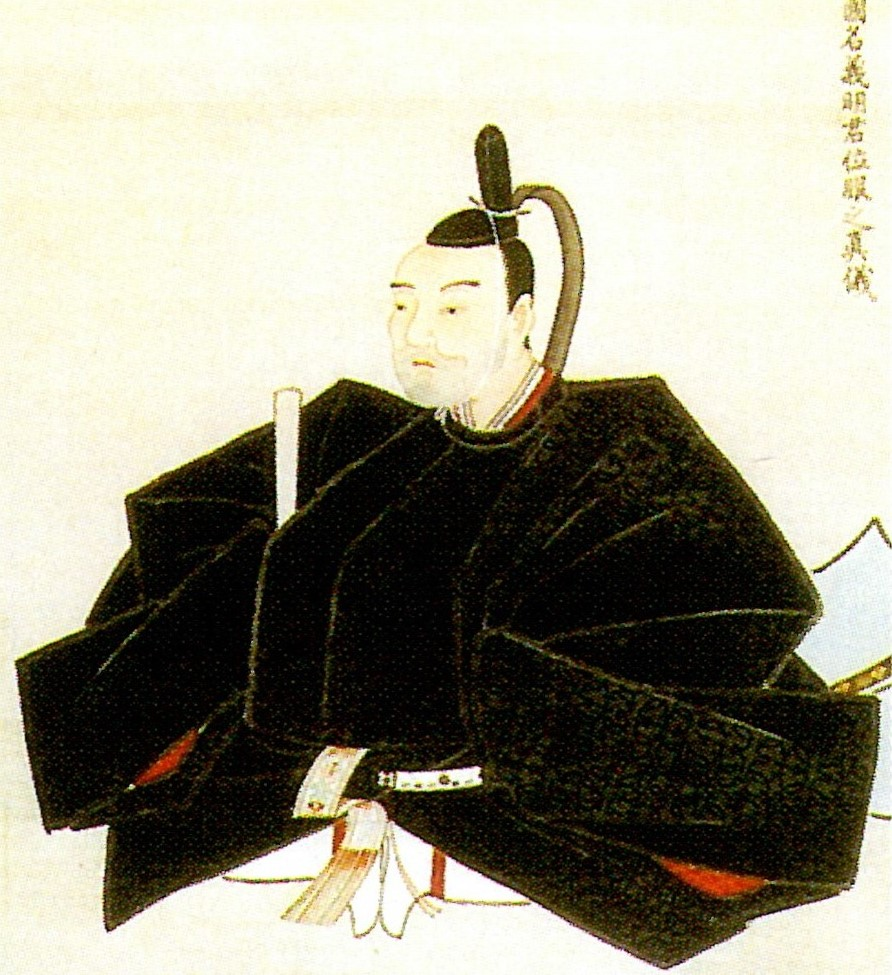
- Satake Yoshiharu, portrait at Tentoku-ji, Akita

7th Daimyō of Kubota Domain
- In office 1753–1758
- Monarch: Shōgun: Tokugawa Ieshige
- Preceded by: Satake Yoshimasa
- Succeeded by: Satake Yoshiatsu

Personal details
- Born: December 2, 1723
- Died: April 25, 1758 (aged 34); Kubota Castle, Akita, Japan
- Spouse: daughter of Satake Yoshimine
- Parent: Satake Yoshimichi (father)

Satake Yoshiharu (佐竹義明, December 2, 1723 – April 25, 1758) was the 7th daimyō of Kubota Domain in Dewa Province, Japan (modern-day Akita Prefecture), and then 25th hereditary chieftain of the Satake clan. His courtesy title was Ukyo-daifu and Jijū and his Court rank was Junior Fourth Rank, Lower Grade.

== Biography ==
Satake Yoshiharu was the eldest son of Satake Yoshimichi of Iwasaki Domain and was posthumously adopted as heir to Satake Yoshimasa after the latter's untimely death (possibly due to poison) in 1753. He was received in formal audience by Shōgun Tokugawa Yoshimune in 1737, and his position as daimyō of Kubota was confirmed by Shōgun Tokugawa Ieshige late in 1753. He made his first visit to his domain in 1755. Kubota Domain continued to be rent by peasant uprisings and by plots among his retainers caused by the years of mismanagement of the domain by his predecessors, complicated by a very severe crop failure in 1754. Yoshiharu attempted to reign in the economic situation by issuing hansatsu paper money with a face value in silver. However, the rice merchants, who were expecting the value of rice to increase due to the shortage, refused to accept the currency and insisted on silver coins instead. People who had the paper currency found it to be worthless, and this in turn led to the "Akita riot" of 1757, a large-scale uprising against the government. Yoshiharu died the following year at Kubota Castle at the suspiciously young age of 36.

== See also ==
- Satake clan
