= Satake Yoshimasa (daimyo, born 1728) =

It is about Satake Yoshimasa

- 佐竹義真
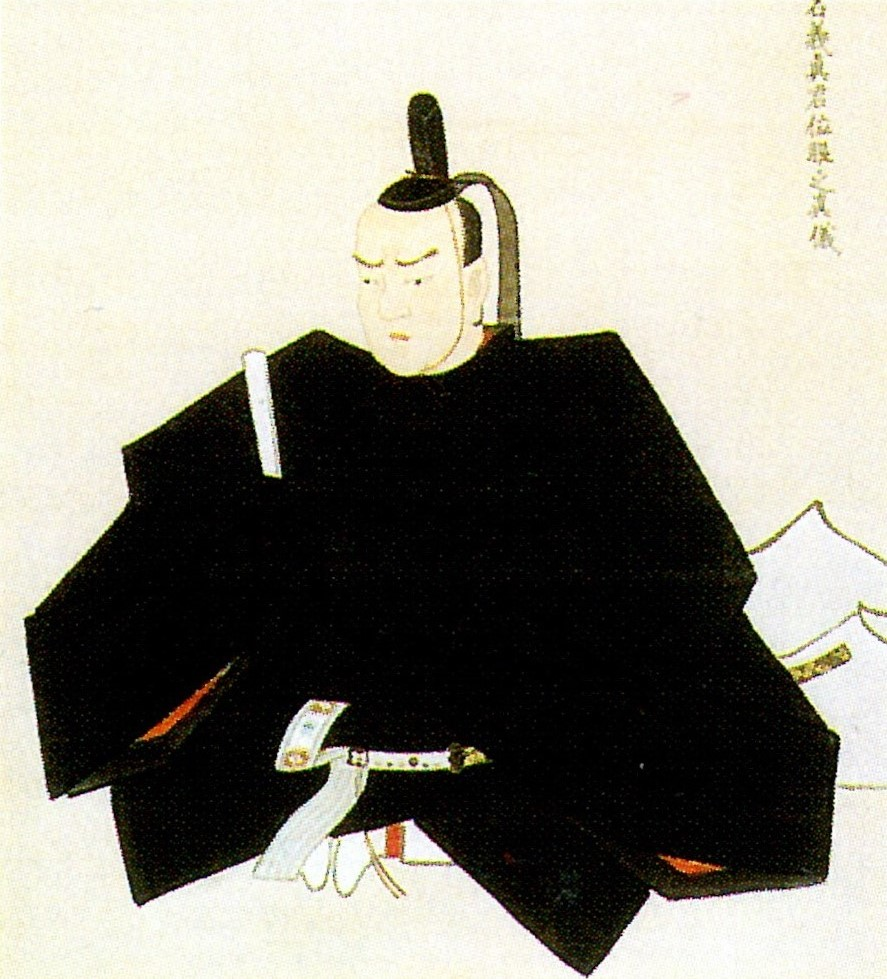
- Satake Yoshimasa, portrait at Tentoku-ji, Akita

6th Daimyō of Kubota Domain
- In office 1749–1753
- Monarch: Shōgun: Tokugawa Ieshige
- Preceded by: Satake Yoshizumi
- Succeeded by: Satake Yoshimasa

Personal details
- Born: September 7, 1728
- Died: September 17, 1753 (aged 25) Kubota Castle, Akita, Japan
- Spouse(s): Gōhime, daughter of Maeda Yoshinori of Kaga Domain
- Parent: Satake Yoshikata (father)

Satake Yoshimasa (佐竹義真; September 7, 1728 – September 17, 1753) was the 6th daimyō of Kubota Domain in Dewa Province, Japan (modern-day Akita Prefecture), and then 24th hereditary chieftain of the Satake clan. His courtesy title was Sahyōe-no-kami and Jijū and his Court rank was Junior Fourth Rank, Lower Grade.

== Biography ==
Satake Yoshimasa was the eldest son of Satake Yoshikata of Kubota-Shinden Domain and was adopted as heir to Satake Yoshizumi in 1742. He was received in formal audience by Shōgun Tokugawa Yoshimune in 1744, and became daimyō of Kubota in 1749. In 1751, he married Gōhime (1737–1762), the daughter of Maeda Yoshinori of Kaga Domain and he made his first visit to his domain the same year. Kubota Domain was rent by peasant uprisings and by plots among his retainers caused by the years of mismanagement of the domain by his predecessor. Yoshimasa died at Kubota Castle in 1753 after complaining of sudden stomach pains and growing numbness in his limbs. During the Edo period it was widely suspected that he had been poisoned. As he had no children, the domain passed to Satake Yoshiharu, the eldest son of Satake Yoshimichi of Iwasaki Domain.

== See also ==
- Satake clan
