= Satake Yoshitaka (1609–1672) =

Japanese daimyō (1609–1672)

- 佐竹義隆
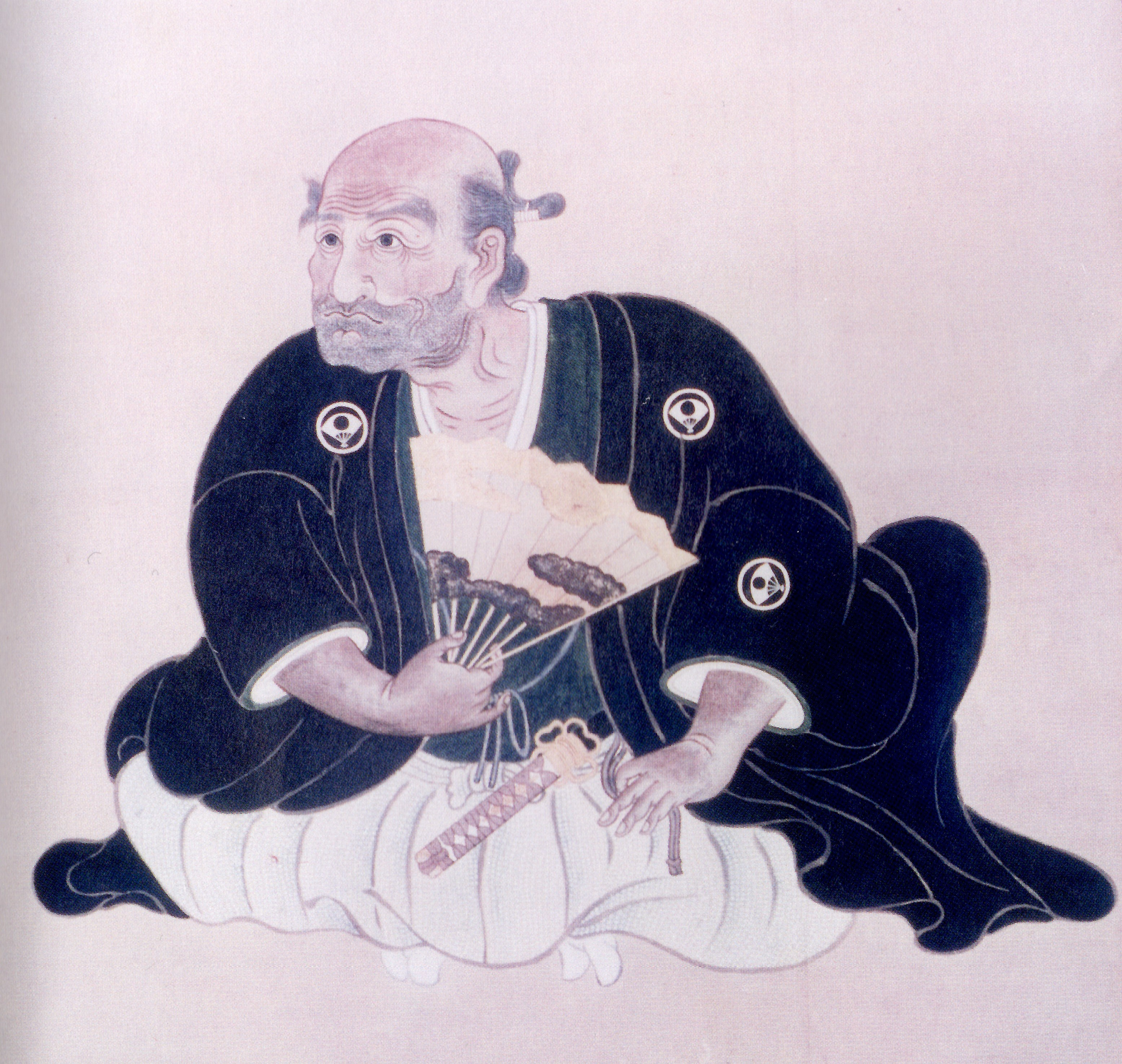
- Satake Yoshitaka, portrait at Tentoku-ji, Akita

2nd Daimyō of Kubota Domain
- In office 1633–1671
- Monarchs: Shōgun: Tokugawa Iemitsu; Tokugawa Ietsuna
- Preceded by: Satake Yoshinobu
- Succeeded by: Satake Yoshizumi

1st Daimyō of Kameda Domain
- In office 1623–1626
- Preceded by: none -
- Succeeded by: Iwaki Nobutaka

1st Daimyō of Shinano-Nakamura Domain
- In office 1620–1623
- Preceded by: Iwaki Sadataka
- Succeeded by: -none-

Personal details
- Born: February 18, 1609
- Died: January 4, 1672 (aged 62) Kubota Domain, Japan
- Spouse(s): Kōshō-in, daughter of Satake Yoshiaki
- Parent: Iwaki Sadataka (father)

Satake Yoshitaka (佐竹義隆; February 18, 1609 – January 4, 1672) was a daimyō in early Edo period Japan under the Tokugawa shogunate and the 20th head of the Satake clan and 2nd of Kubota Domain in Dewa Province. His courtesy title was Sakonoeshōshō and Jijū and his Court rank was Junior Fourth Rank, Lower Grade.

== Biography ==
Yoshitaka was born in 1609 as the eldest son of Iwaki Sadataka, the 3rd son of Satake Yoshishige. His mother was the daughter of Sōma Yoshitane.

On the death of his father in 1620, he became daimyō of Shinano-Nakamura Domain (10,000 koku), taking the name of Iwaki Yoshitaka. This was a small domain in what is now Nagano Prefecture, awarded to the once illustrious Iwaki clan after the Battle of Osaka. In 1622, his kokudaka were increased by 10,000 koku in Yuri District, Dewa Province, and in November 1623, he moved his seat from Shinano-Nakamura to that location, where he built a jin'ya. This was the beginning of Kameda Domain which would last to the Meiji restoration. Yoshitaka was awarded lower 5th court rank and the courtesy title of Shuri-Daiyu in December 1624.

Yoshitaka was adopted as heir by his uncle, Satake Yoshinobu of Kubota Domain in April 1626, following the disinheritance of Yoshinobu’s son Satake Yoshinao for incompetence, and was given the name Satake Yoshitaka. He turned Kameda Domain over to his younger brother. On April 27, 1626, he was presented in formal audience to Tokugawa Hidetada and Tokugawa Iemitsu, and was awarded lower 4th court rank and the courtesy title of Jijū (侍従). Yoshitaka was awarded an estate of 50,000 koku in November 1630 by his adoptive father, who exhibited no signs of intending to retire or relax his control over Kubota Domain. However, on Yoshinobu’s death on February 26, 1633, Yoshitaka finally succeeded to the leadership of the clan. He was permitted to formally enter the domain for the first time on May 8, 1633. On December 28, 1666, his court title was promoted to “General of the Left Imperial Guard” (左近衛少将). He died at Kubota Castle on December 5, 1671.

His official wife was the daughter of Satake Yoshiaki, and he is known to have had at least two concubines. His eldest son, Yoshioki predeceased him at the age of 22, and Yoshioki’s son became daimyō of Kubota-Shinden Domain. Yoshitaka’s second son, Satake Yoshizumi inherited Kubota Domain.
