= Satake Yoshitaka =

Japanese daimyō (1825–1884)

Marquess Satake Yoshitaka
- 佐竹義堯
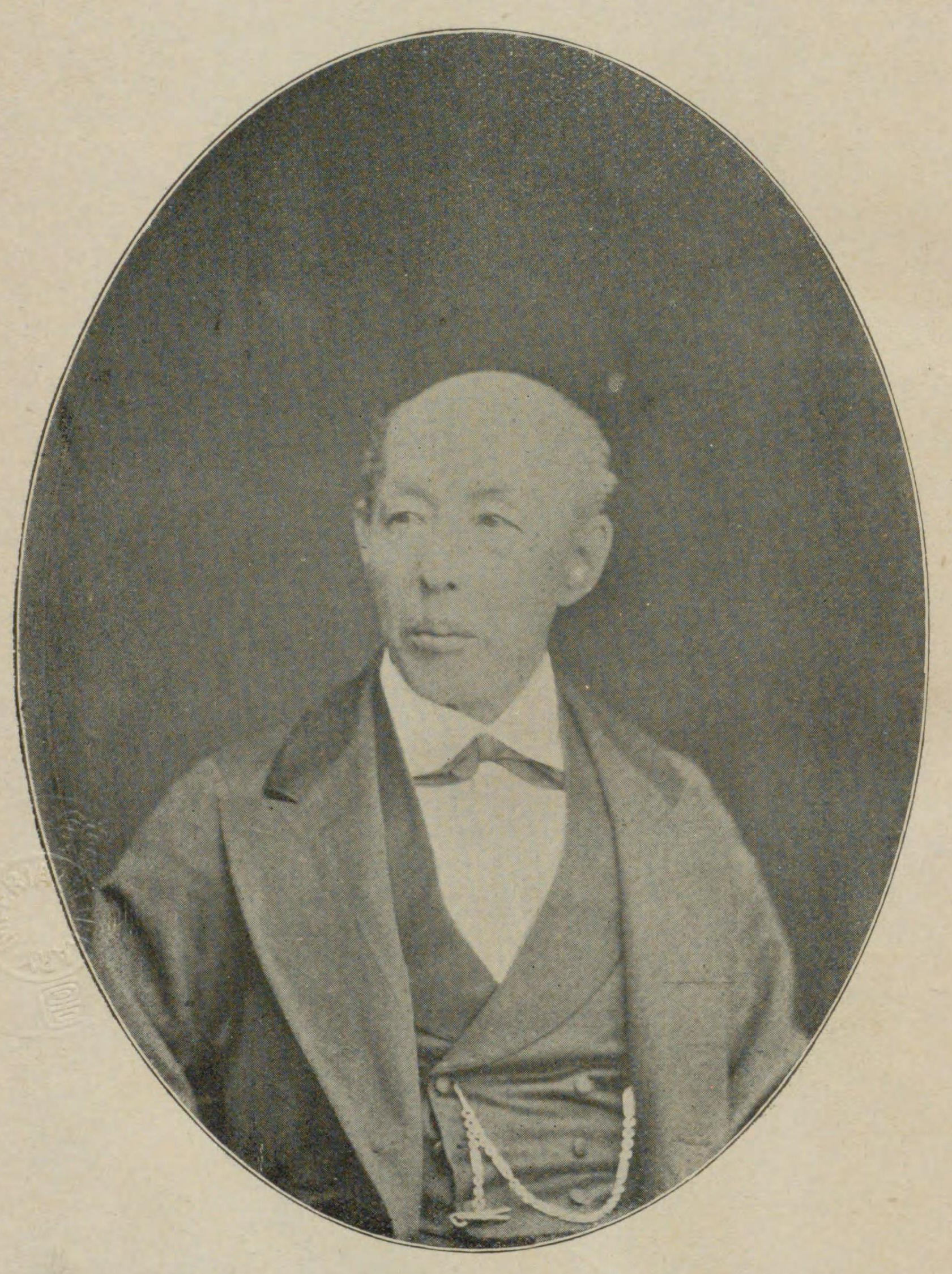
- Satake Yoshitaka
- Monarchs: Kōmei; Meiji; Shōgun: Tokugawa Ieyoshi; Tokugawa Iesada; Tokugawa Ieshige; Tokugawa Yoshinobu

7th Daimyō of Iwasaki Domain
- In office 1849–1857
- Preceded by: Satake Yoshizumi
- Succeeded by: Satake Yoshitsuma

12th Daimyō of Kubota Domain
- In office 1857–1869
- Preceded by: Satake Yoshichika
- Succeeded by: Office abolished

Imperial Governor of Kubota
- In office 1869–1871
- Monarch: Emperor Meiji

Personal details
- Born: September 9, 1825
- Died: August 23, 1884 (aged 58) Tokyo, Japan
- Spouses: Taki; Some; Daughter of Aoyama Tadanaga
- Parent: Sōma Masatane (father)

Marquess Satake Yoshitaka (佐竹義堯; September 9, 1825 – August 23, 1884) was the 12th (and final) daimyō of Kubota Domain in Dewa Province, Japan (modern-day Akita Prefecture), and is ranked as the 30th and 32nd hereditary chieftain of the Satake clan.

== Biography ==
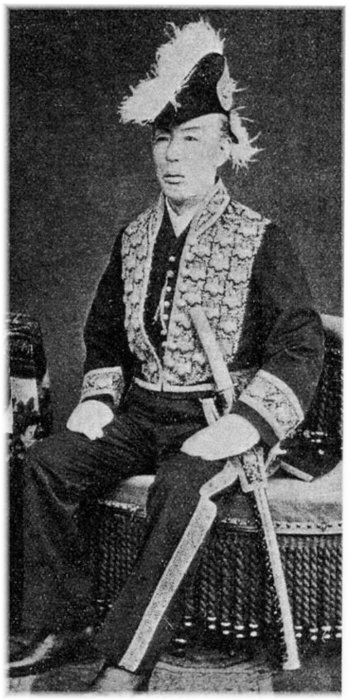
Satake Yoshitaka in Western dress

Satake Yoshitaka was the third son of Sōma Masatane of Sōma Nakamura Domain and received the name of Sōma Munetake (相馬宗胤) upon his genpuku (coming of age ceremony) in 1839. As the Sōma clan and Satake clan often adopted each other's sons as heirs, he was adopted by Satake Yoshizumi as heir to Iwasaki Domain in 1849 and changed his name to Satake Yoshizane (佐竹義核). He married Yoshizumi's daughter, and was received in formal audience by Shōgun Tokugawa Ieyoshi the same year. He became daimyō on his adopted father's retirement later the same year.

Following the death of Satake Yoshichika in 1857 without male heir, he was posthumously adopted as Yoshichika's son and became daimyō of Kubota Domain, changing his name at that time to Satake Yoshitaka (佐竹義就). He received the courtesy title of Ukyō-no-daifu and Jijū and Court rank of Junior Fourth Rank, Lower Grade. In 1862, he changed the kanji of his name to "佐竹義堯".

He visited his domains for the first time in 1859. That year, a Russian steamer was sighted near Oga Peninsula causing panic among the citizens of Akita. Although Sonnō jōi sentiment was rampant across Japan, including Akita, he allowed a landing party from the steamer to land on the coast and to collect firewood. He continued policies of fiscal retrenchment and development of new industries to raise revenues to pay for the ever increasing expenses for military assistance demanded by the shogunate. In 1862 he returned to Edo and was assigned to the retinue of Shōgun Tokugawa Ieshige on his procession to Kyoto. He was received by Emperor Komei and returned to Akita via Edo the following year. Later that year, he was ordered by the Shōgun to come to Edo, but feigning illness, sent a delegation of senior retainers instead. At the end of the year, he received a second summons to provide troops for the defense of Edo. In 1864, he was ordered to send troops for the protection of Kyoto, but instead sent 20,000 ryō in newly-printed paper currency and 35,000 koku of rice. Despite failing to send any troops, the shogunate rewarded him with a promotion in courtesy title to Sakonoeshōshō and a raise in court rank to Junior Fourth Rank, Upper Grade. In 1865, the shogunate again demanded that he send military forces to Kyoto, and he refused again, citing illness. The shogunate agreed to postpone the demand until the following year. In 1866, he once again feigned illness, but his time advanced as far as Edo, where he secluded himself at his Edo residence. In 1867, the shogunate attempted to entice him with a raise in courtesy title to Sakonoechūshō; however, Yoshitaka cited a crop failure in Akita and a pandemic, and asked for leave to return to his domains to manage the situation. This was refused, so he sent senior retainers to Kyoto to make contact with the pro-imperial forces, and returned to his domain without permission from the Shōgun.

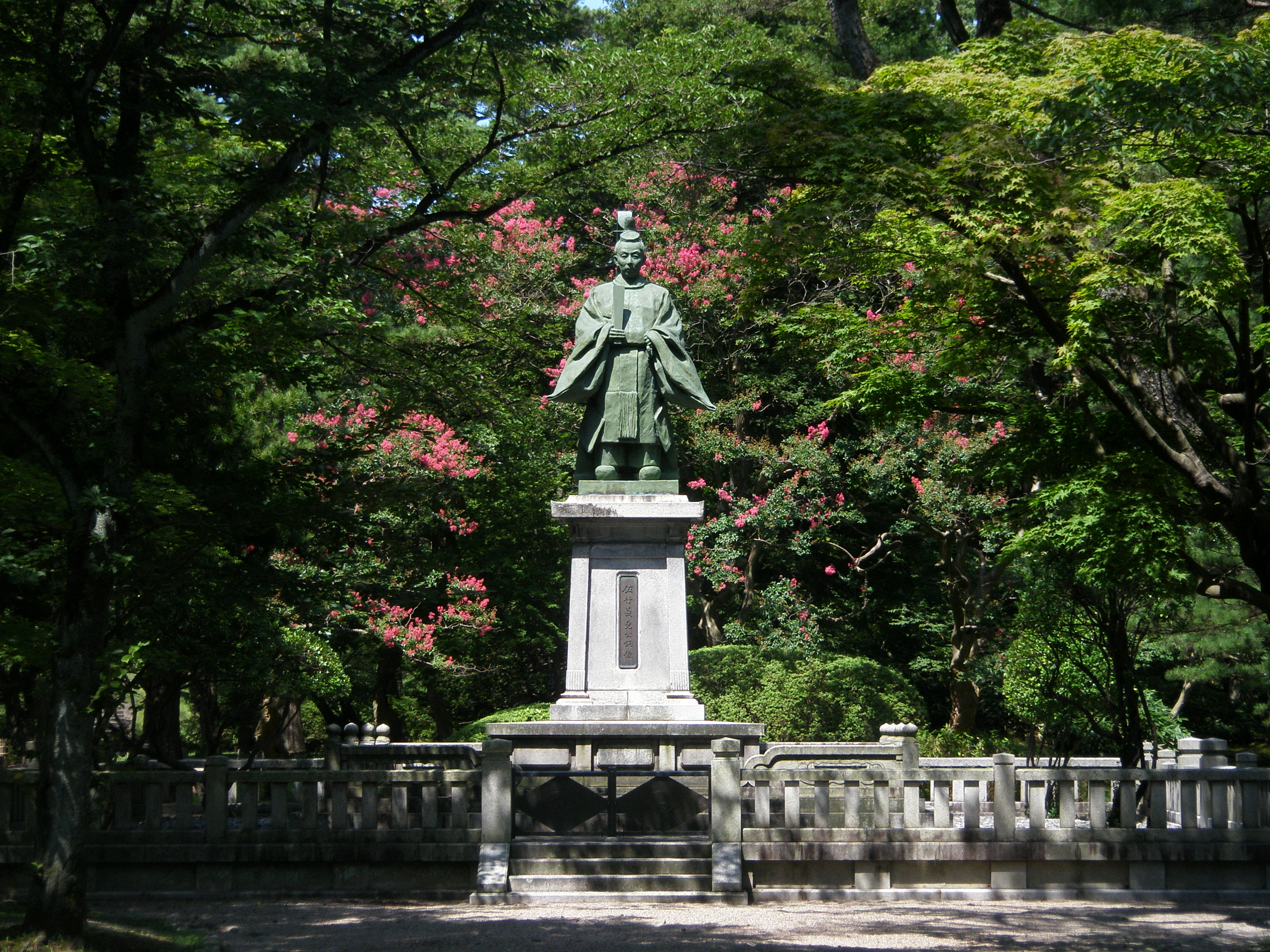
Statue of Satake Yoshitaka in Senshū Park, Akita

During the Boshin War of 1868–69, Kubota Domain was a signatory to the pact that formed the Ōuetsu Reppan Dōmei, the alliance of northern domains led by the Sendai Domain. The Satake clan's delegation at Shiroishi, the alliance's headquarters, was led by the clan elder (karō) Tomura Yoshiari. However, the Satake had political difficulties with the alliance, which culminated in the murder, in Akita, of a delegation from Sendai on August 21, 1868, and the display of the messengers' gibbeted heads at Kubota Castle. The delegation, led by Shimo Matazaemon, was dispatched to request Kubota Domain to hand over Kujō Michitaka and other officials of an imperial delegation that had been originally sent to the region to gather support for the imperial cause. The Satake then backed out of the alliance and supported the imperial army; eleven days later, on September 1, 1868 the Tsugaru clan of the neighboring Hirosaki Domain followed suit. In response, the pro-alliance domains of Morioka and Ichinoseki Domains sent troops to attack Kubota. Kubota forces were hard-pressed to defend their territory, with the result that the alliance troops had made serious advances by the time the war ended in northern Honshū. In early 1869, Satake Yoshitaka formally gave up the domain's registers to the imperial government, and was made imperial governor of Akita (han chiji). In mid-1869, the imperial government rewarded Kubota by raising its kokudaka by 20,000 koku.

Satake Yoshitaka relocated to Tokyo in 1871 after the abolition of the han system and subsequently received the kazoku peerage title of koshaku (Marquess).

== Family ==
- Father: Sōma Masatane
- First wife: Taki (daughter of Satake Yoshizumi)
- Second wife: Some (daughter of Todo Takayori of Hisai Domain)
- Third wife: daughter of Aoyama Tadanaga of Sasayama Domain

== See also ==
- Satake clan
