= Satake Yoshitada =

Japanese daimyō (1695–1715)

- 佐竹義格
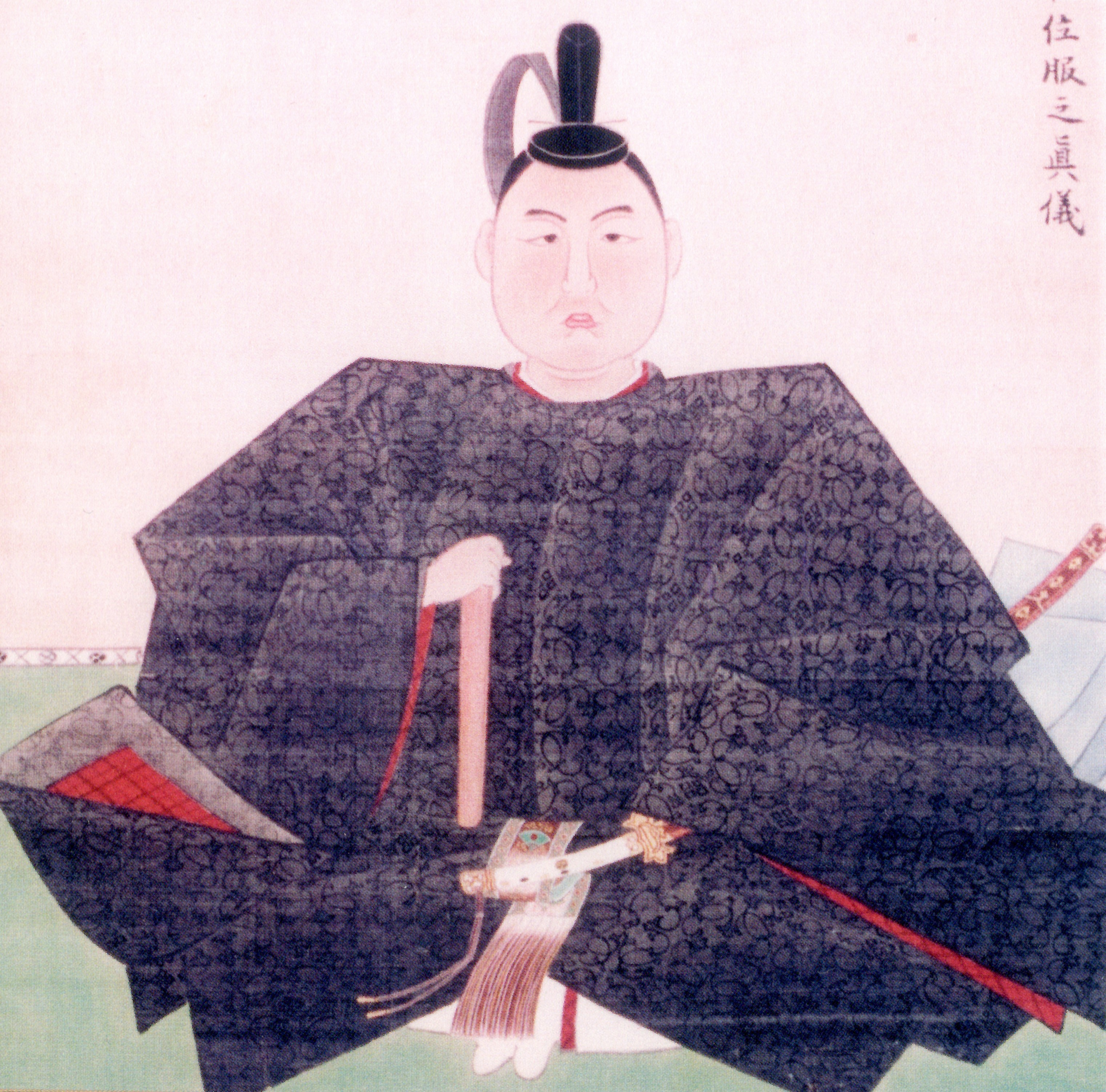
- Satake Yoshitada, portrait at Tentoku-ji, Akita

4th Daimyō of Kubota Domain
- In office 1703–1715
- Monarchs: Shōgun: Tokugawa Tsunayoshi; Tokugawa Ienobu; Tokugawa Ietsugu
- Preceded by: Satake Yoshizumi
- Succeeded by: Satake Yoshimine

Personal details
- Born: January 25, 1695
- Died: August 17, 1715 (aged 20) Kubota Castle, Dewa Province
- Spouse: -none-
- Parent: Satake Yoshizumi (father)

Satake Yoshitada (佐竹義格; January 25, 1695 – August 17, 1715) was the 4th daimyō of Kubota Domain in Dewa Province, Japan (modern-day Akita Prefecture), and then 22nd hereditary chieftain of the Satake clan. His courtesy title was Daizen-no-taifu and Jijū and his Court rank was Junior Fourth Rank, Lower Grade.

== Biography ==
Satake Yoshitada was the third son of Satake Yoshizumi and was born to one of his concubines. As his eldest brother had died in childhood and his next eldest brother had been adopted by the Sōma clan and was now Sōma Nobutane, daimyō of Sōma Domain, he was named heir in 1700. In 1703, he was presented in formal audience to Shōgun Tokugawa Tsunayoshi and became daimyō on the death of his father four months later. During his tenure, he ordered the planting of trees to help increase the domain's revenues, and implemented measures for fiscal reform and for the relied of the poor. In 1711, he visited his domain for the first time. However, he died in 1715 at Kubota Castle before these efforts began to bear fruit, and the attempts at reform largely ended with his death.

Yoshitada was engaged to a daughter of Asano Tsunanaga of Hiroshima Domain, but died before the marriage could take place, and thus had no official wife. He did have a son by a concubine who died in infancy. Kubota Domain was inherited by Satake Yoshimine, the second son of Satake Yoshinaga of Iwasaki Domain and grandson of Satake Yoshizumi.

== See also ==
- Satake clan
