= Satake Yoshichika =

- 佐竹義睦
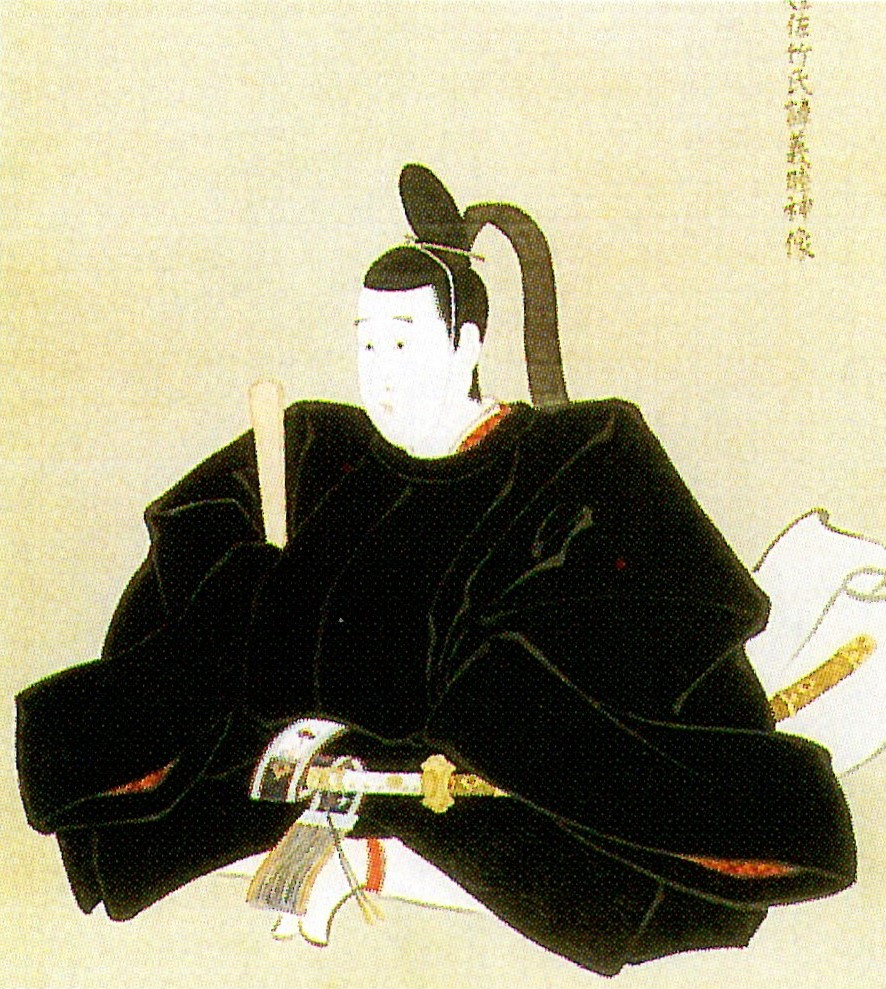
- Satake Yoshichika, portrait at Tentoku-ji, Akita

11th Daimyō of Kubota Domain
- In office 1846–1857
- Monarchs: Shōgun: Tokugawa Ieyoshi; Tokugawa Iesada
- Preceded by: Satake Yoshihiro
- Succeeded by: Satake Yoshitaka

Personal details
- Born: July 2, 1839
- Died: August 20, 1857 (aged 18) Kubota Castle, Akita, Japan
- Spouse(s): Setsuko, daughter of Yamauchi Toyosuke of Tosa Domain
- Parent: Satake Yoshihiro (father)

Satake Yoshichika (佐竹義睦; July 2, 1839 – August 20, 1857) was the 11th daimyō of Kubota Domain in Dewa Province, Japan (modern-day Akita Prefecture), and the 29th hereditary chieftain of the Satake clan. His courtesy titles were Ukyō-no-daifu and Jijū and his Court rank was Junior Fourth Rank, Lower Grade.

== Biography ==
Satake Yoshichika was the second son of Satake Yoshihiro and became daimyō on his father's death in 1846. He was received in formal audience by Shōgun Tokugawa Iesada in 1854 and his position was confirmed. He visited his domains for the first time in 1855. During his minority the domain was run by a council of clan elders, who continued policies of fiscal retrenchment and development of new industries to raise revenues to pay for the ever increasing expenses for military assistance demanded by the shōgunate. In 1857 he wed Setsuko, the daughter of Yamauchi Toyosuke of Tosa Domain and visited Kubota for the second time. That same year, the Eastern branch of the Satake clan attempted a coup against his rule. Although the coup failed, Yoshichika fell ill and died two months later at Kubota Castle. As he had only one daughter, the domain was posthumously inherited by Satake Yoshitaka of the Iwasaki Domain.

== See also ==
- Satake clan
