= Kubota Domain =

Historical state

Akita Domain (1871) 秋田藩 Kubota Domain (1602–1871) 久保田藩
- Domain of Japan
- 1602–1871
- Flag
- Capital: Kubota Castle
- Area
  - Coordinates: 39°43′24.53″N 140°7′23.67″E
  - Type: Daimyō
- Historical era: Edo period
  - Established: 1602
  - Disestablished: 1871
Preceded by	Succeeded by
Dewa Province	Akita Prefecture
- Today part of: Akita Prefecture

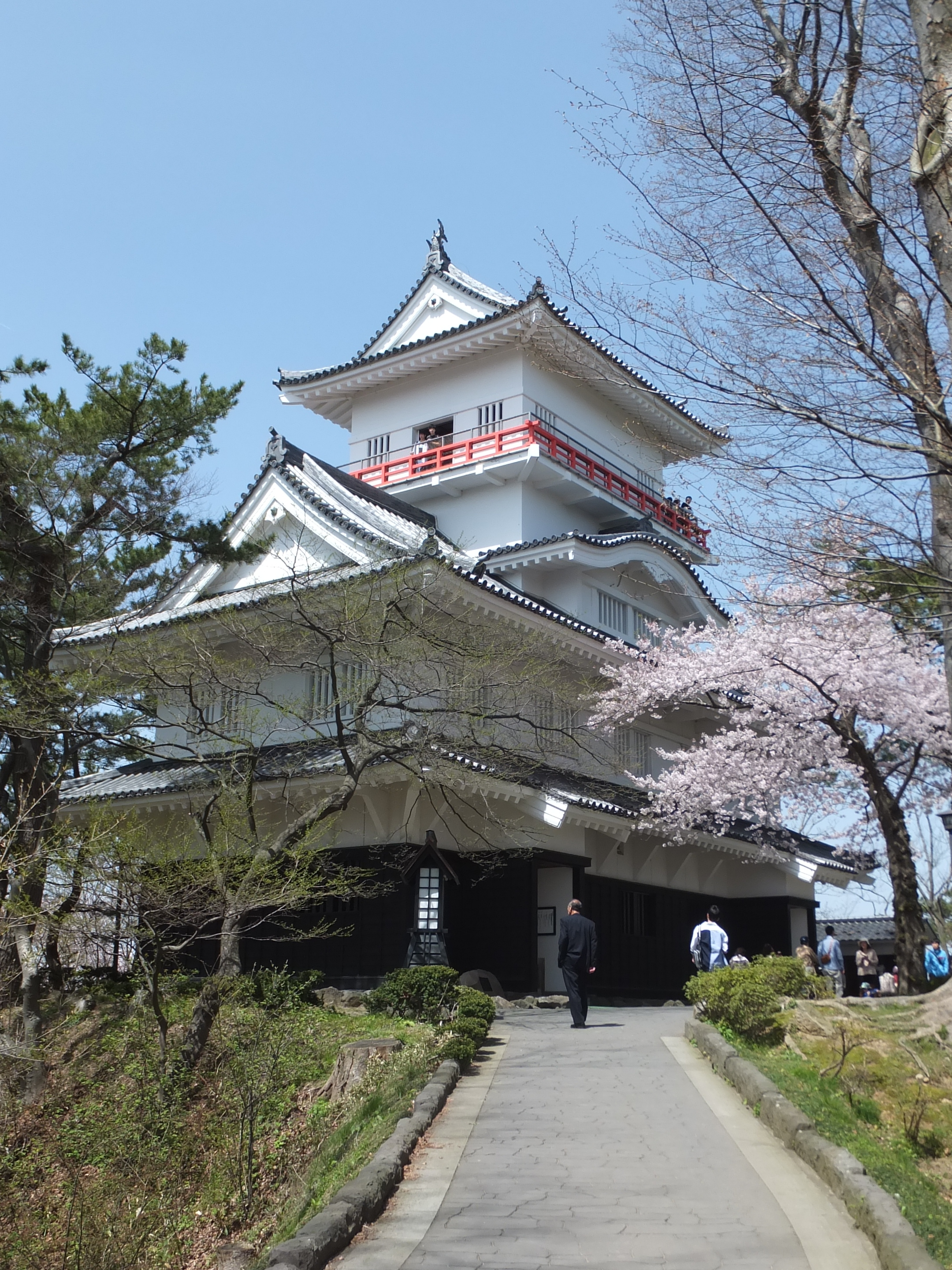
Kubota Castle, the seat of the Kubota Domain (Akita Domain)

Kubota Domain (久保田藩, Kubota han) was a feudal domain in Edo period Japan, located in Dewa Province (modern-day Akita Prefecture), Japan. It was centered on Kubota Castle in what is now the city of Akita and was thus also known as the Akita Domain (秋田藩, Akita han). It was governed for the whole of its history by the Satake clan. During its rule over Kubota, the Satake clan was ranked as a Province-holding daimyō (国持ち大名, kunimochi daimyō) family, and as such, had the privilege of shogunal audiences in the Great Hall (Ohiroma) of Edo Castle.

In the Boshin War of 1868–69, the domain joined the Ōuetsu Reppan Dōmei, the alliance of northern domains supporting the Tokugawa shogunate, but then later defected to the imperial side. As with all other domains, it was disbanded in 1871.

== History ==
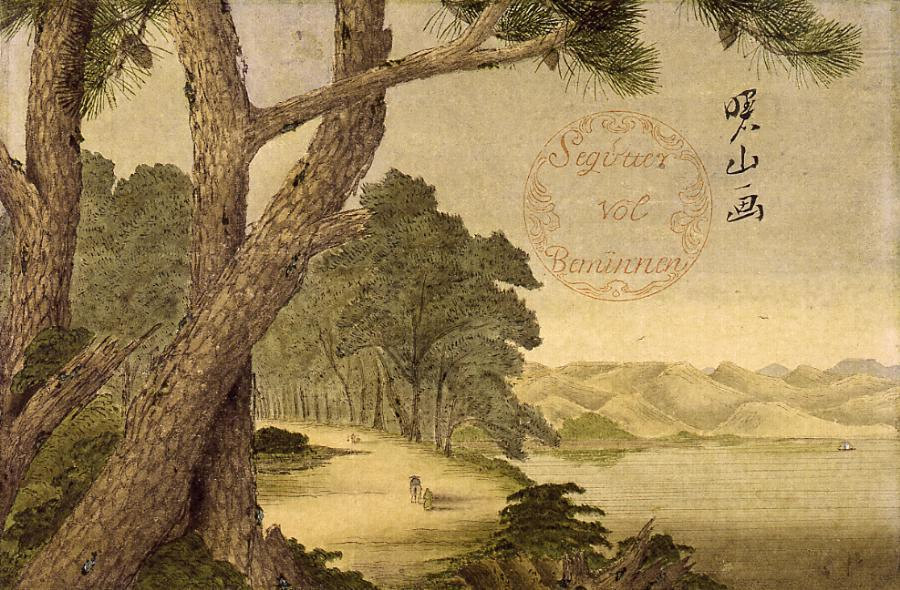
Painting by Satake Yoshiatsu (Satake Shozan), 8th generation lord of Kubota

The Satake clan was a powerful samurai clan, who ruled Hitachi Province from the late Heian period through the end of the Sengoku period. In 1600, the Satake sided with the pro-Toyotomi cause at the Battle of Sekigahara. After the defeat of the pro-Toyotomi forces by Tokugawa Ieyasu and the establishment of the Tokugawa shogunate, the Satake clan was punished by a severe reduction in its kokudaka. and by being ordered to relocate from their ancestral territories in Hitachi Province to a much smaller fief in inhospitable northern Japan. As a result of this drop in income (to 205,000 koku, or less than half of their previous kokudaka of around 540,000 koku), the Satake had to lay off many retainers, and institute a general stipend reduction for those it kept.

The domain also struggled through agricultural crises, which resulted in several peasant uprisings throughout the course of its history. It was also beset by an internal O-Ie Sōdō conflict, the Satake disturbance (佐竹騒動, Satake-sōdō), which was brought on by financial issues.

The domain had a population of 56,813 people per the 1730 census. It maintained its primary residence (kamiyashiki) in Edo at Uchi-Kanda Asahi-cho until a fire in 1682, after which the residence was moved to Shichigen-cho in Shitaya. The domain’s secondary residence (shimoyashiki) was in Fukagawa (later moved to Sakumachō), and its tertiary residences (nakayashiki) in Torigoe, Honjo and Nippori.

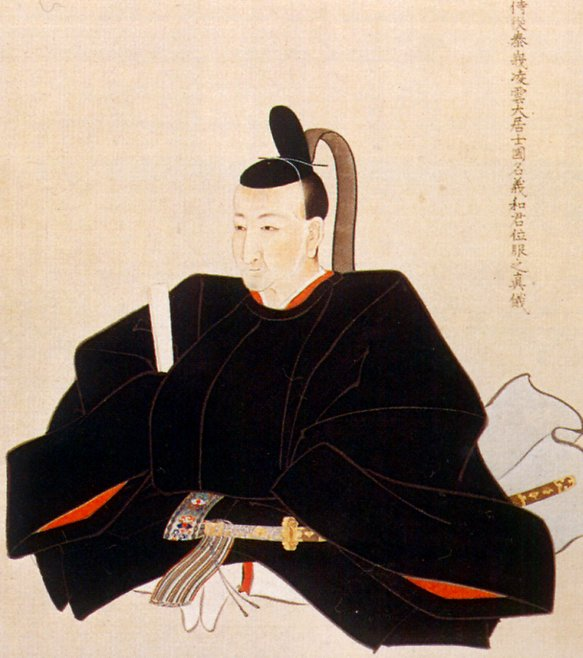
Satake Yoshimasa, 9th generation lord of Kubota

Satake Yoshiatsu (better known by his nom-de-plume "Satake Shozan"), the 8th generation lord of Kubota, was an accomplished artist. Yoshiatsu painted a number of paintings in the Dutch style, and also produced three treatises on European painting techniques, including the depiction of perspective. He was also a student of Dutch studies (rangaku) scholar Hiraga Gennai, who he had invited up to Akita to advise him on management of the domain's copper mines. It was during Yoshiatsu's lifetime that the Akita school (秋田派, Akita-ha) of art was born and briefly flourished.

Kubota Domain was uncommon in that it contained more than one castle, and was an exception to the Tokugawa shogunate's "one castle per domain" rule. The main castle was Kubota Castle, but there were also castles at Yokote and Ōdate, and five fortified estates elsewhere in the domain: Kakunodate, Yuzawa, Hiyama, Jūniso, and In'nai. Each of these was given to a senior retainer who ran it as his own small castle town. The senior retainers had personal retainers who resided in these castle towns.

Kubota Domain had two sub-domains: Iwasaki (20,000 koku) and the short-lived Kubota-shinden (10,000 koku).

Two of the clan elder (karō) families serving the Kubota domain were branches of the Satake family. One was the North Satake (Satake-hokke) family, stipended at 10,000 koku; the other the West Satake (Satake-nishi ke) family, stipended at 7200 koku. The North Satake family had its landholdings around Kakunodate, one of the fortified estates mentioned above; the West Satake resided in and had their landholdings around Ōdate. Yokote Castle was in the care of another hereditary karō family, the Tomura. Norihisa Satake, the current mayor of the city of Akita, is a descendant of the North Satake.

During the Boshin War of 1868–69, the Satake clan was a signatory to the pact that formed the Ōuetsu Reppan Dōmei, the alliance of northern domains led by the Sendai Domain. The Satake clan's delegation at Shiroishi, the alliance's headquarters, was led by the clan elder (karō) Tomura Yoshiari. However, the Satake had political difficulties with the alliance, which culminated in the murder, in Akita, of a delegation from Sendai on August 21, 1868, and the display of the messengers' gibbeted heads in the Akita castle town. The delegation, led by Shimo Matazaemon, was dispatched to request the Akita domain to hand over Kujō Michitaka and other officials of an imperial delegation that had been originally sent to the region to gather support for the imperial cause. The Satake then backed out of the alliance and supported the imperial army; eleven days later, on September 1, 1868 the Tsugaru clan of the neighboring Hirosaki Domain followed suit. In response, the pro-alliance domains of Morioka and Ichinoseki Domains sent troops to attack Kubota. Kubota forces were hard-pressed to defend their territory, with the result that the alliance troops had made serious advances by the time the war ended in northern Honshū. In early 1869, Satake Yoshitaka formally gave up the domain's registers to the imperial government, and was made imperial governor of Kubota (han chiji). In mid-1869, the imperial government rewarded its service in the Boshin War with an increase in kokudaka of 20,000 koku. However, with the abolition of the han system in 1871, the former domain was absorbed into the new Akita Prefecture and Satake Yoshitaka was ordered to relocate to Tokyo. He subsequently received the kazoku peerage title of koshaku (marquis).

== Holdings at the end of the Edo period ==
As with most domains in the han system, Kubota Domain consisted of several discontinuous territories calculated to provide the assigned kokudaka, based on periodic cadastral surveys and projected agricultural yields.

- Dewa Province
  - 286 villages in Akita District
  - 59 villages in Kawabe District
  - 181 villages in Senboku District
  - 115 villages in Hiraka District
  - 59 villages in Yamamoto District
  - 55 villages in Ogachi District
- Shimotsuke Province
  - 3 villages in Tsuga District
  - 8 villages in Kawachi District
- Teshio Province, Ezo
  - 1 trading post in Mashike District
- Kitami Province, Ezo
  - 1 trading post in Rishiri District
  - 1 trading post in Rebun District
  - most of Soya District

== List of Daimyō ==
#	Name	Tenure	Courtesy title	Court Rank	kokudaka
* Satake clan (tozama) 1602-1871
1	Satake Yoshinobu (佐竹義宣)	1602-1609	Ukyō-no-daifū (右京大夫); Sakon'e-chūjō (中将)	Junior 4th Rank, Upper Grade (従四位上))	205,000 koku
2	Satake Yoshitaka (佐竹義隆)	1609-1672	Shuri-daifū (修理大夫); Sakon'e-shōshō (少将)	Junior 4th Rank, Lower Grade (従四位下)	205,000 koku
3	Satake Yoshizumi (佐竹義処)	1637-1703	Ukyō-no-daifū (右京大夫); Sakon'e-shōshō (少将)	Junior 4th Rank, Lower Grade (従四位下)	205,000 koku
4	Satake Yoshitada (佐竹義格)	1695-1715	Daizen-no-kami (大膳大夫); Jijū (侍従)	Junior 4th Rank, Lower Grade (従四位下)	205,000 koku
5	Satake Yoshimine (佐竹義峯)	1690-1745	Ukyō-no-daibū (右京大夫); Sakon'e-shōshō (少将)	Junior 4th Rank, Lower Grade (従四位下)	205,000 koku
6	Satake Yoshimasa (佐竹義真)	1728-1753	Sahyoē-no-kami (左兵衛督)	Junior 4th Rank, Lower Grade (従四位下)	205,000 koku
7	Satake Yoshiharu (佐竹義明)	1723-1758	Ukyō-no-daifū (右京大夫); Jiju (侍従)	Junior 4th Rank, Lower Grade (従四位下)	205,000 koku
8	Satake Yoshiatsu (佐竹義敦)	1748-1785	Ukyō-no-daifū (右京大夫); Jijū (侍従)	Junior 4th Rank, Lower Grade (従四位下)	205,000 koku
9	Satake Yoshimasa (佐竹義和)	1775-1815	Ukyō-no-daifū (右京大夫); Jijū (侍従)	Junior 4th Rank, Lower Grade (従四位下)	205,000 koku
10	Satake Yoshihiro (佐竹義厚)	1812-1846	Ukyō-no-daifū (右京大夫); Sakon'e-shōshō (少将)	Junior 4th Rank, Lower Grade (従四位下)	205,000 koku
11	Satake Yoshichika (佐竹義睦)	1839-1857	Ukyō-no-daifū (右京大夫); Jijū (侍従)	Junior 4th Rank, Lower Grade (従四位下)	205,000 koku
12	Satake Yoshitaka (佐竹義堯)	1825-1884	Ukyō-no-daifū(右京大夫); Sakon'e-chūjō (中将)	Junior 4th Rank, Upper Grade (従四位上)	205,000->225,000 koku

=== Genealogy (simplified) ===
- Satake Yoshishige, 18th head of the Satake clan (1547-1612)
  - I. Yoshinobu, 1st daimyō of Kubota (cr. 1602) (1570-1633; r. 1602-1633)
  - Iwaki Sadataka, Lord of Shinano-Nakamura (1583-1620)
    - II. Satake Yoshitaka, 2nd daimyō of Kubota (1609-1672; r. 1633-1672)
      - Yoshioki (1633-1665)
        - Yoshikuni, 1st daimyō of Kubota-Shinden (1665-1725)
          - Yoshikata, 2nd daimyō of Kubota-Shinden (1692-1742)
            - VI. Yoshimasa, 6th daimyō of Kubota (1728-1753; r. 1749-1753)
      - III. Yoshizumi, 3rd daimyō of Kubota (1637-1703; r. 1672-1703)
        - IV. Yoshitada, 4th daimyō of Kubota (1695-1715; r. 1703-1715)
        - Sōma Nobutane, 6th daimyō of Sōma-Nakamura (1677-1711)
          - Sōma Noritane (1702-1752)
            - Sōma Morotane, 8th daimyō of Sōma-Nakamura (1734-1791)
              - Sōma Yoshitane, 9th daimyō of Sōma-Nakamura (1765-1813)
                - Sōma Masutane, 11th daimyō of Sōma-Nakamura (1796-1845)
                  - Sōma Mitsutane, 12th daimyō of Sōma-Nakamura (1819-1887)
                    - Satake Yoshisato, 9th daimyō of Iwasaki, 1st Viscount (1858-1914)
                      - Yoshitatsu, 2nd Baron, head of the Iwasaki branch (1885-1935; Baron: 1893-1929)
                        - Yoshiaki, head of the Iwasaki branch (1919-1976)
                          - Yoshitomo, head of the Iwasaki branch (b. 1951)
                            - Asanashi (b. 1986)
                  - XII. Satake Yoshitaka II, 12th daimyō of Kubota, 1st Marquess (1825-1884; Lord: 1857-1868; Governor: 1869-1871; 30th family head: 1857-1872; 32nd family head: 1881-1884; Marquess: cr. 1884)
                    - Yoshinari, 33rd family head, 2nd Marquess (1867-1915; 33rd family head and 2nd Marquess: 1884-1915)
                      - Yoshiharu, 34th family head, 3rd Marquess (1890-1944; 34th family head and 3rd Marquess: 1915-1944)
                        - Yoshihide, 35th family head, 4th Marquess (1914-1983; 35th family head: 1944-1983; 4th Marquess: 1944-1947), m. Tokugawa Yuriko (b. 1917), dau. of Tokugawa Yoshichika, 1st Marquess (1886-1976), and brother of Ogiu (Matsudaira) Yoshitatsu, 3rd Count (b. 1916). He adopted his nephew, the son of Ogiu Yoshitatsu:
                          - Satake (Ogiu) Takashi, 36th family head (b. 1947; 36th family head: 1983-present)
                            - Motohiro (b. 1981)
                            - Akihiro (b. 1982)
                  - Satake Yoshimatsu, 8th daimyō of Iwasaki (1837-1870)
                    - Yoshinao, 31st family head, 1st Baron (1854-1893; 31st family head: 1872-1881; Baron: 1889)
      - Yoshinaga, 1st daimyō of Iwasaki (1655-1741)
        - V. Yoshimine, 5th daimyō of Kubota (1690-1749; r. 1715-1749)
  - A daughter, m. Takakura Nagayoshi (1592-1664)
    - Satake Yoshichika (1619-1702)
      - Yoshihide (1645-1721)
        - Yoshimoto (1675-1752)
          - Yoshimichi, 2nd daimyō of Iwasaki (1701-1765)
            - VII. Yoshiharu, 7th daimyō of Kubota (1723-1758; r. 1753-1758)
              - VIII. Yoshiatsu, 8th daimyō of Kubota (1748-1785; r. 1758-1785)
                - IX. Yoshimasa, 9th daimyō of Kubota (1775-1815; r. 1785-1815)
                  - X. Yoshihiro, 10th daimyō of Kubota (1812-1846; r. 1815-1846)
                    - XI. Yoshichika, 11th daimyō of Kubota (1839-1857; r. 1846-1857)

== Subsidiary domains ==
=== Iwasaki Domain ===
Iwasaki Domain (岩崎藩, Iwasaki han), also known as Akita Shinden Domain (秋田新田藩, Akita Shinden han) was founded in 1701 for Satake Yoshinaga, the fourth son of Satake Yoshitaka, the 2nd daimyō of Kubota Domain, who assigned him 20,000 koku of rice revenues from newly opened fields. He built a jin'ya in what is now Yuzawa, Akita, where his descendants continued to rule until the Meiji restoration. The domain was unusual in that it did not directly control any territory, but was assigned revenues from the general revenues of the parent domain. The daimyō of Iwasaki Domain participated in the sankin kotai system, and used Kubota Domain’s tertiary residence in Edo, located in Torigoe.

- Satake clan (tozama) 1701-1871

#	Name	Tenure	Courtesy title	Court Rank	kokudaka
1	Satake Yoshinobu (佐竹義宣)	1701-1718	Iki-no-kami (壱岐守); Hyōbu- shōyū (兵部少輔)	Junior 5th Rank, Lower Grade (従五位下)	20,000 koku
2	Satake Yoshimichi (佐竹義道)	1718-1763	Iki-no-kami (壱岐守); Izumi-no-kami (和泉守)	Junior 5th Rank, Lower Grade (従五位下)	20,000 koku
3	Satake Yoshtada (佐竹義忠)	1763-1780	Iki-no-kami (壱岐守); Izumi-no-kami (和泉守)	Junior 5th Rank, Lower Grade (従五位下)	20,000 koku
4	Satake Yoshimoto (佐竹義祇)	1780-1793	Iki-no-kami (壱岐守)	Junior 5th Rank, Lower Grade (従五位下)	20,000 koku
5	Satake Yoshichika (佐竹義知)	1793-1821	Iki-no-kami (壱岐守)	Junior 5th Rank, Lower Grade (従五位下)	20,000 koku
6	Satake Yoshizumi (佐竹義純)	1821-1849	Iki-no-kami (壱岐守)	Junior 5th Rank, Lower Grade (従五位下)	20,000 koku
7	Satake Yoshitaka (佐竹義堯)	1849-1857	Sakon'e-chūjō (中将)	Lower 4th (従四位下) Lower 4th (従四位下)	20,000 koku
8	Satake Yoshimatsu (佐竹義諶)	1857-1869	Iki-no-kami (壱岐守)	Junior 5th Rank, Lower Grade (従五位下)	20,000 koku
9	Satake Yoshisato (佐竹義和)	1869-1871	-none-	-none-	20,000 koku

=== Kubota Shinden Domain ===
Kubota Shinden Domain (久保田新田藩, Kubota Shinden han) was founded in 1701 for Satake Yoshikune, the grandson of Satake Yoshitaka, the 2nd daimyō of Kubota Domain. Satake Yoshizumi, the 3rd daimyō of Kubota domain assigned him 10,000 koku, which he ruled as a subsidiary domain of Kubota Domain until his retirement in 1720. He was succeeded by Satake Yoshikata, who ruled until May 1732. He was adopted by Satake Yoshimine, the 5th daimyo of Kubota Domain to be his heir, and Kubota Shinden Domain was absorbed back into Kubota Domain.

- Satake clan (tozama) 1602-1871

#	Name	Tenure	Courtesy title	Court Rank	Kokudaka
1	Satake Yoshikuni (佐竹義都)	1701-1720	Shikibu-no-shō (式部少輔)	Junior 5th Rank, Lower Grade (従五位下)	10,000 koku
2	Satake Yoshikata (佐竹義堅)	1720-1732	Buzen-no-kami (豊前守)	Junior 5th Rank, Lower Grade (従五位下)	10,000 koku
