= Satake Yoshisato =

Japanese politician

Viscount Satake Yoshisato
- 佐竹 義理
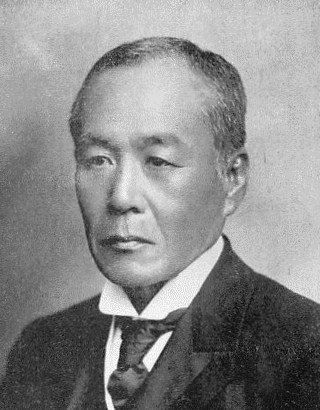

Member of the House of Peers
- In office 10 July 1890 – 9 July 1897 Elected by the Viscounts

Governor of Iwasaki Domain
- In office 1869–1871
- Monarch: Meiji
- Preceded by: Satake Yoshimatsu (as Daimyō of Iwasaki)
- Succeeded by: Position abolished

Personal details
- Born: 10 October 1858
- Died: 26 April 1914 (aged 55)
- Relatives: Satake family

Viscount Satake Yoshisato (佐竹 義理; 10 October 1858 – 26 April 1914) was the 9th and final daimyō of Iwasaki Domain (also known as Nitta Domain) in Dewa Province (present day Yuzawa, Akita).

== Biography ==
Satake Yoshisato's father, Satake Yoshitsuma, was the third son of Soma Michitane, the 9th daimyō of Kubota domain. When he married the daughter of Satake Yoshitaka, the 7th daimyo of Iwasaki Domain, he was adopted into the Satake clan and changed his name. He refused to participate in either the Tokugawa armies or in the Ōuetsu Reppan Dōmei in the Boshin War during the Meiji restoration, and was rewarded by the new Meiji government for his neutrality with 2000 gold ryo. He retired in 1869.

Yoshisato became daimyō in May 1869, but the title of daimyō was abolished by the Meiji government the following month, and he became appointive governor of Iwasaki Domain. In 1871, with the abolition of the han system and the merger of the former Iwasaki Domain into the new Akita prefecture, he was left without a position. In 1876, he studied law at the forerunner of the Japanese Ministry of Justice, but quit school due to illness the following year. With the establishment of the kazoku peerage system in 1884, he became a viscount (shishaku). He then served in the House of Peers from 1890. He died in 1914 at age 57; his grave is at the Satake clan cemetery at Itabashi, Tokyo.
