= Satake Yoshihiro =

- 佐竹 義厚
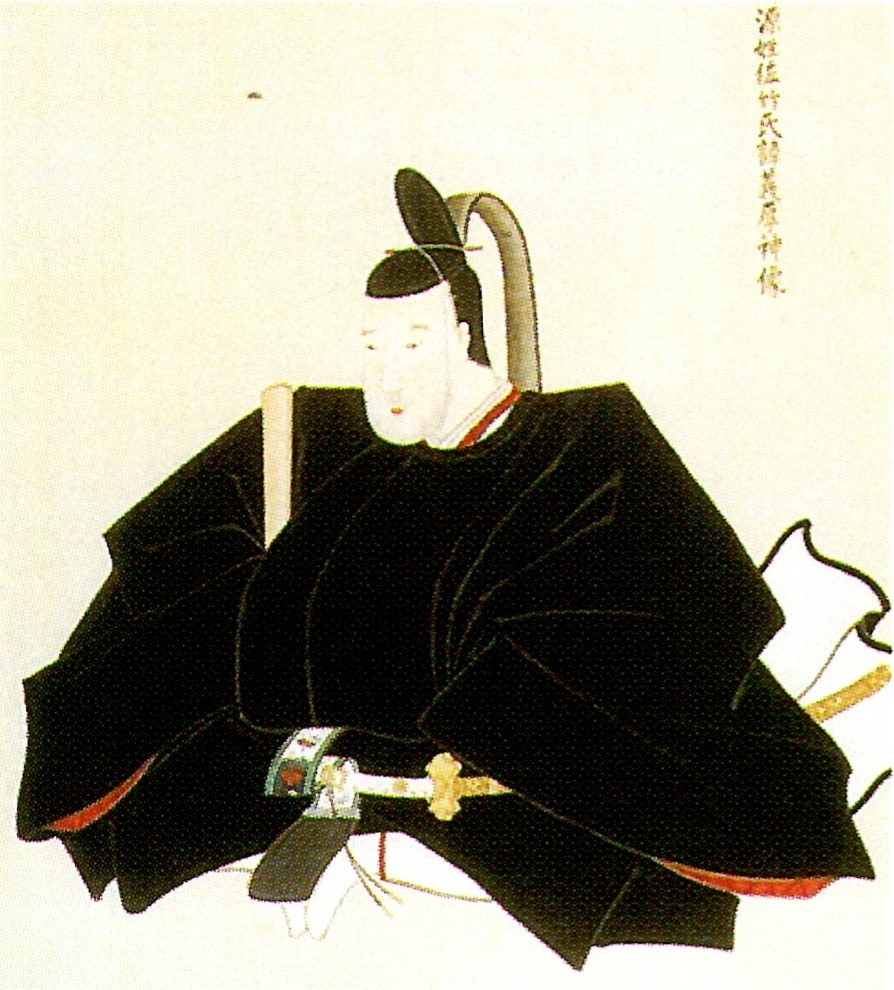
- Portrait at Tentoku-ji, Akita

10th Daimyō of Kubota Domain
- In office 1815–1846
- Monarchs: Shōgun: Tokugawa Ienari; Tokugawa Ieyoshi
- Preceded by: Satake Yoshimasa
- Succeeded by: Satake Yoshichika

Personal details
- Born: August 23, 1812
- Died: October 27, 1846 (aged 34)
- Spouses: (1) Eihime, daughter of Maeda Toshitsuyo of Toyama Domain; (2) Tadahime, daughter of Ikeda Naritoshi of Tottori Domain
- Parent: Satake Yoshimasa (father)

Satake Yoshihiro (佐竹 義厚; August 23, 1812 – October 27, 1846) was the 10th daimyō of Kubota Domain in Dewa Province, Japan (modern-day Akita Prefecture), and the 28th hereditary chieftain of the Satake clan. His courtesy title was Ukyō-no-daifu and Jijū and later raised to Sakonoeshōshō and his Court rank was Junior Fourth Rank, Lower Grade.

== Biography ==
Satake Yoshihiro was the eldest son of Satake Yoshimasa and became daimyō on his father's death in 1815. Although Yoshimasa insisted on his deathbed that be succeeded by the head of Iwasaki Domain due to the extreme youth of Yoshihiro, a number of his senior retainers strenuously objected and insisted that Yoshihiro be recognized as daimyō. He was received in formal audience by Shōgun Tokugawa Ienari in 1824 and his position was confirmed. In 1836, the domain petitioned that he be accorded the courtesy title of Sakonoeshōshō as this had been hereditary to the Satake clan; however, the shōgunate refused, as the previous four generations of Satake daimyō had all died relatively young and had not been awarded the title. The domain petitioned again in 1838, and was successful, albeit at a cost of 2877 ryō.

Although his father Satake Yoshimasu had been a great leader who had made giant steps to reform the domain and its finances, Yoshihiro's youth, inexperience and obsession with a vanity title, combined with repeated crop failures plunged the domain back into massive debt. Although Yoshihiro imposed sumptuary laws, crackdowns on illicit trade and violations of domain monopolies, and land reclamation around the Oga Peninsula, expenses continued to mount due to increasing demands from the shōgunate to bolster Japan's northern defenses. The domain's economic situation continued to deteriorate rather than to improve. Yoshiro died in 1846 at the age of 34.

He was married to Eihime (1812-1840), a daughter of Maeda Toshitsuyo of Toyama Domain, and after her death remarried to Tadahime, a daughter of Ikeda Naritoshi of Tottori Domain.

== See also ==
- Satake clan
