= Satake Yoshimine =

Daimyō of Kubota Domain in Dewa Province and hereditary chieftain of the Satake clan

- 佐竹義峯
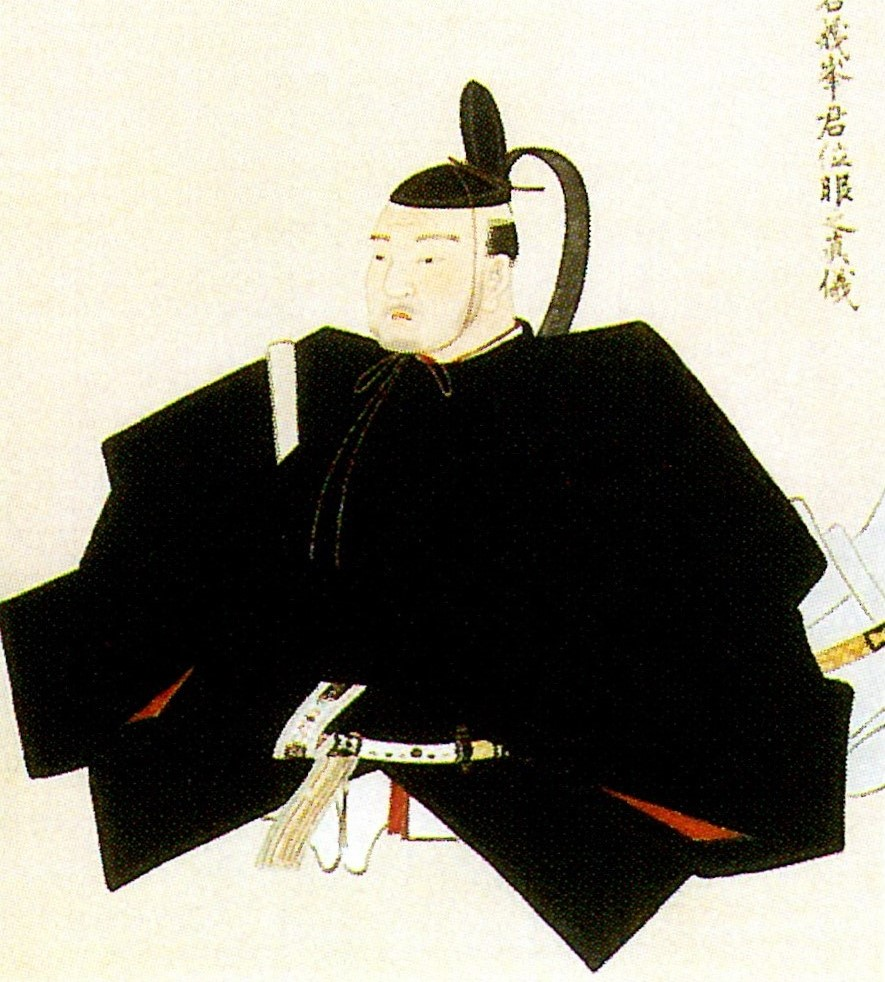
- Satake Yoshimine, portrait at Tentoku-ji, Akita

5th Daimyō of Kubota Domain
- In office 1715–1749
- Monarchs: Shōgun: Tokugawa Ietsuna; Tokugawa Yoshimune; Tokugawa Ieshige
- Preceded by: Satake Yoshitada
- Succeeded by: Satake Yoshimasa (1728-1753)

Personal details
- Born: October 14, 1690
- Died: September 21, 1749 (aged 58)
- Spouse(s): Toshihime, daughter of Kuroda Nagakiyo
- Parent: Satake Yoshinaga (father)

Satake Yoshimine (佐竹義峯; October 14, 1690 – September 21, 1749) was the 5th daimyō of Kubota Domain in Dewa Province, Japan (modern-day Akita Prefecture), and then 23rd hereditary chieftain of the Satake clan. His courtesy title was Ukyō-no-taifu and Jijū, and later Sakonoeshōshō and his Court rank was Junior Fourth Rank, Lower Grade.

== Biography ==
Satake Yoshimine was the second son of Satake Yoshinaga of Iwasaki Domain and thus the grandson of Satake Yoshizumi. His mother was a daughter of Matsura Shigenobu of Hirado Domain. He was initially named Yoshiyuki (義恭). He was received in formal audience by Shōgun Tokugawa Tsunayoshi in 1702. In 1715, he was posthumously adopted by Satake Yoshitada and became daimyō of Kubota. His position was confirmed in an audience with Shōgun Tokugawa Ietsuna later the same year. In 1717, he visited his domain for the first time. His courtesy title was promoted to Sakonoeshōshō in 1744.

The opposite in personality and temperament from his predecessor, he abolished all sumptuary laws and did his utmost to live a life of profligate luxury, driving the domain and even his retainers into the verge of bankruptcy.

Yoshimine was married to a daughter of Kuroda Nagakiyo of a cadet branch of Fukuoka Domain, and had at least two concubines and four daughters; however, he had no male heir, He attempted to adopt Satake Yoshiaki (1723-1758) of Iwasaki Domain as his successor, but this was strenuously opposed by the clan elders, so he adopted Satake Yoshikata (1692-1742) of Kubota-Shinden Domain instead. However, when Yoshikata died in 1742, he was forced to choose another heir and adopted Yoshikata's son Satake Yoshimasa (1728-1753) in his place.

== See also ==
- Satake clan
