= Satake Masayoshi =

Satake Masayoshi (佐竹 昌義, 1081–1147?) was a Japanese samurai of the Heian period. The grandson of Minamoto no Yoshimitsu, Masayoshi was a resident of Hitachi Province. He was killed in battle by Minamoto no Yoshikuni around 1147. Masayoshi was the founder of the Satake clan.
