= Satake Yoshinobu =

Japanese daimyō (1570–1633)

- 佐竹 義宣
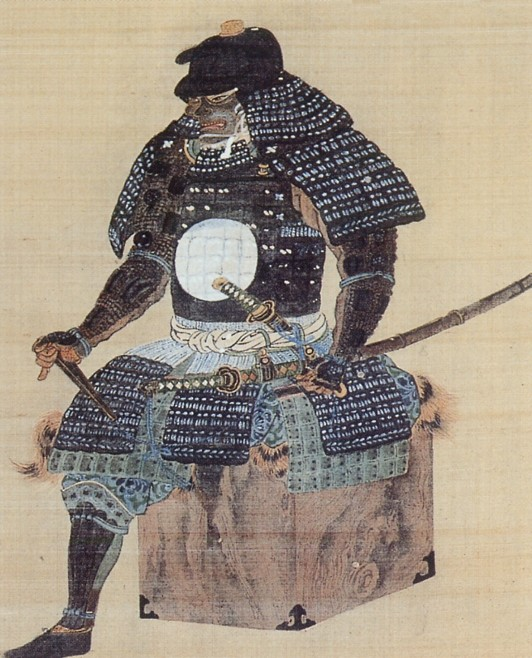
- Portrait at Tentoku-ji, Akita

Head of Satake clan
- In office 1589–1633
- Preceded by: Satake Yoshishige
- Succeeded by: Satake Yoshitaka

1st Daimyō of Kubota Domain
- In office 1602–1633
- Monarchs: Shōgun: Tokugawa Ieyasu; Tokugawa Hidetada; Tokugawa Iemitsu
- Preceded by: -none-
- Succeeded by: Satake Yoshitaka

Personal details
- Born: August 17, 1570 Hitachi Province, Japan
- Died: March 5, 1633 (aged 62) Edo, Japan
- Spouse: Shōdō-in
- Parent: Satake Yoshishige (father)

Military service
- Allegiance: Satake clan Toyotomi clan Tokugawa Shogunate
- Unit: Satake clan
- Commands: Kubota Domain
- Battles/wars: Battle of Hitotoribashi (1586); Battle of Suriagehara (1589); Siege of Oshi (1590); Battle of Imafuku (1614)

Satake Yoshinobu (佐竹 義宣; August 17, 1570 – March 5, 1633) was a daimyō in Sengoku period and early Edo period Japan under the Tokugawa shogunate and the 19th head of the Satake clan and 1st daimyō of Kubota Domain in Dewa Province. His courtesy title was Sakon-no-e-shōshō, later Ukyō-dayū and Jijū and his Court rank was Junior Fourth Rank, Upper Grade.

== Biography ==
Yoshinobu was the eldest son of Satake Yoshishige, and his mother was the daughter of Date Harumune, which made him the cousin of Date Masamune. He was born at Ota Castle in Hitachi Province. His early life was that of constant warfare. The Satake clan were fighting the Nasu clan to the north, and as a condition for peace, Yoshinobu was engaged to a daughter of the Nasu clan when he was only three years old. He participated in his first combat at Battle of Hitotoribashi in 1586, just before he turned 15. His father officially retired some time in 1589, turning the portion of clan chieftain over to Yoshinobu. During this period, the clan was threatened from the north by Date Masamune and from the south by Hōjō Ujinao; however, because he quickly pledged allegiance to Toyotomi Hideyoshi during the Siege of Odawara (1590), he was able to retain his landholdings. Under Hideyoshi's banner, he was counted among the six greatest generals of the Toyotomi clan, together with Tokugawa Ieyasu, Maeda Toshiie, Shimazu Yoshihiro, Mōri Terumoto, and Uesugi Kagekatsu. During the siege of Odawara he was also able to extend his control to cover the over the whole of Hitachi Province (with the exception of the territory of the Yūki clan), by defeating various supporters of the Hōjō, so that by the end of the campaign his kokudaka was ranked at over 350,000 koku.

Yoshinobu enjoyed good relations with Ishida Mitsunari, whom he has assisted at the Siege of Oshi in 1590. He relocated his seat to Mito Castle, and contributed a large number of troops to Hideyoshi's subjugation of the Tohoku region, and a much smaller number of troops to Hideyoshi's Korean invasion, although he remained behind at Nagoya Castle and later at Fushimi Castle with Hideyoshi and did not cross over to the continent. Under Hideyoshi, his kokudaka gradually was increased to 545,765 koku.

At the time of the Battle of Sekigahara the Satake clan was ordered by Tokugawa Ieyasu to participate in the campaign to destroy Uesugi Kagekatsu in Aizu and to provide a hostage. The Satake clan was divided, with Satake Yoshishige and many of the samurai strongly supporting Ieyasu and the Eastern Army, whereas Yoshinobu was hesitant, based on his long ties with Ishida Mitsunari and a secret treaty with the Uesugi clan. Instead of sending his army, he sent a small number of horsemen as reinforcements to Tokugawa Hidetada's attack on the Sanada clan, but for the most part remained in Mito attempting to stay neutral in the conflict. With the victory of the pro-Tokugawa forces at the Battle of Sekigahara and the subsequent establishment of the Tokugawa shogunate, the Satake clan was punished by a reduction in their kokudaka to 180,000 koku, and by being ordered to surrender their ancestral home territory in Hitachi Province for the new Kubota Domain, in Dewa Province. The Satake clan also was a direct descendant of the Minamoto clan and thus had a more legitimate hereditary claim to the title of shōgun than the Tokugawa clan, which was another reason why Tokugawa Ieyasu viewed the clan with suspicion and as a potential threat.

After arriving at their new domain in 1603, the Satake immediately had to face a rebellion of local rōnin loyal to Onodera Yoshimichi, the former master of the region, which they defeated relatively quickly. Subsequently, Yoshinobu took steps to gain favor with the new Tokugawa government by actively participating in the Siege of Osaka, fighting Toyotomi commanders such as Kimura Shigenari and Gotō Matabei at the Battle of Imafuku.

Yoshinobu was married to Shōdō-in, the daughter of Nasu Suketane, to whom he had been engaged as a child. After her death, he remarried to a daughter of Tagaya Shigetsune of Shimotsuma Domain. He had no children by the first wife and both sons of the second marriage died in infancy. He also had a concubine, the daughter of Ashina Morioki. Yoshinobu adopted two sons as possible heirs. The eldest was the 5th son of Satake Yoshishige, Satake Yoshinao (1612-1656), who at the age of 14, fell asleep during a sarugaki performance at Edo Castle, and was thus disinherited. he later became a monk. The younger was Satake Yoshitaka, the son of Iwaki Sadataka of Kameda Domain, who became his successor. Yoshinobu died at the domain's Edo residence in Kanda in 1633.

== Bibliography ==
- Saga, Jun'ichi (1987). Memories of Silk and Straw: A Self-Portrait of Small-Town Japan. New York: Kodansha International.
- Turnbull, Stephen (2010). Hatamoto. Samurai Horse and Foot Guards 1540–1724. Oxford: Osprey Publishing. ISBN 978-184603-478-7.
