= Satake Yoshiatsu =

Japanese daimyō (1748–1785)

- 佐竹 義敦
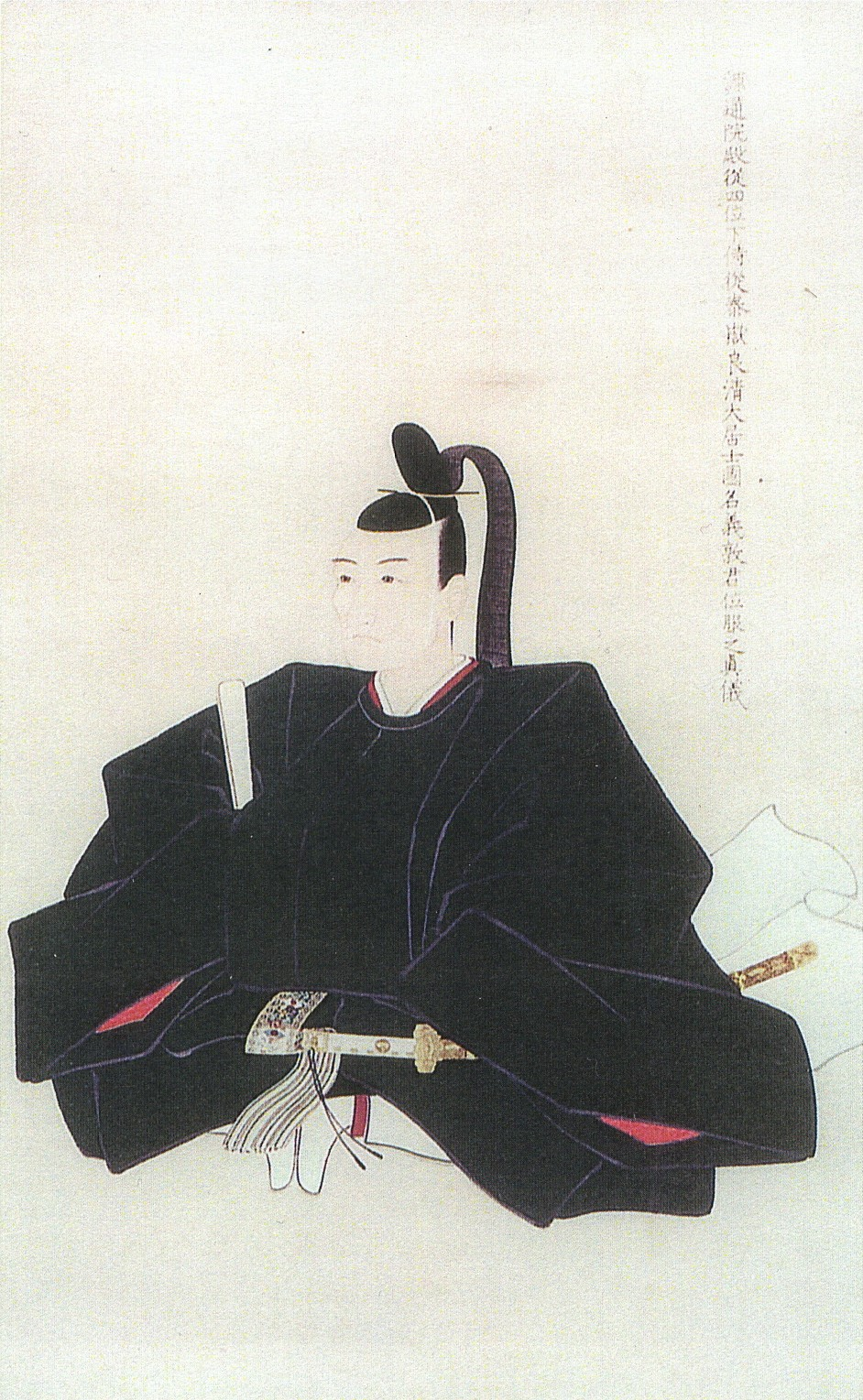
- Satake Yoshiatsu, portrait at Tentoku-ji, Akita

8th Daimyō of Kubota Domain
- In office 1758–1785
- Monarchs: Shōgun: Tokugawa Ieshige; Tokugawa Ieharu
- Preceded by: Satake Yoshiharu
- Succeeded by: Satake Yoshimasa

Personal details
- Born: November 24, 1748
- Died: July 6, 1785 (aged 36)
- Spouse: daughter of Yamauchi Toyonobu of Tosa Domain
- Parent: Satake Yoshiharu (father)

Satake Yoshiatsu (佐竹 義敦; November 24, 1748 – July 6, 1785) was the 8th daimyō of Kubota Domain in Dewa Province, Japan (modern-day Akita Prefecture), and then 26th hereditary chieftain of the Satake clan. His courtesy title was Ukyo-daifu and Jijū and his Court rank was Junior Fourth Rank, Lower Grade. He was also founder of the Akita ranga school of Japanese painting and is more commonly known by his pen name, Satake Shozan (佐竹 曙山).

== Biography ==
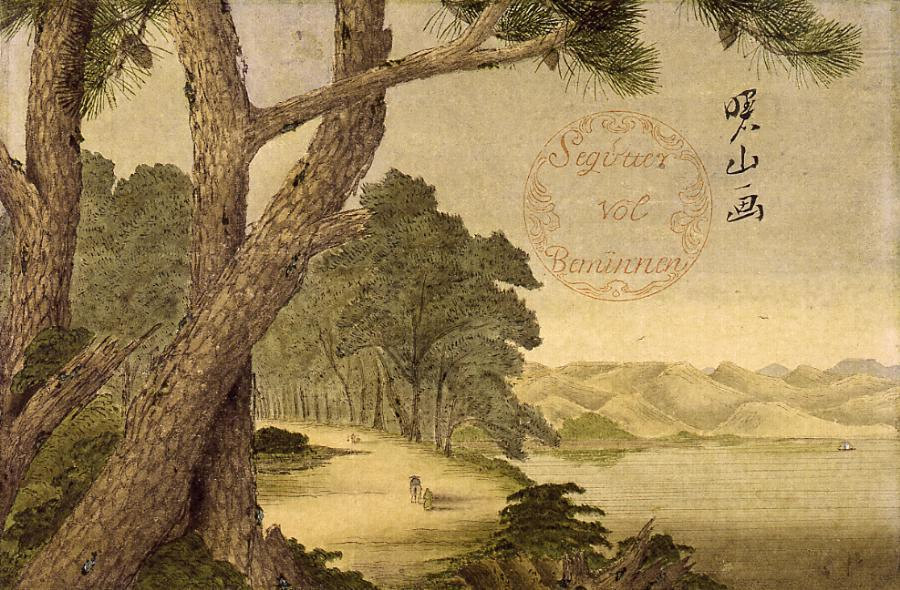
湖山風景図 (The Lake and Mountain） - painting on silk by Satake Shozan

Satake Yoshiatsu was the eldest son of Satake Yoshiharu and was born at the domain's Edo residence. He became daimyō on his father's death in 1758. He was received in formal audience by Shogun Tokugawa Ieharu in 1763 and made his first visit to his domain in 1765. The domain had been devastated by years of crop failures, peasant uprisings, plots among his retainers and fiscal mismanagement by his predecessors. Yoshiatsu sought to escape this reality through art, and was a member of a painting coterie which included fellow daimyō Yamauchi Toyochika of Tosa Domain and Shimazu Shigehide of Satsuma Domain. At the time, the Kanō school of painting was considered orthodoxy, and painting was regarded as a "gentleman's hobby"; however, Yoshiatsu devoted all of his time and efforts into painting, developing a new style which combined western techniques with Japanese themes. Along with his retainer Odano Naotake, he produced a number of paintings in the Dutch style and in 1778, he wrote the Gahō Kōryō (画 法 綱領), the first work on western painting to be written in Japan. He was also a student of rangaku (Dutch studies) scholar Hiraga Gennai, whom he had invited to Akita to advise him on management of the domain's copper mines (Akita was the primary source of copper in the Japanese archipelago during this period).

He died in 1785, at the young age of 38. He was married to a daughter of Yamauchi Toyonobu of Tosa Domain and at least three concubines, by whom he had four sons and six daughters.

== See also ==
- Satake clan
