= Yokote Castle =

Coordinates: 39°19′16″N 140°34′10″E

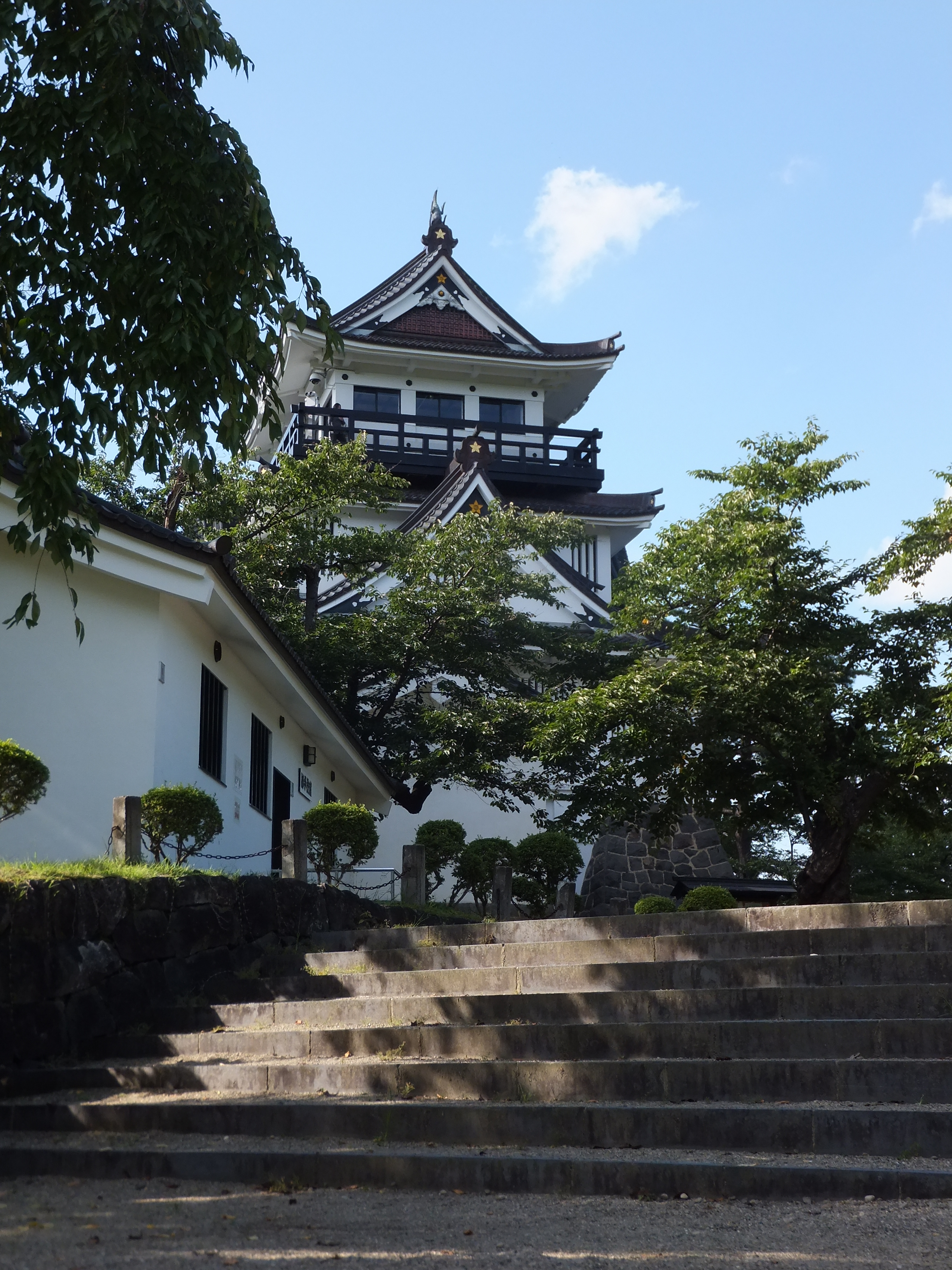

Yokote Castle was built by the Onodera clan in 1550, in Akita prefecture.

While it was constructed in 1500s, it's believed there were fortifications on site before that. The castle was of a modest size, consisting mainly of two features: the main enclosure and the secondary, Ninomaru.

It was burnt down in the Boshin War.

== Present site ==
There is a reconstruction of the keep, built in 1965, on the present site, in the main enclosure.
