= Satake Yoshizumi =

Japanese daimyō and clan chieftain

- 佐竹義処
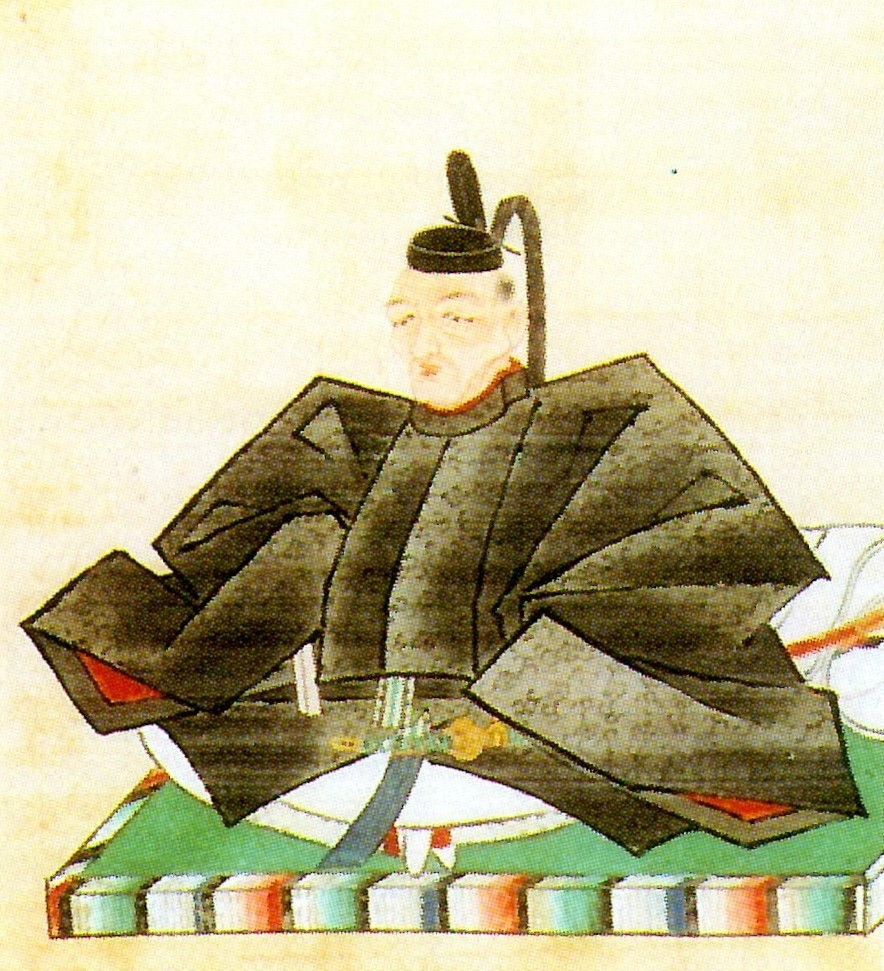
- Satake Yoshizumi, portrait at Tentoku-ji, Akita

3rd Daimyō of Kubota Domain
- In office 1672–1703
- Monarchs: Shōgun: Tokugawa Ietsuna; Tokugawa Tsunayoshi
- Preceded by: Satake Yoshitaka
- Succeeded by: Satake Yoshitada

Personal details
- Born: October 9, 1637
- Died: August 5, 1703 (aged 65) Yokote Castle, Dewa Province
- Spouse(s): Tsuruhime, the daughter of Matsudaira Naomasa of Matsue Domain
- Parent: Satake Yoshitaka (father)

Satake Yoshizumi (佐竹義処; October 9, 1637 – August 5, 1703) was the 3rd daimyō of Kubota Domain in Dewa Province, Japan (modern-day Akita Prefecture), and then 21st hereditary chieftain of the Satake clan. His courtesy title was Ukyō-no-daifu and Jijū, and later raised to Sakon'e-shōshō and his Court rank was Junior Fourth Rank, Lower Grade.

== Biography ==
Satake Yoshizumi was the younger son of Satake Yoshitaka. In 1646, he was presented in formal audience to Shōgun Tokugawa Iemitsu and confirmed as heir to Kubota Domain. he became daimyō on his father's retirement in 1672. In 1701, he divided 20,000 koku of the domain as a fief for his brother, Satake Yoshinaga, and another 10,000 koku for his nephew, Satake Yoshikuni, creating two sub-domains: Iwasaki Domain and Kubota-Shinden Domain. Kubota-Shinden Domain was reabsorbed back into Kubota Domain in 1732, but Iwasaki Domain lasted until the Meiji restoration as a cadet house of the Satake clan.

In 1703, Satake Yoshizumi died at Yokote Castle. It was said that he often forgot the eat or sleep, and sometimes vomited blood, as he worked tirelessly for the benefit of the domain.

Satake Yoshizumi was wed to Tsuruhime, the daughter of Matsudaira Naomasa of Matsue Domain, but his only son, Satake Yoshimitsu died in 1699. His second son had been adopted by the Sōma clan and was now Sōma Nobutane, daimyo of Sōma Domain, so Kubota Domain was inherited by his third son by a concubine, Satake Yoshitada.

== See also ==
- Satake clan
