= Satake clan =

Japanese samurai family

Satake clan 佐竹氏
- Family crest of the Satake clan
- Home province: Hitachi Province
- Parent house: Minamoto clan
- Titles: Various
- Founder: Satake Masayoshi
- Final ruler: Satake Yoshitaka
- Current head: Satake Norihisa
- Founding year: 12th century
- Dissolution: still extant
- Ruled until: 1873 (Abolition of the han system)
- Cadet branches: Iwasaki, Kubota-Shinden, others.

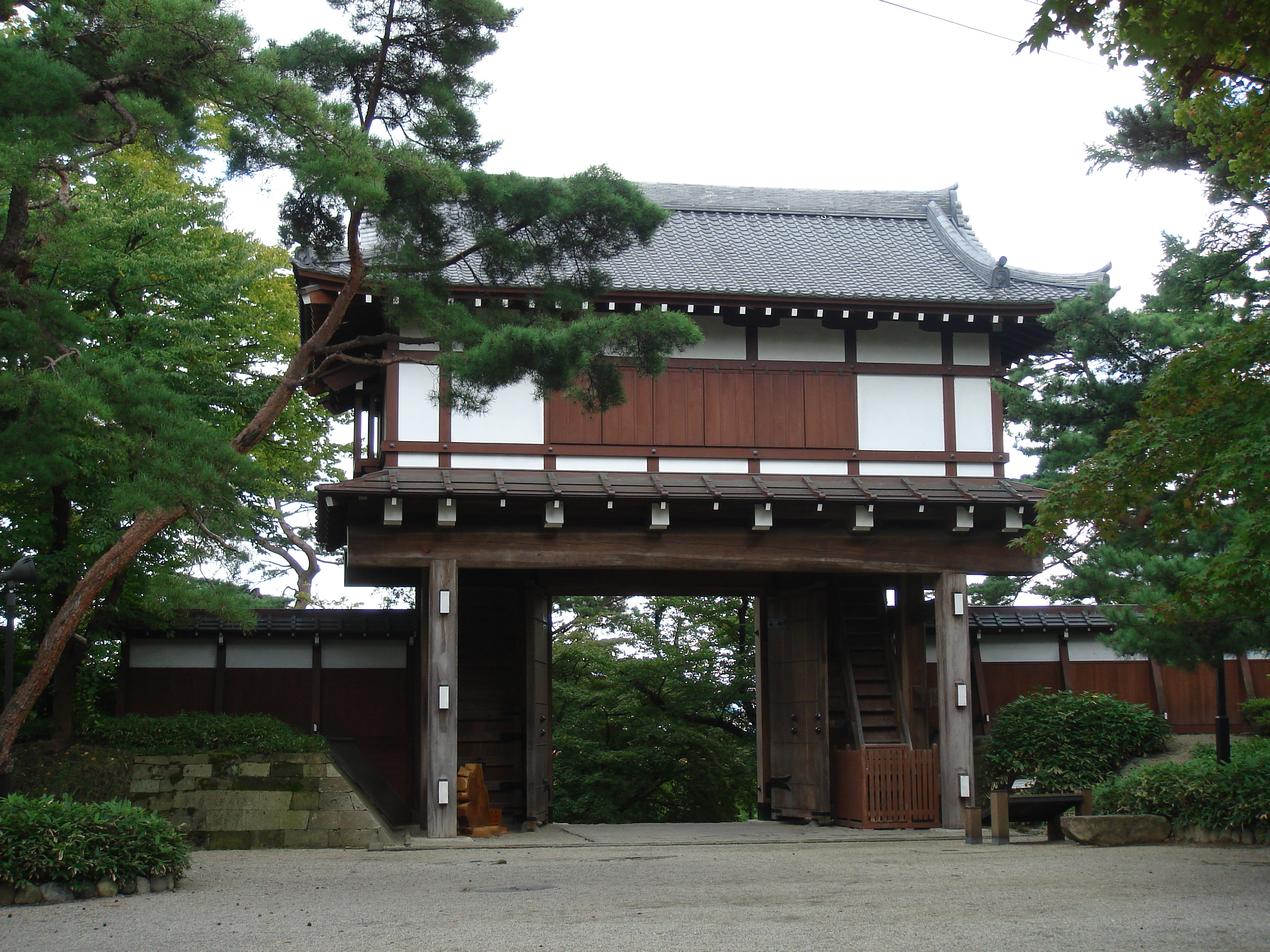
Gate of Kubota Castle, Edo-era seat of the Satake family's fief of Kubota

The Satake clan (佐竹氏, Satake-shi) was a Japanese samurai clan that claimed descent from the Minamoto clan. Its first power base was in Hitachi Province. The clan was subdued by Minamoto no Yoritomo in the late 12th century, but later entered Yoritomo's service as vassals. In the Muromachi period, the Satake served as Governor (shugo) of Hitachi Province (today Ibaraki Prefecture), under the aegis of the Ashikaga shogunate. The clan sided with the Western Army during the Battle of Sekigahara, and was punished by Tokugawa Ieyasu, who moved it to a smaller territory in northern Dewa Province (northern Honshū) at the start of the Edo period. The Satake survived as lords (daimyō) of the Kubota Domain (also known as the Akita Domain). Over the course of the Edo period, two major branches of the Satake clan were established, one ruled the fief of Iwasaki, the other one the fief of Kubota-Shinden.

During the Boshin War of 1868–69, the Satake were signatories to the pact that formed the Ōuetsu Reppan Dōmei, but after internal debate and a disagreement with the Sendai Domain, the clan switched sides and joined the imperial forces in subduing the alliance. As with all other daimyō families, the Satake clan was relieved of its title in 1871.

== Origins ==
The Satake clan claimed descent from Satake Masayoshi, the grandson of the prominent 11th century warrior Minamoto no Yoshimitsu. Yoshimitsu received land in Mutsu Province and Hitachi Province as a reward for his military service, and took up residence at Satake village, in Hitachi. Yoshimitsu willed the territory around Satake village to his son, Yoshinobu. Yoshinobu, in turn, passed it on to his own son, Masayoshi. The Satake clan would remain in Hitachi until they were ordered to move in 1602. In 1106, Masayoshi led a rebellion against Minamoto no Yoshikuni, a power figure in neighboring Shimotsuke Province, but was defeated and killed by Yoshikuni, who followed him back to Hitachi. During the Genpei War, Masayoshi's son Takayoshi sided with Taira no Kiyomori. The Satake clan was defeated by Minamoto no Yoritomo in 1180, and its territory confiscated; it was not until nine years later that Yoritomo forgave Takayoshi's son Hideyoshi, and allowed Hideyoshi to become his vassal. Hideyoshi served in the attack on Mutsu Province. The Satake clan later returned to its old territory in Hitachi.

== Muromachi and Sengoku periods ==
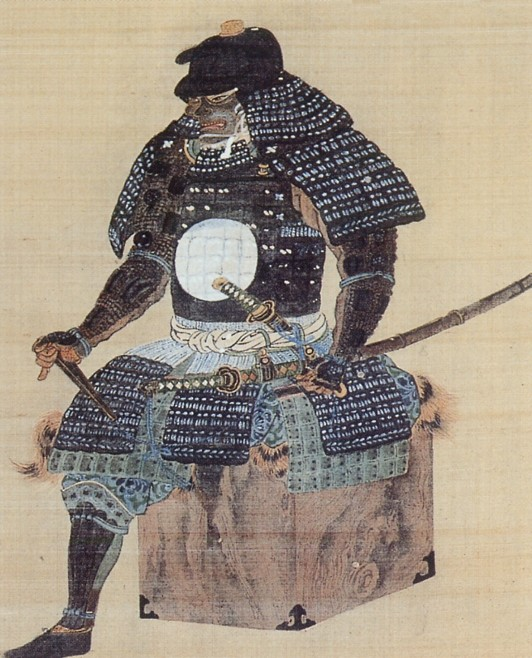
Image of an armored Satake Yoshinobu, prominent Sengoku-era Satake clan head

In the Muromachi period (1336–1573), the Satake family's heads served as hereditary governors (shugo) of Hitachi Province. They were vassals of the Ashikaga shogunate's Kamakura-kubō, the Kamakura-based official who oversaw the Ashikaga shogunate's affairs in the Kantō region. The Satake clan saw a great deal of military service under the Ashikaga banner.

In the Sengoku period, the Satake worked toward unifying the often rebellious clans of the Hitachi region under their control. Satake Yoshishige, family head during the early Sengoku period, was renowned for his ferocity in battle; he was also known by the nickname of "Ogre Yoshishige" (鬼義重, Oni Yoshishige). He often fought against the Later Hōjō clan, who were extending their power into southern Hitachi. One such encounter was the Battle of Numajiri, where 20,000 men under Yoshishige fought 80,000 Hōjō troops. The Satake won, due in part to the use of over 8600 matchlock guns by their troops.

In 1586 and again in 1589, the Satake also fought with the Date clan at Sukagawa, but were ultimately defeated by forces under the command of Date Masamune.

In 1590, under the headship of Yoshishige's son Satake Yoshinobu, the Satake clan pledged fealty to Toyotomi Hideyoshi during the siege of Odawara. After the fall of Odawara, Hideyoshi accepted them as vassals, and guaranteed their lordship of a 540,000 koku swath of territory in Hitachi Province. Having received recognition from Hideyoshi as the ruler of Hitachi Province, Yoshinobu's drive for unifying the province under his rule was strengthened. He brought nearly all of the province under his control, with the exception of the Tsuchiura and Shimodate areas, the control of which Hideyoshi had assured to the Yūki clan.

In 1593, the Satake clan joined in Hideyoshi's invasion of Korea, deploying troops to Nagoya Castle in Hizen Province.

== Edo era ==
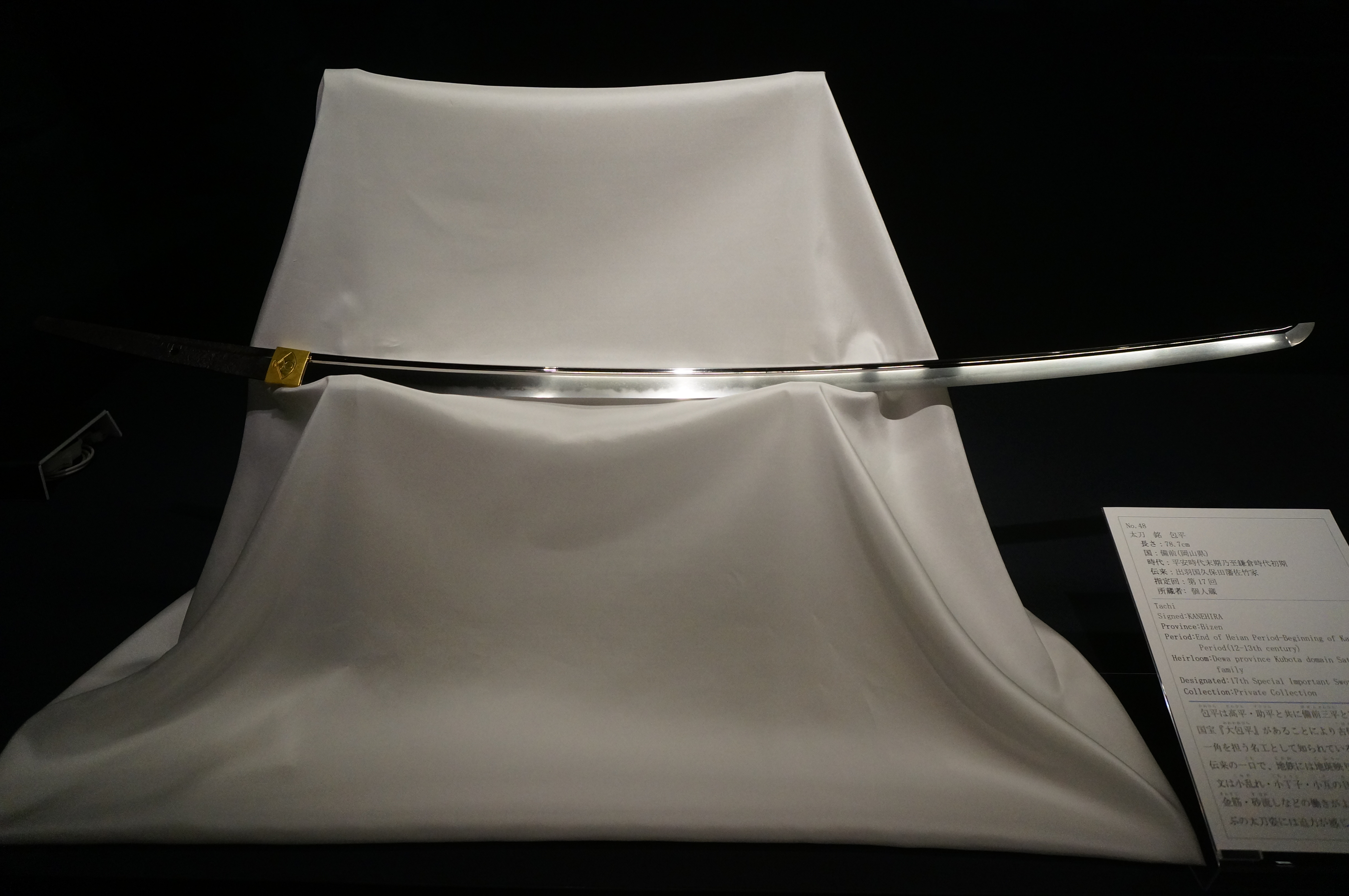
A tachi made by Kanehira in the 12th century. It was a treasure of the Satake clan in Kubota Domain and a fan as a family crest was engraved on the habaki. It is designated as a Special Important Sword by NBHTK.

In 1600, the Satake sided with the Western Army at the Battle of Sekigahara, and were discovered to be in secret communication with Ishida Mitsunari, the leader of the Western Army. After the Western Army's defeat by the Eastern forces of Tokugawa Ieyasu, the Satake clan was allowed to remain where they were in Hitachi but they would be punished by the victorious Tokugawa. The clan's income was severely reduced and in 1602 the clan was ordered to relocate to Kubota, a much smaller fief in northern Japan, where they remained until 1871.

Kubota's income level was 205,000 koku, and it was classified as an outside (tozama) daimyō. The income level remained constant throughout its history. The domain often had agricultural crises, which resulted in several peasant uprisings throughout the course of its history. It was also beset by an internal o-ie sōdō conflict, the Satake disturbance (佐竹騒動, Satake-sōdō), which was brought on by financial issues.

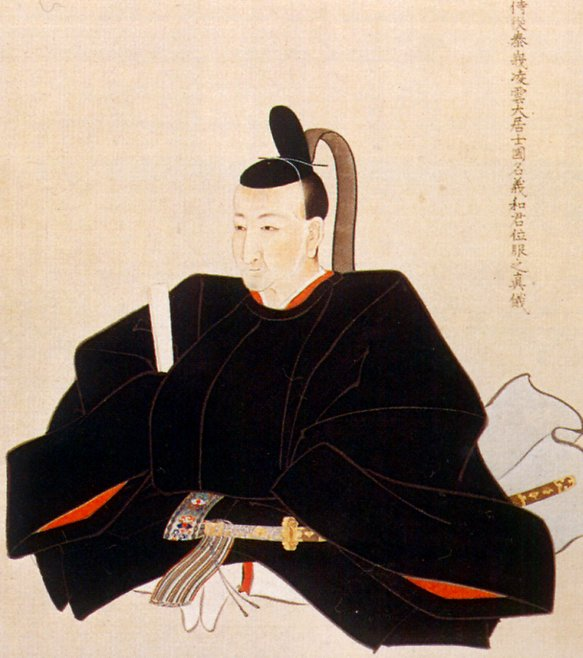
Satake Yoshimasa, 9th generation lord of Kubota

Satake Yoshiatsu (better known by his nom-de-plume Satake Shozan), the 8th generation lord of Kubota, was an accomplished artist. Yoshiatsu painted a number of paintings in the Dutch style, and also produced three treatises on European painting techniques, including the depiction of perspective. He was also a student of Dutch studies (rangaku) scholar Hiraga Gennai, who he had invited up to Akita to advise him on management of the domain's copper mines. It was during Yoshiatsu's lifetime that the Akita school (秋田派, Akita-ha) of art was born and briefly flourished.

The Kubota domain was uncommon in that it contained more than one castle, despite the Tokugawa shogunate's "one castle per domain" rule. The main castle was Kubota Castle, but there were also castles at Yokote and Ōdate, and five fortified estates elsewhere in the domain: Kakudate, Yuzawa, Hiyama, Jūniso, and In'nai. Each of these was given to a senior retainer who ran it as his own small castle town. The senior retainers had personal retainers who resided in these castle towns.

Two of the clan elder (karō) families serving the Kubota domain were branches of the Satake family. One was the North Satake family (Satake-hokke), stipended at 10,000 koku; the other the West Satake family (Satake-nishike), stipended at 7200 koku. The North Satake family had its landholdings around Kakunodate, one of the fortified estates mentioned above; the West Satake resided in and had their landholdings around Ōdate. Another karō family unrelated to the Satake was the Tomura, who held Yokote castle.

During its rule over Kubota, the Satake clan was ranked as a Province-holding daimyō (国持ち大名, kunimochi daimyō) family, and as such, had the privilege of shogunal audiences in the Great Hall (Ohiroma) of Edo Castle. Though no Satake lord ever held the office of shōgun, the clan (together with many of the other domains of northern Honshū) assisted the shogunate in policing the frontier region of Ezochi (now Hokkaido).

== Boshin war ==
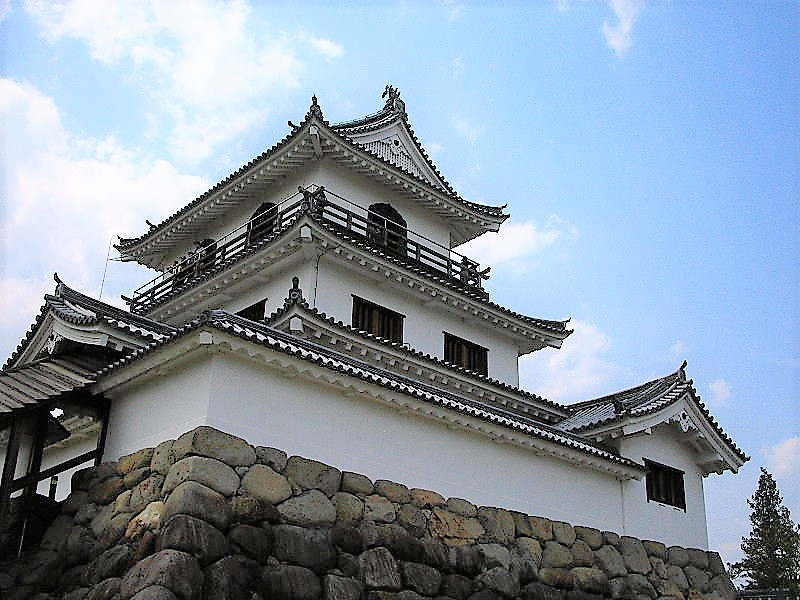
Shiroishi Castle, the headquarters of the Ōuetsu Reppan Dōmei

After the restoration of imperial rule in late 1867, the Boshin War broke out in early 1868, pitting the coalition of southern domains against the forces of the former Tokugawa shogunate. After the city of Edo fell, remnants of the Tokugawa forces retreated northward, and the fighting followed northward. The Satake clan was a signatory to the pact that formed the Ōuetsu Reppan Dōmei, the alliance of anti-Satchō northern domains led by the Sendai Domain. The Satake clan's delegation at Shiroishi, the alliance's headquarters, was led by the clan elder (karō) Tomura Yoshiari. However, the Satake had political difficulties with the alliance, which culminated in the murder, in Akita, of a delegation from Sendai on August 21, 1868, and the display of the messengers' gibbeted heads in the Akita castle town. The Sendai delegation, led by Shimo Matazaemon, was dispatched to request the Akita domain to hand over Kujō Michitaka and other officials of the imperial delegation that had been originally sent to the region to gather support for the imperial cause. The Satake then backed out of the alliance and supported the imperial army; eleven days later, on September 1, 1868 the Tsugaru clan of the neighboring Hirosaki domain followed suit. In response, the pro-alliance domains of Morioka and Ichinoseki sent troops to attack Kubota. Kubota forces were hard-pressed to defend their territory, with the result that the alliance troops had made serious advances before the war's end; Yokote Castle was burned, and by October 7, Morioka troops took Ōdate, the last of the Akita domain's castles. In early 1869, Satake Yoshitaka formally gave up the domain's registers to the imperial government, and was made imperial governor of the Akita domain (han chiji). In mid-1869, the imperial government rewarded the service rendered by the main line of the Satake clan, by raising its income by 20,000 koku. The heads of all the Satake clan's branches were relieved of office as daimyō in 1871, and ordered to relocate to Tokyo.

== Meiji and beyond ==
In the Meiji era, Satake Yoshitaka was ennobled with the title of marquess (kōshaku). Satake Yoshisato of Iwasaki received the title of viscount (shishaku). The North Satake family received the title of baron (danshaku).

Yoshitaka's son Yoshinao served in the Imperial Japanese Army, and fought in the Satsuma Rebellion.

Norihisa Satake, the former governor of Akita Prefecture, is a descendant of the North Satake branch of the clan.

== Family Heads ==
=== Hitachi ===
As lord of the Hitachi Province

- Satake Masayoshi (1081-1147)
- Satake Takayoshi
- Satake Hideyoshi
- Satake Yoshiaki (1531-1565)
- Satake Yoshishige (1547-1612)

=== Kubota ===
As lord of the Kubota Domain

- Satake Yoshinobu (1570–1633)
- Satake Yoshitaka (1609–1672)
- Satake Yoshizumi (1637–1703)
- Satake Yoshitada (1695–1715)
- Satake Yoshimine (1690–1745)
- Satake Yoshimasa (1728–1753)
- Satake Yoshiharu (1723–1758)
- Satake Yoshiatsu (1748–1785)
- Satake Yoshimasa (1775–1815)
- Satake Yoshihiro (1812–1846)
- Satake Yoshichika (1839–1857)
- Satake Yoshitaka (1825–1884, last lord of Kubota)
- Satake Yoshinao (1854–1893)

=== Iwasaki ===
- Satake Yoshinaga (1655–1741)
- Satake Yoshimichi (1701–1765)
- Satake Yoshitada (1730–1787)
- Satake Yoshimoto (1759–1793)
- Satake Yoshichika (1787–1821)
- Satake Yoshizumi (1802–1856)
- Satake Yoshizane (1825–1884; became Satake Yoshitaka, last lord of Akita)
- Satake Yoshitsuma (1837–1870)
- Satake Yoshisato (1858–1914)

=== Kubota-Shinden ===
- Satake Yoshikuni (1665–1725)
- Satake Yoshikata (1692–1742)

== Notable Retainers ==
- Makabe Ujimoto (1550–1622)
- Onuki Yorihisa (1544–1603)
- Oba Yoshinari
- Oba Tadanobu
- Tomura Yoshikuni (Jūdayū)
- Wada Akitame (1532–1618)

== See also ==
- Boshin War
- Tsugaru clan
- Hitachi Province
