= Kubota Castle =

Coordinates: 39°43′24.53″N 140°7′23.67″E

Kubota Castle 久保田城
- Akita, Akita Prefecture, Japan
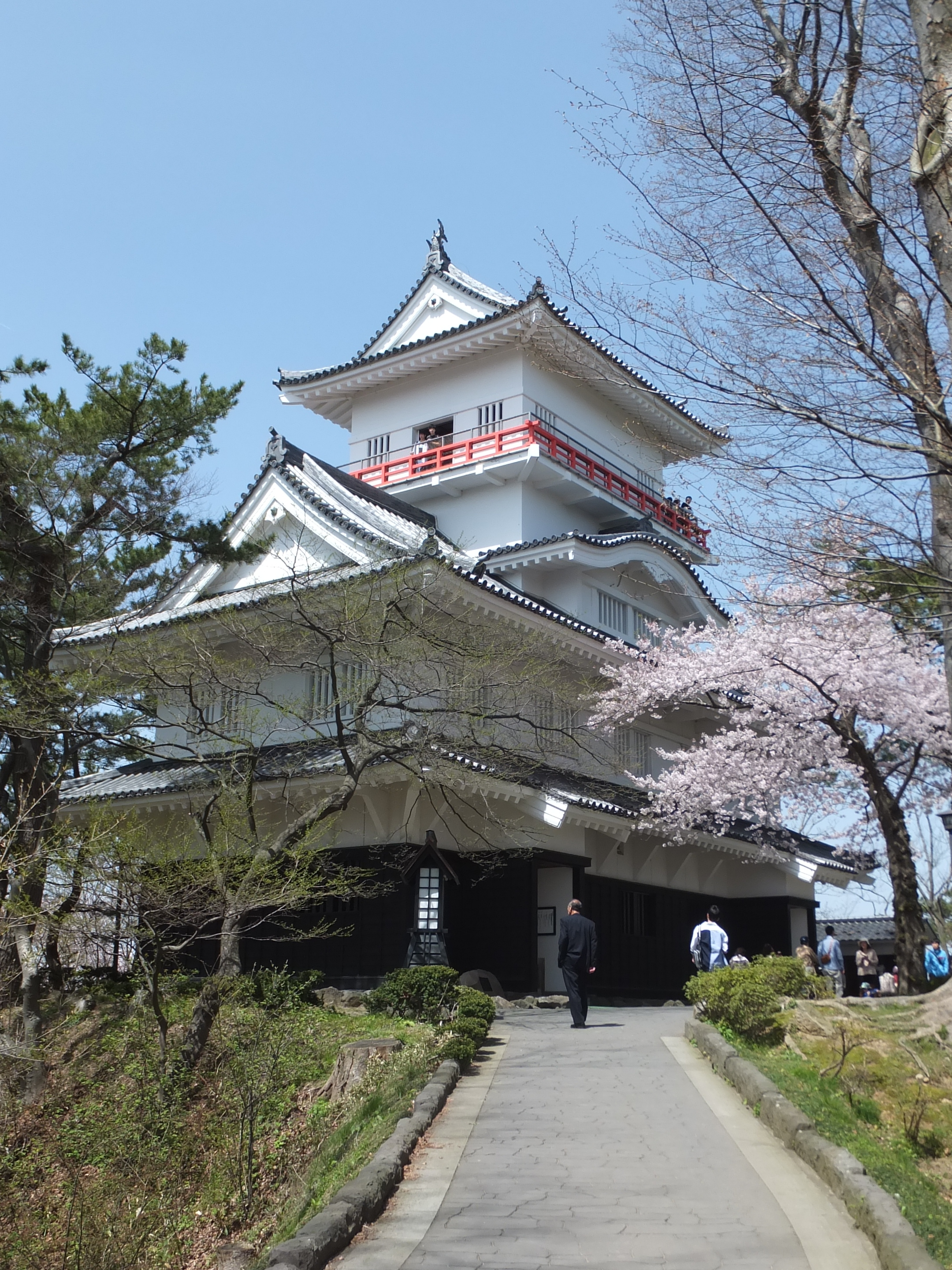
- Reconstructed Corner Turret of Kubota Castle

Site information
- Type: hirayama-style Japanese castle
- Open to the public: yes
- Condition: partly reconstructed 1989

Location
- Location within Akita Prefecture Location within Japan

Site history
- Built: 1604
- Built by: Satake Yoshinobu
- In use: Edo period-1889

Kubota Castle (久保田城, Kubota-jō) is a Japanese castle in Akita, Akita Prefecture, Japan. Throughout the Edo period, Kubota Castle was home to the Satake clan, daimyō of Kubota Domain, rulers of northern Dewa Province. The castle was also known as "Yadome-jō" (矢留城) or "Kuzune-jō" (葛根城). In the official documents of the Tokugawa shogunate, the castle was called "Akita-jō" (秋田城), although this name is now more commonly used to refer to the Nara period fortified settlement of Akita Castle which was nearby.

== Situation ==
Kubota Castle is a hirayama-style Japanese castle, built on a 40-metre (130 ft) hill on the left bank of the Nibetsu River (Asahi River), a tributary of the Omono River, incorporating the river and adjacent wetlands into its defenses. The main bailey was protected by a system of wet moats, earthenworks and eight yagura watchtowers; however, the castle made very little use of stone walls, which were not common in Hitachi Province, the previous homeland of the Satake clan. The castle also never had an imposing main keep, possibly to prevent attracting unwelcome suspicion from the Tokugawa shogunate.

== History ==
=== As Kubota Castle ===
Satake Yoshinobu was reassigned to Dewa Province from the clan's ancestral territories by Tokugawa Ieyasu in 1602, and arrived at the site of the Minato Castle in Tsuchizaki on September 17 of the same year. Work began immediately on the new castle, with Yoshinobu taking up residence in the castle on August 28, 1604, and a surrounding castle town laid out. The town continued a planned expansion in 1607, 1619, 1629 and 1631 with a system of streets and moats. However, the castle burned down in a fire on September 21, 1633, during the tenure of Satake Yoshitaka. It was restored in 1635. The name "Kubota Castle" appears for the first time in official documents dated 1647.

Much of the castle town, as well as several castle gates and the daimyō palace, burned down in a fire on April 2, 1776. The main bailey was destroyed during a subsequent fire caused by a lightning strike on July 10, 1778. Repairs were completed by May 24, 1781. However, another fire on May 10, 1797 destroyed the northern keep, two yagura, two barracks and numerous minor buildings.

During the Boshin War of the Meiji Restoration in 1868, after some vacillation, the Kubota clan supported the new Meiji government and as a result came under attack by the forces of the Ōuetsu Reppan Dōmei, especially the forces from neighboring Shōnai Domain. After the end of the war, the castle was surrendered by the Satake clan to the new government on June 17, 1869. With the abolition of the han system in 1871, Kubota Domain was dissolved into Akita Prefecture, and Kubota Castle became the Prefectural Office. Following the relocation of the Akita Prefectural Office on March 13, 1872, the castle was abandoned. Subsequently, most of its moats were filled in to widen city streets, and most of its minor structures were pulled down for scrap. On July 21, 1880 a fire broke out in the abandoned main bailey, and destroyed it and most of the remaining structures. Only one small guardpost in the second bailey, the Omonogashira Gobansho, survived the fire; it was designated a Tangible Cultural Property of Akita City on April 10, 1990. One of the remaining gates was removed to a local Buddhist temple in 1886. In 1890, the government returned the barren castle site back to the Satake clan, which subsequently donated the site of the main bailey and second bailey to Akita City for use as a park.

=== As Senshu Park ===
The Akita city government planted it with 1170 sakura trees in 1892 and built a Shinto shrine on the site of the Main Bailey. However, the city turned the park over to the Akita prefectural government in 1896, who contracted noted garden designer Nagaoka Yasuhei to lay out a new garden. renaming the site as Senshu Kōen (千秋公園). A Hachiman shrine was completed in the grounds in 1907 (the shrine burned down in 2005 and was rebuilt in 2007) and the Iyataka Jinja, a shrine dedicated to Hirata Atsutane. A number of civic buildings, including the Akita City Library, Akita Civic Center, Akita Museum of Art and forerunner of the Akita Omoriyama Zoo were built on the site. In 1984, the Satake clan donated the remaining 14.6 hectares of the former castle site to Akita City.

=== Present day ===
One of the corner yagura of the castle was reconstructed in 1989 to boost local tourism. It contains a small history museum. The front gate of the castle was reconstructed under a two-year project begun in 1999 and completed in fiscal year 2000. The castle was listed as one of the 100 Fine Castles of Japan by the Japanese Castle Foundation (日本城郭協会, Nihon Jōkaku Kyōkai) in 2006.

The site also contains the Satake Historical Material Museum, dedicated to the history of the Satake clan, and the former Kurosawa House, an Edo period samurai house, relocated to the park in 1988. The former Kurosawa House is registered as a national Important Cultural Property.

== Literature ==
- Schmorleitz, Morton S. (1974). Castles in Japan. Tokyo: Charles E. Tuttle Co. pp. 144–145. ISBN 0-8048-1102-4.
- De Lange, William (2021). An Encyclopedia of Japanese Castles. Groningen: Toyo Press. p. 600. ISBN 978-9492722300.
- Motoo, Hinago (1986). Japanese Castles. Tokyo: Kodansha. p. 200 pages. ISBN 0-87011-766-1.
- Mitchelhill, Jennifer (2004). Castles of the Samurai: Power and Beauty. Tokyo: Kodansha. p. 112 pages. ISBN 4-7700-2954-3.
- Turnbull, Stephen (2003). Japanese Castles 1540-1640. Osprey Publishing. p. 64 pages. ISBN 1-84176-429-9.
- Screech, Timon (2000). The Shogun's Painted Culture: Fear and Creativity in the Japanese States. Reaktion. ISBN 1861890648.
