= List of cultural properties of Japan – paintings (Akita) =

This list is of the cultural properties of Japan designated in the category of paintings (絵画, kaiga) for the Prefecture of Akita.

== National Cultural Properties ==
As of 1 July 2019, four Important Cultural Properties have been designated, being of national significance.

| Property | Date | Municipality | Ownership | Comments | Image | Dimensions | Coordinates | Ref. |
|---|---|---|---|---|---|---|---|---|
| Exotic bird in a pine, colour on silk, by Satake Shozan 絹本著色松に唐鳥図（佐竹曙山筆／） kenpon chakushoku matsu ni karadori zu (Satake Shozan hitsu) | later C18 | Yokote | private (kept at the Akita Museum of Modern Art) | Akita ranga | | | 39°17′32″N 140°32′51″E | |
| Taizong of Tang, Flowers and Birds, colour on silk, by Odano Naotake 絹本著色唐太宗花鳥図〈小田野直武筆／〉 kenpon chakushoku Tō Taisō kachō zu (Odano Naotake hitsu) | 1770s | Yokote | Akita Prefecture (kept at the Akita Museum of Modern Art) | three scrolls; Akita ranga | | 122.0 centimetres (4 ft 0 in) by 44.5 centimetres (1 ft 5.5 in) | 39°17′32″N 140°32′51″E | |
| Taima Mandala, colour on silk 絹本著色当麻曼荼羅図 kenpon chakushoku Taima mandara zu | Kamakura period | Daisen | Jōren-ji (浄蓮寺) | some flaking of the paint | | | 39°24′24″N 140°28′56″E | |
| Shinobazu Pond, colour on silk, by Odano Naotake 絹本著色不忍池図〈小田野直武筆／〉 kenpon chakushoku Shinobazu-no-ike zu (Odano Naotake hitsu) | 1770s | Yokote | Akita Prefecture (kept at the Akita Museum of Modern Art) | Akita ranga | | 132.5 centimetres (4 ft 4.2 in) by 98.5 centimetres (3 ft 2.8 in) | 39°17′32″N 140°32′51″E | |

== Prefectural Cultural Properties ==
As of 24 May 2019, thirty properties have been designated at a prefectural level.

| Property | Date | Municipality | Ownership | Comments | Image | Dimensions | Coordinates | Ref. |
|---|---|---|---|---|---|---|---|---|
| Child Monju 稚児文珠像 chigo Monju zō | C17 | Nikaho | Kanman-ji (蚶満寺)) | holding a nyoi (scepter); by Kanō Tan'yū | | | 39°12′56″N 139°54′12″E | for all refs see |
| Fugen Bosatsu 普賢菩薩像; Fugen Bosatsu zō | C17 | Daisen | private | by Kanō Tan'yū; thought, alongside his Child Monju at Kanman-ji in Nikaho, to have been part of a group of three paintings - the whereabouts of the central image of Shaka Nyorai is currently unknown | | 120 centimetres (3 ft 11 in) by 75 centimetres (2 ft 6 in) | 39°28′02″N 140°28′14″E | |
| Portrait of Hakuun 白雲上人画像; Hakuun shōnin gazō | | Misato | Hongaku-ji (本覚寺) | | | | 39°25′19″N 140°32′59″E | |
| Sixteen Arhats 十六羅漢像 jūroku rakan zō | Edo period | Akita | Tentoku-ji (天徳寺) | sixteen scrolls | | | 39°44′19″N 140°07′13″E | |
| Customs of Akita, colour on paper, emaki 紙本着色秋田風俗絵巻 shihon chakushoku Akita fuzoku emaki | | Akita | Akita Prefecture (kept at the Akita Prefectural Museum) | | | 14.7 metres (48 ft 3 in) by 38.3 centimetres (1 ft 3.1 in) | 39°49′02″N 140°03′58″E | |
| Senju Kannon, colour on silk 絹本着色千手観音像 kenpon chakushoku Senju Kannon zō | | Nikaho | private | | | | 39°17′35″N 139°57′51″E | |
| Mandala of the Two Realms 金剛胎蔵両界曼荼羅; Kongō-Taizō Ryōkai mandara | end of the Kamakura period | Oga | Chōraku-ji (長楽寺) | two scrolls, colour on silk | | | 39°52′00″N 139°45′06″E | |
| Chinese Peony in a Flower Basket, colour on silk, by Odano Naotake 絹本着色芍薬花籠図 直武筆 kenpon chakushoku shakuyaku hana kago zu Naotake hitsu | 1770s | Yokote | Akita Prefecture (kept at the Akita Museum of Modern Art) | Akita ranga | | 94.5 centimetres (3 ft 1.2 in) by 21.0 centimetres (8.3 in) | 39°17′32″N 140°32′51″E | |
| Kisakata, colour on paper, byōbu 紙本着色象潟図屏風 shihon chakushoku Kisakata zu byōbu | Edo period | Nikaho | Nikaho City (kept at the Nikaho City Kisakata Historical Museum (にかほ市象潟郷土資料館)) | the pair of six-panel folding-screens by Nagamasa Eishō (牧野永昌) (1747-1824) depict Kisakata (象潟) before the great 1804 earthquake that transformed the landscape; Matsuo Bashō visited in 1689 and celebrated Kisakata in Oku no Hosomichi; the area has been designated a Natural Monument | | | 39°12′06″N 139°54′26″E | |
| True Views and Colouring, colour on paper, by Hakuun 紙本着色白雲筆真景帖および彩絵方 shihon chakushoku Hakuun hitsu shinkeijō oyobi saekata | end C18/early C19 | Misato | private (kept at Hongaku-ji (本覚寺)) | | | | 39°25′19″N 140°32′59″E | |
| Amida Raigō, on silk 絹本阿弥陀来迎図 kenpon Amida raigō zu | | Ōdate | private | | | | 40°13′46″N 140°34′47″E | |
| Akita Ranga, Peonies on a Rock 秋田蘭画「岩に牡丹図」 Akita ranga "iwa no botan zu" | Edo period | Daisen | private | by Tashiro Tadakuni (田代忠国) (1757-1830) | | 97 centimetres (3 ft 2 in) by 28.5 centimetres (11.2 in) | 39°27′51″N 140°28′45″E | |
| Hanshan and Shide, ink on paper 紙本墨画寒山拾得 shihon bokuga Kanzan Jittoku | | Akita | Daihi-ji (大悲寺) | pair of scrolls | | | 39°42′46″N 140°06′38″E | |
| Sixteen Benevolent Deities, colour on silk 絹本着色十六善神 kenpon chakushoku jūroku zenjin | | Akita | Daihi-ji (大悲寺) | | | | 39°42′46″N 140°06′38″E | |
| Kōbō Daishi, colour on silk 絹本着色弘法大師像 kenpon chakushoku Kōbō Daishi zō | end of the Kamakura period/early Muromachi period | Oga | Chōraku-ji (長楽寺) | holding a vajra and rosary | | | 39°52′00″N 139°45′06″E | |
| Sketchbook of Odano Naotake 小田野直武筆写生帖; Odano Naotake hitsu shaseichō | c.1777 | Yokote | Akita Prefecture (kept at the Akita Museum of Modern Art) | ink and colour on paper | | 42.5 centimetres (1 ft 4.7 in) by 28.3 centimetres (11.1 in) | 39°17′32″N 140°32′51″E | |
| Cranes, by Shen Nanpin 鶴之図(沈南蘋筆) tsuru no zu (Shen Nanpin hitsu) | 1738 | Yokote | Akita Prefecture (kept at the Akita Museum of Modern Art) | pair of scrolls | | 97.2 centimetres (3 ft 2.3 in) by 49.6 centimetres (1 ft 7.5 in) | 39°17′32″N 140°32′51″E | |
| Shaka Triad 釈迦三尊像図; Shaka sanson zō | | Akita | Tōfuku-ji (当福寺) | | | | 39°43′10″N 140°06′39″E | |
| Copy of Van Royen's Flowers and Birds, colour on paper, by Ishikawa Tairō and Ishikawa Mōkō 紙本着色ファン・ロイエン筆 花鳥図模写 石川大浪・孟高合筆 shihon chakushoku Fan Roien hitsu kachō zu mosha Ishikawa Tairō・Mōkō hitsu | 1796 | Yokote | Akita Prefecture (kept at the Akita Museum of Modern Art) | copy of W. Van Royen's painting of 1725 | | 232.8 centimetres (7 ft 7.7 in) by 107.0 centimetres (3 ft 6.1 in) | 39°17′32″N 140°32′51″E | |
| Nursing Tigress, by Hirafuku Suian 平福穂庵筆 乳虎; Hirafuku Suian hitsu nyūko | 1890 | Yokote | Akita Prefecture (kept at the Akita Museum of Modern Art) | ink and colour on silk | | 159.5 centimetres (5 ft 2.8 in) by 82.4 centimetres (2 ft 8.4 in) | 39°17′32″N 140°32′51″E | |
| High Mountains Clear Autumn, by Terasaki Kōgyō 寺崎廣業筆 高山清秋; Terasaki Kōgyō hitsu kōzan seishū | 1914 | Yokote | Akita Prefecture (kept at the Akita Museum of Modern Art) | on silk, mounted on a pair of six-panel folding screens | | 364.2 centimetres (11 ft 11.4 in) by 168.2 centimetres (5 ft 6.2 in) | 39°17′32″N 140°32′51″E | |
| Haruyama, by Hirafuku Hyakusui 平福百穂筆 春山; Hirafuku Hyakusui hitsu Haruyama | 1933 | Yokote | Akita Prefecture (kept at the Akita Museum of Modern Art) | ink and colour on paper | | 104.0 centimetres (3 ft 4.9 in) by 91.0 centimetres (2 ft 11.8 in) | 39°17′32″N 140°32′51″E | |
| Mount Fuji, by Odano Naotake 小田野直武筆 富嶽図; Odano Naotake hitsu Fugaku zu | 1770s | Yokote | Akita Prefecture (kept at the Akita Museum of Modern Art) | colour on silk | | 77.0 centimetres (2 ft 6.3 in) by 43.5 centimetres (1 ft 5.1 in) | 39°17′32″N 140°32′51″E | |
| Sketchbook of Satake Shozan 佐竹曙山 写生帖; Satake Shozan shaseichō | later C18 | Akita | Akita City (kept at the Akita Senshū Museum of Art) | three volumes | | 34.0 centimetres (13.4 in) by 26.3 centimetres (10.4 in) | 39°43′02″N 140°07′28″E | |
| Scenery with Lake, by Satake Shozan 佐竹曙山筆 湖山風景図; Satake Shozan hitsu gozan fūkei zu | later C18 | Akita | Akita City (kept at the Akita Senshū Museum of Art) | | | 16.0 centimetres (6.3 in) by 26.3 centimetres (10.4 in) | 39°43′02″N 140°07′28″E | |
| Bamboo and Java Sparrows, by Satake Shozan 佐竹曙山筆 竹に文鳥図; Satake Shozan hitsu take ni bunchō zu | later C18 | Akita | Akita City (kept at the Akita Senshū Museum of Art) | | | 136.0 centimetres (53.5 in) by 40.0 centimetres (15.7 in) | 39°43′02″N 140°07′28″E | |
| Irises and a Knife, by Satake Shozan 佐竹曙山筆 燕子花にナイフ図; Satake Shozan hitsu kakitsubata ni naifu zu | later C18 | Akita | Akita City (kept at the Akita Senshū Museum of Art) | | | 112.5 centimetres (44.3 in) by 40.0 centimetres (15.7 in) | 39°43′02″N 140°07′28″E | |
| Pink Lotus, by Satake Shozan 佐竹曙山筆 紅蓮図; Satake Shozan hitsu guren zu | later C18 | Akita | Akita City (kept at the Akita Senshū Museum of Art) | | | 87.0 centimetres (34.3 in) by 30.5 centimetres (12.0 in) | 39°43′02″N 140°07′28″E | |
| Bamboo Grass and White Rabbit, by Odano Naotake 小田野直武筆 笹に白兎図; Odano Naotake hitsu sasa ni shiro usagi zu | later C18 | Akita | Akita City (kept at the Akita Senshū Museum of Art) | | | 100.5 centimetres (39.6 in) by 32.5 centimetres (12.8 in) | 39°43′02″N 140°07′28″E | |
| Children with Dog, by Odano Naotake 小田野直武筆 児童愛犬図; Odano Naotake hitsu jidō aiken zu | later C18 | Akita | Akita City (kept at the Akita Senshū Museum of Art) | | | 41.5 centimetres (16.3 in) by 64.0 centimetres (25.2 in) | 39°43′02″N 140°07′28″E | |

== Municipal Cultural Properties ==
Properties designated at a municipal level include:

| Property | Date | Municipality | Ownership | Comments | Image | Dimensions | Coordinates | Ref. |
|---|---|---|---|---|---|---|---|---|
| Icon with Saints 聖像画; Seizōga | | Ōdate | Hokuroku Orthodox Church (北鹿ハリストス正教会) | by Yamashita Rin | | | 40°12′53″N 140°37′27″E | |
| Ink Landscape, by Satake Yoshimasa 佐竹義和筆「水墨山水」 Satake Yoshimasa hitsu suiboku sansui | Edo period | Akita | Akita City (kept at Satake Historical Museum) | | | | 39°43′12″N 140°07′29″E | |
| Hunter, colour on silk, by Hirafuku Hyakusui 絹本着色猟夫 平福百穂筆 kenpon chakushoku ryōfu Hirafuku Hyakusui hitsu | 1903 | Akita | Akita City (kept at the Akita Senshū Museum of Art) | | | 162.6 centimetres (5 ft 4.0 in) by 92.3 centimetres (3 ft 0.3 in) | 39°43′02″N 140°07′28″E | |
| Begonias with Frog, colour on silk, by Odano Naotake 絹本着色岩に秋海棠と蛙図 小田野直武筆 kenpon chakushoku iwa ni shūkaidō to kaeru zu Odano Naotake hitsu | C18 | Akita | Akita City (kept at the Akita Senshū Museum of Art) | | | 129.0 centimetres (4 ft 2.8 in) by 31.9 centimetres (1 ft 0.6 in) | 39°43′02″N 140°07′28″E | |
| Flowers and Birds, colour on silk, by Sasaki Harazen 絹本着色花鳥図 佐々木原善筆 kenpon chakushoku kachō zu Sasaki Harazen hitsu | Edo period | Akita | Akita City (kept at the Akita Senshū Museum of Art) | | | 143.8 centimetres (4 ft 8.6 in) by 60.8 centimetres (1 ft 11.9 in) | 39°43′02″N 140°07′28″E | |

== See also ==
- Cultural Properties of Japan
- List of National Treasures of Japan (paintings)
- Japanese painting
- List of Historic Sites of Japan (Akita)
- Akita Museum of Art
