= Akita Museum of Modern Art =

- 秋田県立近代美術館
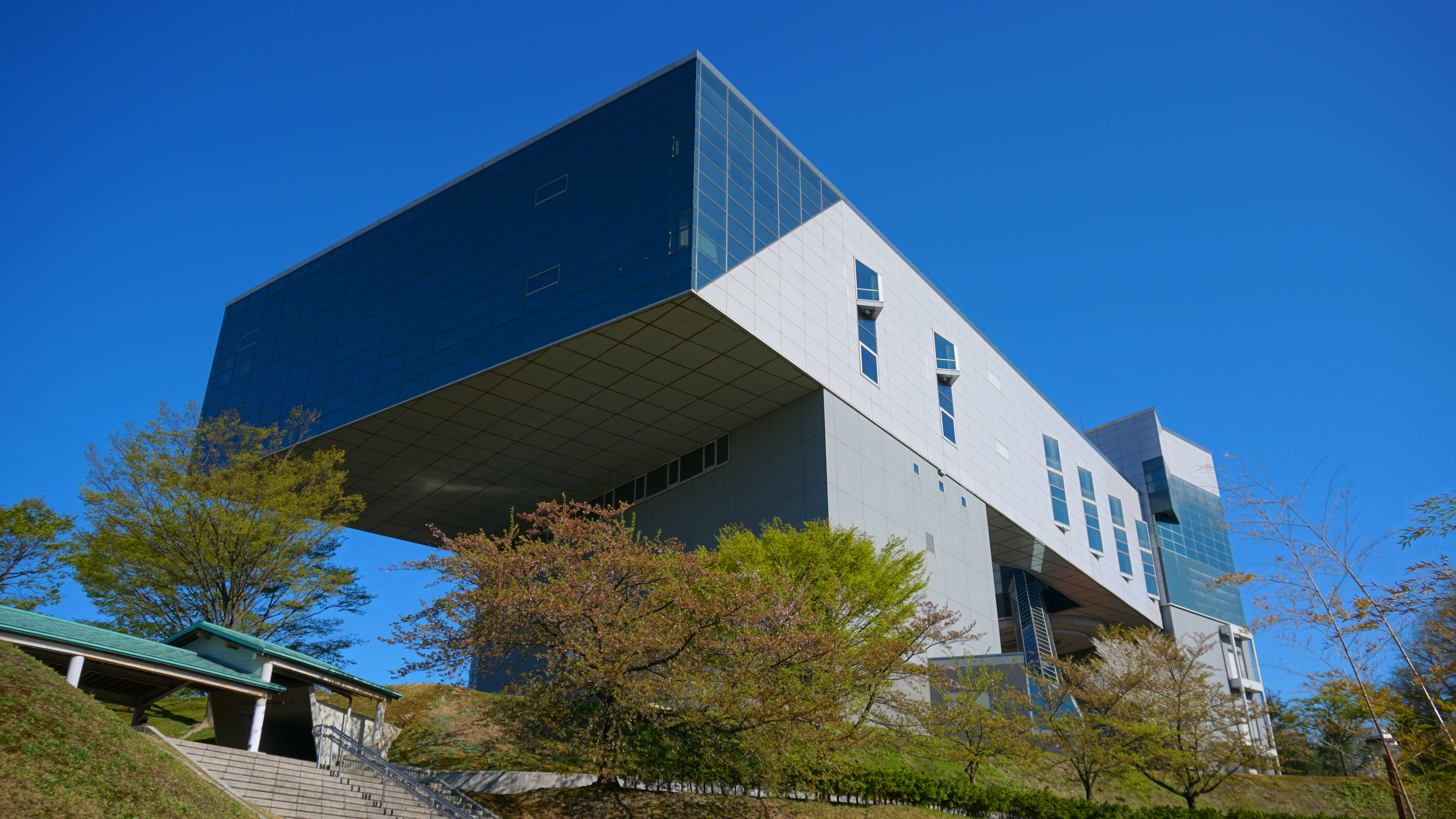

General information
- Location: Tomigasawa-62-46, Akasaka, Yokote, Akita Prefecture, Japan
- Coordinates: 39°17′33″N 140°32′51″E
- Opened: 20 April 1994

Technical details
- Floor count: 8
- Floor area: 11,166.5 m^{2}

Design and construction
- Architect: Yamashita Sekkei
- Architecture firm: https://www.yamashitasekkei.co.jp/en/works/list/momaakita.html

Website
- homepage (ja)

Akita Museum of Modern Art (秋田県立近代美術館, Akita Kenritsu Kindai Bijutsukan) opened in Yokote, Akita Prefecture, Japan in 1994 and houses an important collection of Akita ranga .

== See also ==
- Akita Prefectural Museum
- List of Cultural Properties of Japan - paintings (Akita)
- Yōga (art)
