= Akita Senshū Museum of Art =

- 秋田市立千秋美術館
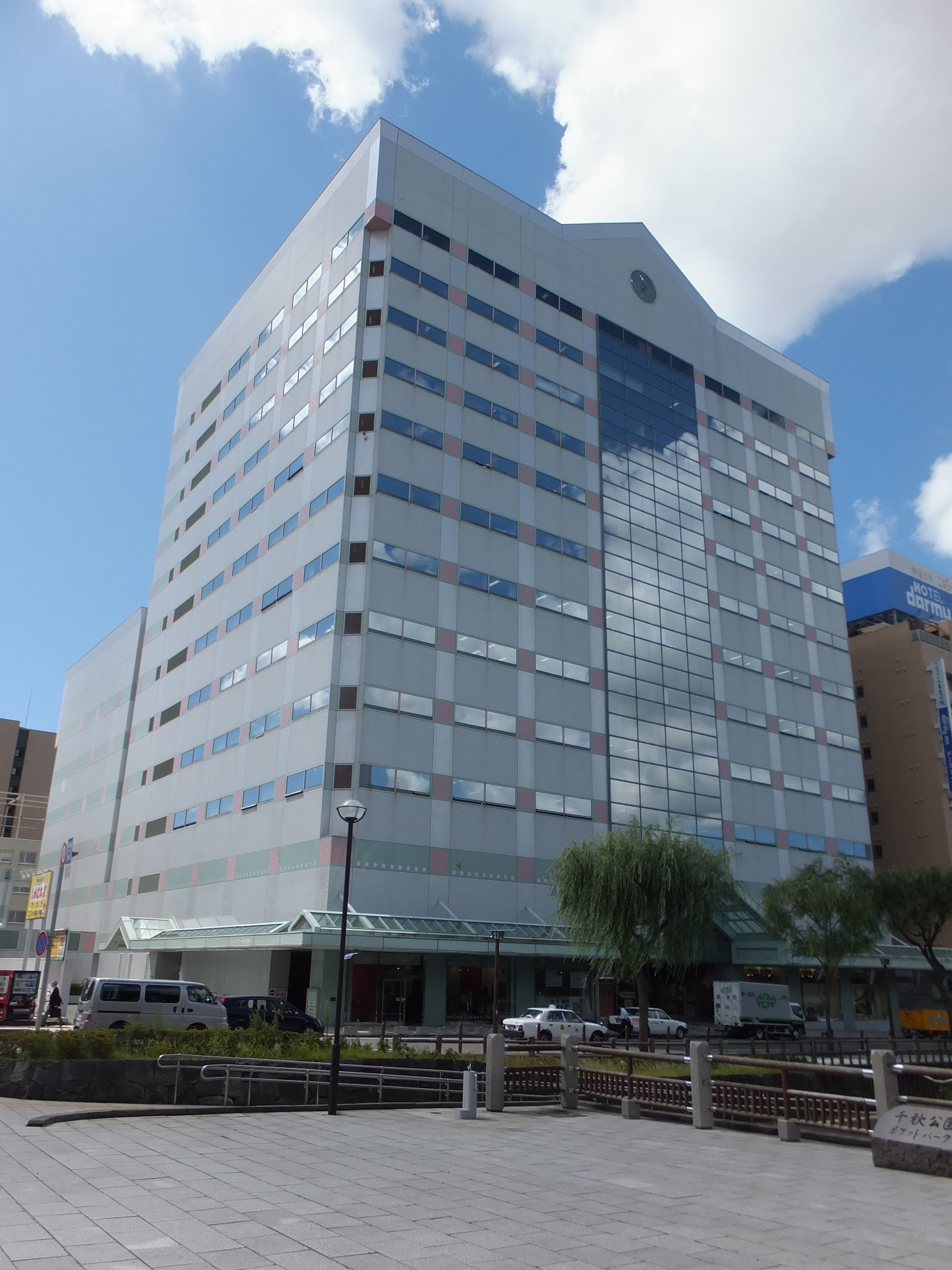

General information
- Location: 3-8 Nakadōri 2-chōme, Akita, Akita Prefecture, Japan
- Coordinates: 39°43′02″N 140°07′29″E
- Opened: 18 November 1989

Website
- Official website

Akita Senshū Museum of Art (秋田市立千秋美術館, Akita Shiritsu Senshū Bijutsukan) opened in Akita, Japan in 1989.

It is located within the Atorion Building (アトリオン), more formally the Akita Integrated Life Cultural Hall・Museum (秋田総合生活文化会館・美術館). The Museum is the successor of the Akita City Museum of Art (秋田市美術館), which opened in 1958. The collection includes many works of the Akita ranga school.

== See also ==
- Akita Museum of Art
- List of Cultural Properties of Japan - paintings (Akita)
