= Satake Historical Museum =

- 秋田市立佐竹史料館
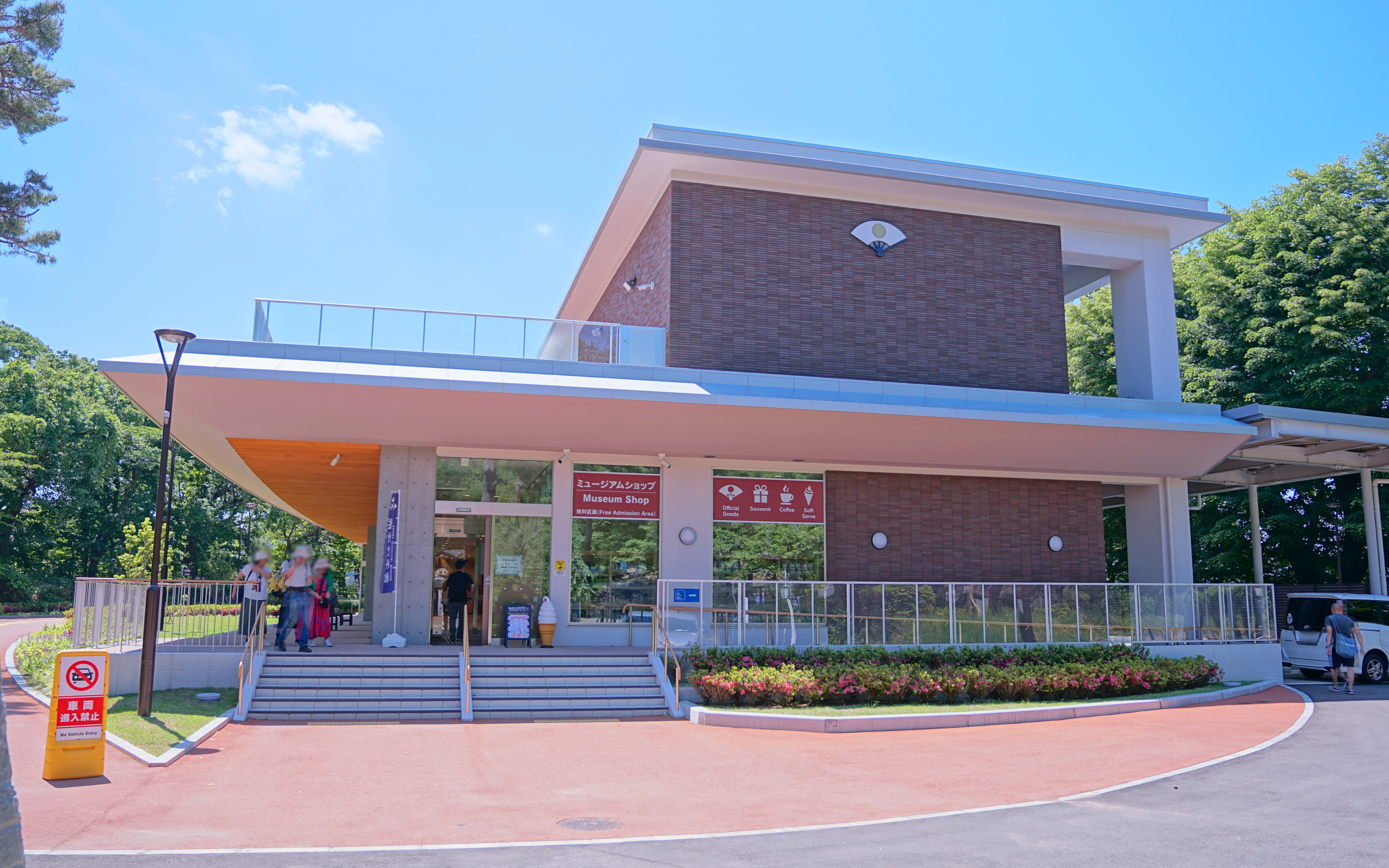

General information
- Location: 1-4 Senshū Kōen, Akita, Akita Prefecture, Japan
- Coordinates: 39°43′12″N 140°07′29″E
- Opened: April 1990

Website
- Official website

Satake Historical Museum (秋田市立佐竹史料館, Akita Shiritsu Satake Shiryōkan) opened in Akita, Akita Prefecture, Japan in 1990. Located in the grounds of Kubota Castle in Senshū Park (千秋公園), the collection relates to the Satake clan, daimyō of the Akita Domain.

Renovated and reopened on October 25 2025.

== See also ==
- Akita Akarenga Folk Museum
- Akita Prefectural Museum
- Akita Senshū Museum of Art
