= Sugisawadai Site =

Archeological site in Noshiro, Akita, Japan

Sugisawadai ruins
- 杉沢台遺跡 (Japanese)
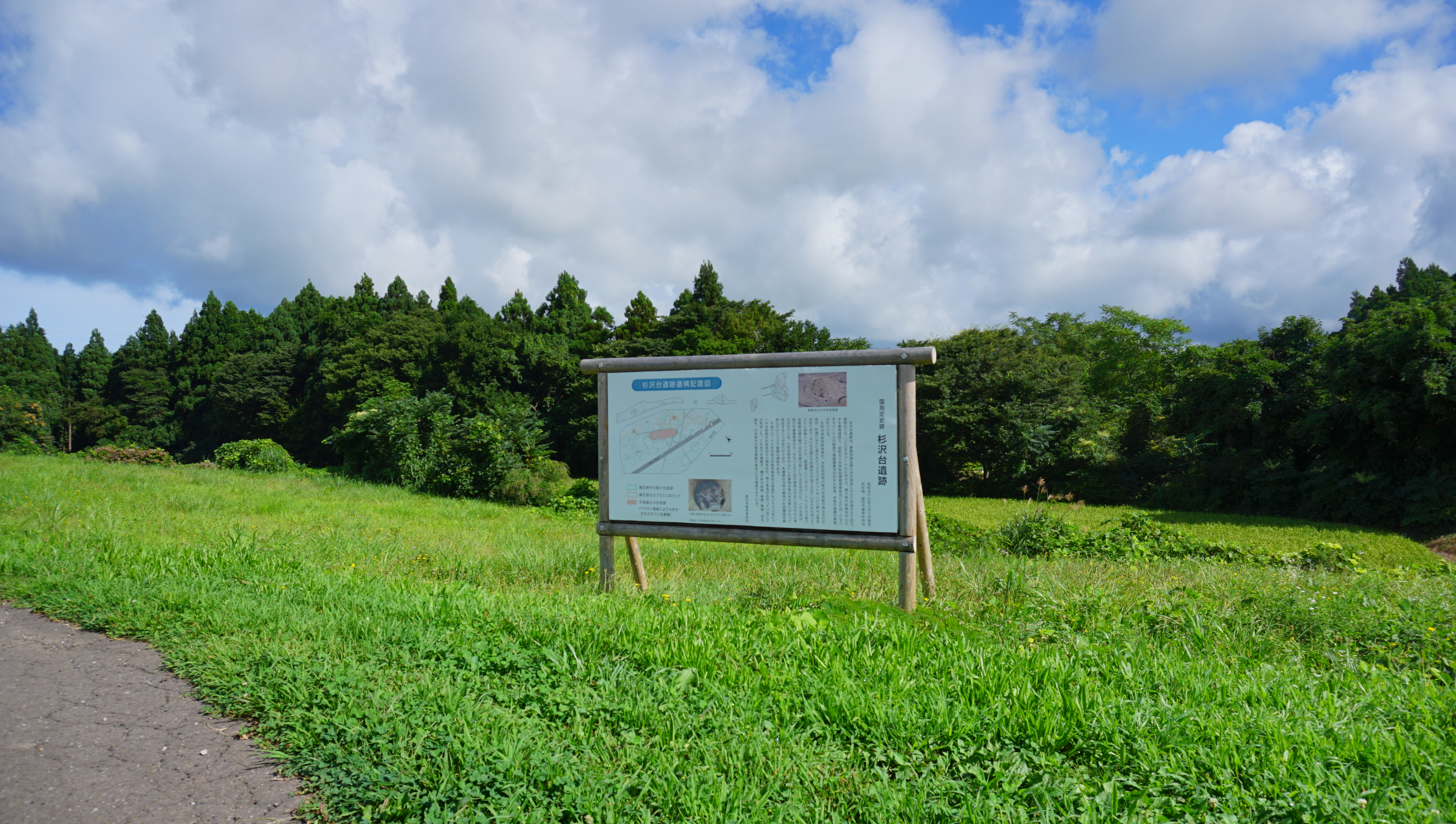
- Sugisawadai ruins

- Sugisawadai ruins Sugisawadai Site (Japan)
- Interactive map of Sugisawadai ruins
- 40°15′07″N 140°03′13″E
- Type: settlement
- Periods: Jōmon period
- Location: Noshiro, Akita, Japan
- Region: Tōhoku region

Site notes
- Elevation: 35 m (115 ft)
- Area: 3,714.79 m^{2} (39,985.7 sq ft)
- Public access: No facilities

The Sugisawadai ruins (杉沢台遺跡, Sugisawadai iseki) is an archaeological site containing the ruins of a large Jōmon period settlement located in the Iwao neighborhood or the city of Noshiro, Akita in the Tōhoku region of Japan. The site was designated a National Historic Site of Japan in 1981.

== Overview ==
The Sugisawadai ruins are located on the north side of the Shinonome Plateau, at an elevation of about 35 meters in the lower Yonedai River area, near the Sea of Japan. It is a large village site centering on the first half of the Jōmon period and extends over an area of 35,000 square meters. As a result of excavation surveys by the Akita Prefectural Board of Education and the Noshiro City Board of Education since 1980, a number of remains were confirmed. These included the foundations of 44 pit dwellings, including 4 large oval longhouse-style dwellings. One of these structures had a length of 31 meters, and is thought to have served for some ceremonial purpose. The site also has 109 flask-shaped storage pits for food storage. Many of the flask-shaped storage holes were two meters deep, and some contained the remnants of discarded shells. Of note was a polished stone axe from the early Jōmon period which was made of a type of stone found only in the Hidaka region of Hokkaidō. Some stone fragments of the same type of rock were also found in the vicinity, leading to the speculation that the stone ax was made locally from raw materials obtained by trade with Hokkaidō.

Other artifacts recovered included a stone sarcophagus and stone weights which were used with fishing nets, as well as numerous examples of Jōmon pottery, including cylindrical pots with evidence that they were used for cooking.

During the Heian period, a portion of the site was occupied by a later village, and the traces of five pit dwellings from that period have been confirmed. There is another extensive ruin from the Yayoi period, the Sugisawano ruins, located a short distance to the south, which are not part of the National Historic Site designation.

Sugisawadai Site is located approximately a 30-minute walk from Kita-Noshiro Station on the JR East Gonō Line.

== See also ==
- List of Historic Sites of Japan (Akita)
