= Akita Akarenga Museum =

- 秋田市立赤れんが郷土館
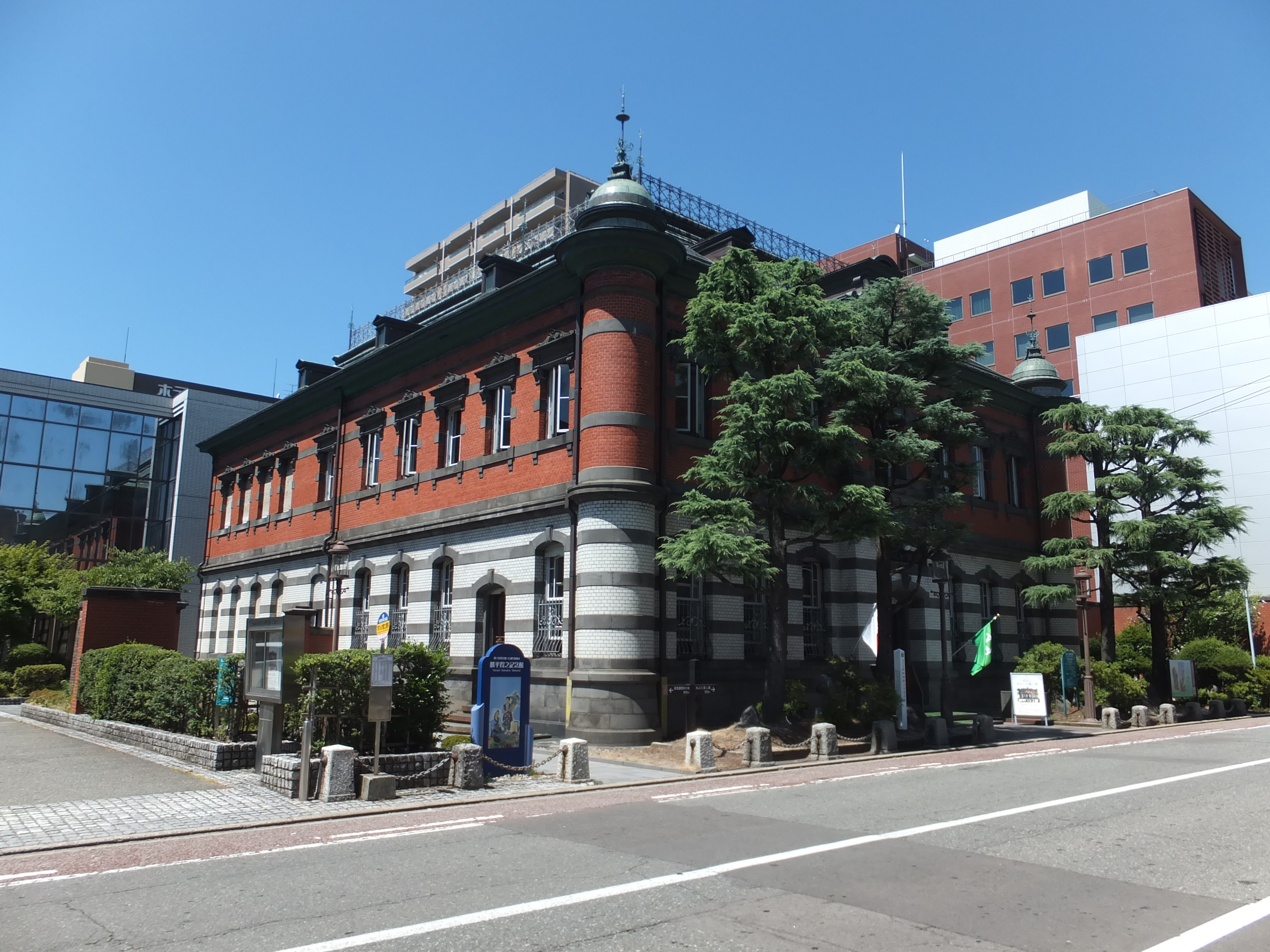
- Established: 1985; 41 years ago
- Location: 3-chōme 3-21 Ōmachi, Akita, Akita Prefecture, Japan
- Coordinates: 39°43′00″N 140°06′57″E
- Type: Folk museum

The Akita Akarenga Museum (秋田市立赤れんが郷土館, Akita shiritsu akarenga kyōdokan) is a museum of local history and culture in Akita, Japan.

== Summary ==
The red brick (赤煉瓦, akarenga) building housing the museum was designed by the architect Yamaguchi Naoaki, a student of Vincenzo Ragusa. Construction began in 1909 and completed in 1912.

The building long served as the head office of the Akita Bank and is today designated an Important Cultural Property.

In 1981, the building was donated to the municipality of Akita. Recognizing its significance as a surviving example of Meiji period architecture, the municipality renovated it before opening it to the public as the Akita Akarenga Museum in 1985. The museum maintains permanent exhibits dedicated to the printmaker Katsuhira Tokushi (1904–1971) and the coppersmith Sekiya Shirō (1907–1994).

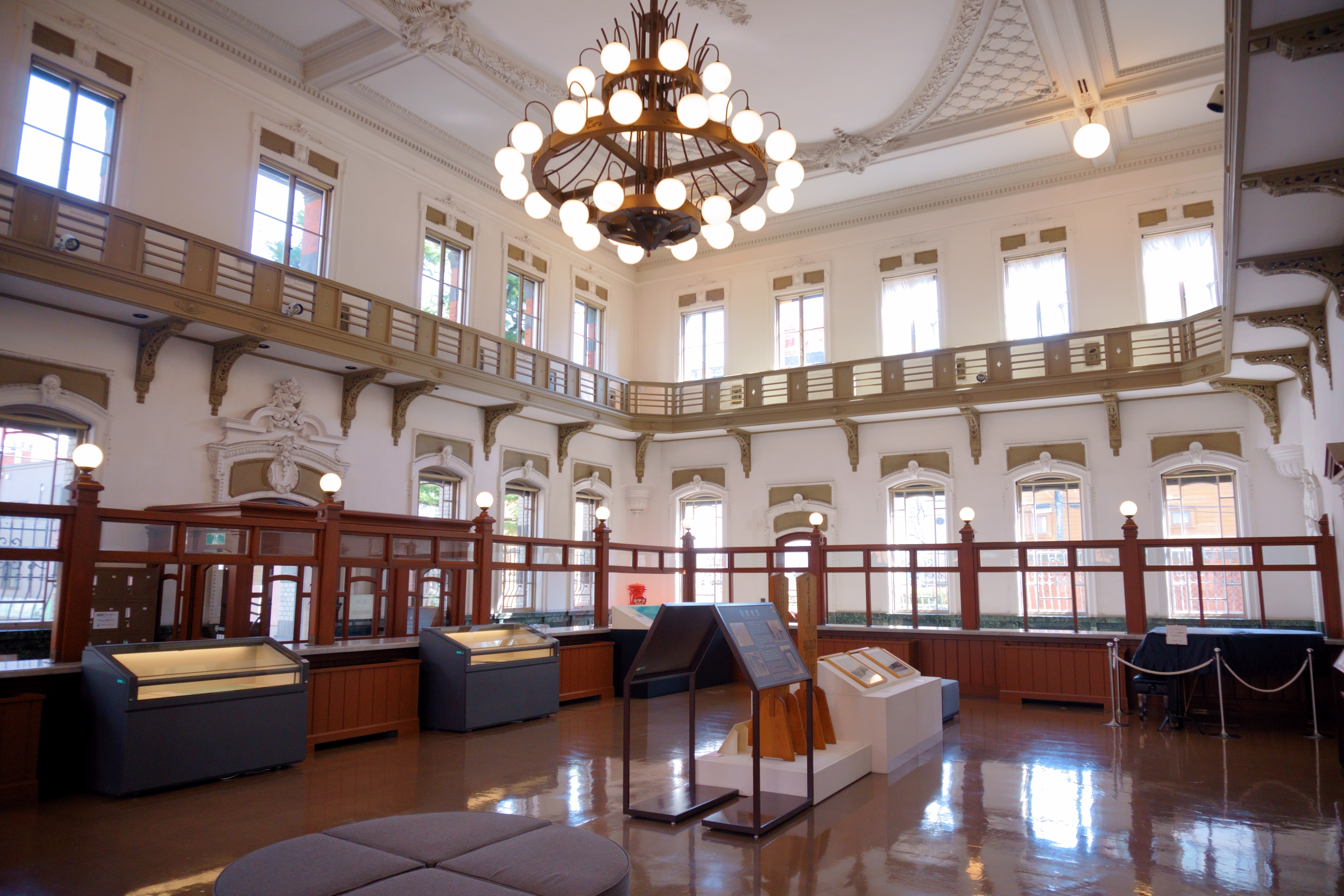
Interior

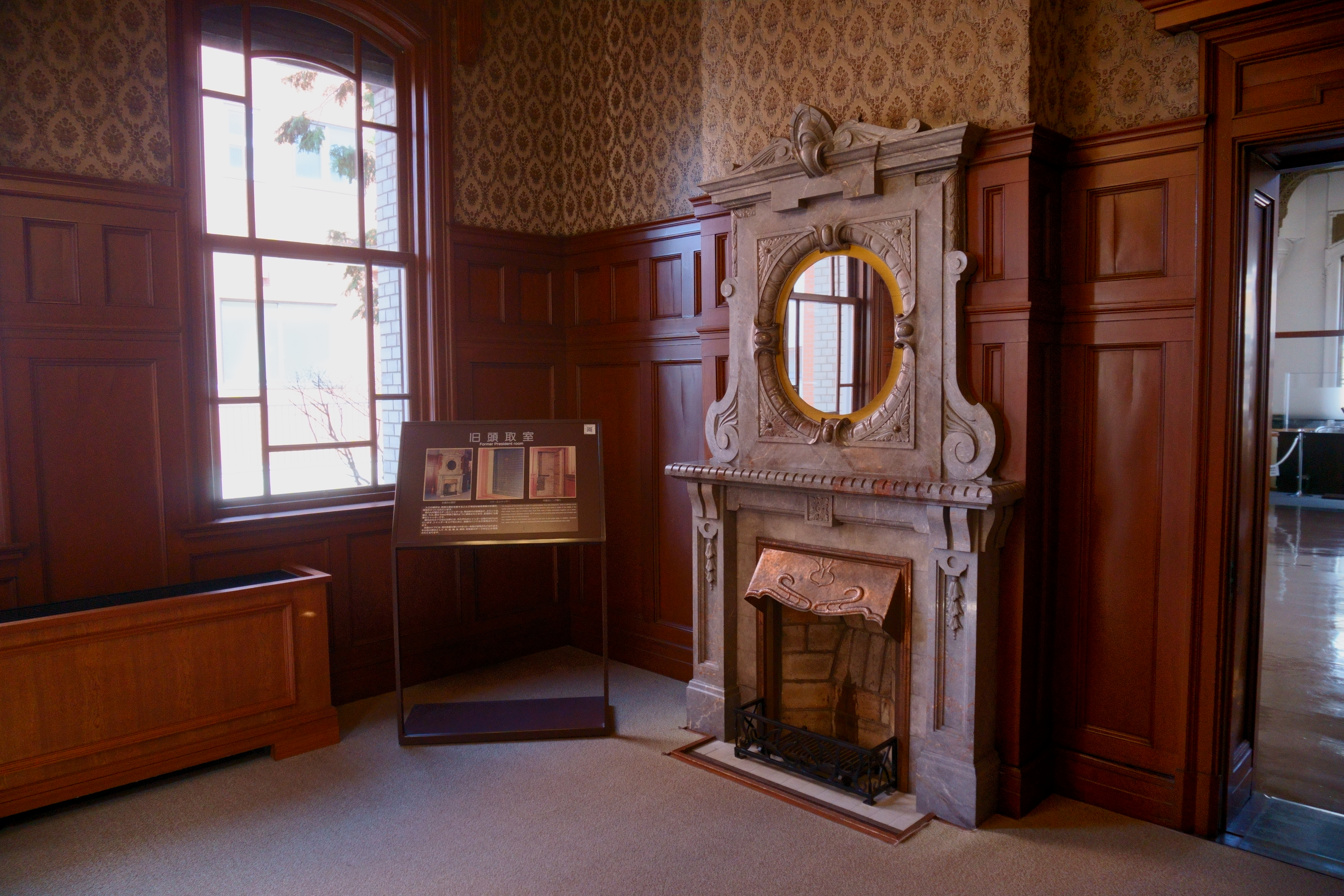
Ibid.

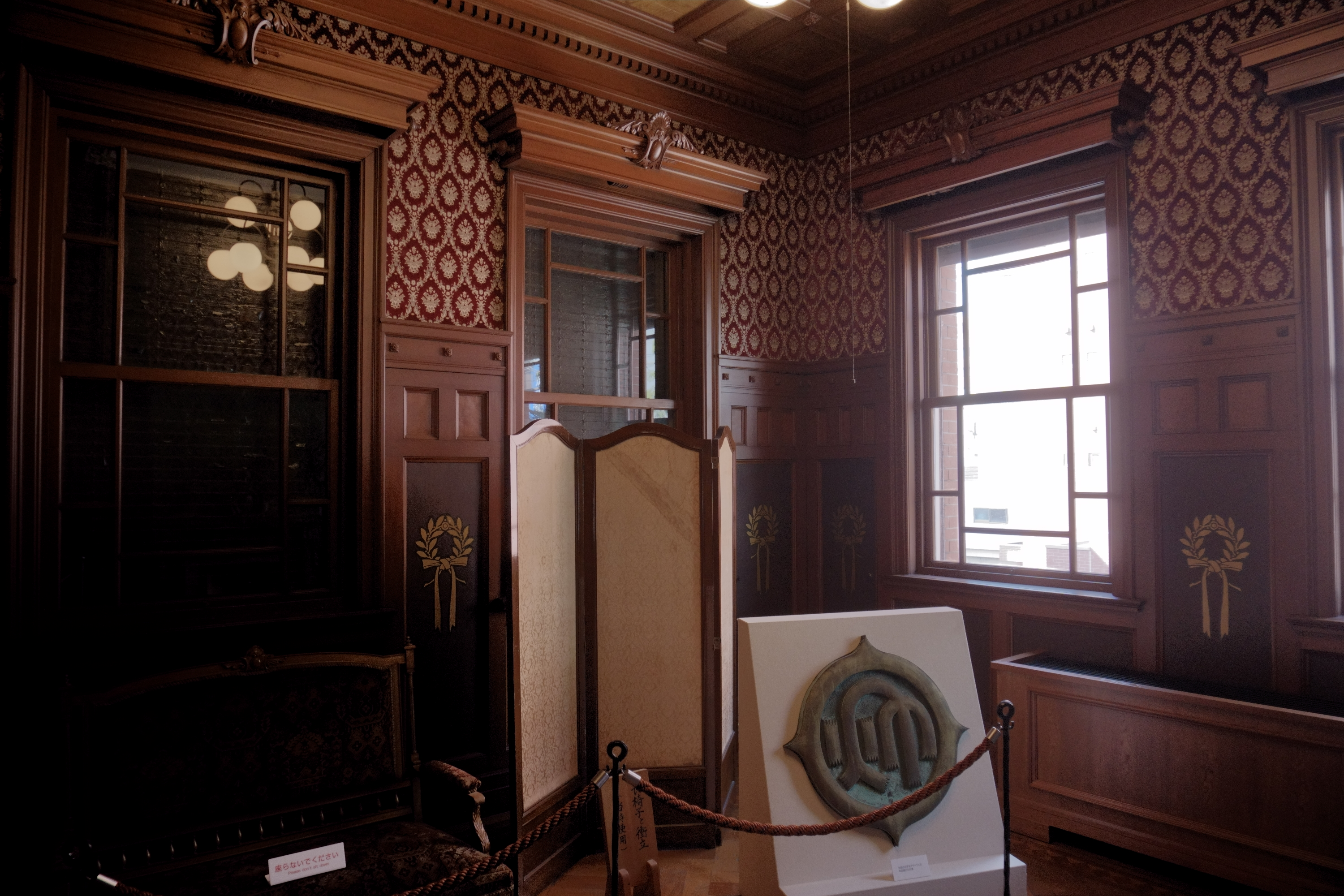
Ibid.

== See also ==
- Satake Historical Museum
