= Iwaidō Caves =

Archaeological site in Japan

- 岩井堂洞窟 (Japanese)
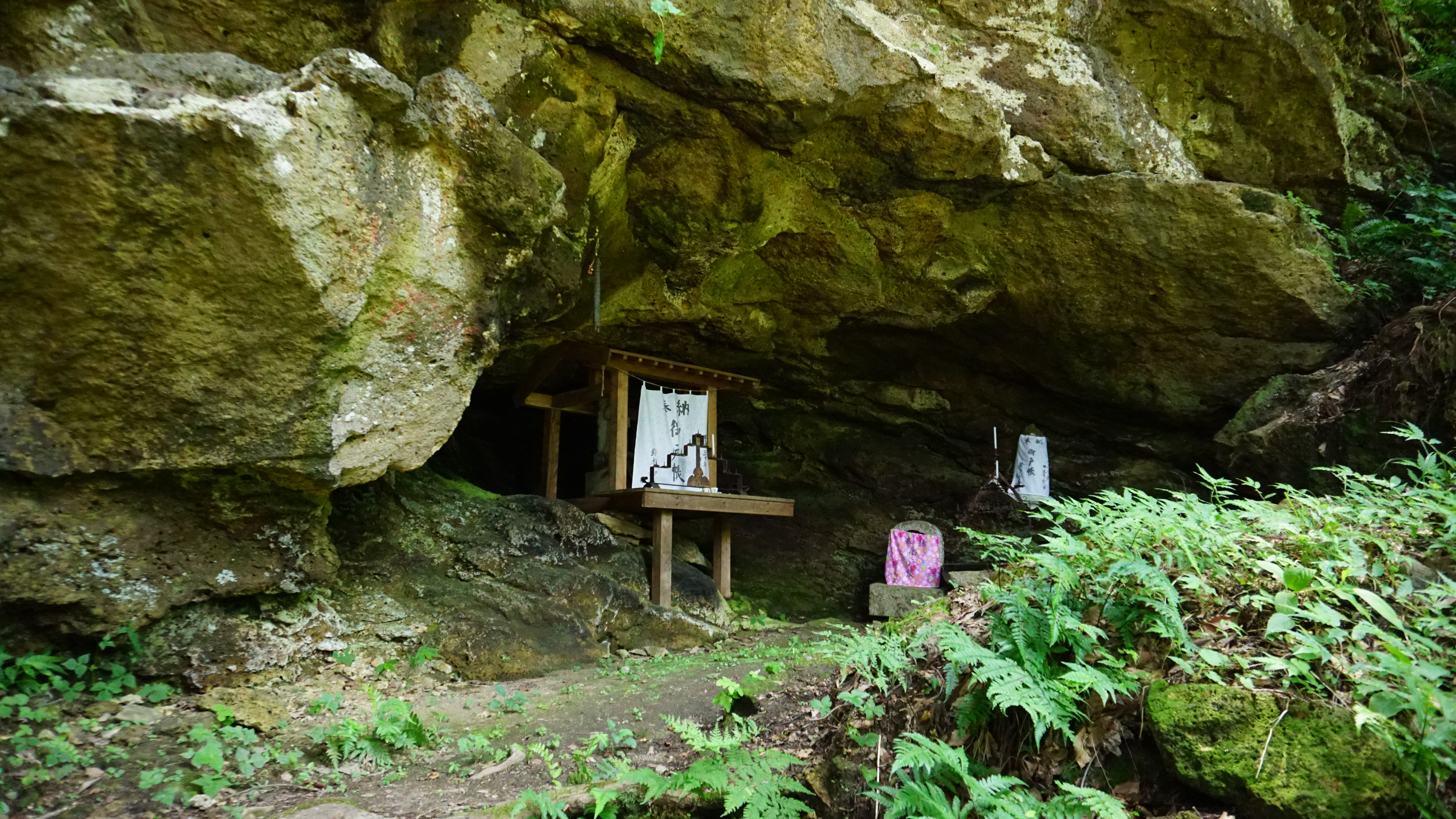
- Iwaidō Caves

- Iwaidō Caves Iwaidō Caves (Japan)
- 39°02′51″N 140°24′09″E
- Type: settlement
- Periods: Jōmon period
- Location: Yuzawa, Akita, Japan
- Region: Tōhoku region

Site notes
- Elevation: 190 m (620 ft)
- Area: 4,342.96 m^{2} (46,747.2 sq ft)
- Excavation dates: 1962-1970, 1976
- Discovered: 1900
- Public access: Yes (Museum on site)

The Iwaidō Caves (岩井堂洞窟, Iwaidō dōkutsu) is an archaeological site containing the ruins of a Jōmon period cave dwelling located in what is now part of the city of Yuzawa, Akita in the Tōhoku region of Japan. The site was designated a National Historic Site of Japan in 1978.

== Overview ==
The Iwaidō Cave is located on the right bank of the Ogatsu River, which joins the uppermost stream of the Omono River, in swamps deep into the mountains near the border between Akita Prefecture and Yamagata Prefecture, at an altitude of 190 meters. The ruins are composed of four large and small caves in a tuff outcrop with a total length of about 80 meters, and a height of two to eight meters The caves were used as dwellings in the Jōmon period, and a relic inclusion layer was found in each cave.

The caves were explored by local archaeologists around the year 1900, and a number of earthenware and stone artifacts were recovered from Cave 2. However, it was not until 1962 to 1970, and in 1976 that a series of comprehensive excavations were undertaken by the Akita Prefecture Board of Education.

Cave 1 was occupied by a Shinto shrine and contained only a small amount of late Jōmon period earthenware. Because the cave and vestibule are small, it was deemed that the cave was only irregularly used.

Cave 2 was found to have seven layers of relic deposits to a depth of about 1.2 meters. The lowest layer contained a group of pointed earthenware from the early Jōmon period, and each of the subsequent layers had artifacts of late middle and late Jōmon pottery, final-Jōmon pottery, and finally Haji ware and Yayoi period earthenware in a stratified manner.

Cave 3 was shallow, but had a thick deposit level in its vestibule, and excavations were conducted to a depth of about three meters. The uppermost layers contained Yayoi period artifacts, but several intermediate layers were barren. It is estimated that the lowest layer may contain Jōmon or pre-Jōmon artifacts.

Cave 4 is the largest and best preserved of the sites, and contained the largest amount of relics. The depth of the cave is shallow, but the front is about four meters long, and the vestibule had a flat surface with a length of around 20 metes. A total of 14 layers from topsoil to bedrock were confirmed, and with a depth of eight meters. Artifacts were found in the 1st, 3rd, 5th, 7th, 9th, 11th and 13th layers. The first layer contained earthenware, Yayoi pottery, late Jōmon period pottery, the third layer contained late Jōmon period pottery, the fifth layer contained early Jōmon period artifacts, and the seventh and lower layers belong to the early Jōmon period. The style of earthenware excavated from the 11th and 13th layers was almost unknown in the Tōhoku region at the time of the survey, and was an extremely important archaeological discovery. Many stone tools have also been excavated, including a sarcophagus, polished stone axes, and other items. In the 7th layer, burnt earth, considered to be furnace remains, was discovered.

From the above, it was determined that the site has been used as a residence for several thousand years, except for and unexplained gap in the middle of the Jōmon period.

The caves are not open to the public, but there is a small museum housing some of the discovered items and a diorama. It is located approximately 25 minutes on foot from JR East Ōu Main Line Innai Station.

== See also ==
- List of Historic Sites of Japan (Akita)
- Matagi
