= Yuri Coast Seawall =

- 由利海岸波除石垣 (Japanese)
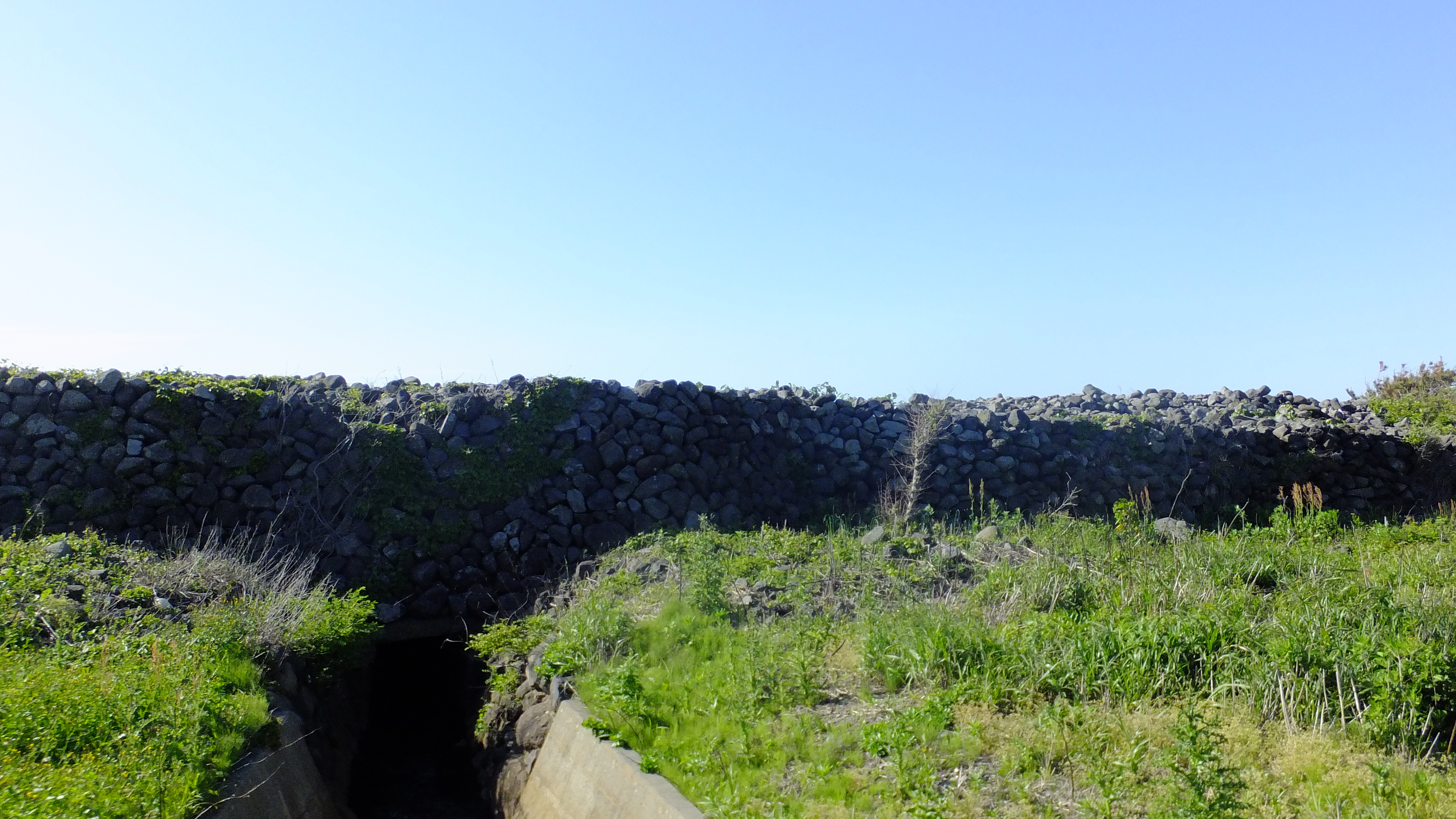
- Yuri Coast Seawall

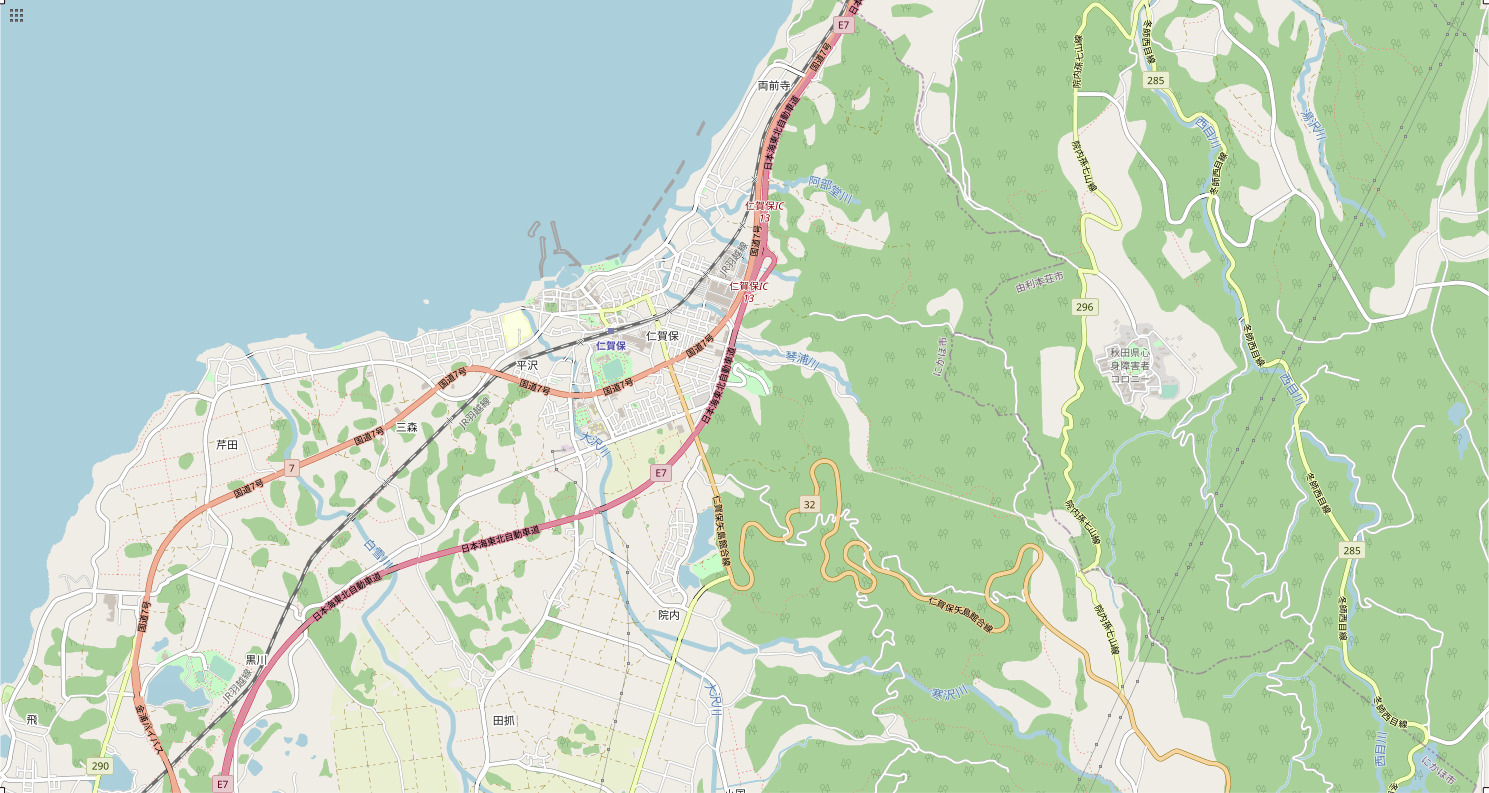
- Yuri Coast Seawall Yuri Coast Seawall (Akita Prefecture) Yuri Coast Seawall (Japan)
- 39°16′51″N 139°55′18″E
- Periods: Edo period
- Location: Nikaho, Akita, Japan
- Region: Tohoku region

The Yuri Coast Seawall (由利海岸波除石垣, Yuri kaigan namiyoke ishigaki) is an Edo period (1600-1868) seawall against high waves, salt spray, and strong winds on the Sea of Japan coast in what is now part of the city of Nikaho, Akita. Its remains were designated a National Historic Site of Japan in 1997.

== Overview ==
Under the Edo period Tokugawa shogunate, the coastal area of Dewa Province in what is now the city of Nikaho was part of the 20,000 koku holdings of Honjō Domain. The actual date of construction of a seawall in this location is not certain, but it is believed to be sometime in the 18th century. The wall is built of natural stones, with the large stones having a diameter of around 30 to 50 centimeters, and the spaces in between filled with crushed stones and gravel. The method is consistent with the construction method for Japanese castle walls during the 18th century (it may even have been constructed earlier) and there is evidence of a request for renovation in 1782.

The height of the wall was from 1.2 to 3 meters (3 ft 11 in to 9 ft 10 in), and it incorporated a number of water gates. The structure is no longer continuous due to damage from storms, earthquakes and pilferage; four sections with a total length of 370 metres (1,210 ft) remain. The seawall is approximately 10 minutes by car from Nikaho Station on the JR East Uetsu Main Line.

== See also ==
- List of Historic Sites of Japan (Akita)
