= Ōtoriiyama ruins =

Archaeological site of the Heian period

Ōtoriiyama ruins 大鳥井山遺跡
- Yokote, Akita Prefecture, Japan
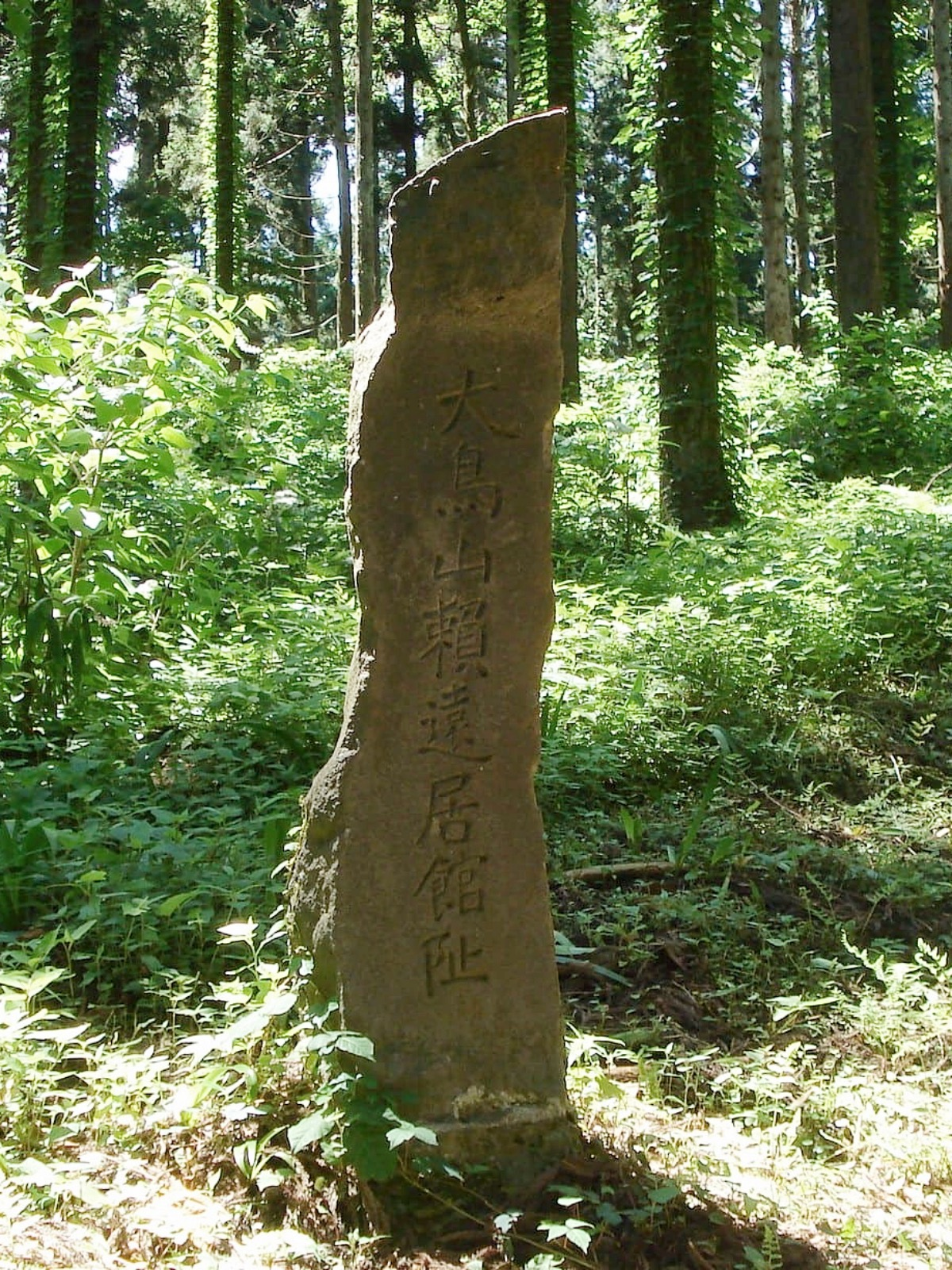
- Ōtoriiyama ruins

Site information
- Type: yamashiro-style Japanese castle
- Open to the public: Yes, but backfilled
- Condition: ruins

Location
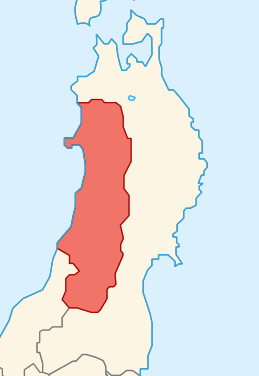
- Location within Akita Prefecture Location within Dewa, Japan Location within Japan
- Coordinates: 39°19′43.59″N 140°33′50.11″E

Site history
- In use: Heian period

The Ōtoriiyama ruins (大鳥井山遺跡, Ōtoriiyama iseki) is an archaeological site containing a large Heian period jōsaku-style fortification located in what is now part of the city of Yokote, Akita in the Tōhoku region of Japan. The site was designated a National Historic Site of Japan in 2010.

== Overview ==
The Ōtoriiyama ruins are located approximately two kilometers northeast of Yokote City Hall, on the east side of the confluence of the Yokote River and its tributary, the Yoshizawa River. The relative height from the river surface is about 20 meters. The site was discovered when Yokote City planned the development of a general sports park in the area, and excavations were conducted over seven years from 1977 to 1983.

The ruins consist of the traces of a castle with a huge double moat and an earthen rampart, which was constructed from the second half of the 10th century to the second half of the 11th century. The ruins extend for 680 meters north to south by 200 meters east to west, with earthen walls and moats in the three directions that do not face the river. The earthen wall is 10 meters wide, 2 meters high, and the wet moat is 8 meters wide and about 3.5 meters deep. The dry moat is 10 meters wide and 3 meters deep. Within the moats and earthen ramparts was a wooden fence line, and along the fence were the foundations of a building which probably functioned as a guardhouse. The site of the bridge across the moats, and the foundations of a number of pit dwellings were also identified. The size of the castle and the strength of its fortifications were exceptional for the period, and are more typical of a Sengoku period fortification. In the center of the fortification was the foundation of a large building with pillared construction. Artifacts associated with the Kiyowara clan were found in this area, including a small earthenware bowl which may have been used at banquets.

According to the Mutsu Waki, a chronicle of the Former Nine Years' War, Ōtoriiyama Tarō Yorien was the son of Kiyohara Mitsunori, and his fortification was a stronghold of the Kiyohara clan in Dewa Province. The outline of the castle is similar to the later Yanagi-no-Gosho fortification in Hiraizumi and may have served as the inspiration for its design.

At present, the ruins have been backfilled, and the sports complex has been developed as originally planned, with the remainder of the site becoming residential land. Part of the site is occupied by the Shinto shrine, the Ōtoriiyama Jinja, which was built in 1679–1680.

== See also ==
- List of Historic Sites of Japan (Akita)
