= List of historic sites of Japan (Akita) =

This list is of the historic sites of Japan located within the Prefecture of Akita.

== National Historic Sites ==
As of 3 January 2026, fourteen Sites have been designated as being of national significance (including one *Special Historic Site); Mount Chōkai spans the prefectural borders with Yamagata.

Site	Municipality	Comments	Image	Coordinates	Type	Ref.
*Ōyu Stone Circles 大湯環状列石 Ōyu kanjōresseki	Kazuno	submitted for inscription on the UNESCO World Heritage List as one of the Jōmon Archaeological Sites in Hokkaidō, Northern Tōhoku, and other regions	Ōyu Stone Circle	40°16′17″N 140°48′16″E	1	268
Isedōtai Ruins 伊勢堂岱遺跡 Isedōtai iseki	Kita-Akita	submitted for inscription on the UNESCO World Heritage List as one of the Jōmon Archaeological Sites in Hokkaidō, Northern Tōhoku, and other regions	Isedōtai ruins	40°12′05″N 140°20′54″E	1	3277
Iwaidō Caves 岩井堂洞窟 Iwaidō dōkutsu	Yuzawa	Jōmon period cave dwelling	Iwaidō Caves	39°02′51″N 140°24′09″E	1	272
Akita Castle ruins 秋田城跡 Akita-jō ato	Akita	early Heian period fortified settlement	Akita Castle ruins	39°44′25″N 140°04′53″E	2	267
Sugisawadai ruins 杉沢台遺跡 Sugisawadai iseki	Noshiro	Jōmon period settlement	Sugisawadai ruins	40°15′07″N 140°03′13″E	1	274
Ōtoriiyama ruins 大鳥井山遺跡 Ōtoriiyama iseki	Yokote	Heian period fortification ruins	Ōtoriiyama ruins	39°19′44″N 140°33′50″E	2	00003656
Jizōden ruins 地蔵田遺跡 Jizōden iseki	Akita	Yayoi period settlement	Jizōden ruins	39°39′28″N 140°09′26″E	1	276
Hotta-no-saku ruins 払田柵跡 Hotta-no-saku ato	Daisen, Misato	early Heian fortified city; growth rings have been dated to 801	Hotta-no-saku ruins	39°28′07″N 140°32′50″E	2	260
Hirata Atsutane grave 平田篤胤墓 Hirata Atsutane no haka	Akita	Edo period scholar	Hirata Atsutane grave	39°43′43″N 140°08′14″E	7	264
Yuri Coast Seawall 由利海岸波除石垣 Yuri kaigan namiyoke ishigaki	Nikaho	Edo-period barrier	Yuri Coast Seawall	39°16′51″N 139°55′18″E	6	277
Wakimoto Castle ruins 脇本城跡 Wakimoto-jō ato	Oga	Sengoku-period castle	Wakimoto Castle ruins	39°54′09″N 139°53′21″E	2	3399
Hiyama Andō Clan Fortified Residence ruins 檜山安東氏城館跡 Hiyama Andō-shi jōkan ato	Noshiro	designation includes the sites of Hiyama Castle (檜山城跡), the great hall (大館跡), and Chausu hall (茶臼館跡)	Hiyama Andō Clan Fortified Residence ruins	40°09′58″N 140°07′24″E	2	273
Mount Chōkai 鳥海山 Chōkaisan	Yurihonjō, Nikaho	designation includes an area of Yuza in Yamagata Prefecture	Mount Chōkai	39°05′42″N 140°02′41″E	3	00003566
Dewa Kanezawa Castle Site 出羽金沢城跡; Dewa Kanezawa-jō ato	Yokote			39°22′17″N 140°34′39″E		

== Prefectural Historic Sites ==
As of 1 May 2025, forty-four Sites have been designated as being of prefectural importance.

Site	Municipality	Comments	Image	Coordinates	Type	Ref.
Joshitei 如斯亭; Joshitei	Akita	also a Place of Scenic Beauty		39°44′03″N 140°07′45″E		for all refs see
Yaishi Fortified Residence Site 矢石館遺跡; Yaishi tate iseki	Ōdate			40°17′42″N 140°25′19″E		
Ancient Kilns 上代窯跡 jōdai yōseki	Akita			39°48′09″N 140°06′42″E		
Shiroiwa-yaki Kiln Site 白岩焼窯跡; Shiroiwa-yaki kama ato	Semboku			39°35′01″N 140°37′07″E		
Jūsanbonzuka 十三本塚; Jūsanbonzuka	Ugo			39°11′49″N 140°26′20″E		
Tentoku-ji 万固山天徳寺; Bankosan Tentokuji	Akita			39°44′19″N 140°07′12″E		
Kashikodokoro Shell Mound 柏子所貝塚; Kashikodokoro kaizuka	Noshiro			40°10′18″N 140°02′47″E		
Former Misakiyama Kaidō 三崎山旧街道; Misakiyama kyū-kaidō	Nikaho			39°07′10″N 139°52′29″E		
Iizume Pit Group 飯詰竪穴群; Iizume tateana-gun	Misato			39°21′55″N 140°33′00″E		
Shijūni Fortified Residence Site 四十二館跡; Shijūni tate ato	Daisen			39°25′02″N 140°29′16″E		
Yatate Haiji Site 矢立廃寺跡; Yatate Haiji ato	Ōdate			40°21′37″N 140°35′23″E		
Cliff 磨崖; Magai	Yuzawa			39°03′07″N 140°27′13″E		
Ichirizuka 一里塚; Ichirizuka	Daisen			39°31′20″N 140°22′39″E		
Uchidate Bunko Site 内館文庫跡（建物・蔵書及び塾用器物を含む） Uchidate Bunko ato (tatemono・zōsho oyobi juku-yō kibutsu o fukumu)	Kitaakita			40°15′14″N 140°22′07″E		
Shinzōshidō Kiln Site 心像市道の窯跡; Shinzōshidō no kama ato	Daisen			39°34′16″N 140°28′04″E		
Ichirizuka 一里塚; Ichirizuka	Yuzawa			39°09′10″N 140°29′31″E		
Iwanoyama Kofun Cluster 岩野山古墳群; Iwanoyama kofun-gun	Gojōme			39°56′03″N 140°07′16″E		
Suzume Fortified Residence Old Well 雀館古代井戸; Suzume date kodai ido	Gojōme			39°56′24″N 140°07′21″E		
Ishikawa Rikinosuke Site 石川理紀之助遺跡; Ishikawa Rikinosuke iseki	Katagami			39°52′27″N 140°05′05″E		
Hiyama Fork Ushū Kaidō Pine Avenue 檜山追分旧羽州街道松並木; Hiyama oiwake kyū-Ushū kaidō matsu namiki	Noshiro			40°10′40″N 140°06′14″E		
Former Aoyagi Family Samurai Residence 旧青柳家武家屋敷 kyū-Aoyagi-ke buke yashiki	Semboku			39°36′02″N 140°33′43″E		
Former Innai Ginzan Site 旧院内銀山跡 kyū-Innai ginzan ato	Yuzawa			39°02′56″N 140°21′49″E		
Iwahashi Family Samurai Residence 岩橋家武家屋敷; Iwahashi-ke buke yashiki	Semboku			39°35′54″N 140°33′44″E		
Kayakarisawa Shell Mound Site 萱刈沢貝塚遺跡; Kayakarisawa kaizuka iseki	Mitane			40°06′47″N 140°00′29″E		
Hondō Castle Site 本堂城跡; Hondō-jō ato	Misato			39°28′38″N 140°33′49″E		
Ichijōgi Site 一丈木遺跡; Ichijōgi iseki	Misato			39°28′07″N 140°36′24″E		
Yudeno Site 湯出野遺跡; Yudeno iseki	Yurihonjō			39°17′41″N 140°17′13″E		
Yoshida Castle Site 吉田城跡; Yoshida-jō ato	Yokote			39°17′26″N 140°30′26″E		
Amaterasu Sumemioya Jinja Precinct Rock Buddhas and Stelai 天照皇御祖神社境内の磨崖仏及び板碑; Amaterasu Sumemioya Jinja keidai no magaibutsu oyobi itabi	Kazuno			40°06′38″N 140°47′25″E		
Kameda Domain Iwaki Clan Graves 亀田藩主岩城家墓所; Kameda-han-shu Iwaki-ke bosho	Yurihonjō	at Ryūmon-ji (龍門寺)		39°30′14″N 140°04′53″E		
Yamane Fortified Residence Site 山根館跡; Yamane tate ato	Nikaho			39°15′54″N 139°58′59″E		
Tozawa Family Fortified Residence Sites 戸沢氏城館跡（門屋城跡・古堀田城跡） Tozawa-shi jōkan ato (Kadoya-jō ato・Kohotta-jō ato)	Semboku	designation includes the sites of Kadoya Castle (門屋城跡) and Kohotta Castle (古堀田城跡)		39°40′03″N 140°33′04″E		
Ōtsutsumi Ichirizuka 大堤一里塚; Ōtsutsumi ichirizuka	Kitaakita			40°15′19″N 140°22′50″E		
Kamosu Ichirizuka 鴨巣一里塚; Kamosu ichirizuka	Noshiro			40°11′43″N 140°07′00″E		
Nishimonai Castle Site 西馬音内城跡; Nishimonai-jō ato	Ugo			39°11′19″N 140°22′32″E		
Toshima Fortified Residence Site 豊島館跡; Toshima tate ato	Akita			39°39′01″N 140°11′23″E		
Ōhata Kiln Site 大畑古窯跡; Ōhata koyō ato	Daisen			39°27′40″N 140°22′39″E		
Yokoyama Site 横山遺跡; Yokoyama iseki	Yurihonjō			39°24′13″N 140°04′20″E		
Andō Shōeki Grave 安藤昌益墓; Andō Shōeki haka	Ōdate	in the precinct of Onsen-ji (温泉寺)		40°14′27″N 140°33′10″E		
Sugae Masumi Grave 菅江真澄墓; Sugae Masumi haka	Akita			39°44′14″N 140°04′50″E		

== Municipal Historic Sites ==
As of 1 May 2025, a further one hundred and seventy-five Sites have been designated as being of municipal importance.

== See also ==
- Cultural Properties of Japan
- Dewa Province
- Mutsu Province
- Akita Prefectural Museum
- List of Cultural Properties of Japan - paintings (Akita)
- List of Places of Scenic Beauty of Japan (Akita)
