= Hirafuku Hyakusui =

Japanese painter (1877–1933)

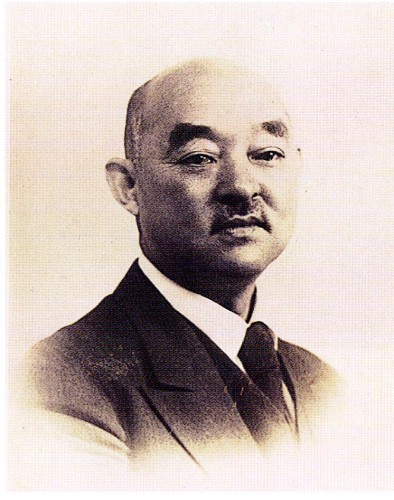
Hirafuku Hyakusui (1920s)

Hirafuku Hyakusui, originally named Teizō (Japanese: 平福 百穂; 28 December 1877, Kakunodate - 30 October 1933, Kakunodate) was a Japanese painter in the nihonga style.

== Life and work ==
His father, Hirafuku Suian, was also a painter and gave him his first lessons. In 1894, he went to Tokyo, where he studied with Kawabata Gyokushō. Three years later, he enrolled at the Tokyo Art School (now the Tokyo University of the Arts) and studied nihonga style art. He also began exhibiting at the Association of Young Japanese Artists and the Japan Arts Association and was awarded prizes at both. In 1900, together with Yuki Somai, Shimazaki Yanagi and several others, he helped create the "Musei-kai", a group devoted to introducing more realistic elements into the traditional styles.

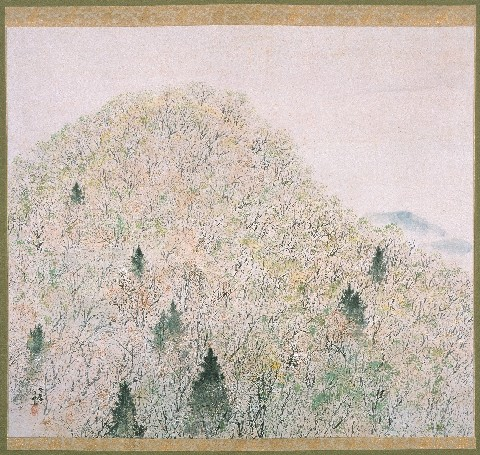
Haruyama (Spring Mountain)

After a year of studying Western style design, he began producing illustrations for the Kokumin Shimbun (The Nation), a daily newspaper that was considered to be a quasi-official mouthpiece for the government. In 1914, he won some awards at the eighth exhibition (Bunten) of the Ministry of Culture. Two years later, he joined with Kaburagi Kiyokata, Matsuoka Eikyū and others to create another artists' group, the "Kinrei-sha" (Golden Bell), which promoted artistic freedom and personal expression. In 1922, he became a judge for the Teiten exhibition, the successor to the Bunten.

In 1930, he visited Rome to participate in an exhibition of Japanese artists. The following year, he was involved in a similar exhibition at the Prussian Academy of Arts in Berlin. Upon his return to Japan, he was named a member of the Japan Art Academy. In 1932, he became a teacher at the Tokyo Fine Arts School, but died after having served for only a little more than a year.

His mature works combined the official nihonga style with the lighter techniques of the Rinpa school. He also showed some influence from the Chinese-based Nanga style. In addition, he wrote some poetry which was published in the literary magazine Araragi and collected in an anthology called "Kanchiku" (Chinese Bamboos).

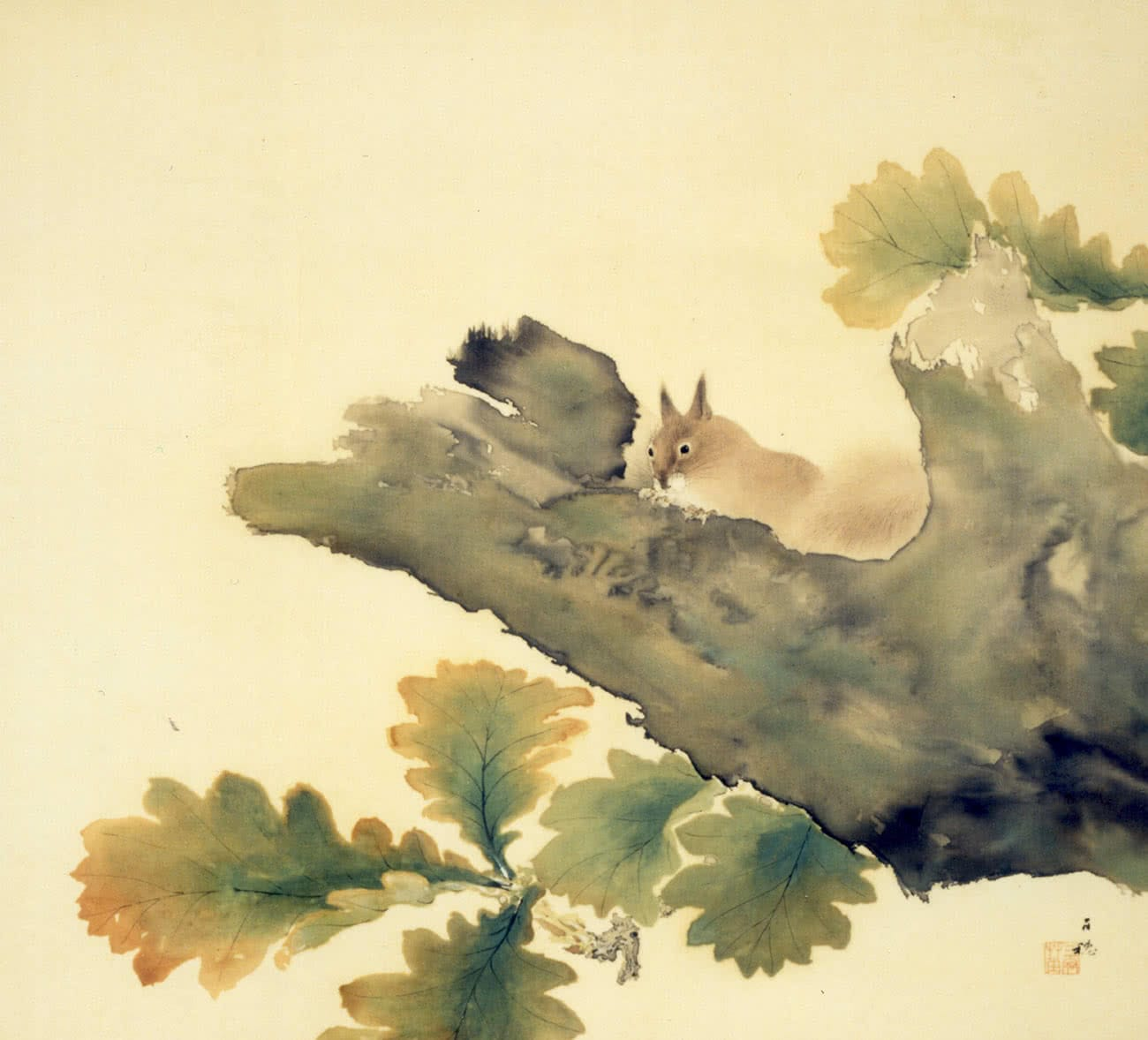
Squirrel (in the tarashikomi technique)

A major exhibition of his small paintings and scroll hangings was held at the Gallery Gunji (Tokyo) in April 2019.

== Sources ==
- Tazawa Yutaka: Biographical Dictionary of Japanese Art. Kodansha International, 1981. ISBN 0-87011-488-3.
- Laurance P. Roberts: A Dictionary of Japanese Artists. Weatherhill, 1976. ISBN 0-8348-0113-2.
