= Tentoku-ji =

Buddhist temple in Akita, Akita, Japan

- 天徳寺
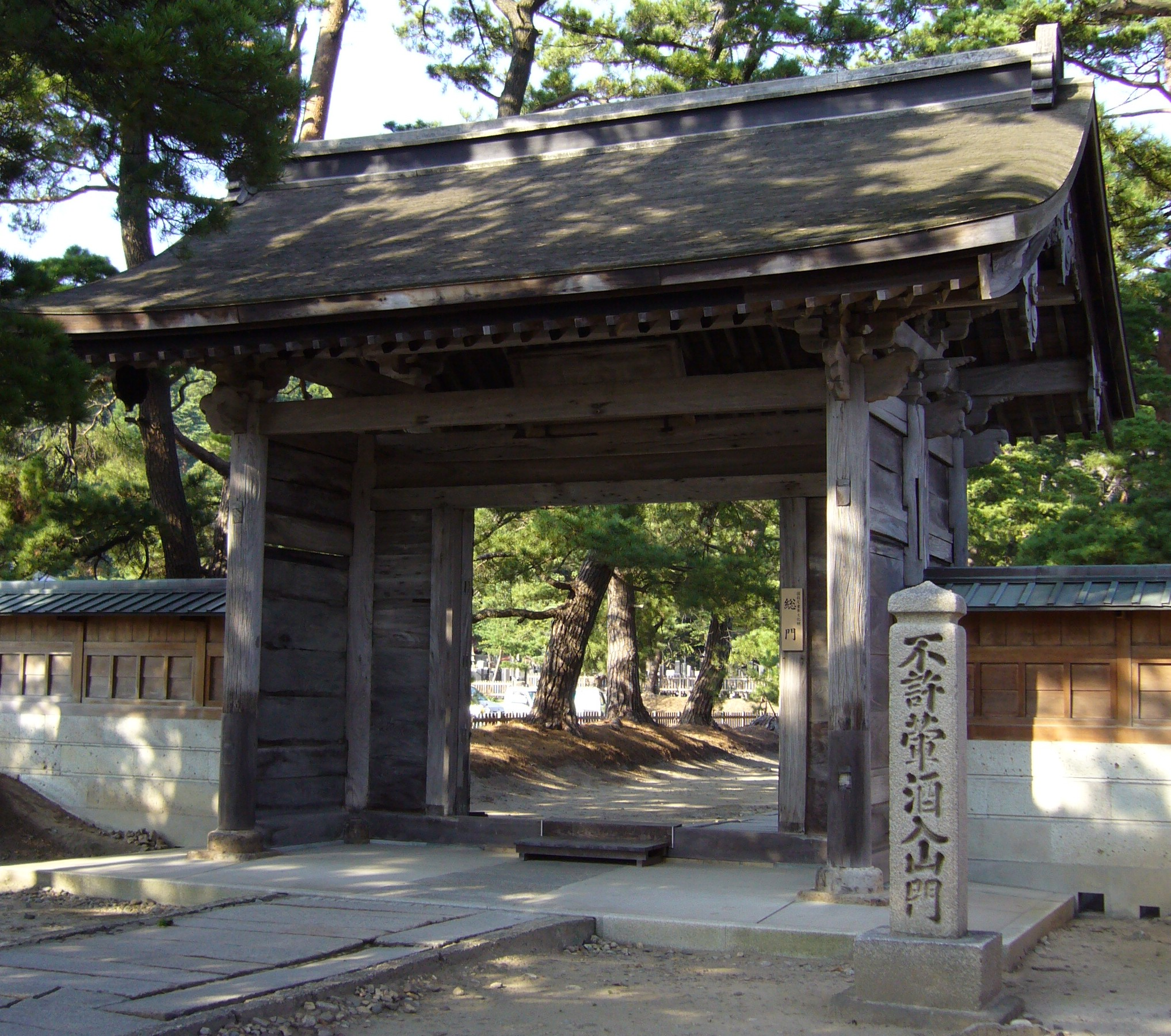
- Tentoku-ji Sōmon (ICP)

- Location within Akita Prefecture Location within Japan

Religion
- Affiliation: Buddhist
- Deity: Sho-Kannon Bosatsu
- Rite: Sōtō
- Status: functional

Location
- Location: 10-1 Izumimitakene, Akita-shim Akita-ken
- Country: Japan
- Coordinates: 39°44′19.19″N 140°7′12.09″E

Architecture
- Founder: Satake clan
- Completed: 1462 in Hitachi Province located to Dewa Province in 1602

Website
- Official website
- Important Cultural Property Akita Prefecture Historic Site

Tentoku-ji (天徳寺) is a Buddhist temple located in the Izumimitakene neighborhood of the city of Akita, Akita Prefecture, Japan. It is a temple of the Sōtō school and its honzon is a statue of Sho-Kannon Bosatsu. The temple's full name is Mango-zan Tentoku-ji (萬固山 勝福寺). The temple is the bodaiji the Satake clan, daimyō of Kubota Domain in the Edo Period. Its grounds are designated an Akita Prefectural Historic Site.

== History ==
In 1462, Satake Yoshinori, the head of the Satake clan during the Muromachi period, founded the temple in Ota Village, Kuji District, Hitachi Province (present-day Hitachiota, Ibaraki) as a memorial temple for his wife (the daughter of Satake Yoshimori). In 1590, it moved to Reishōzan in Mito, the current location of the Mito Tōshō-gū. In 1602, following the transfer of the Satake clan, it was relocated to Narayama in Narayama Village, Akita District, Dewa Province (present-day Kinshōjiyama). However, on December 27, 1624 the temple was completely destroyed by fire, with only the main gate surviving. The following May, it was rebuilt in its current location in Izumiyama, Izumi Village, Akita District. The main gate was also relocated at this time. Then, in December 1676 another fire broke out, destroying the temple except for the main gate and the Sanmon gate. It took nine years to rebuild, and the current structures date from this time.

In 1672, the Satake clan cemetery was built to west of the main hall, enshrining the spirits of successive lords of Kubota Domain. In 1998, the graves of the principal wives and concubines, which had been located at Sōzen-ji in Tokyo, were moved to this cemetery. In 1990, four buildings—the main hall, the study hall, the temple gate, and the main gate—along with the Satake family mausoleum were designated as National Important Cultural Properties.

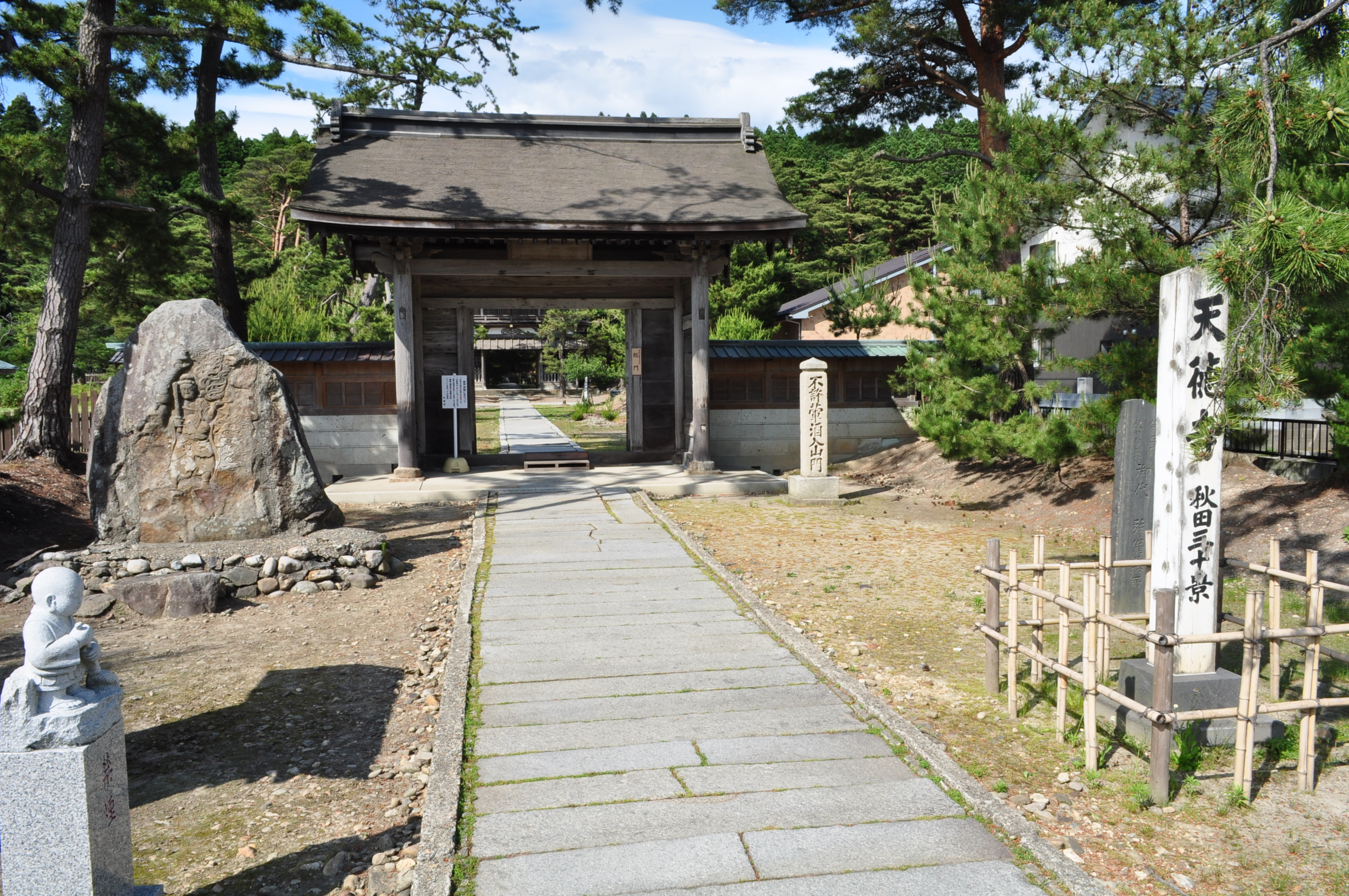
View of the Sōmon gate from the public road

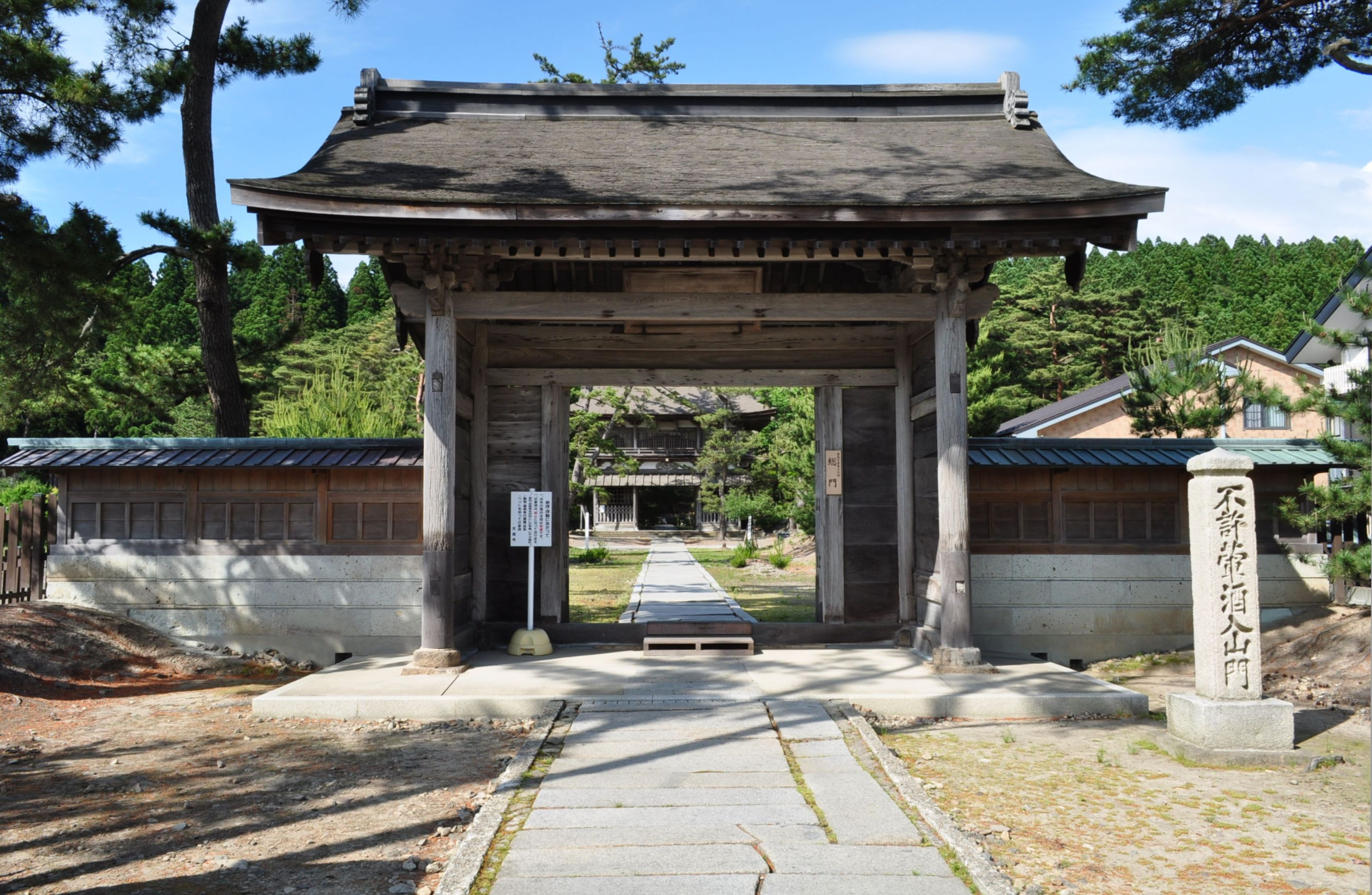
View of the Sōmon gate from the approach road

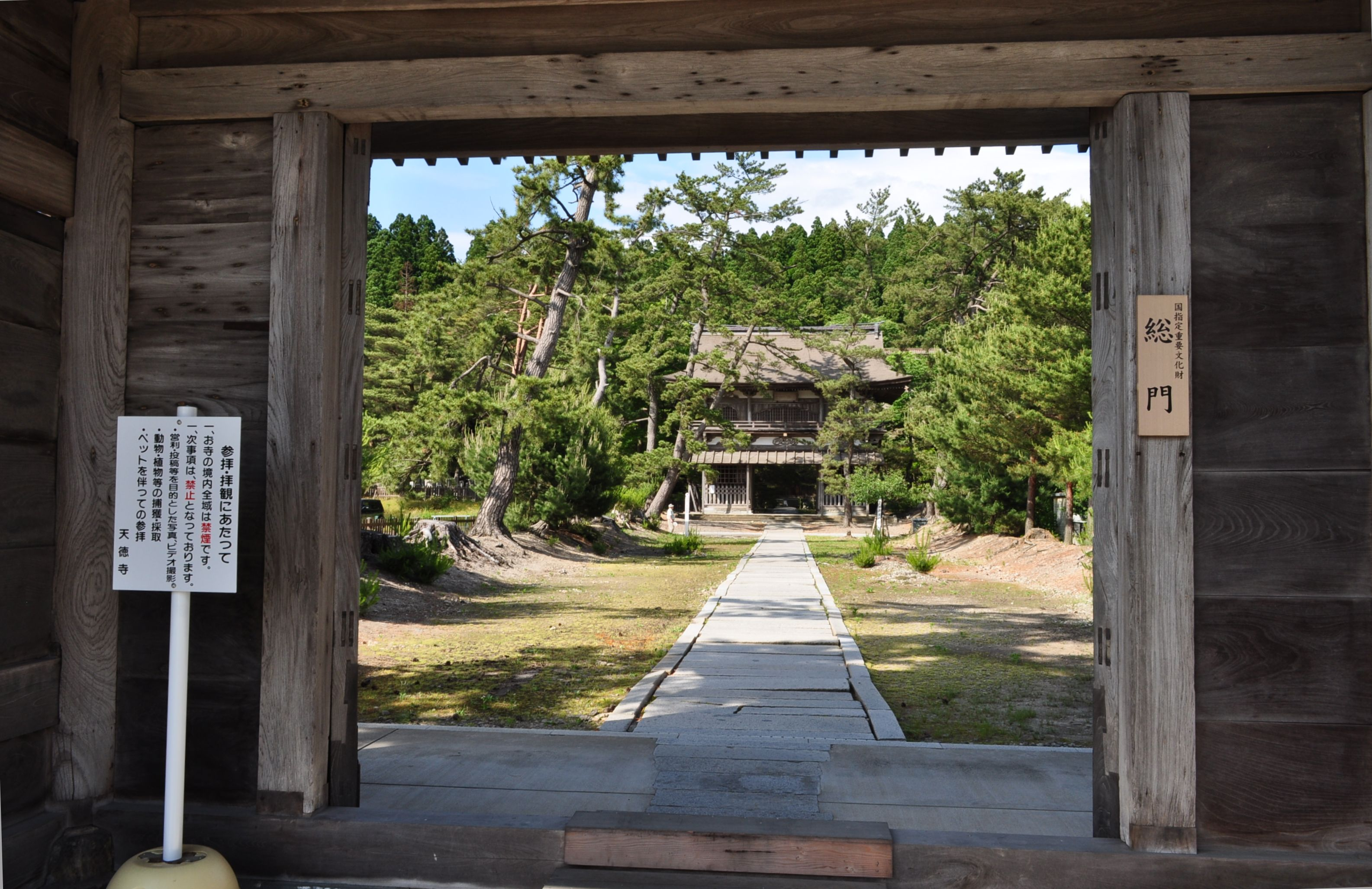
View of the Sanmon gate from the Sōmon gate

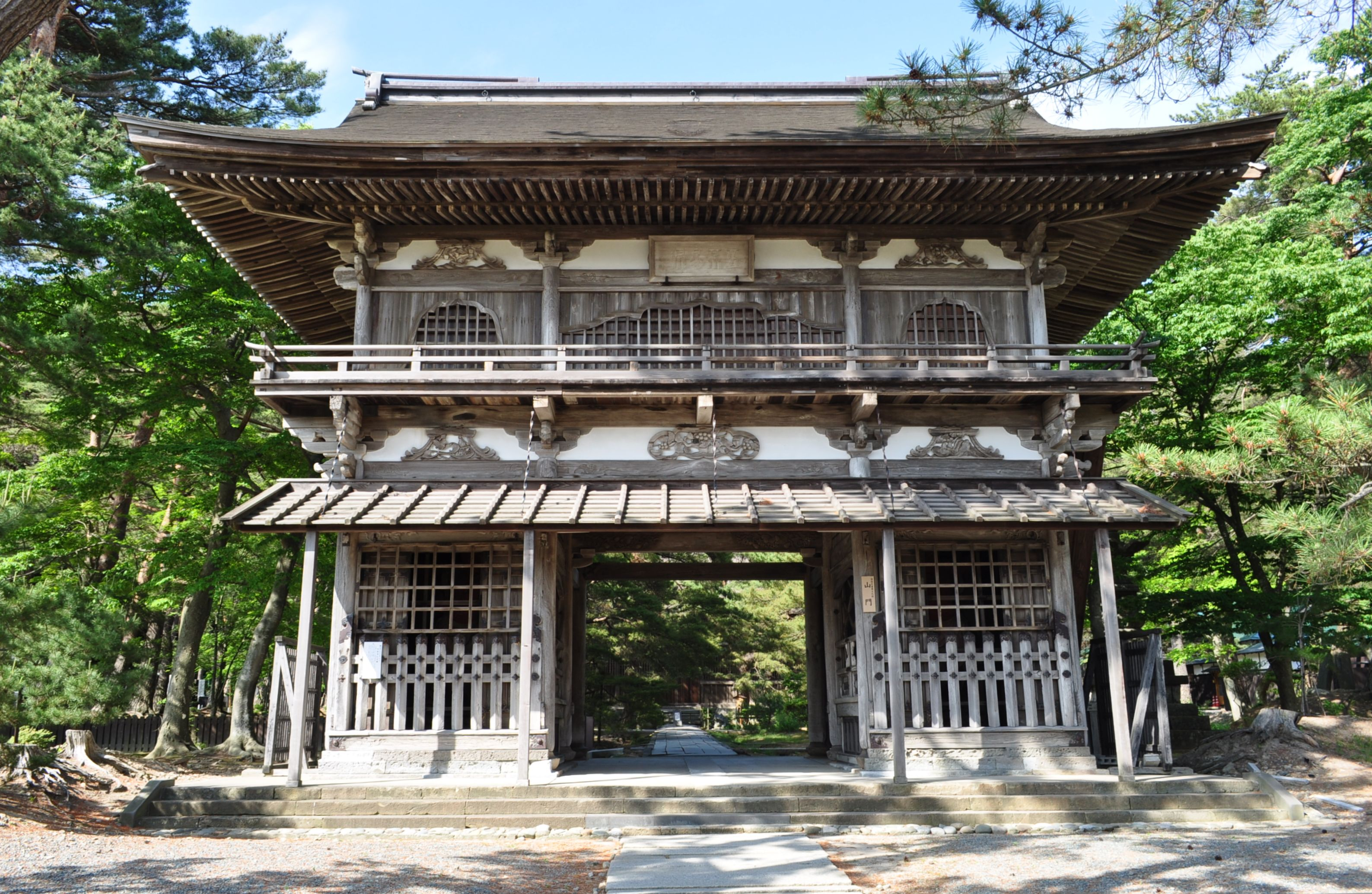
View of the Sanmon gate from the approach road

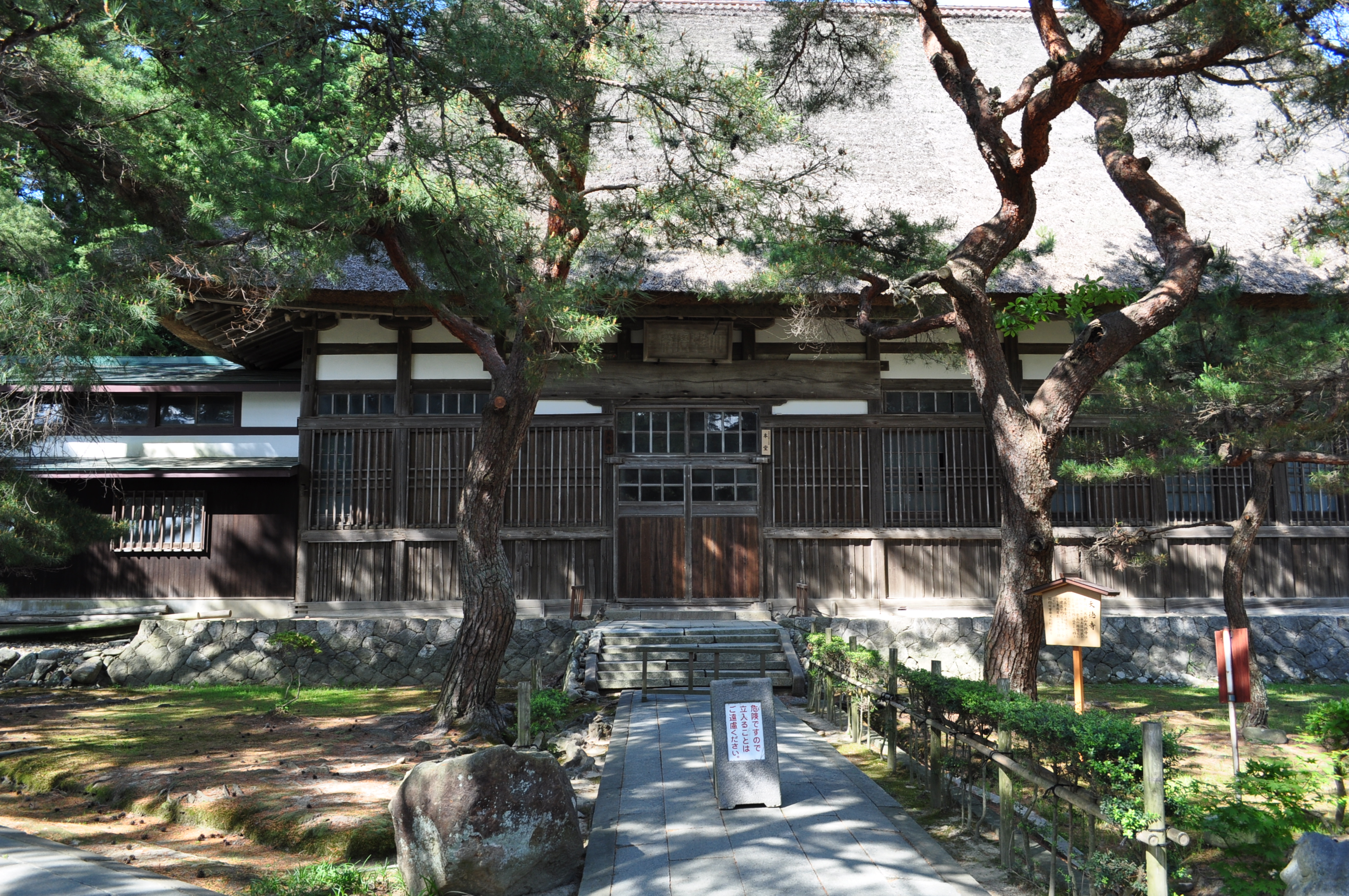
View of the main hall from the approach road

== Access ==
The temple is a 15-minute drive from Akita Station on JR East.

== Cultural Properties ==
=== National Important Cultural Properties ===
- Hondō (本堂) Edo Period, built in 1687. A large building with a hipped gable thatched roof, and a frontage of approximately 30 meters. The interior is divided into eight rooms: four on each side and two rows in the front and back, with a wooden-floored veranda at the front. The entrance is on the right side of the front of the building, and the founder's hall is attached to the left side of the rear.
- Shoin (書院) Edo Period, built in 1806. Located to the east of the main hall. It has a hipped roof and is covered with iron plates. It contains an upper room used as a resting place for the daimyō when visiting the tombs.
- Sanmon (山門) Edo Period, built in 1709. A three-bay, single-story gate (three bays with a central passageway), with a tiled roof.
- Sōmon (総門) Azuchi-Momoyama Period (1596-1614). A four-legged gate with a gabled and tiled roof.
- Satake clan mausoleum (佐竹家霊屋) Edo Period, built in 1672. Located in the cemetery area west of the main hall. It is a hip-and-gable roof structure with iron sheeting.

== See also ==
- List of Historic Sites of Japan (Akita)
