= Akita Museum of Art =

- 秋田県立美術館 平野政吉コレクション
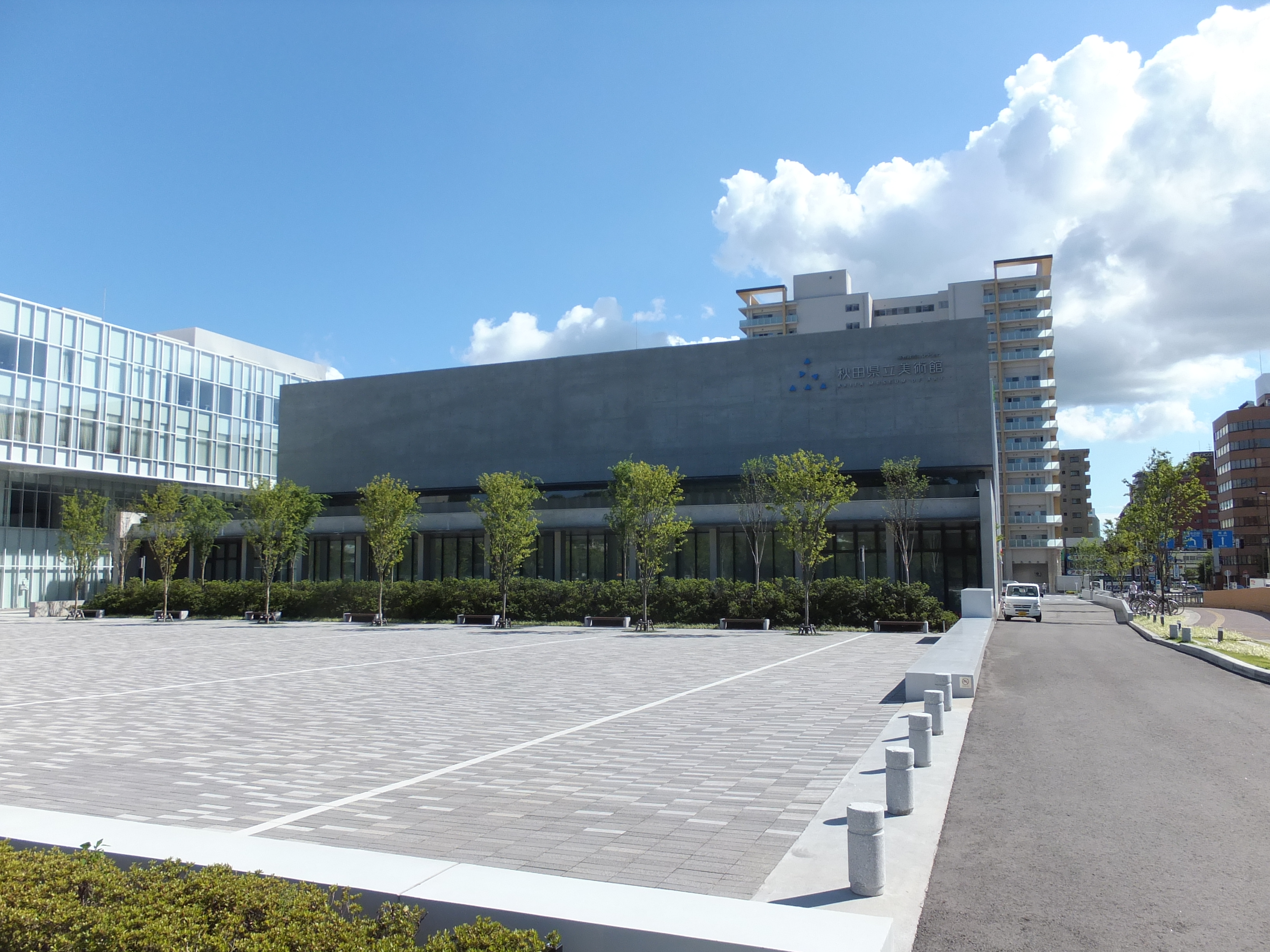

General information
- Location: 1-4-2 Nakadori, Akita, Akita Prefecture, Japan
- Coordinates: 39°43′2.74″N 140°7′17.4″E
- Opened: May 5, 1967
- Inaugurated: September 28, 2013

Technical details
- Floor count: 3 above ground, 1 underground
- Floor area: 3,746.66 m2

Design and construction
- Architect: Tadao Ando

Website
- common.pref.akita.lg.jp/art-museum/

Akita Museum of Art (秋田県立美術館 平野政吉コレクション, Akita Kenritsu Bijutsukan Hirano Masakichi Collection) is an art museum in the city of Akita.

The original Akita Prefectural Museum of Art was opened on May 5, 1967. The new museum was opened on September 28, 2013. The main exhibit is a collection of works by Tsuguharu Foujita from the collection of the Masakichi Hirano Art Foundation. The museum has two additional galleries for rotating exhibitions. The triangular-shaped building was designed by award-winning architect Tadao Ando.

Some features of the museum architecture include a free-standing staircase and a triangular skylight which greet visitors as they enter the building. There are also glass panels along one side of the building on the second floor where the museum shop and cafe are, which offer views of Senshu Park (the former site of Akita Castle). The paid area of the museum begins on the second floor; however, admission to the cafe and museum shop is free.
