= Akita Prefectural Museum =

- 秋田県立博物館
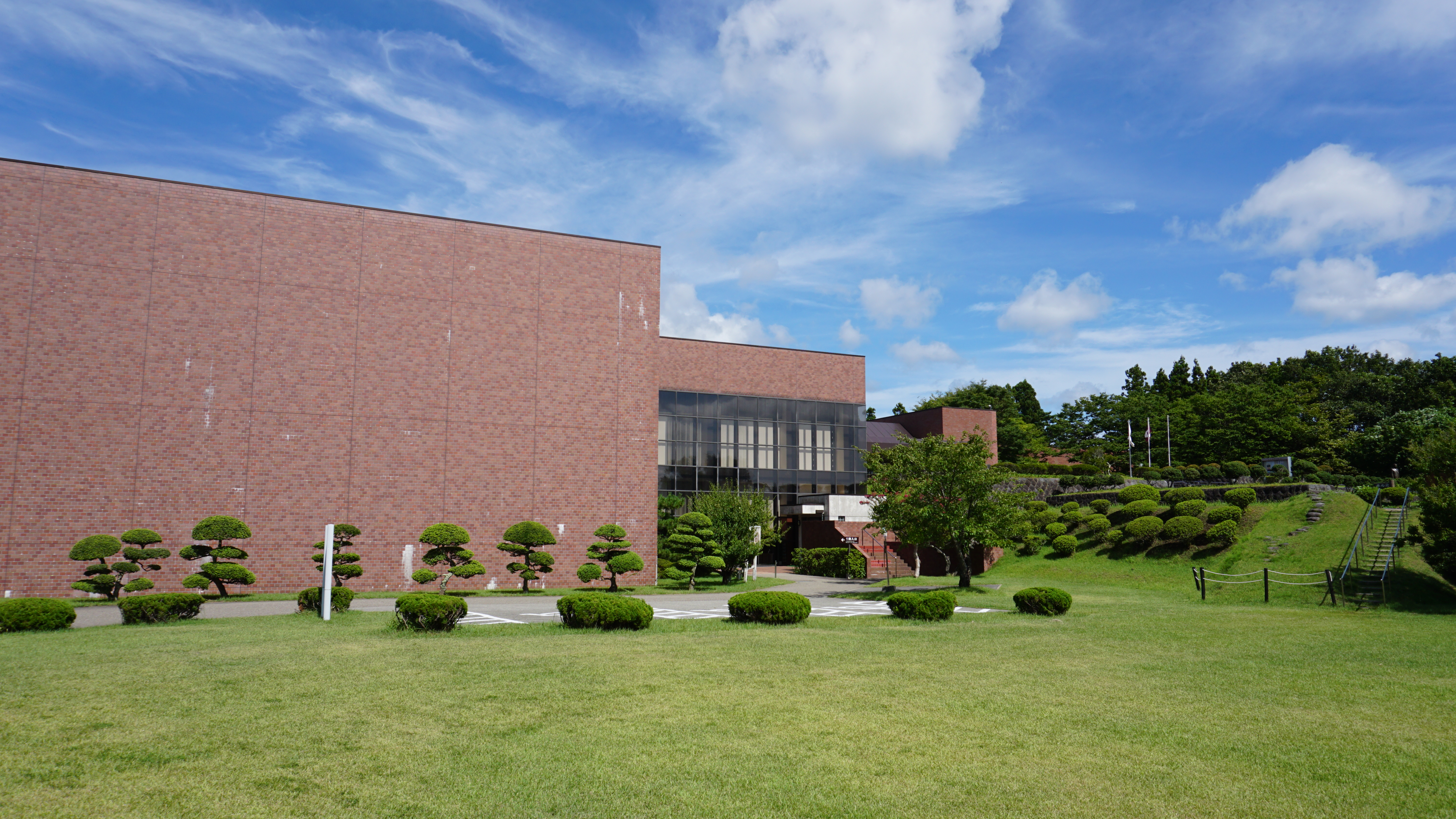

General information
- Location: 52 Ushiroyama, Kanaashiniozaki, Akita, Akita Prefecture, Japan
- Coordinates: 39°49′2″N 140°3′58″E
- Opened: 1975
- Renovated: 2004

Website
- homepage

Akita Prefectural Museum (秋田県立博物館, Akita Kenritsu Hakubutsukan) is a prefectural museum in the city of Akita, Japan. It houses a comprehensive display of archaeological artifacts, crafts, biological and geological samples pertaining to the history and folklore of Akita Prefecture.

The museum opened in May 1975 and reopened after renovations in April 2004.

== See also ==
- Dewa Province
- Mutsu Province
- List of Historic Sites of Japan (Akita)
