= Akita ranga =

School of painting within the larger Japanese genre of ranga

Akita ranga (秋田蘭画), also known as the Akita-ha (秋田派), was a short-lived school of painting within the larger Japanese genre of ranga, or Dutch-style painting which lasted roughly from 1773 to 1780. Based in Kubota Domain, a feudal domain, in the Tōhoku region of Honshū, northern Japan, in what is now Akita Prefecture, it was headed by the domain's lord Satake Shozan and his retainer Odano Naotake. Though many ranga artists, most prominently Shiba Kōkan, produced works on European themes, the Akita painters for the most part painted traditional Japanese themes and compositions using Western-style techniques and an approximation of oil paints.

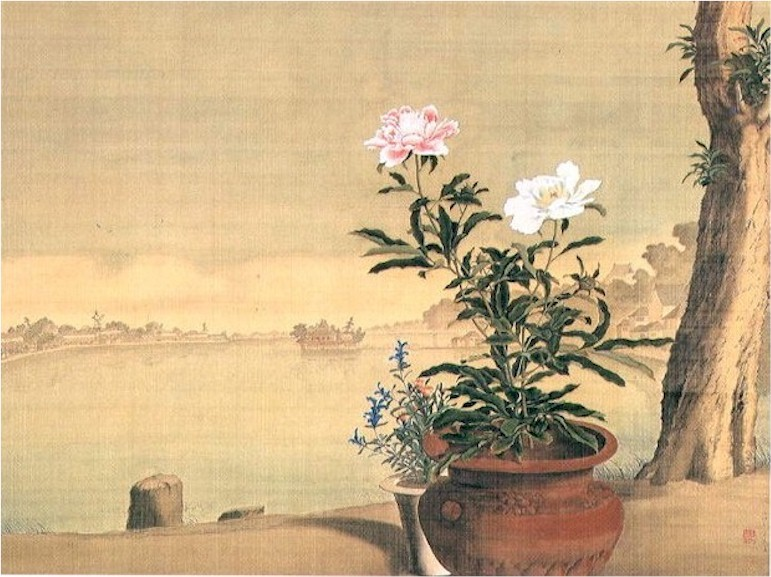
Odano Naotake Toeizan Shinobazuike（1770s）Akita Museum of Modern Art

Some of the chief features that distinguish Akita ranga from traditional Japanese painting (nihonga) are the inclusion of shadows, the use of perspective, reflections in water, and the use of blue for sky and sea. In addition, ranga artists left little or no blank space on a work, emulating Western art traditions and going against East Asian ones, and used oils and resins in addition to Japanese pigments to simulate the appearance of oil paint. Many of their works feature a large foreground subject which displays techniques in light and shadow, with a small, distant, landscape, displaying an understanding of perspective projection techniques.

== History ==
The school got its start when rangaku (Dutch studies) scholar Hiraga Gennai was invited to help advise the domain on the management of its copper mines. The area was a primary provider of copper to the archipelago in this period, much of which was also exported via Dutch traders based at Nagasaki. Though Gennai is known primarily as a physician, botanist and inventor, he was a ranga painter as well, and mentored Shozan in Western artistic techniques.

Odano Naotake, one of Shozan's chief retainers, was then sent to Edo to live and study with Gennai for five years, and it is believed that he likely came into contact with a number of other artists and rangaku scholars during this time. Returning to Akita, he composed, along with Shozan, three treatises on Western style painting. These were among the first of their kind to be produced in Japan.

The school worked primarily from sketchbooks and from life studies of plants, birds, and insects. Since its members were all fairly wealthy, and of the samurai class, they had little need to sell their works, but their influence was felt by some commercial artists, including Shiba Kōkan.

Hiraga Gennai was arrested and imprisoned in 1779 for killing one of his disciples in anger and frustration; he killed himself soon afterwards. Odano Naotake, being closely associated with Gennai, was dismissed from his official position in Edo. The movement came to an end shortly after the death of Odano Naotake in 1780 and Satake Shozan in 1785.

== Main artists ==
- Satake Shozan
- Odano Naotake
- Satake Yoshimi
