= Wild Life (manga) =

Japanese manga series

- First tankōbon volume cover, featuring Tesshō Iwashiro

ワイルドライフ (Wairudo Raifu)
- Manga
- Written by: Masato Fujisaki
- Published by: Shogakukan
- Imprint: Shōnen Sunday Comics
- Magazine: Weekly Shōnen Sunday
- Original run: December 11, 2002 – January 23, 2008
- Volumes: 27
- Television drama
- Directed by: Toru Kawashima, Yukinari Hanawa
- Written by: Taro Yamada; Toru Kawashima; Yukiko Manabe
- Studio: Asia Content Center
- Original network: NHK
- Original run: July 31, 2008 – August 1, 2008
- Episodes: 3 (1 unaired)
- icon

Wild Life (Japanese: ワイルドライフ, Hepburn: Wairudo Raifu) is a Japanese manga series written and illustrated by Masato Fujisaki. It was serialized in Shogakukan's shōnen manga magazine Weekly Shōnen Sunday from December 2002 to January 2008, with its chapters collected in 27 tankōbon volumes. It follows a high school juvenile delinquent, Tesshō Iwashiro, working to become a veterinarian.

A live-action adaptation was scheduled for March 2008. However, NHK announced the cancellation of the drama in January 2008, when a giraffe and her calf suddenly died at the Akita Omoriyama Zoo where it was being filmed. NHK stated later that week that they would air two of the three completed episodes as stand-alone stories.

In 2006, Wild Life received the 51st Shogakukan Manga Award for the shōnen category.

== Plot ==
Tesshō is a typical high school delinquent with a special skill. He has a perfect pitch. This skill enables him to hear things most people would not. After helping a local vet, Kashiyuu, save a small dog, whom he later names Inu (Japanese for "dog"), Tesshō realizes his calling in life is to become a veterinarian. After passing veterinary school Tesshō finds himself out of a job and out of luck. But due to some connections with an old high school friend, Tesshō is allowed to take the test to enter the famous R.E.D. Vet hospital.

== Characters ==
Tesshō Iwashiro (岩城 鉄生, Iwashiro Tesshō)
A high school delinquent with a perfect pitch. He does not care for his future until he saves a dog and decides he wants to become a vet. He adopts the dog and names it "Inu" (犬). Currently, he is a vet at R.E.D and is in Section 2, meaning he cares for wildlife. Sometimes he is misunderstood as being incompetent because of his blond hair. Thus his nickname is "Blond Haired #1 Idiot Vet in Japan". However, he is a very capable vet and has treated a human in one case. He is also afraid of ghosts.
Mika Senō (瀬能 みか, Senō Mika)
A nurse at R.E.D hospital. She is Tesshō's assistant and accompanies him on worldwide missions. She often thinks that Tesshō is an idiot but respects him very much. It is hinted that she might like him.
Tsukasa Ryōtō (陵刀 司, Ryōtō Tsukasa)
The head of Section 2 who has a sense of absolute insight of animals. Since he was young, he was taken on worldwide trips with his father to gain knowledge and experience to become a vet. Because of this, he can now see through symptoms within seconds. His father is a world-famous vet and is known as "Professor Ryōtō". He wants Tsukasa to become his successor even though Tsukasa wants to stay a vet at R.E.D. His real age is unknown but compared to the recent storyline, he still retains his youthfulness from 20 years ago. He is rumored to be bisexual and appears to like Tesshō. He also has a beautiful grandmother who recently had her 100th birthday but still looks like a 25-year-old. He is shown to be quite lazy as he often tries to avoid large tasks or assignments giving to him.
Hisataka Kurachi (鞍智 久孝, Kurachi Hisataka)
He is a member of Section 2 who had been assigned from Section 3. He graduated from Teito Veterinary College Doctorate Program but he works in R.E.D because of his admiration for Ryōtō and his father. At first, his way of thinking is quite like the "regular vets" who do not work at R.E.D. However, after he is told that Tesshō is more capable than him, he strives to outshine Tesshō and become a better vet. From Tesshō and Ryōtō he learns that a vet also needs to treat the heart and soul of the patient and their owners. From this, he tries hard to smile and care for his patients but ends up scaring them away.
Inu
Tesshō's pet and a nurse dog.

== Media ==
=== Manga ===
Wild Life, written and illustrated by Masato Fujisaki, was serialized in Shogakukan's Weekly Shōnen Sunday from December 11, 2002, to January 23, 2008. Shogakukan collected its chapters in twenty-seven tankōbon volumes, released from April 18, 2003, to June 18, 2008.

==== Volumes ====
No.	Japanese release date	Japanese ISBN
1	April 18, 2003	978-4-09-126421-3
2	June 18, 2003	978-4-09-126422-0
3	August 8, 2003	978-4-09-126423-7
4	November 18, 2003	978-4-09-126424-4
5	January 17, 2004	978-4-09-126425-1
6	March 18, 2004	978-4-09-126426-8
7	May 18, 2004	978-4-09-126427-5
8	September 17, 2004	978-4-09-126428-2
9	October 18, 2004	978-4-09-126429-9
10	December 17, 2004	978-4-09-126430-5
11	March 20, 2005	978-4-09-127191-4
12	May 18, 2005	978-4-09-127192-1
13	July 15, 2005	978-4-09-127192-1
14	September 16, 2005	978-4-09-127194-5
15	December 15, 2005	978-4-09-127195-2
16	January 18, 2006	978-4-09-120049-5
17	April 18, 2006	978-4-09-120347-2
18	June 16, 2006	978-4-09-120438-7
19	September 15, 2006	978-4-09-120626-8
20	December 16, 2006	978-4-09-120700-5
21	February 16, 2007	978-4-09-121009-8
22	May 18, 2007	978-4-09-121060-9
23	August 10, 2007	978-4-09-121164-4
24	November 16, 2007	978-4-09-121209-2
25	March 18, 2008	978-4-09-121299-3
26	April 18, 2008	978-4-09-121384-6
27	June 18, 2008	978-4-09-121409-6

=== Drama ===
A Japanese television drama adaptation of the series had been scheduled for March 2008. However, NHK announced the cancellation of the drama on January 11, 2008, when a giraffe and her calf suddenly died at the Akita Omoriyama Zoo where it was being filmed. NHK stated later that week that they would air two of the three completed episodes as stand-alone stories.

== Reception ==
Wild Life received the 51st Shogakukan Manga Award for the shōnen category in 2006.
