= Akita Omoriyama Zoo =

Omoriyama Zoo

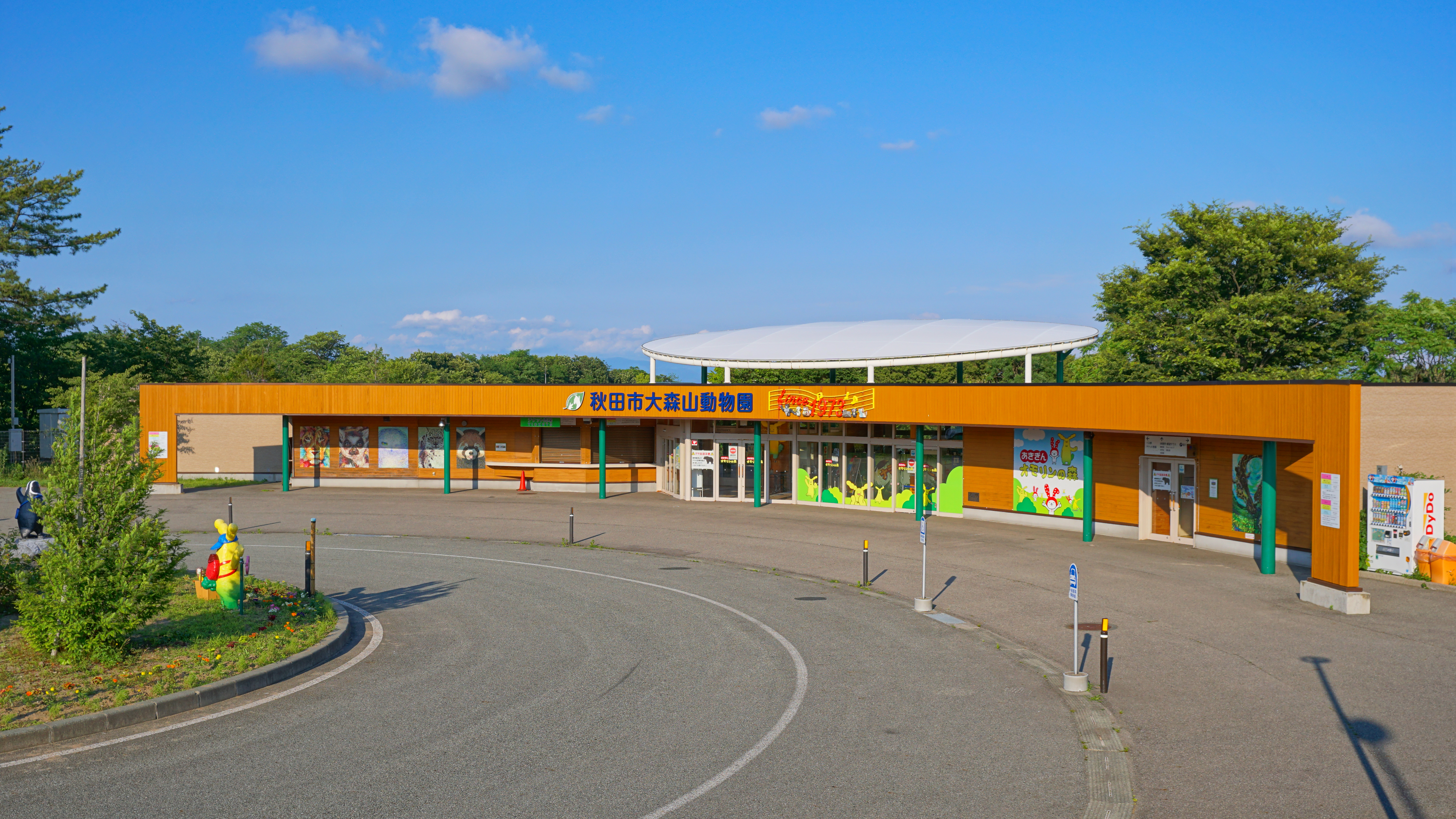
- Main gate
- Interactive map of Omoriyama Zoo
- 39°40′19.74″N 140°04′38.58″E
- Date opened: September 1972
- Location: Akita, Akita Prefecture, Japan
- No. of animals: 505
- No. of species: 114
- Annual visitors: 280,000 (2019)
- Memberships: JAZA
- Website: www.city.akita.lg.jp/zoo/

Akita City Children's Zoo 秋田市児童動物園

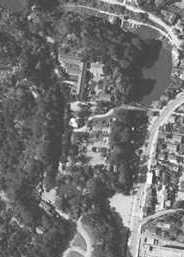
- Aerial view in 1967
- Interactive map of Akita City Children's Zoo 秋田市児童動物園
- Date opened: October 1950
- Date closed: 31 August 1972
- Location: Senshū Kōen
- Land area: 4,000 m^{2} (43,000 sq ft)
- No. of species: 40
- Annual visitors: 200,000
- Major exhibits: Akita's “Monkey Train”
- Owner: City of Akita, Akita prefecture
- Website: http://www.city.akita.akita.jp/city/in/zo/, https://www.city.akita.lg.jp/zoo/

The Akita Omoriyama Zoo (秋田市大森山動物園, Akitashi Omoriyama dōbutsuen), also known as “Milve”, is a municipal zoo opened in July 1967 in the city of Akita, Akita Prefecture, Japan. Opened in 1972, the zoo covers 15 hectares, with 114 species on display. It is accredited by the Japanese Association of Zoos and Aquariums (JAZA).

The zoo is modeled after Asahiyama Zoo in Hokkaido with holding areas designed to mimic the animal’s natural habitat, and incorporating “action exhibits” where animal activity is encouraged, particularly during feeding time.

== History ==
The zoo began as a zoo attached to the Akita Prefectural Children’s Hall within the grounds of former Kubota Castle (39°43′20.1″N 140°07′30″E) in October 1950. It was transferred to the control of Akita City in April 1953 and renamed the Akita City Children’s Zoo, and "Monkey Train ride" was very popular. In September 1972, it was relocated to its present location.

The zoo successfully bred the tanuki in captivity in 1974, followed by the barn owl in 1978, and Japanese marten in 1994. It also successfully artificially inseminated the black-backed jackal in 1990 and demoiselle crane in 1995. All of these successes were the first time for a zoo in Japan.

In March 2015, the zoo recorded its 10 millionth visitor since its relocation to its present location.

== Gallery ==
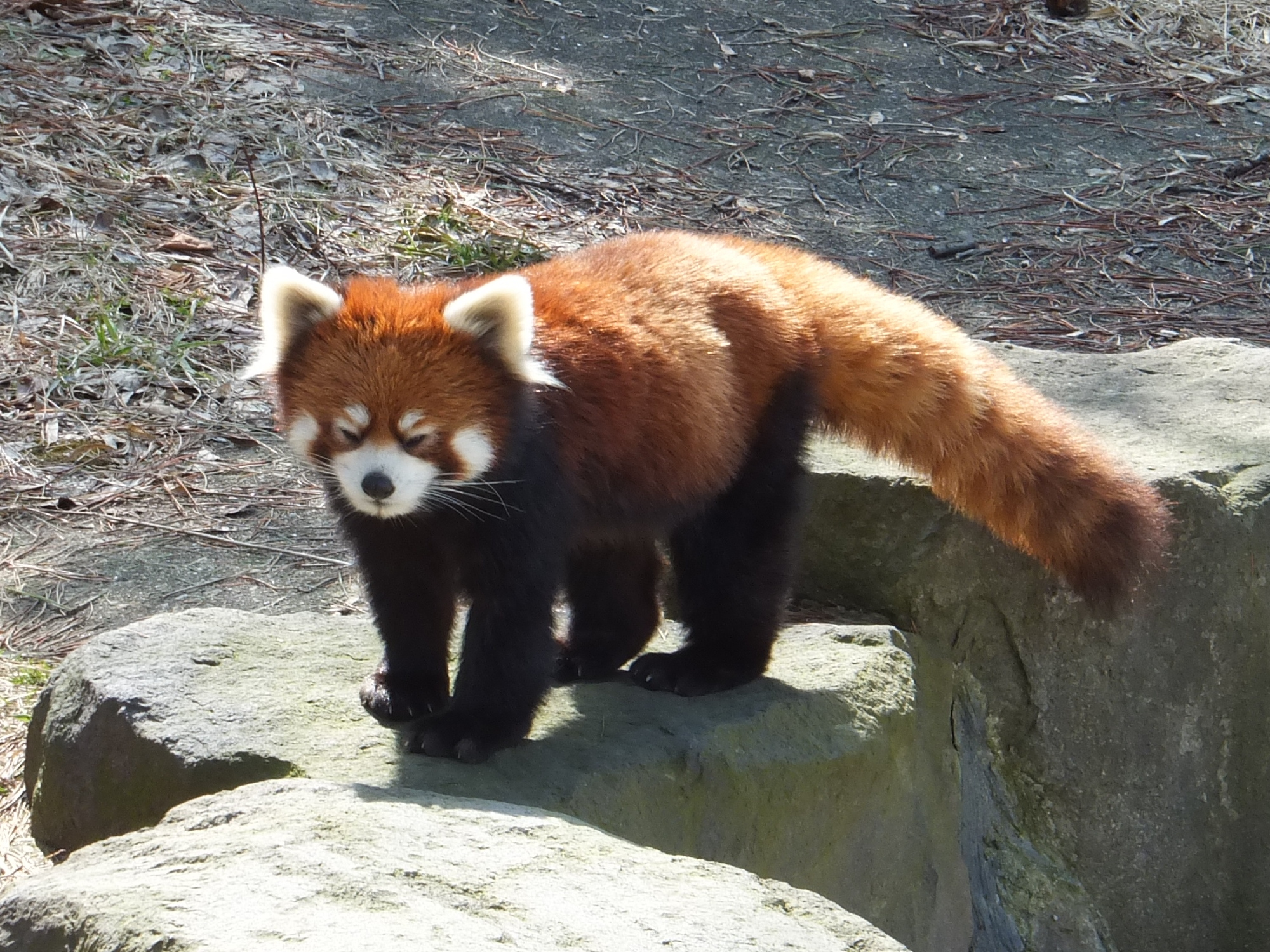

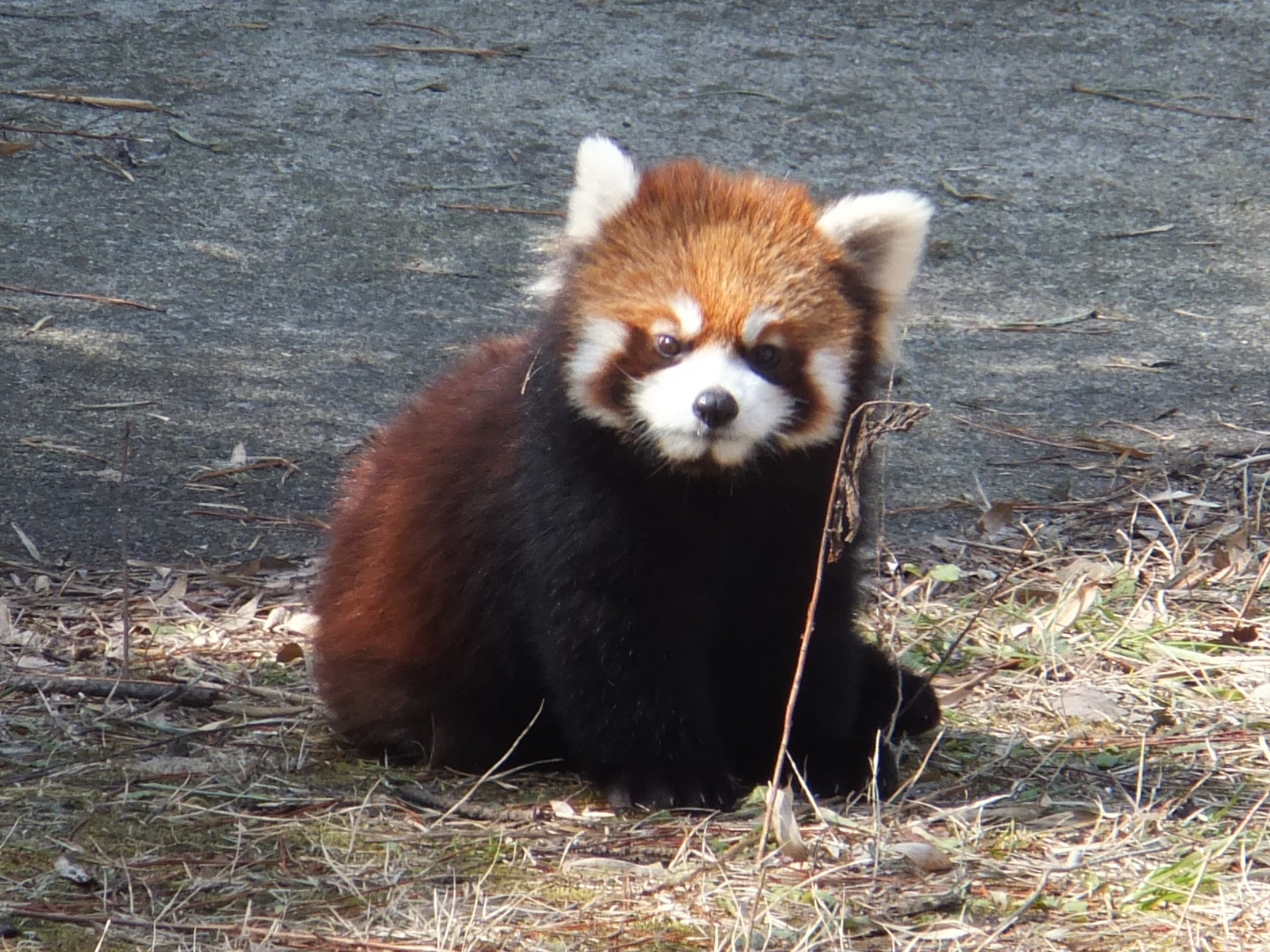
Red panda

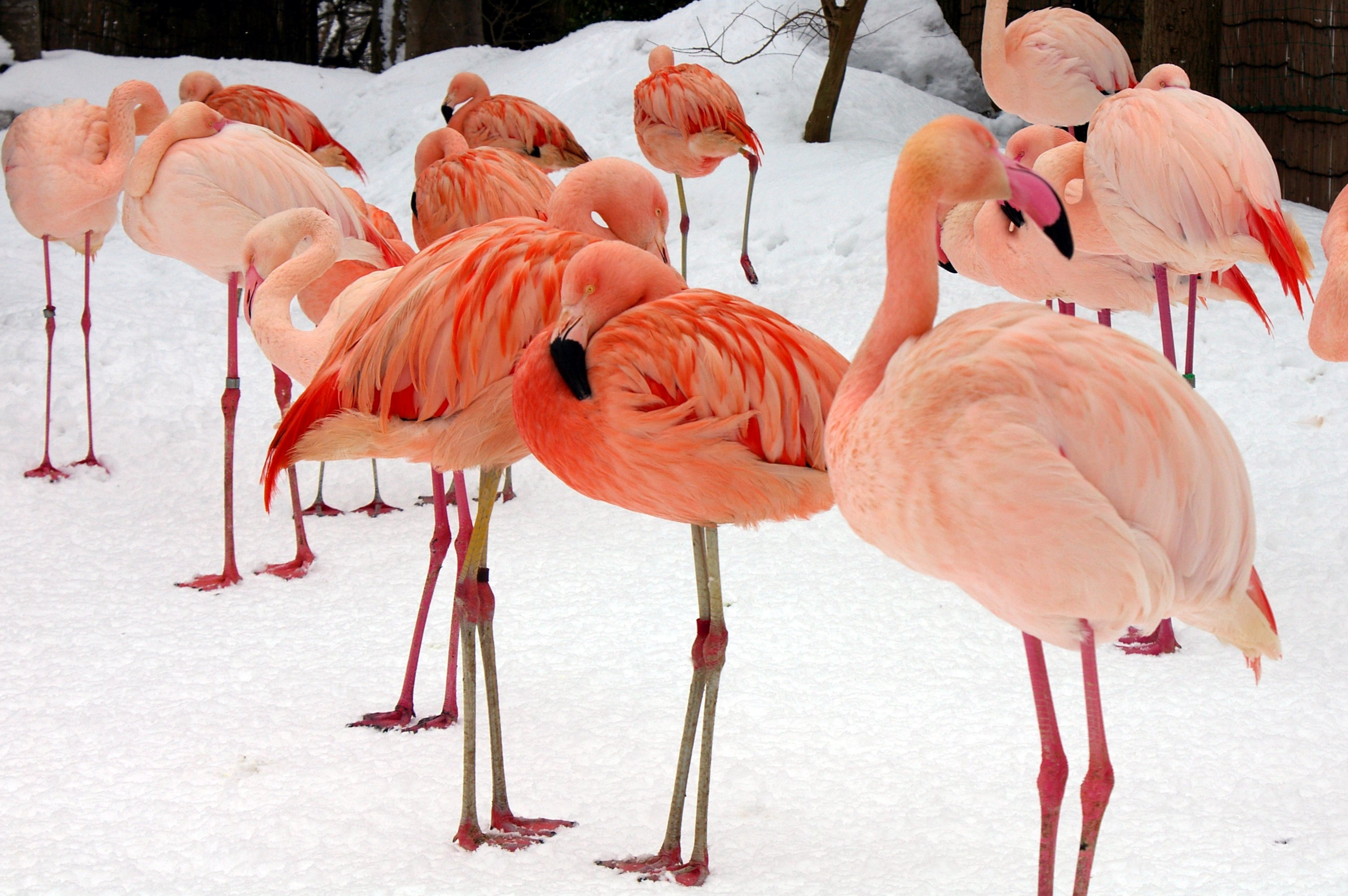

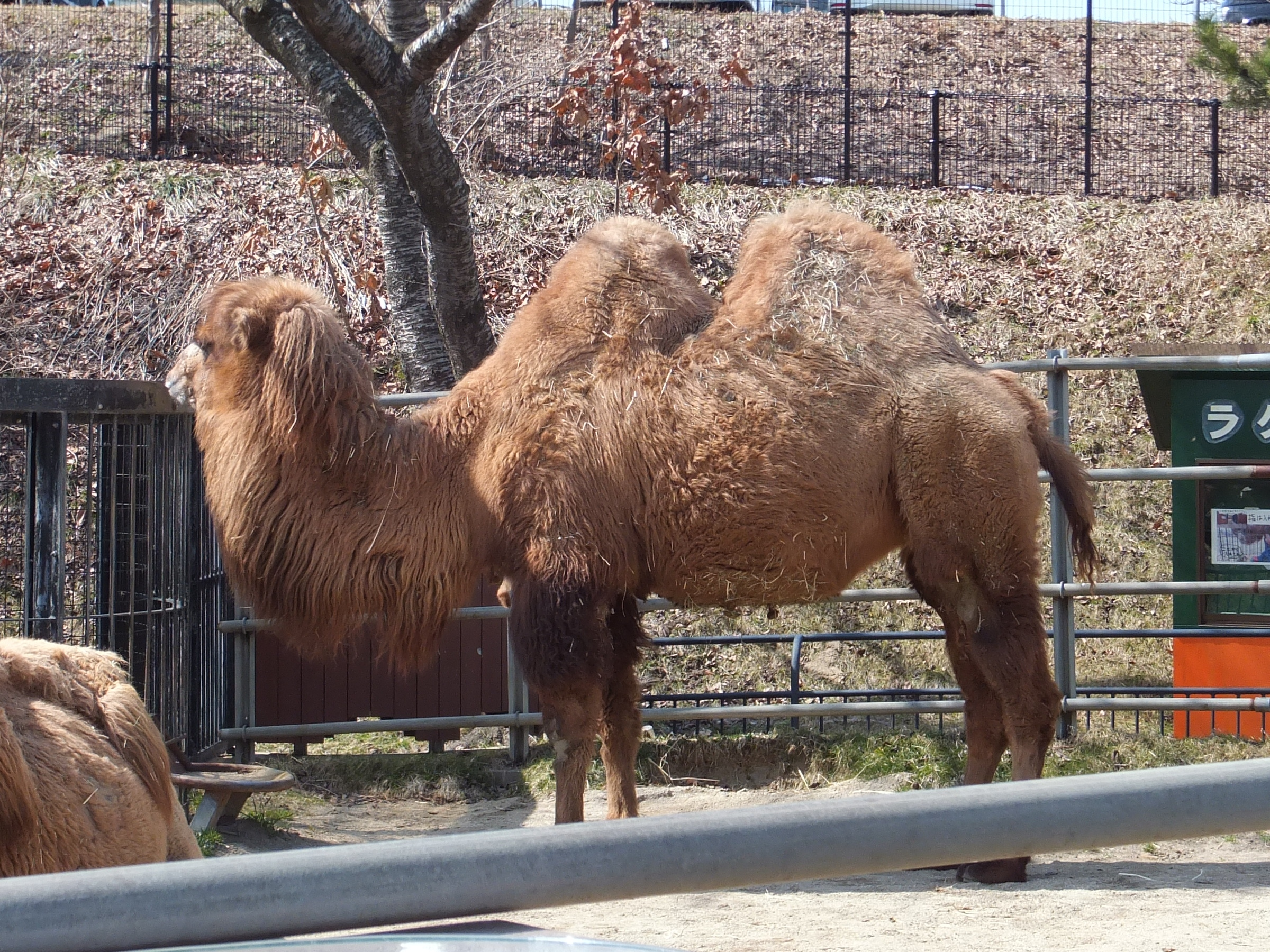
Bactrian camel

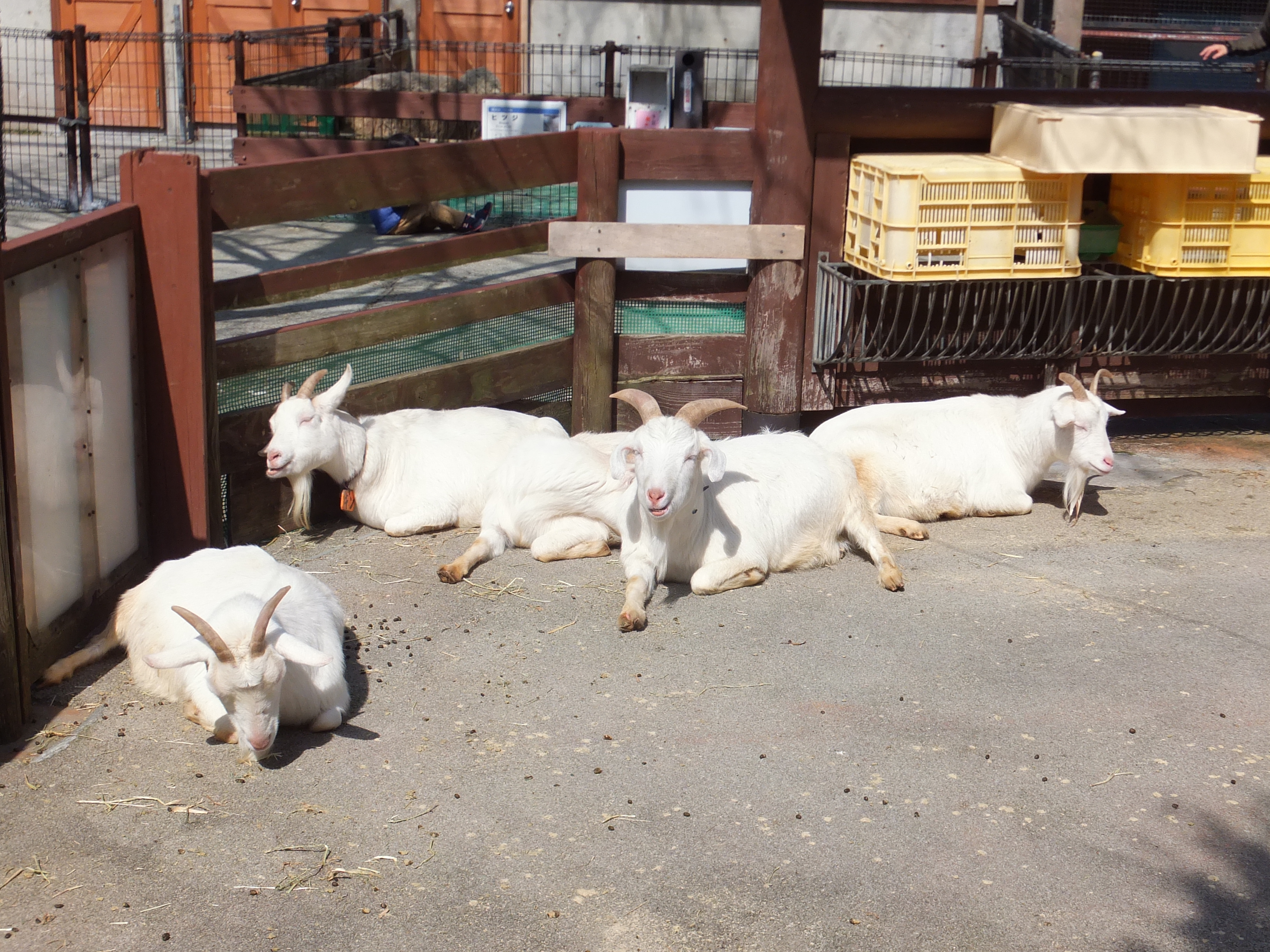
Shibayagi

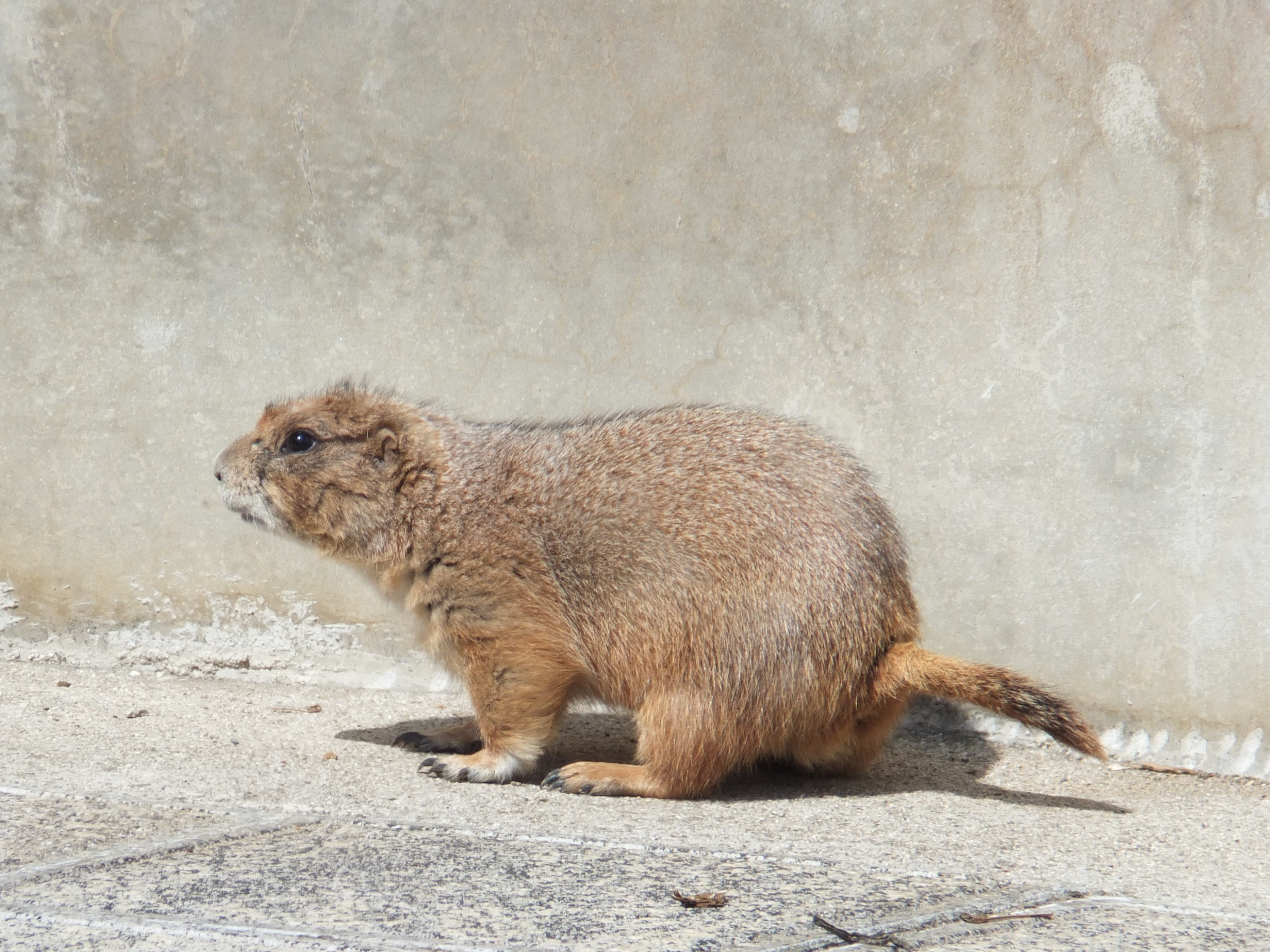
Prairie dog

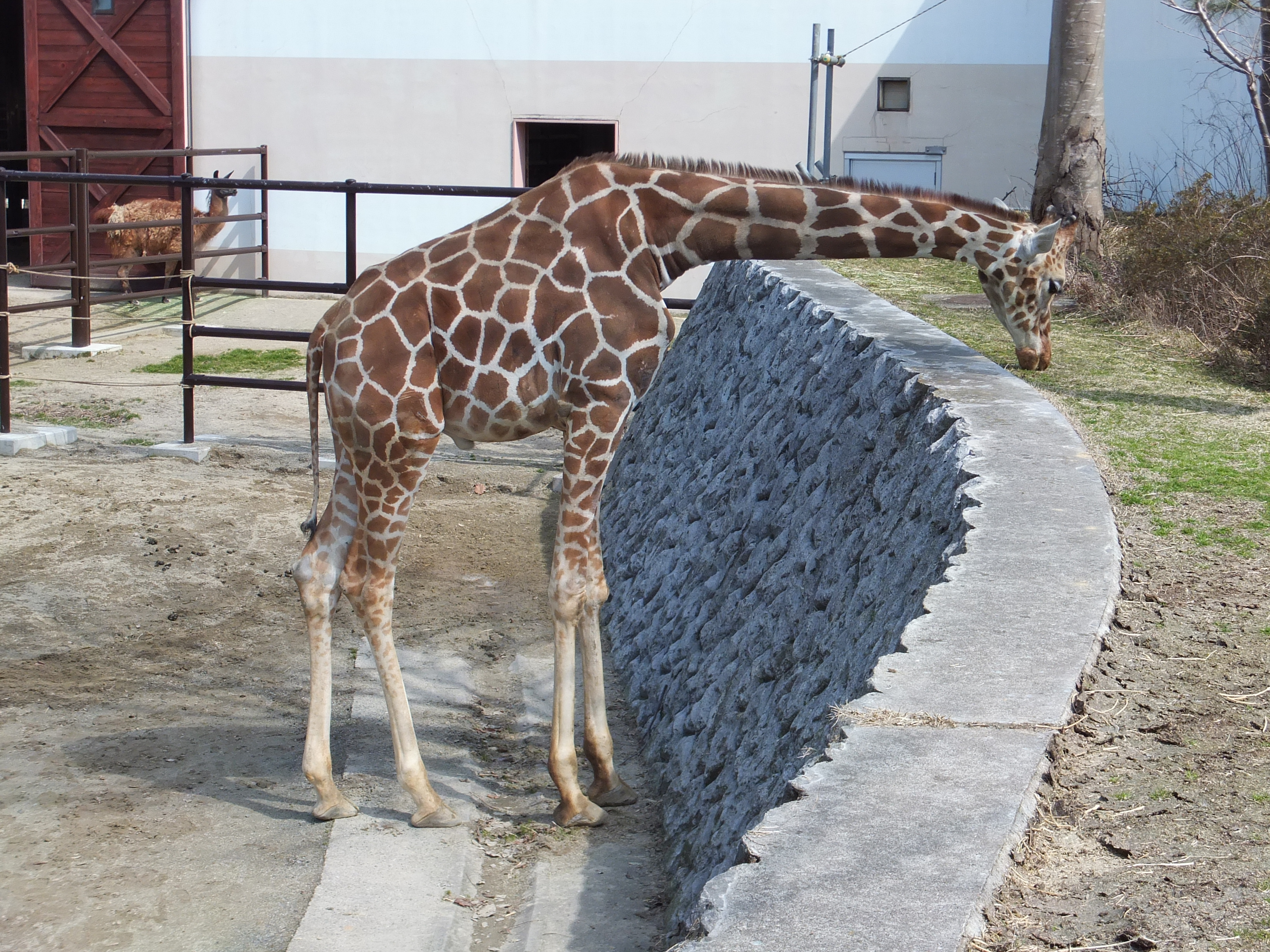
Reticulated giraffe

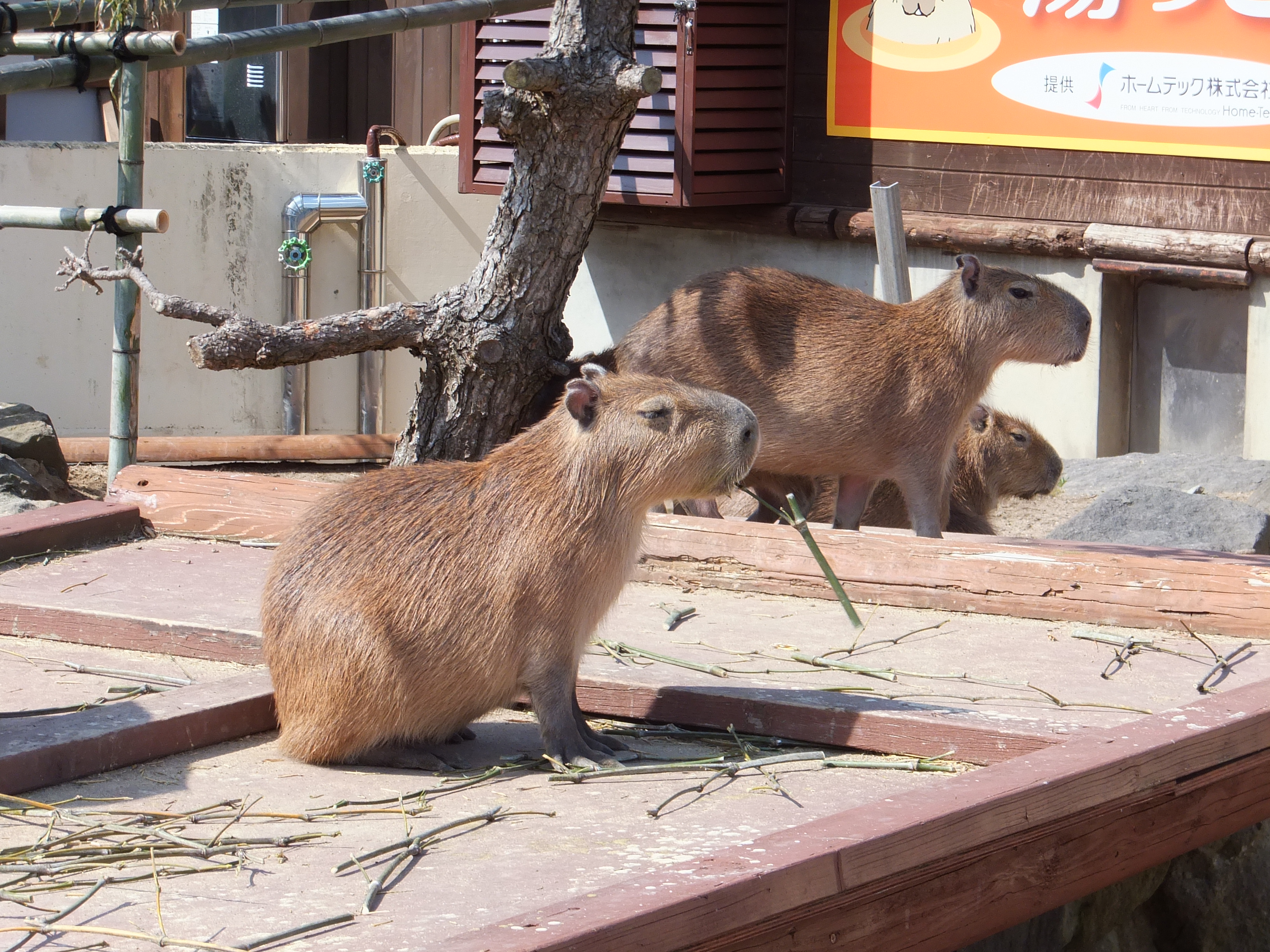
Capybara

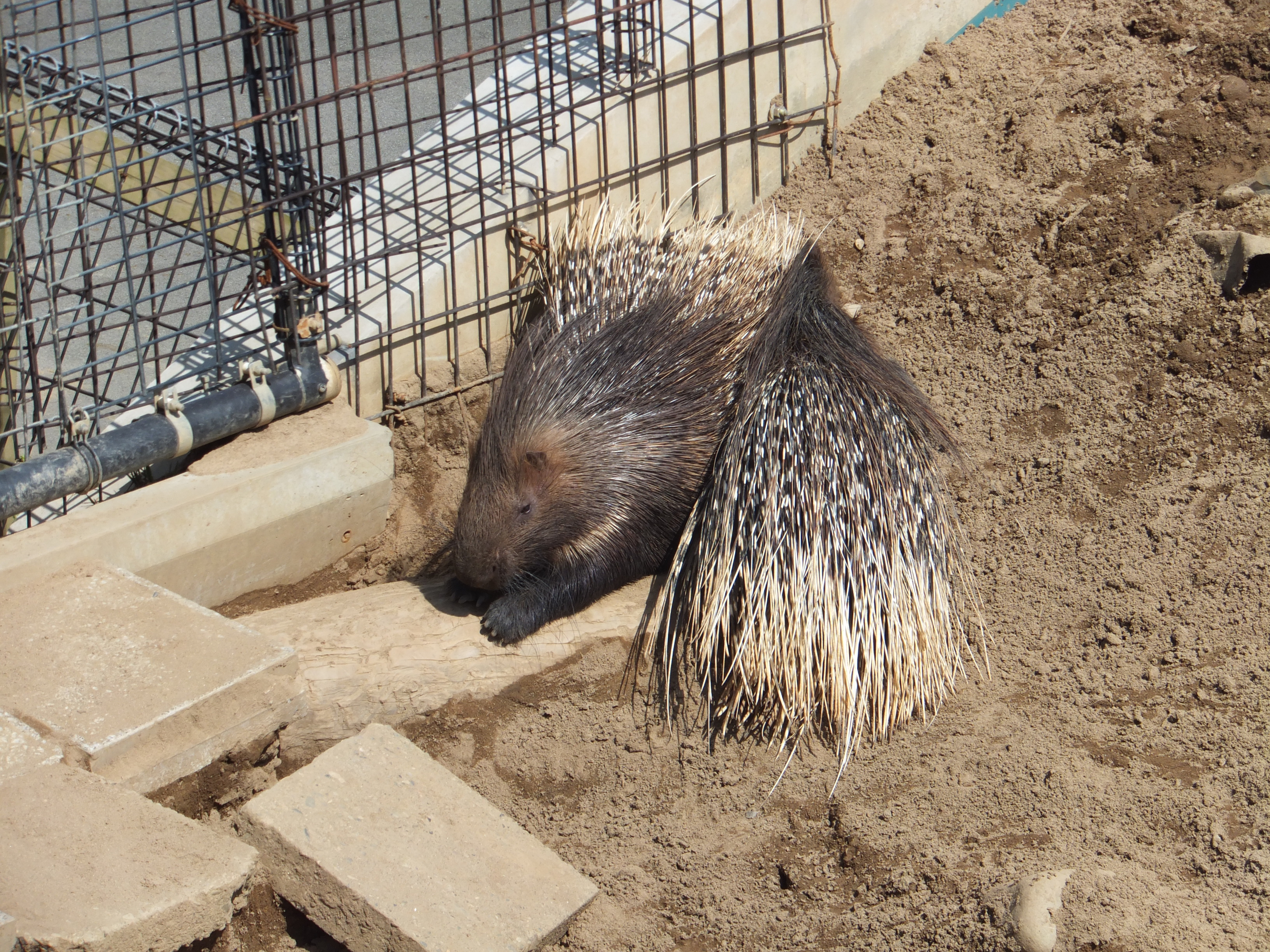
Crested porcupine

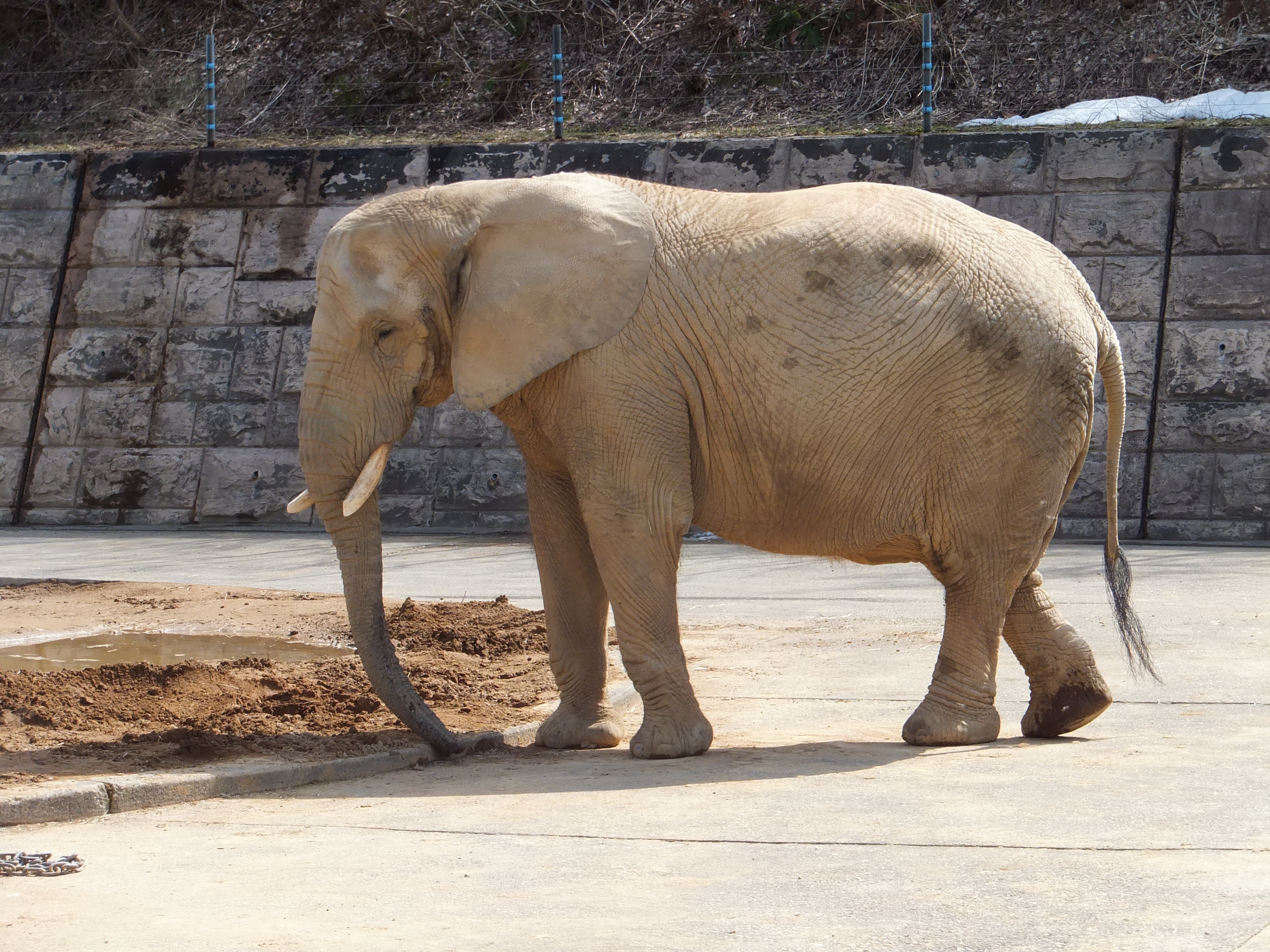
African bush elephant

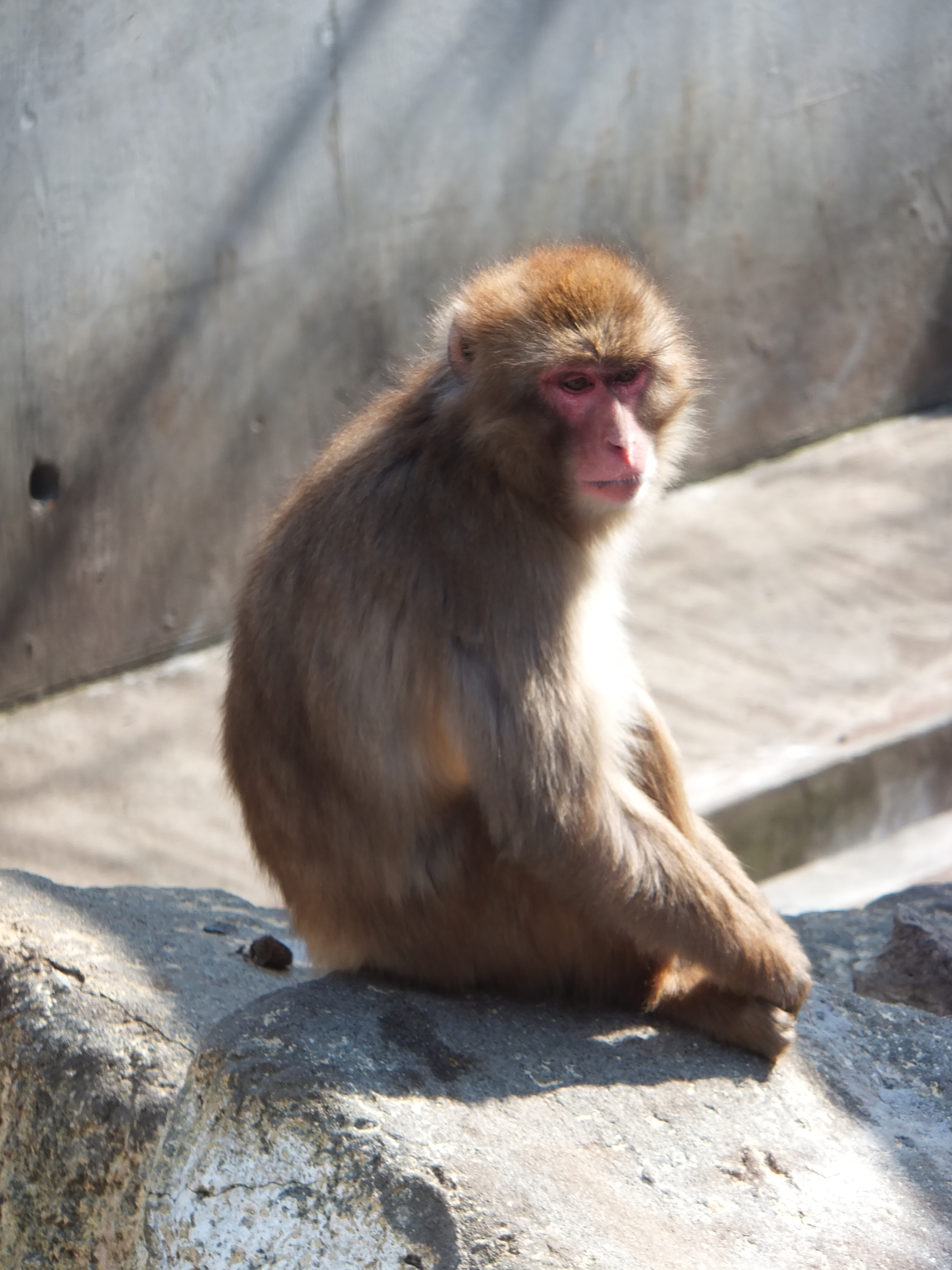
Japanese macaque

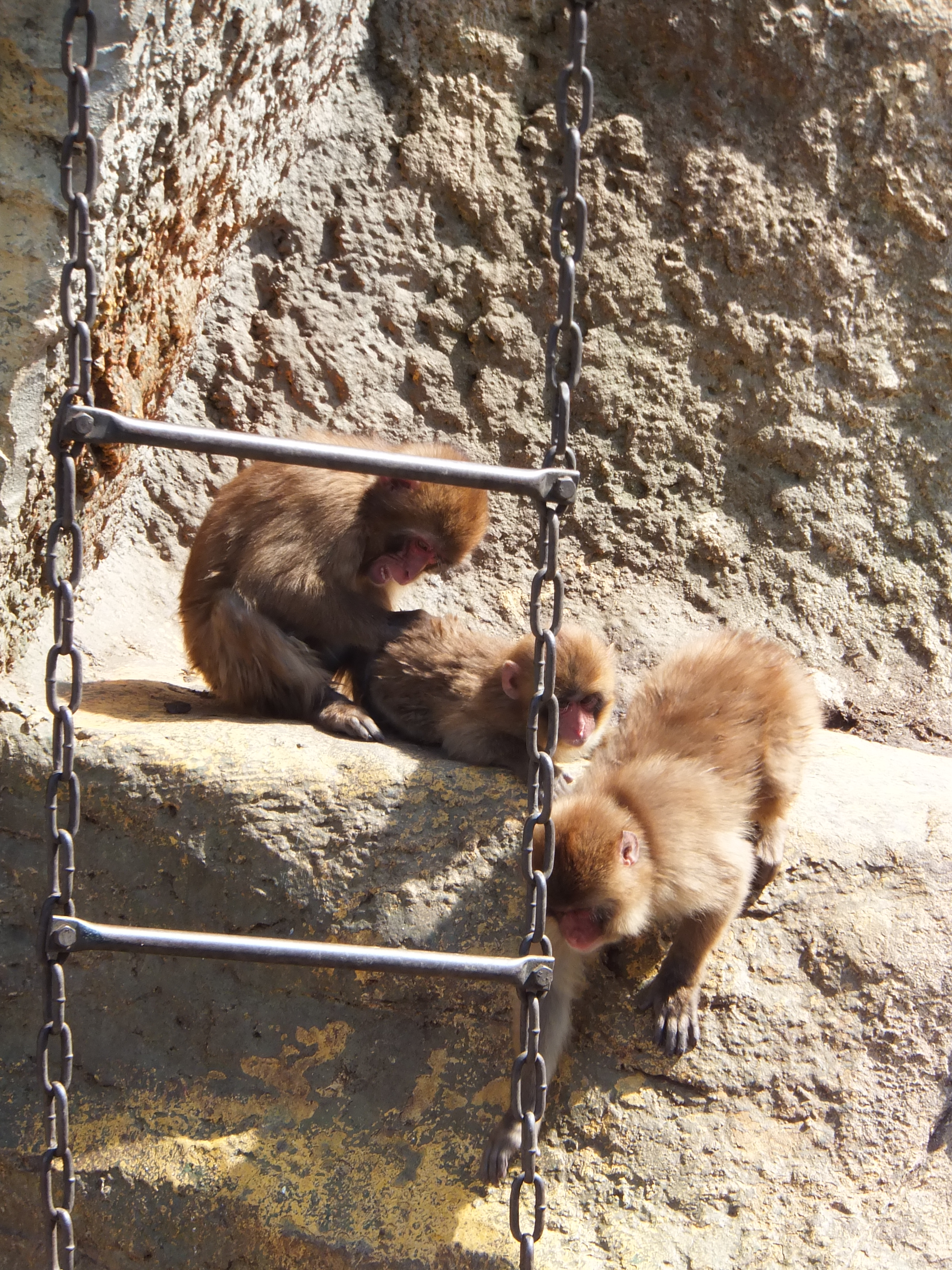

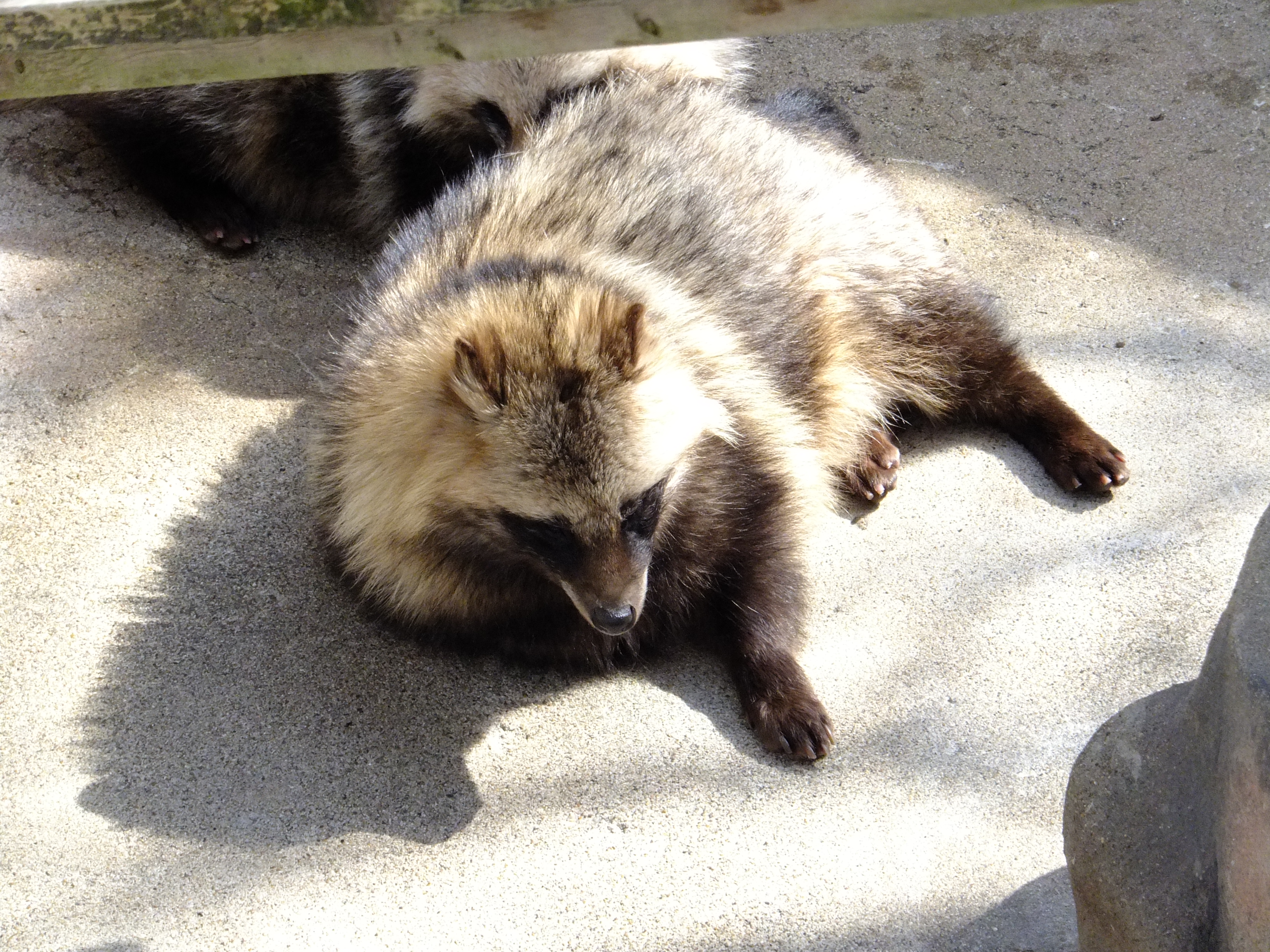
Japanese raccoon dog

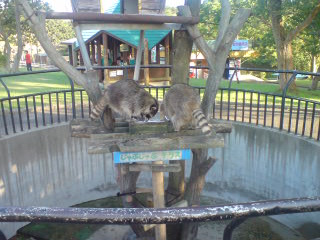
Raccoon

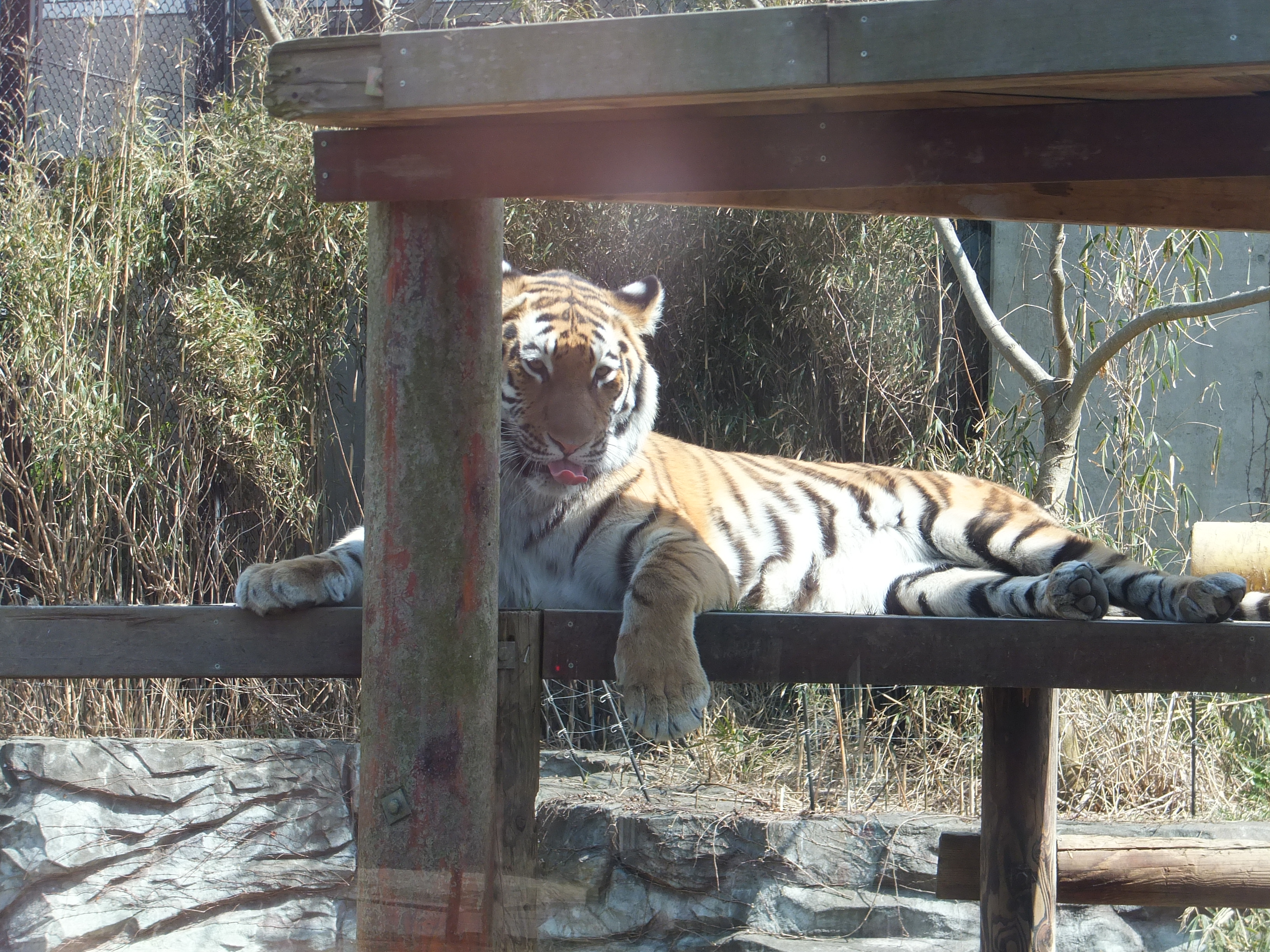
Siberian tiger

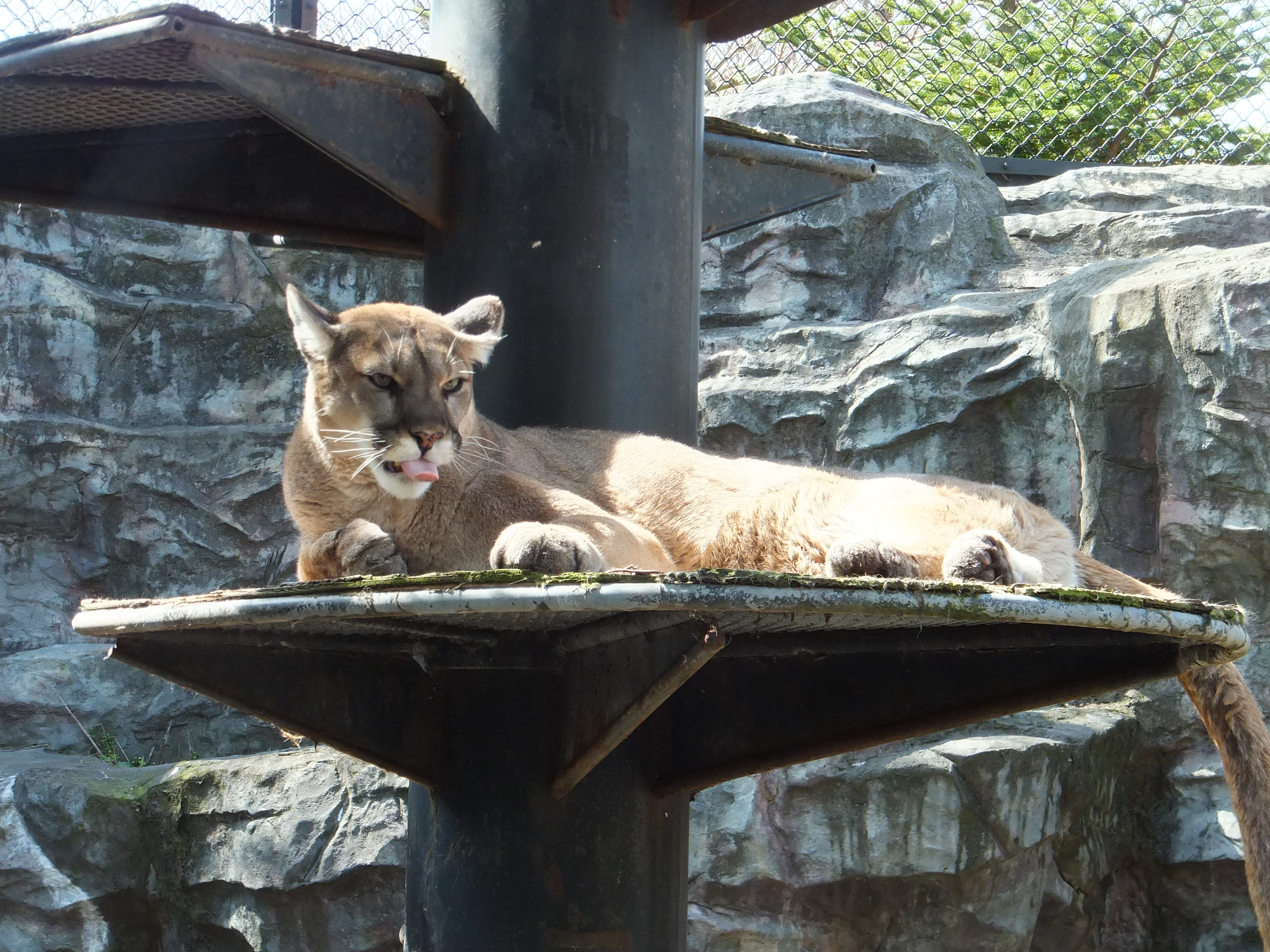
Cougar

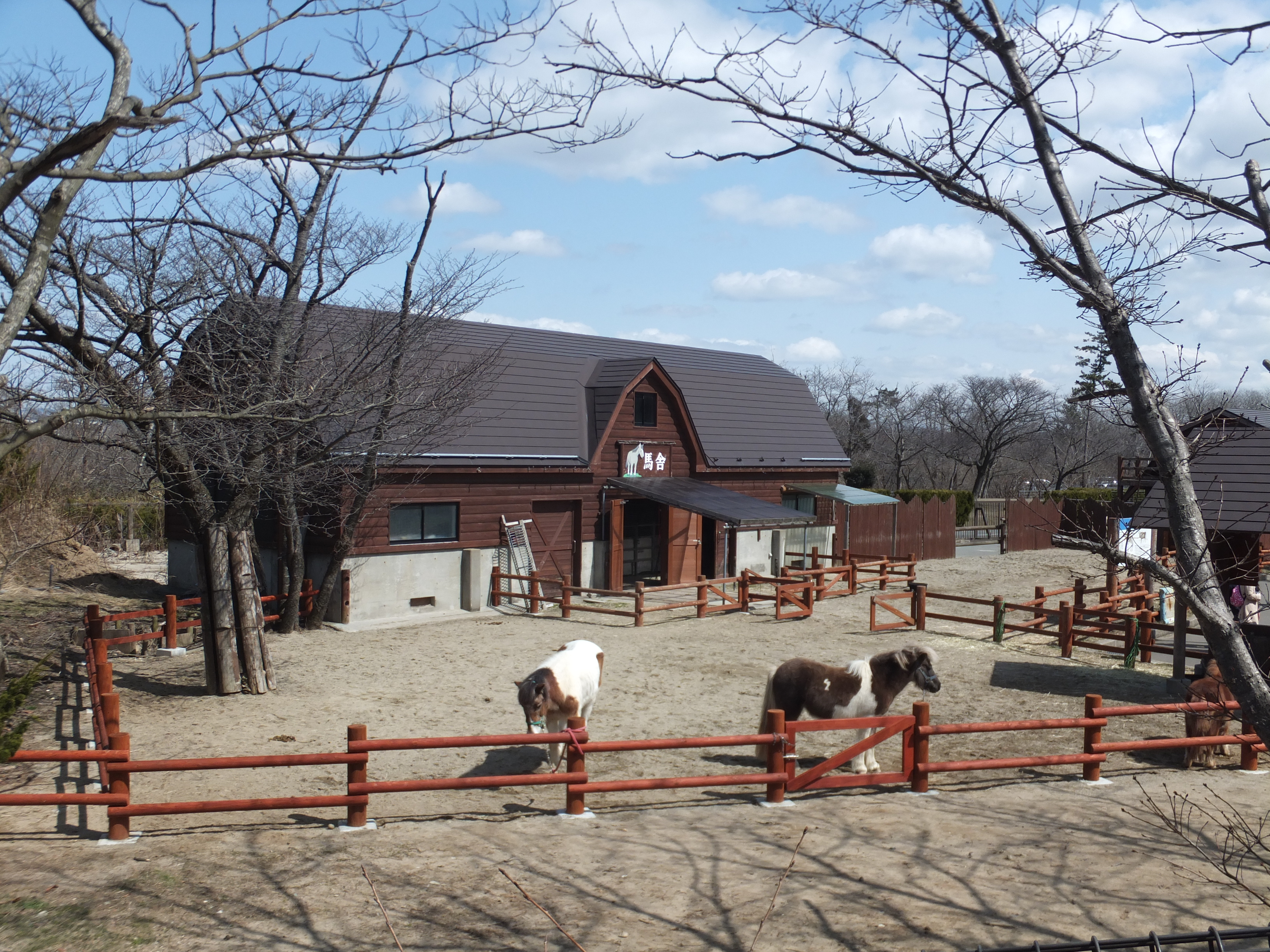

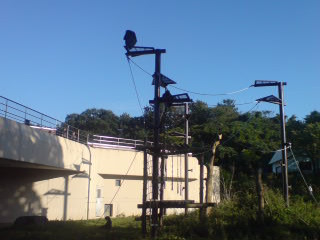
Chimpanzee

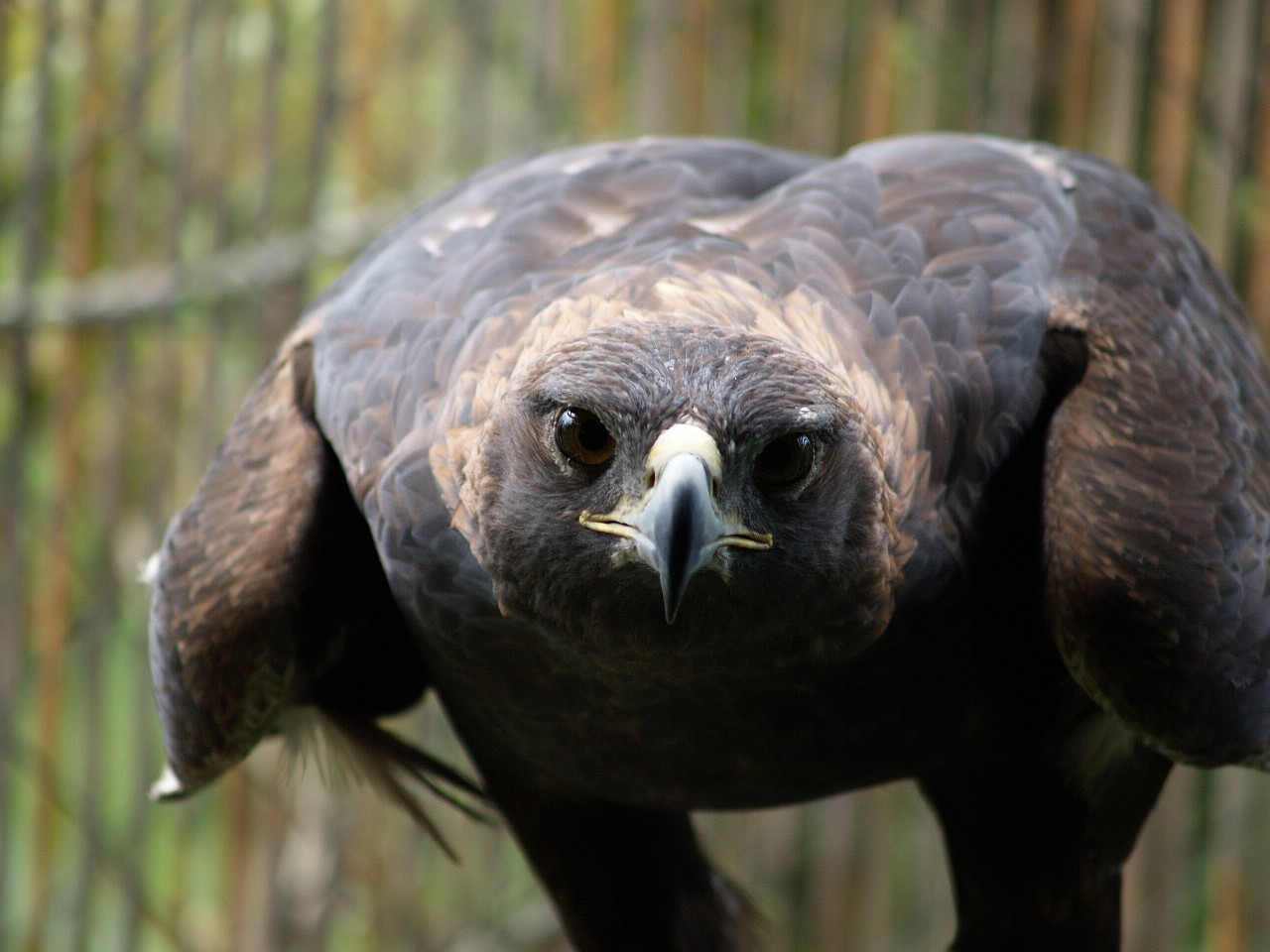
Golden eagle

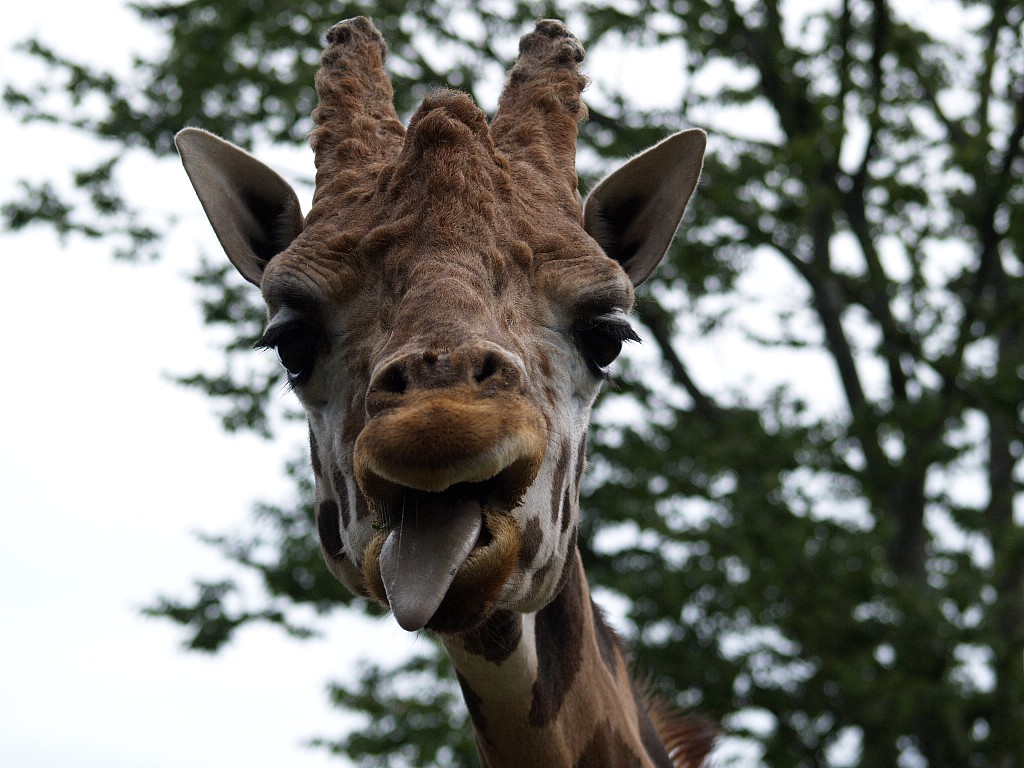

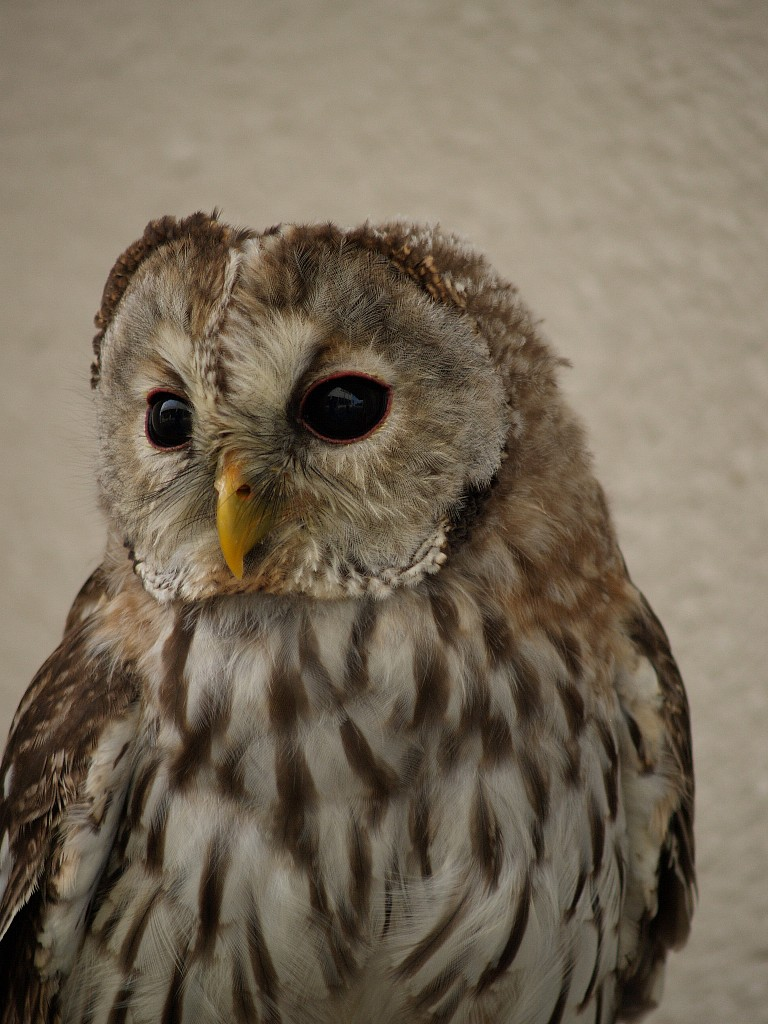
Ural owl

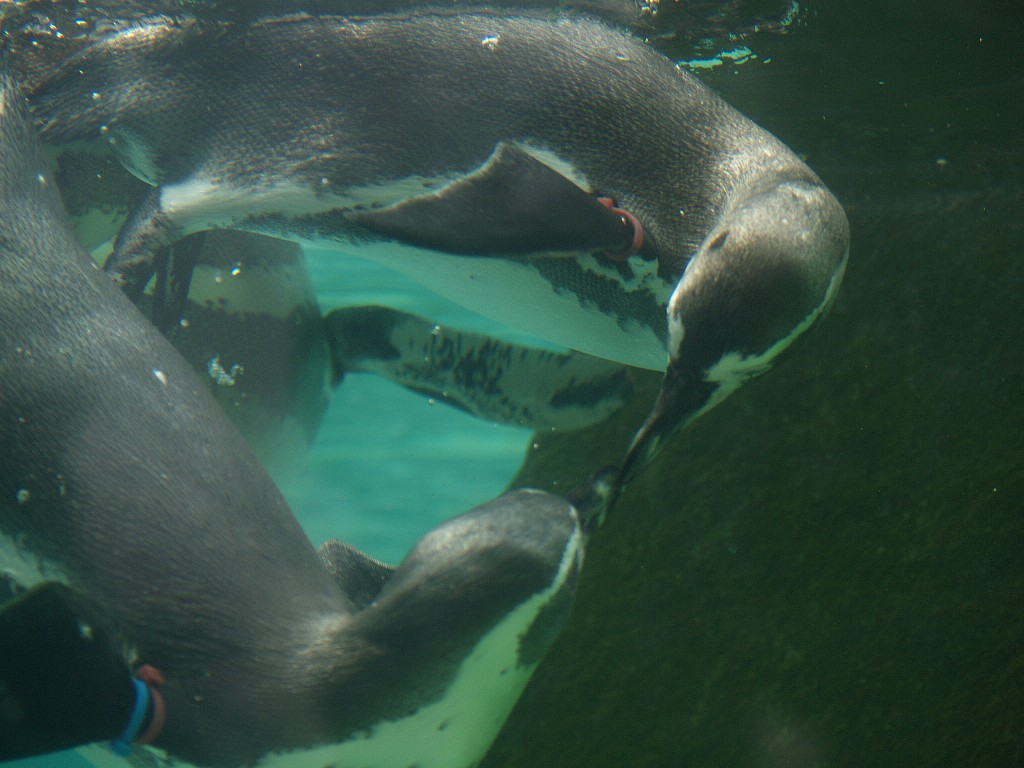
Humboldt penguin

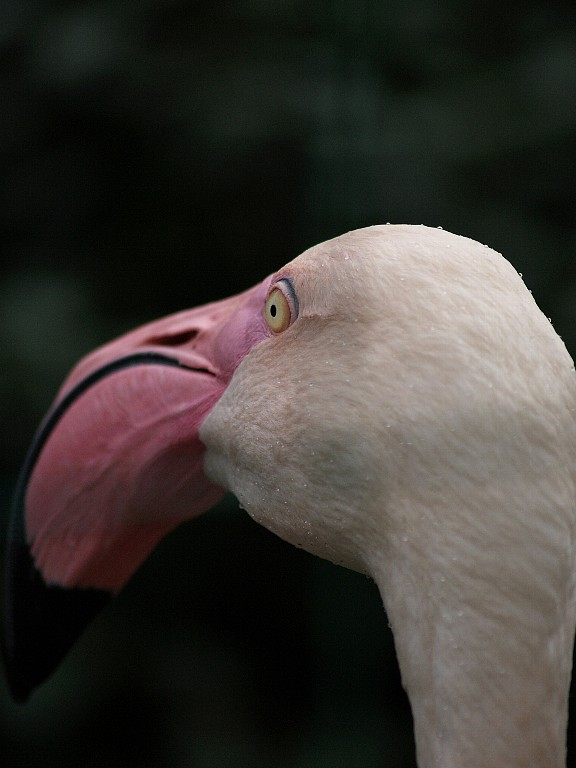
Flamingo

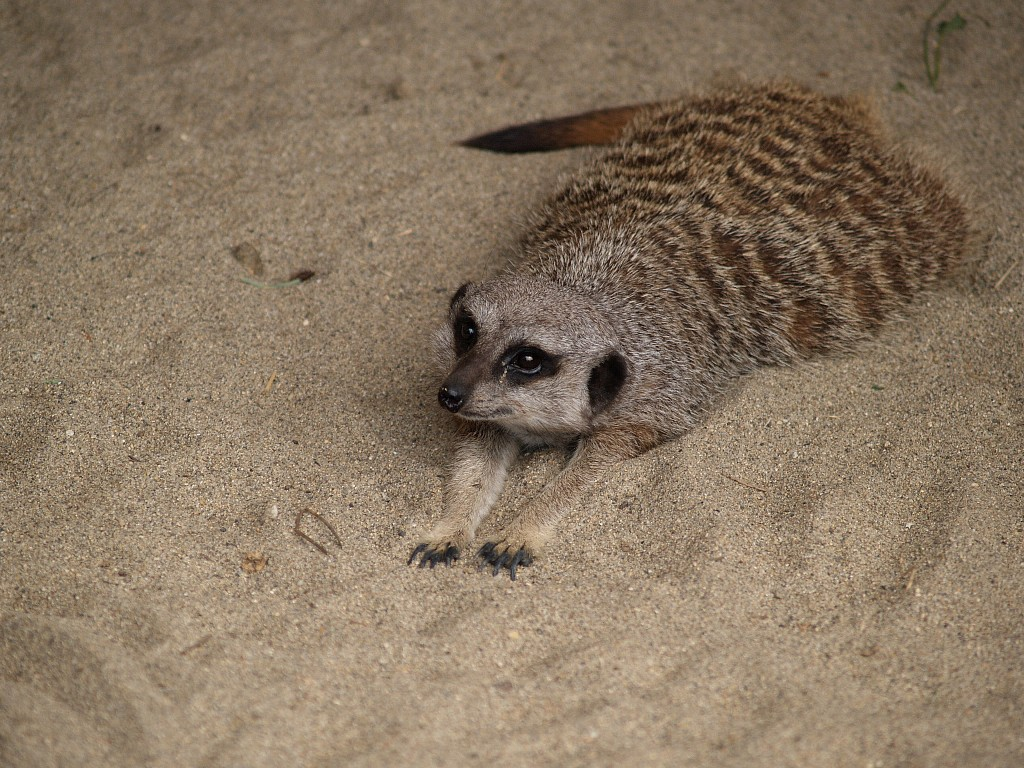
Meerkat

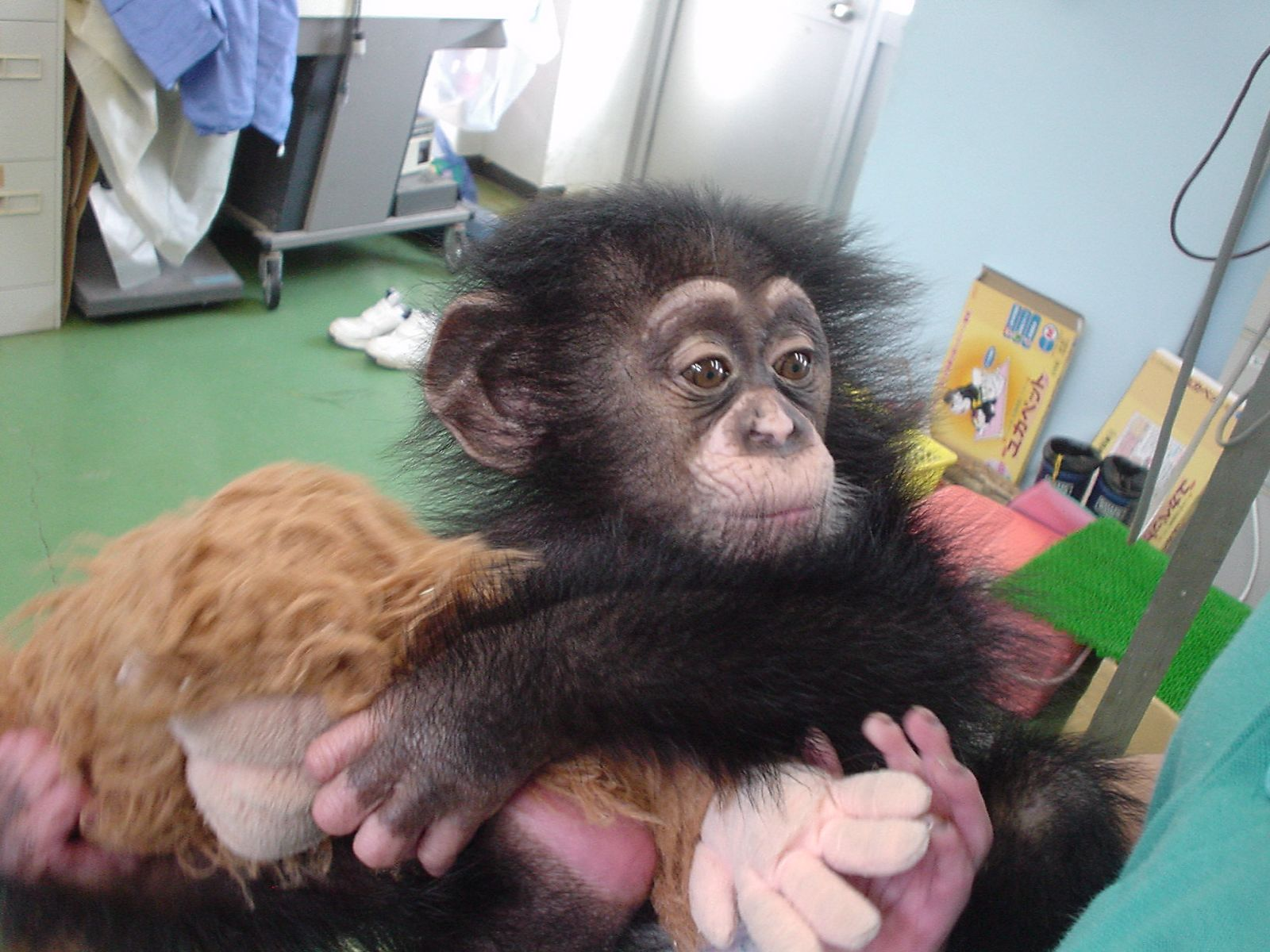

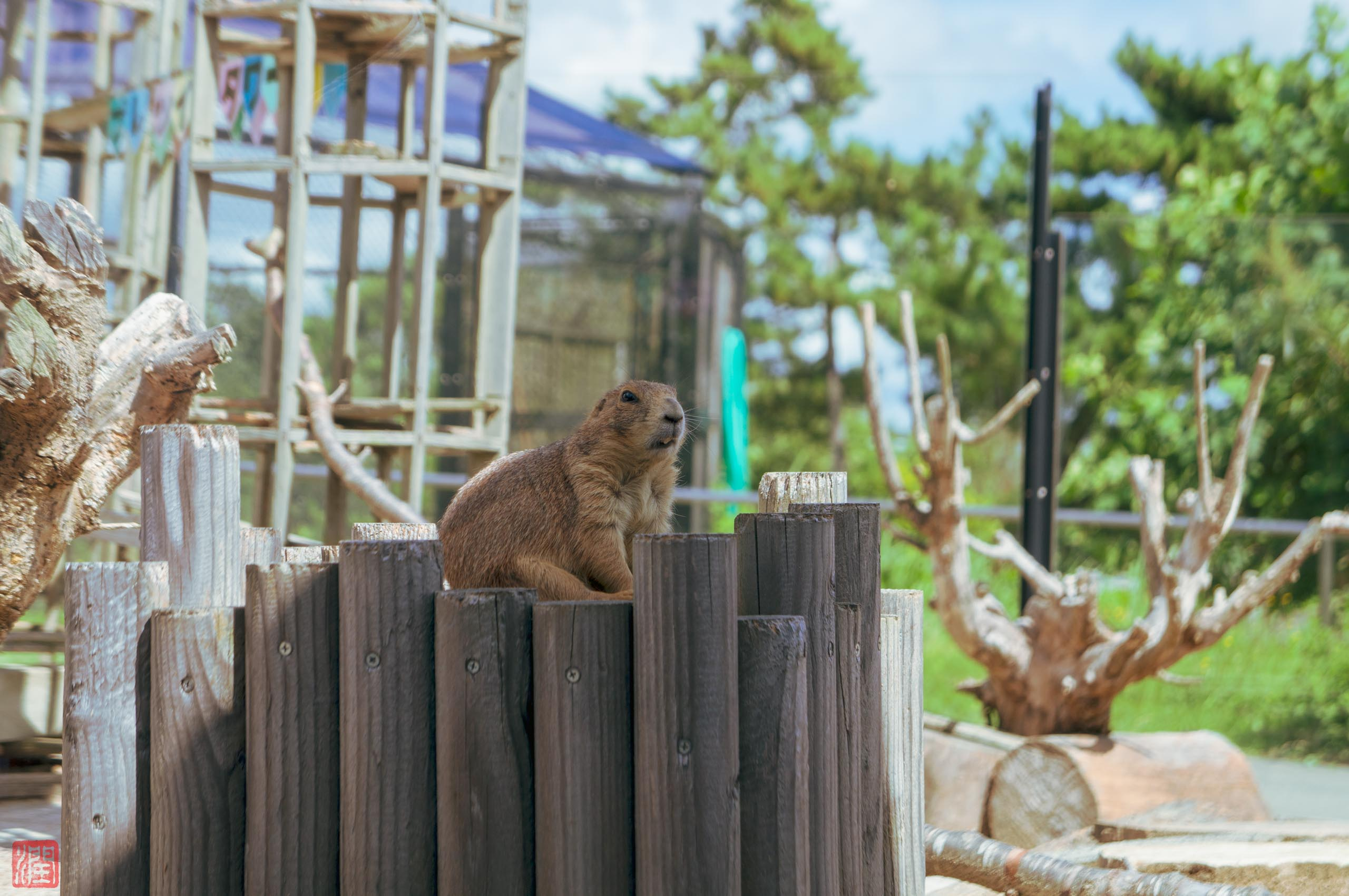

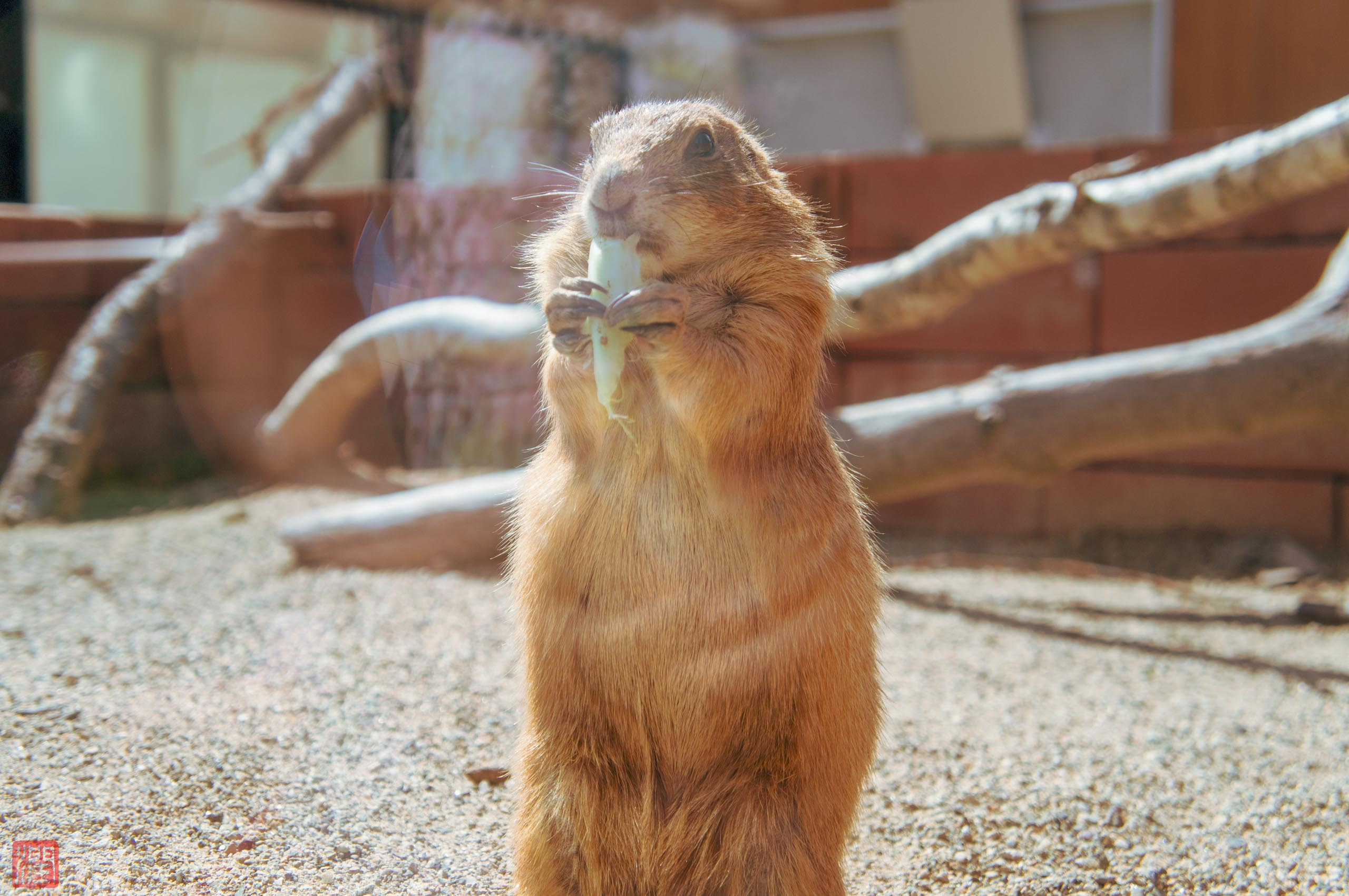

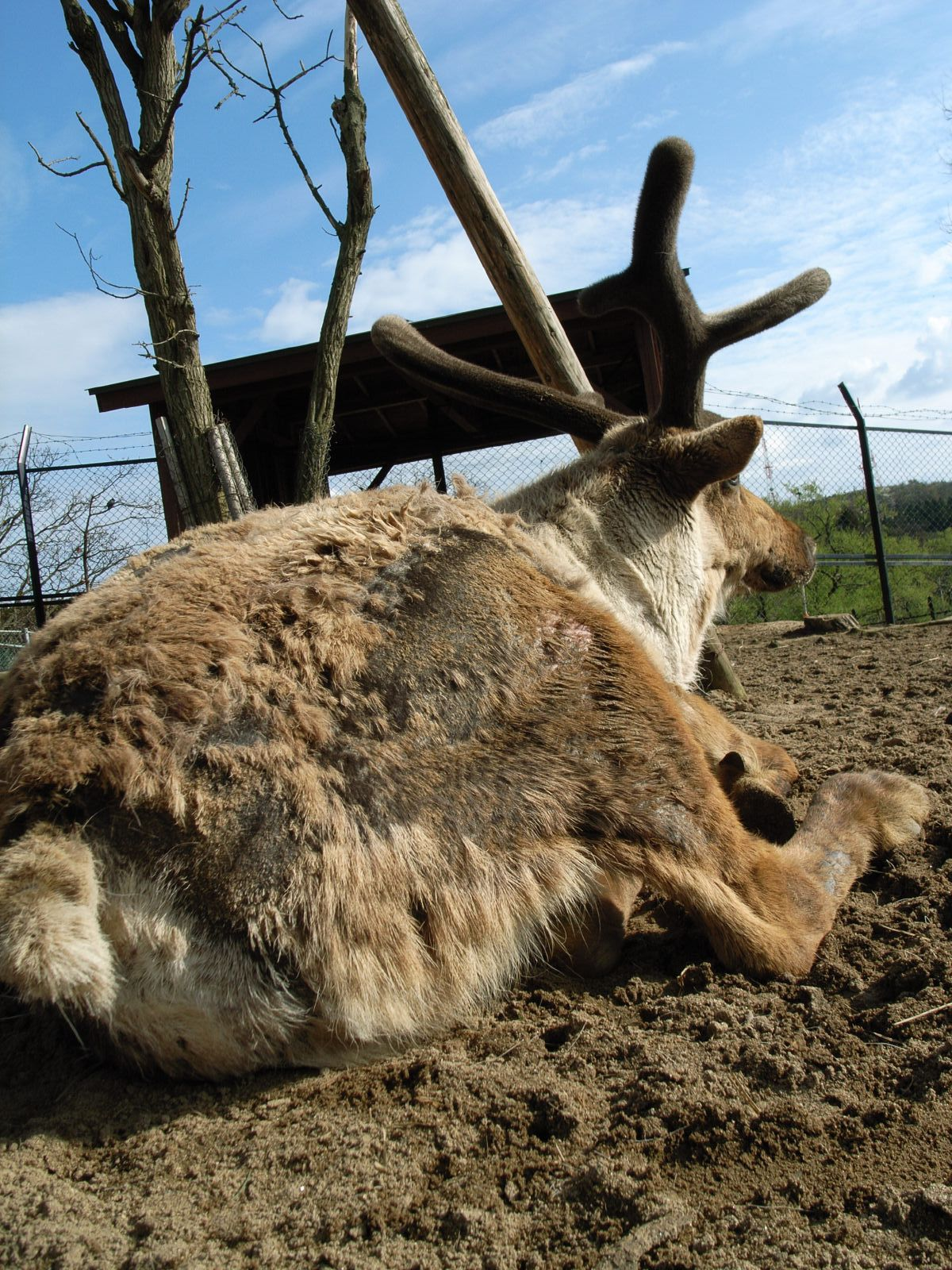
Reindeer

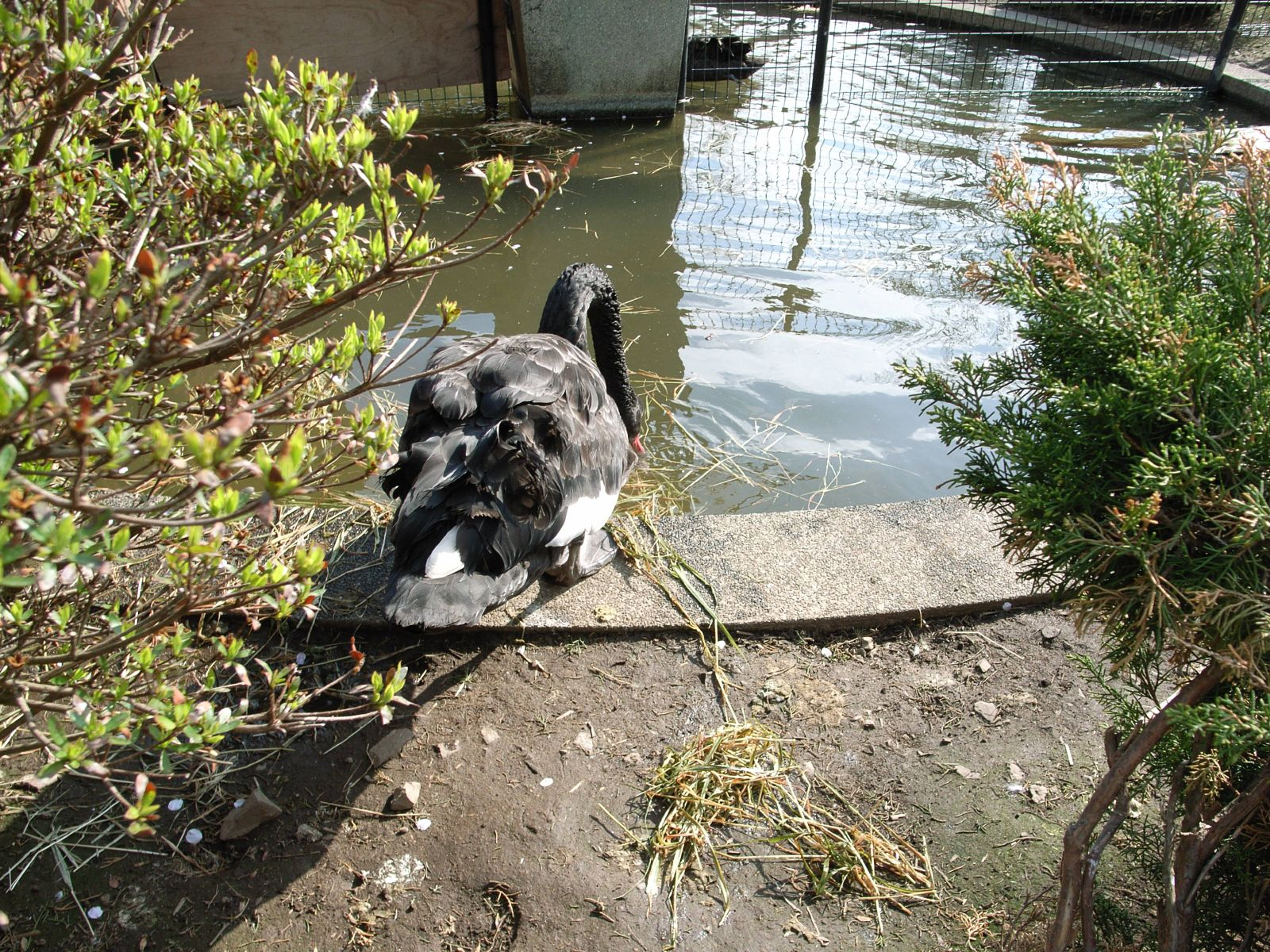
Black swan

== Akita Omoriyama Amusement Park Anipa ==
Akita Omoriyama Amusement Park Anipa 秋田大森山ゆうえんちアニパ
- Previously known as 大森山遊園地

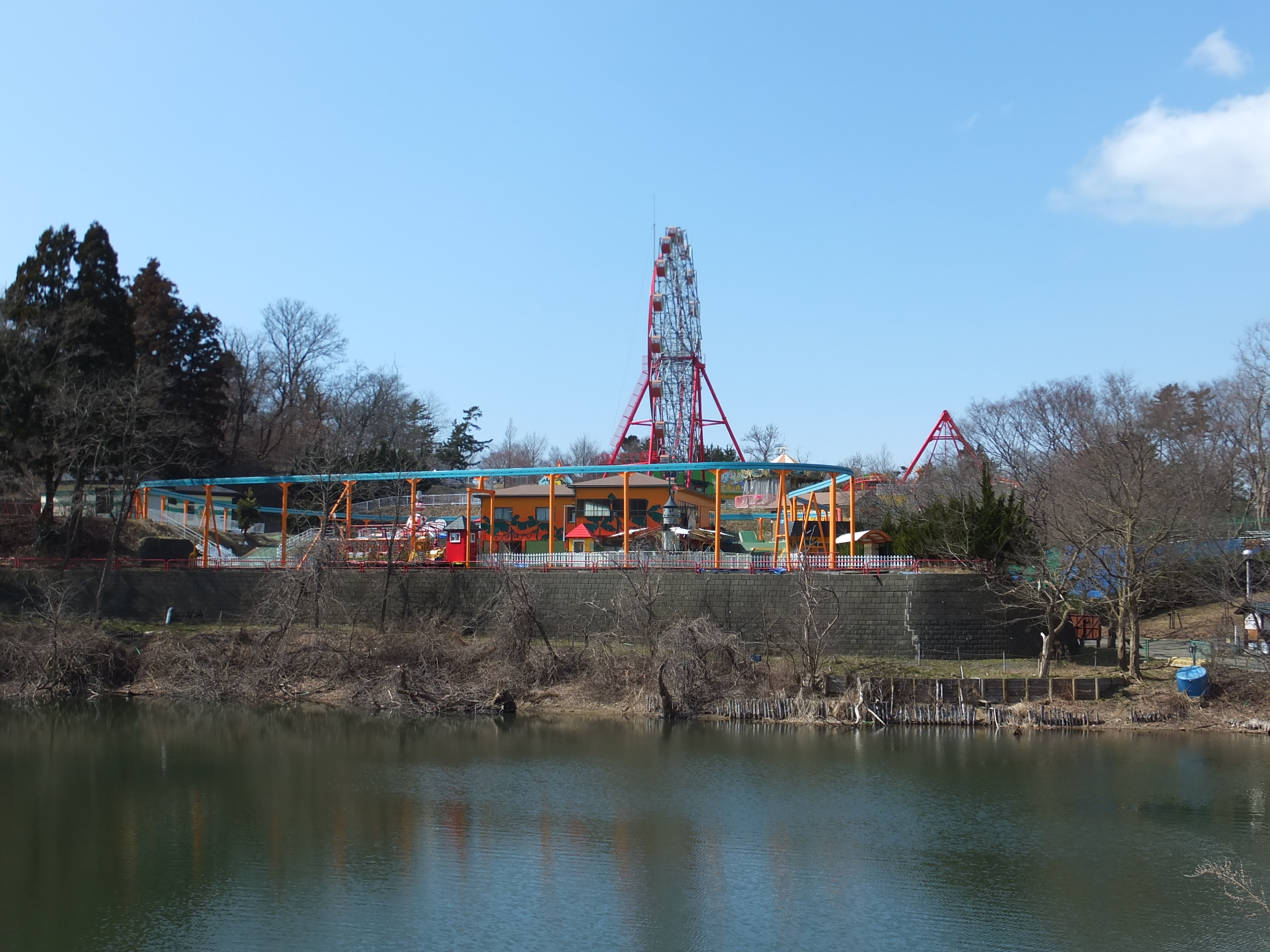
- Interactive map of Akita Omoriyama Amusement Park Anipa 秋田大森山ゆうえんちアニパ
- Location: 154 Kataba, Hamada, Akita City, Akita Prefecture, Japan
- Coordinates: 39.6712116°N 140.0727308°E
- Status: Operating
- Opened: 1979 (first); April 1, 2008 (current)
- Owner: Hoei Sangyo Co. Ltd
- Operating season: March through November

Attractions
- Total: 11 (as of 2020)
- Website: Official website

Akita Omoriyama Amusement Park Anipa (秋田大森山ゆうえんちアニパ, Akita Omoriyama Yuenchi Anipa), is an amusement park located adjacent to Omoriyama Zoo. The facilities is owned and operated by the Hoei Sangyo Co. Ltd (豊永産業) in Osaka.

=== Attractions ===
- Roller coaster of Giraffe Forest
- Firebird Kurimu Ship Swing Ride
- Jungle Circle Ferris wheel
- Mirror House of Lamb Shian
- Adventure Squad of Water Gun
- Roundabout
- Monorail of elephant Reguhon Jr.
- Jumping Stars of Rabbit Amber (Zamperla)
- Pelican Bagan and Flying Magic Bikes (Zamperla)
- Spaceship of Mouse Rasseto
- Animal Train
- Ampanman train

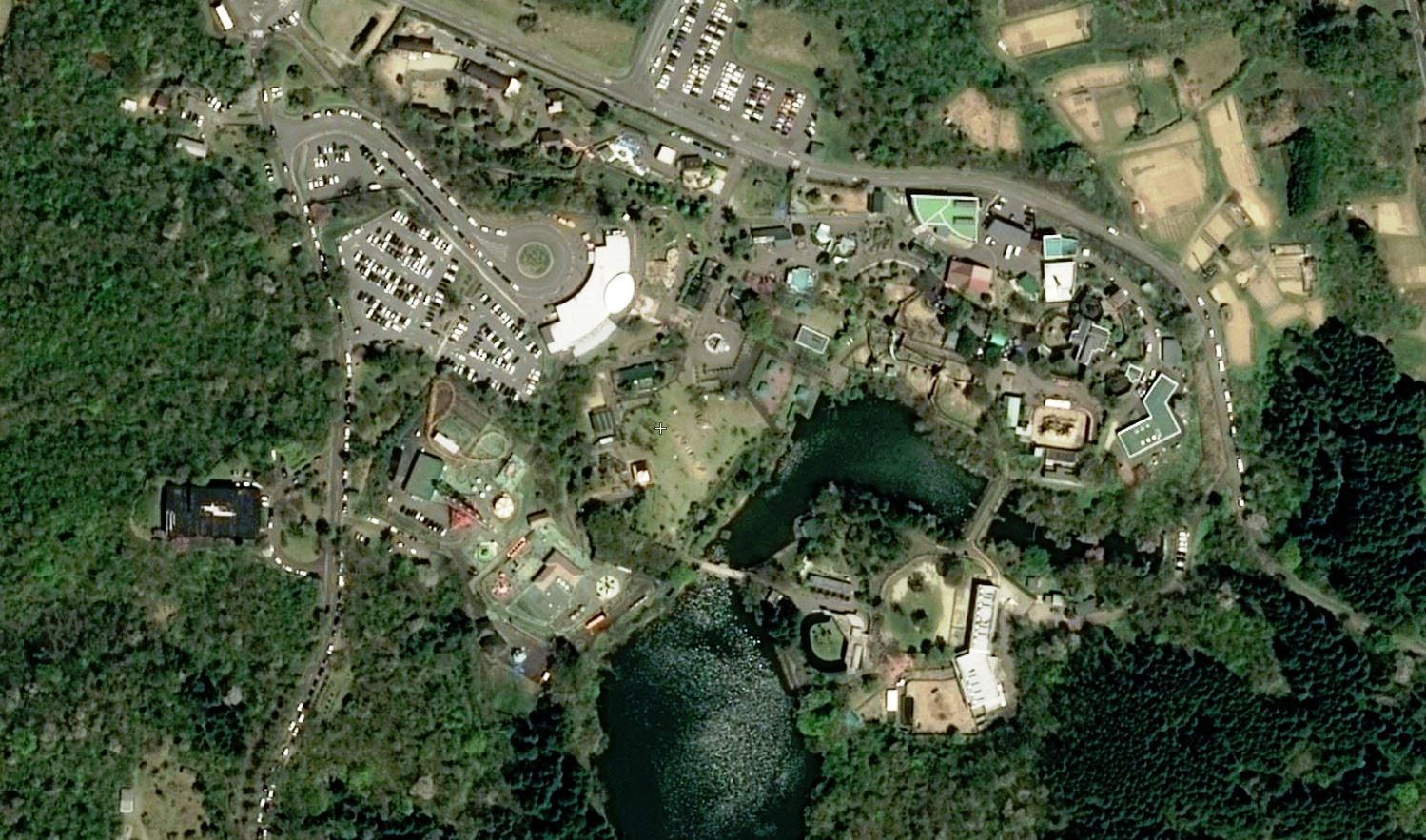
Satellite view

== Parking lot ==
It can hold 430 cars and vehicles.
