= List of bus operating companies in Japan =

List of bus operating companies in Japan lists Japanese bus operators. The list includes companies operating now. Operators are listed from north to south by prefecture of its headquarters.

The list includes transit buses, highway buses, or sightseeing buses. Operators of lines not open to passers-by, such as charter only companies, or schools operating school buses are not listed.

The list also excludes community bus (コミュニティバス, komyunitī basu) lines. It refers to feeder bus transits with usually smaller vehicles, operated by municipalities. See ja:日本のコミュニティバス一覧 for the list. "Normal" municipal bus transits (kōei basu (公営バス), such as Toei Bus of Tōkyō) are listed here.

Trolleybuses and guided buses are listed in the List of railway companies in Japan, as they are classified as railway in the country.

For the operators in Kantō and Kansai, accepted fare collection cards are indicated as below. Other operators may accept different cards.

^{C} : Operators currently accepting magnetic Common Bus Card.
^{PA} : Operators currently accepting smart card PASMO.
^{S} : Operators currently accepting magnetic Surutto Kansai.
^{Pi} : Operators currently accepting smart card PiTaPa.

English names might be tentative.

== Hokkaidō ==
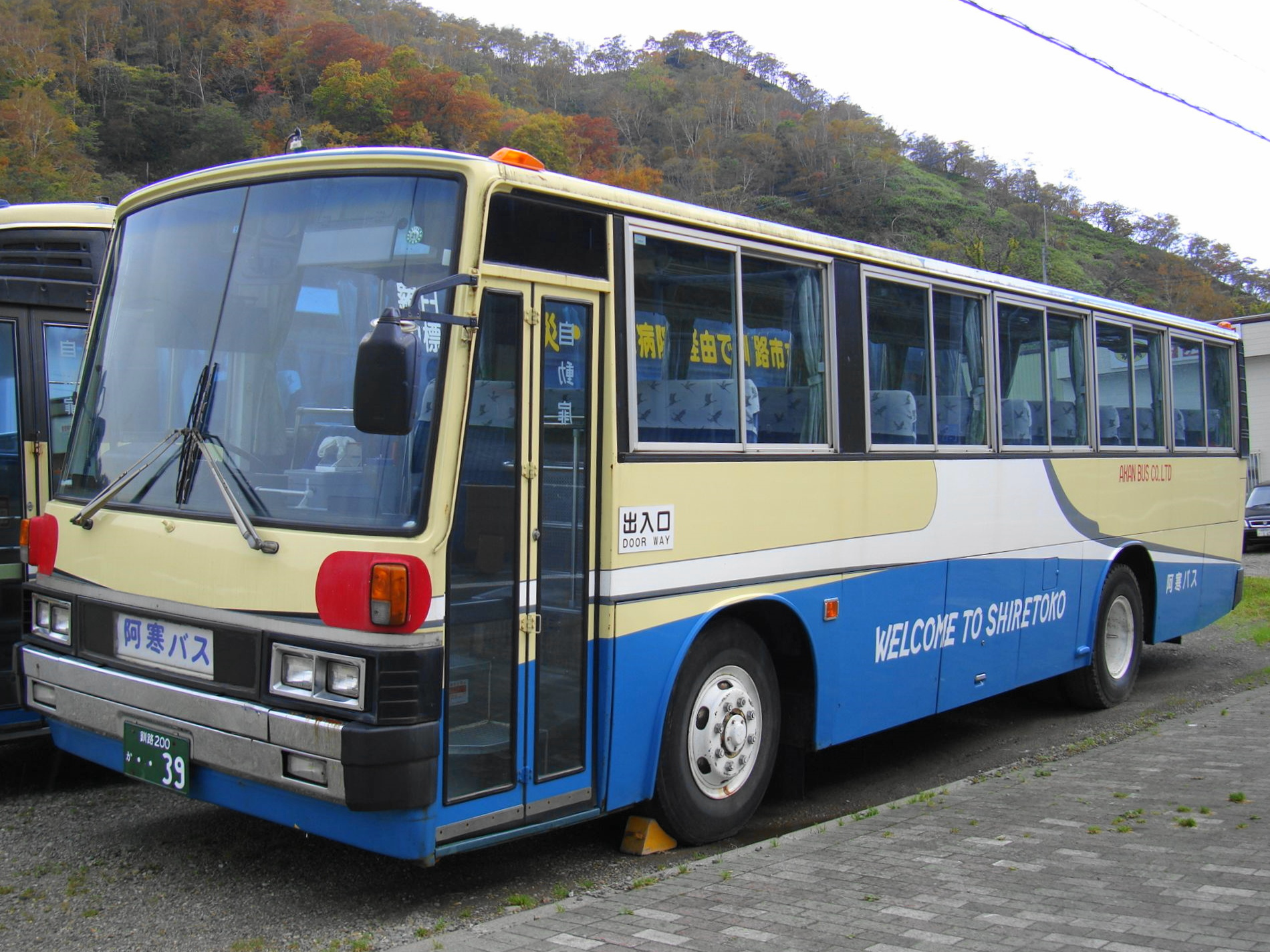
Akan Bus at Rausu.

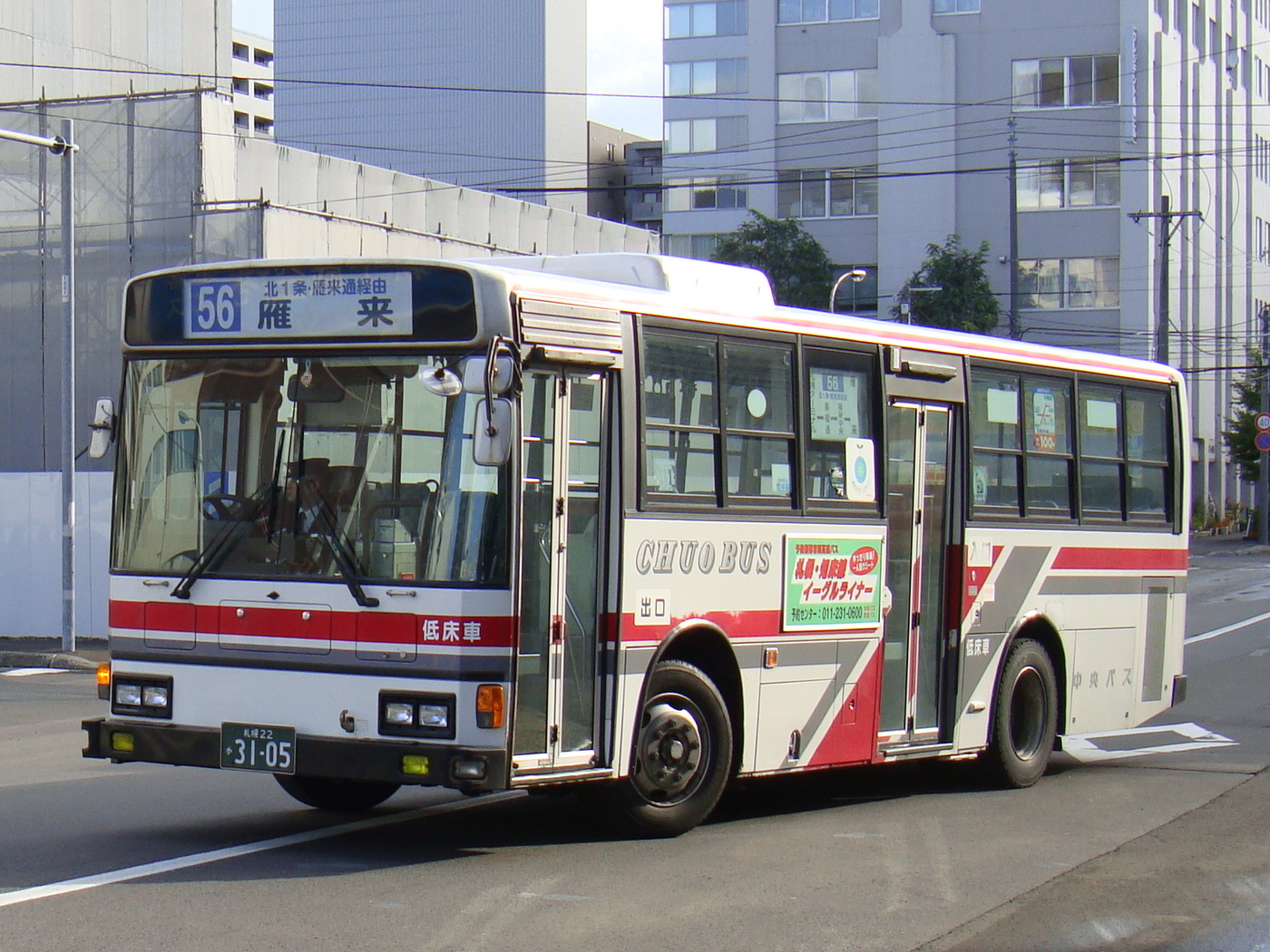
Hokkaidō Chūō Bus at Sapporo.

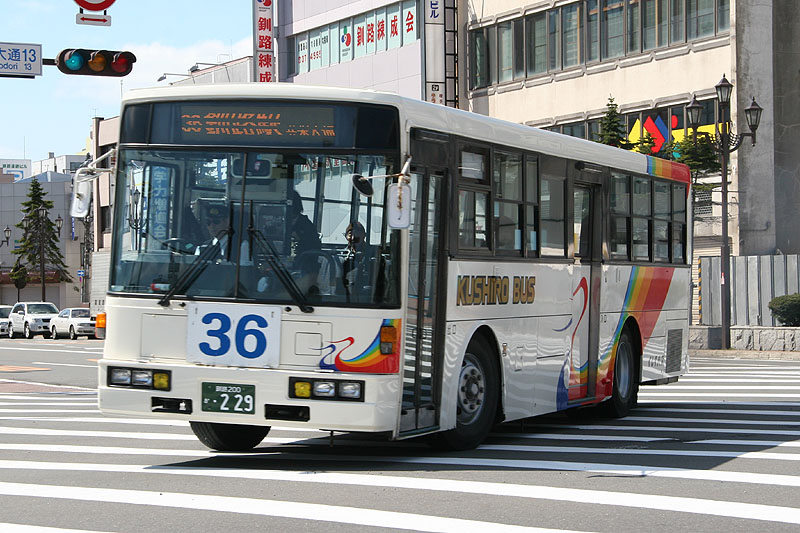
Kushiro Bus at Kushiro Station.

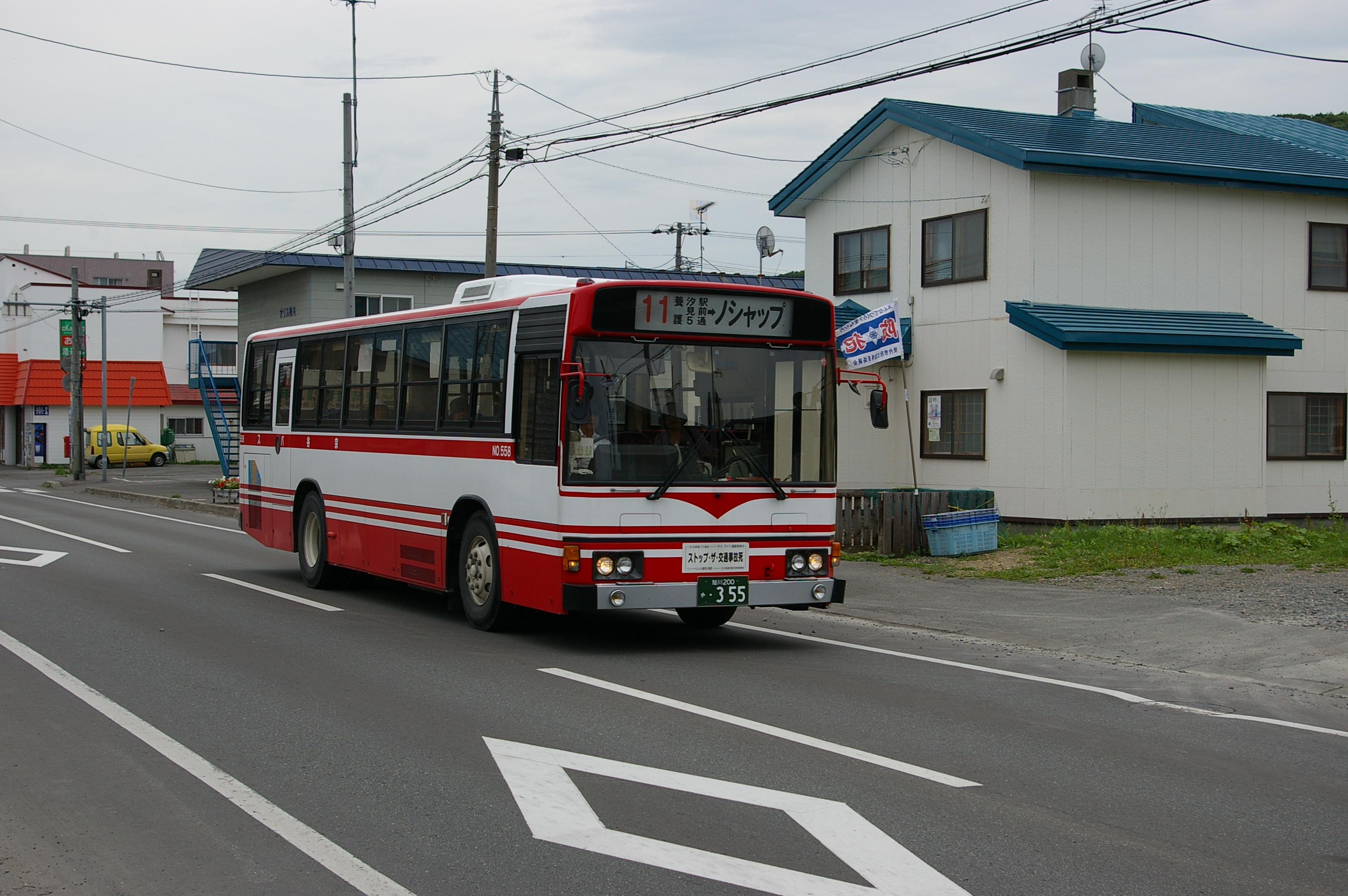
Sōya Bus at Wakkanai, the northernmost bus operator in Japan.

- Abashiri Bus 網走バス
- Abashiri Kankō Kōtsū 網走観光交通
- Akan Bus 阿寒バス
- Asahikawa Denki Kidō 旭川電気軌道
- Atsuma Bus あつまバス
- Chitose Sōgo Kankō Bus 千歳相互観光バス
- Dōhoku Bus 道北バス
- Dōnan Bus 道南バス
- Engan Bus 沿岸バス
- Furano Bus ふらのバス
- Hakodate Bus 函館バス
- Hakodate Taxi (Hakodate Teisan Bus) 函館タクシー (函館帝産バス)
- Hiyama Kankō Bus 檜山観光バス
- Hokkaido Chuo Bus 北海道中央バス
  - Niseko Bus ニセコバス
  - Sapporo Daiichi Kankō Bus 札幌第一観光バス
  - Sorachi Chūō Bus 空知中央バス
- Hokkaidō Kitami Bus 北海道北見バス
- Hokkaidō Takushoku Bus 北海道拓殖バス
- Hokumon Bus 北紋バス
- Hokuto Kōtsū 北都交通
- JR Group JRグループ
  - JR Hokkaidō Bus ジェイ・アール北海道バス
- Kushiro Bus くしろバス
- Meishi Bus 名士バス
- Nemuro Kōtsū 根室交通
- Okushiri Kankō 奥尻観光
- Sapporo Bankei 札幌ばんけい
- Shari Bus 斜里バス
- Shibetsu Kidō 士別軌道
- Sōya Bus 宗谷バス

The northernmost operator.

- Tentetsu Bus てんてつバス
- Tokachi Bus 十勝バス
- Tōkyū Group 東急グループ
  - Jōtetsu じょうてつ
- Yūbari Railway (Yūtetsu Bus) 夕張鉄道 (夕鉄バス)

== Tōhoku region ==
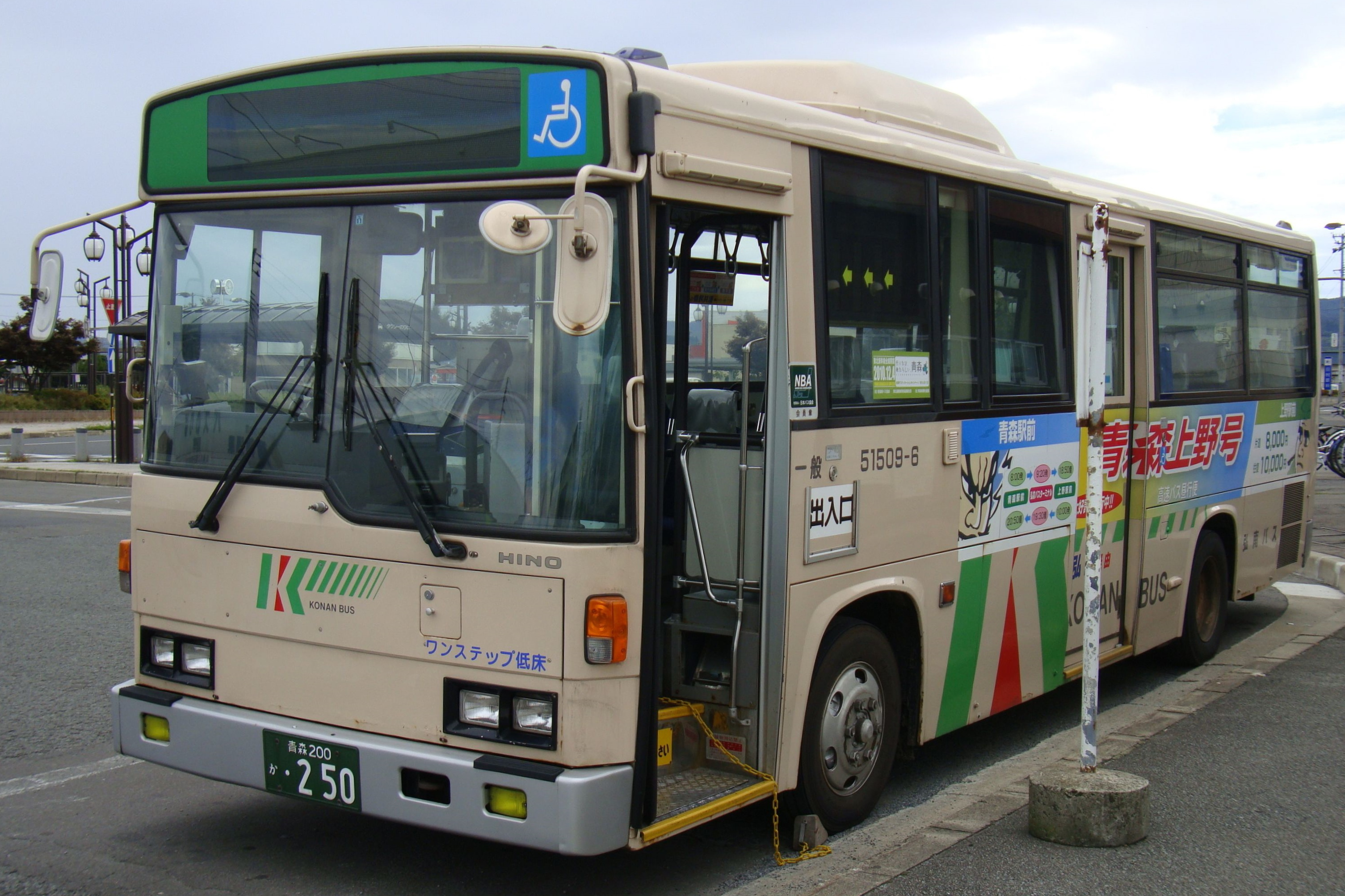
Kōnan Bus at Kuroishi.

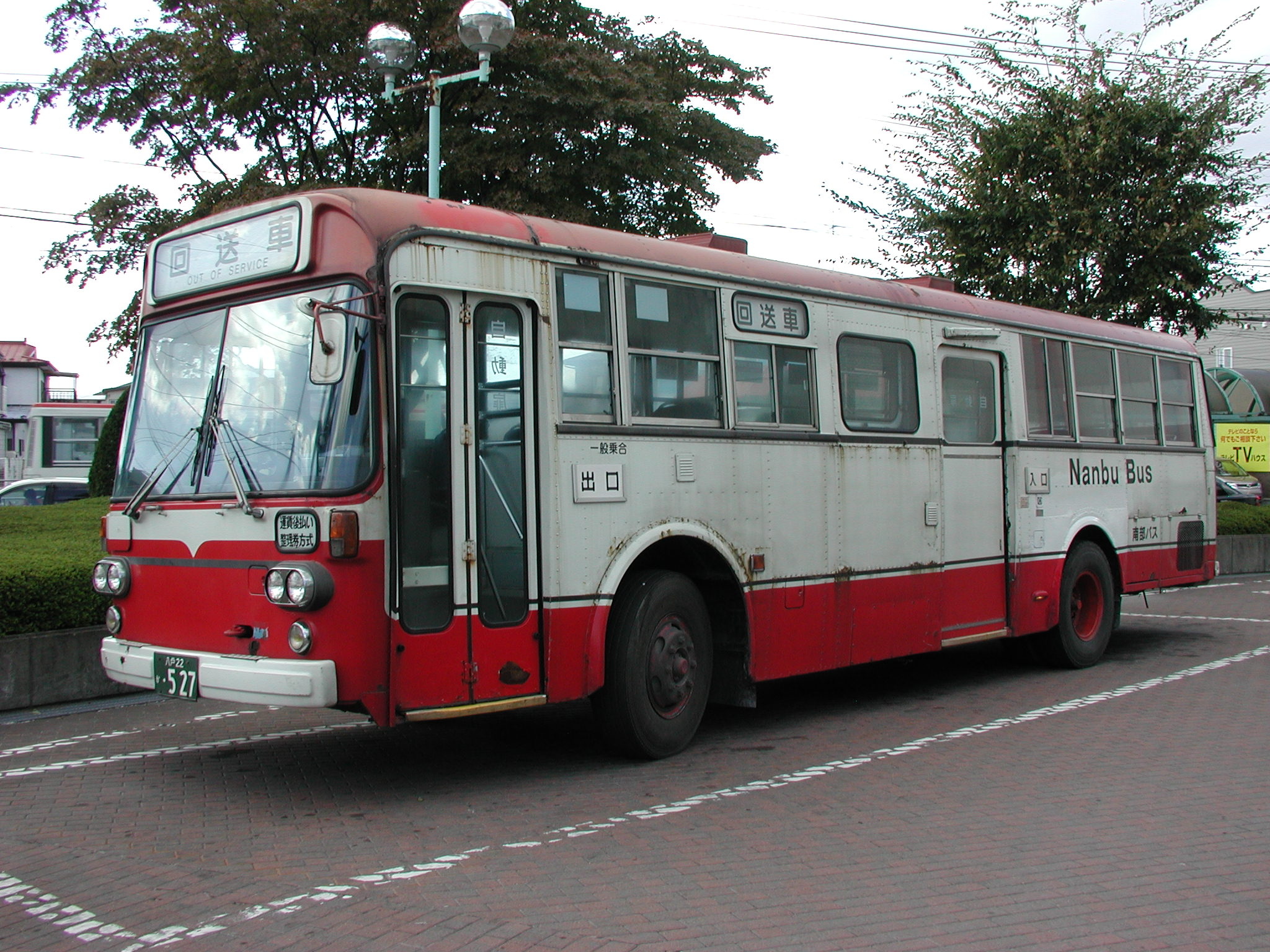
An Nanbu Bus Isuzu C.

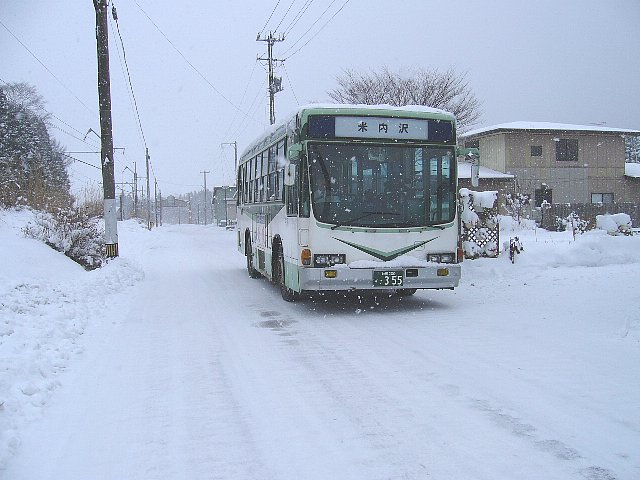
Shūhoku Bus vehicle, Ōdate.

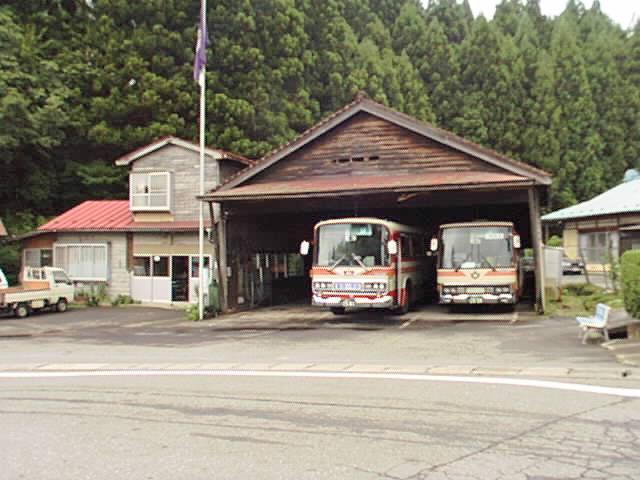
Omoe Bus Terminal, Iwate Kenpoku Bus.

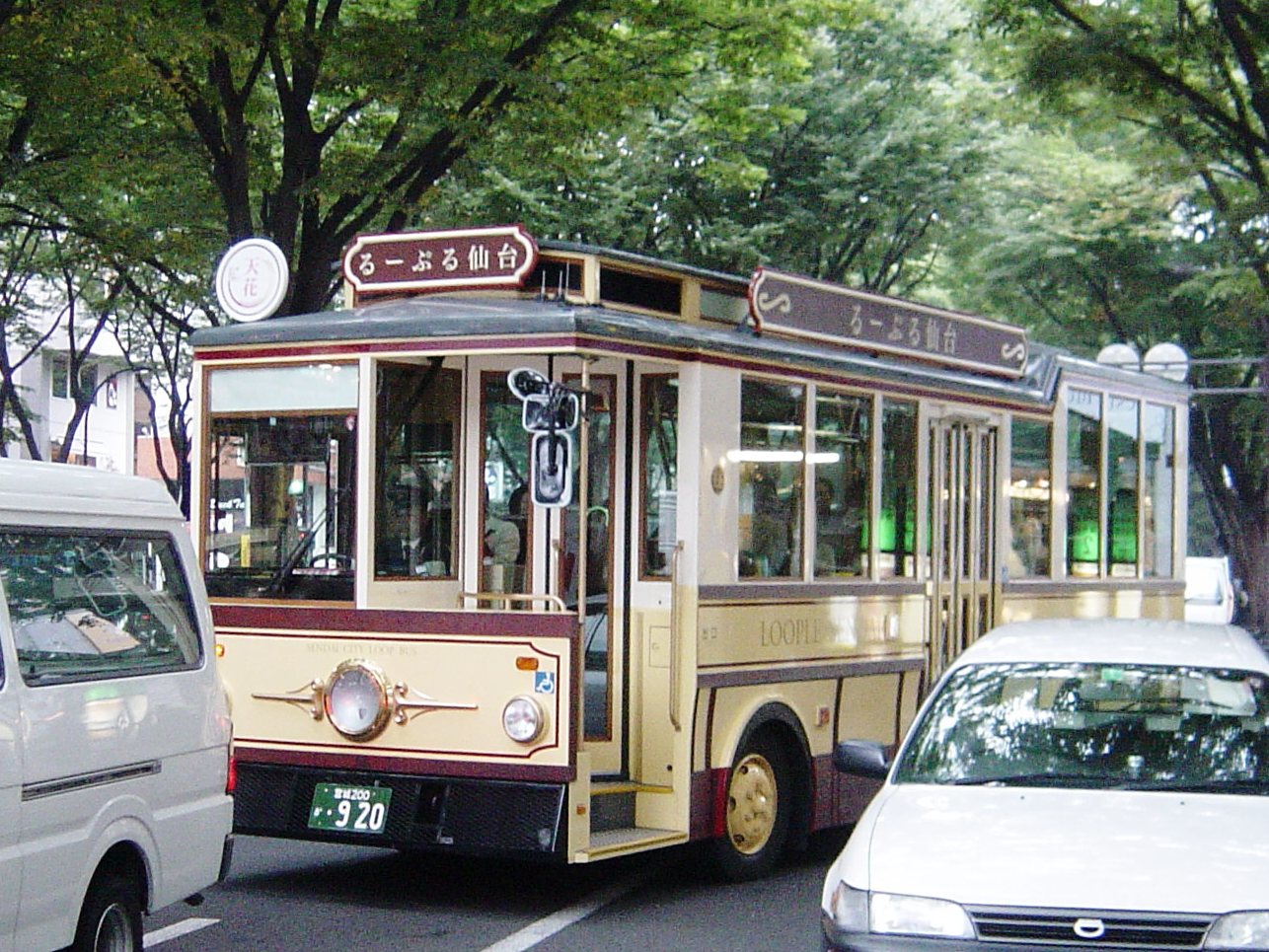
"Loople Sendai", a sightseeing bus by Sendai City Bus.

=== Aomori Prefecture ===
- Aomori City Transportation Division (Aomori City Bus) 青森市交通部 (青森市営バス)
- Hachinohe City Transportation Division (Hachinohe City Bus) 八戸市交通部 (八戸市営バス)
- Kokusai Kōgyō Group 国際興業グループ
  - Towada Kankō Dentetsu 十和田観光電鉄
- Kōnan Bus 弘南バス
- Nanbu Bus 南部バス
- Shimokita Kōtsū 下北交通

=== Akita Prefecture ===
- Akita Chuoukoutsu 秋田中央交通
  - Akita Chuou Transport 秋田中央トランスポート
- Kokusai Kōgyō Group 国際興業グループ
  - Shūhoku Bus 秋北バス
- Ugo Kōtsū 羽後交通

=== Iwate Prefecture ===
- Iwate Kenpoku Bus 岩手県北自動車 (岩手県北バス)
- Iwate Kyūkō Bus 岩手急行バス
- Kokusai Kōgyō Group 国際興業グループ
  - Iwatekenkōtsū 岩手県交通
    - Hayachine Bus 早池峰バス

=== Miyagi Prefecture ===
- Ayashi Kankō Bus 愛子観光バス
- Higashi Nippon Express 東日本急行
- JR Group JRグループ
  - JR Bus Tōhoku ジェイアールバス東北
- Meitetsu Group 名鉄グループ
  - Miyagi Transportation 宮城交通
    - Miyakō Bus ミヤコーバス
- Sendai City Transportation Bureau (Sendai City Bus) 仙台市交通局 (仙台市営バス)
- Tōhoku Kyūkō Bus 東北急行バス

=== Yamagata Prefecture ===
- Asahi Kōtsū あさひ交通
- Atsumi Kōtsū あつみ交通
- Mogamigawa Koutsuu 最上川交通
- Shōnai Kōtsū 庄内交通
  - Shōnai Kōtsū Kankō Bus Hire 庄内交通観光バス・ハイヤー
- Yamakō Bus 山交バス
- Yuza Kōtsū ゆざ交通

=== Fukushima Prefecture ===
- Aizu Bus 会津乗合自動車 (会津バス)
- Bandai Tōto Bus 磐梯東都バス
- Fukushima Transportation 福島交通
- Sakura Kōtsū 桜交通
- Shin Jōban Kōtsū 新常磐交通

== Kantō region ==
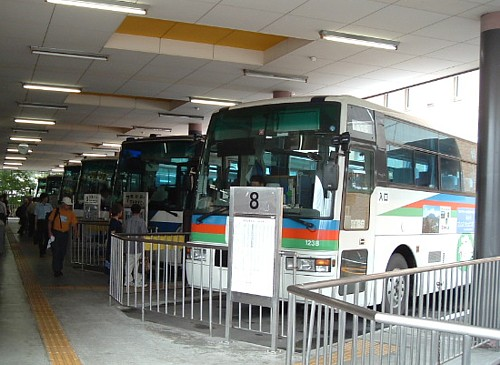
Seibu Bus cars at Kusatsu-Onsen Bus Station.

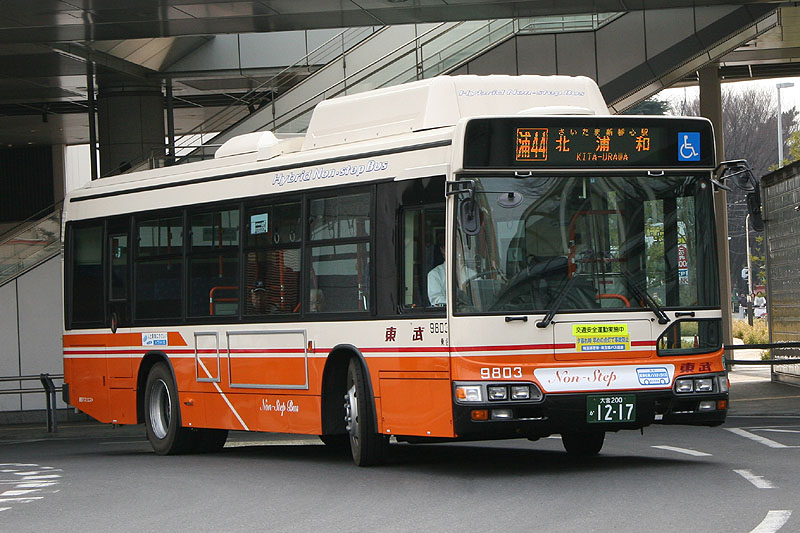
Tōbu Bus, Saitama.

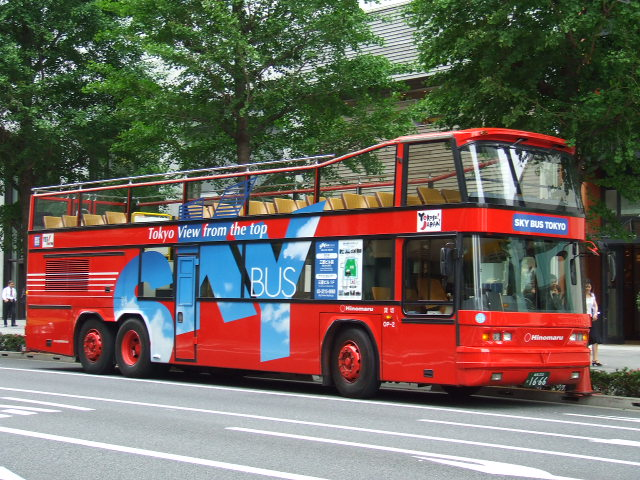
Sky Bus Tōkyō, Hinomaru Limousine.

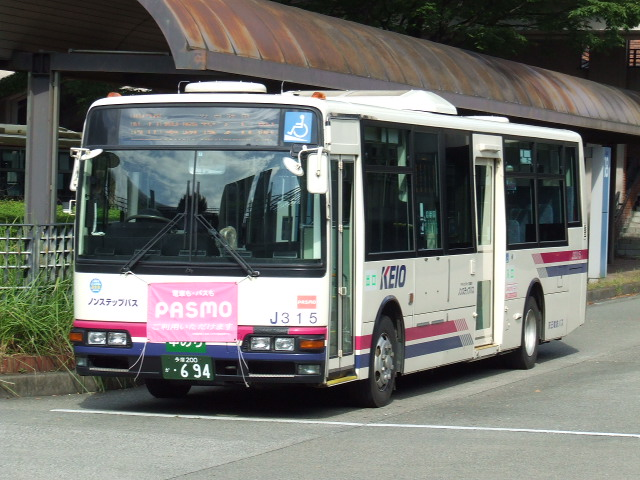
Keiō Bus.

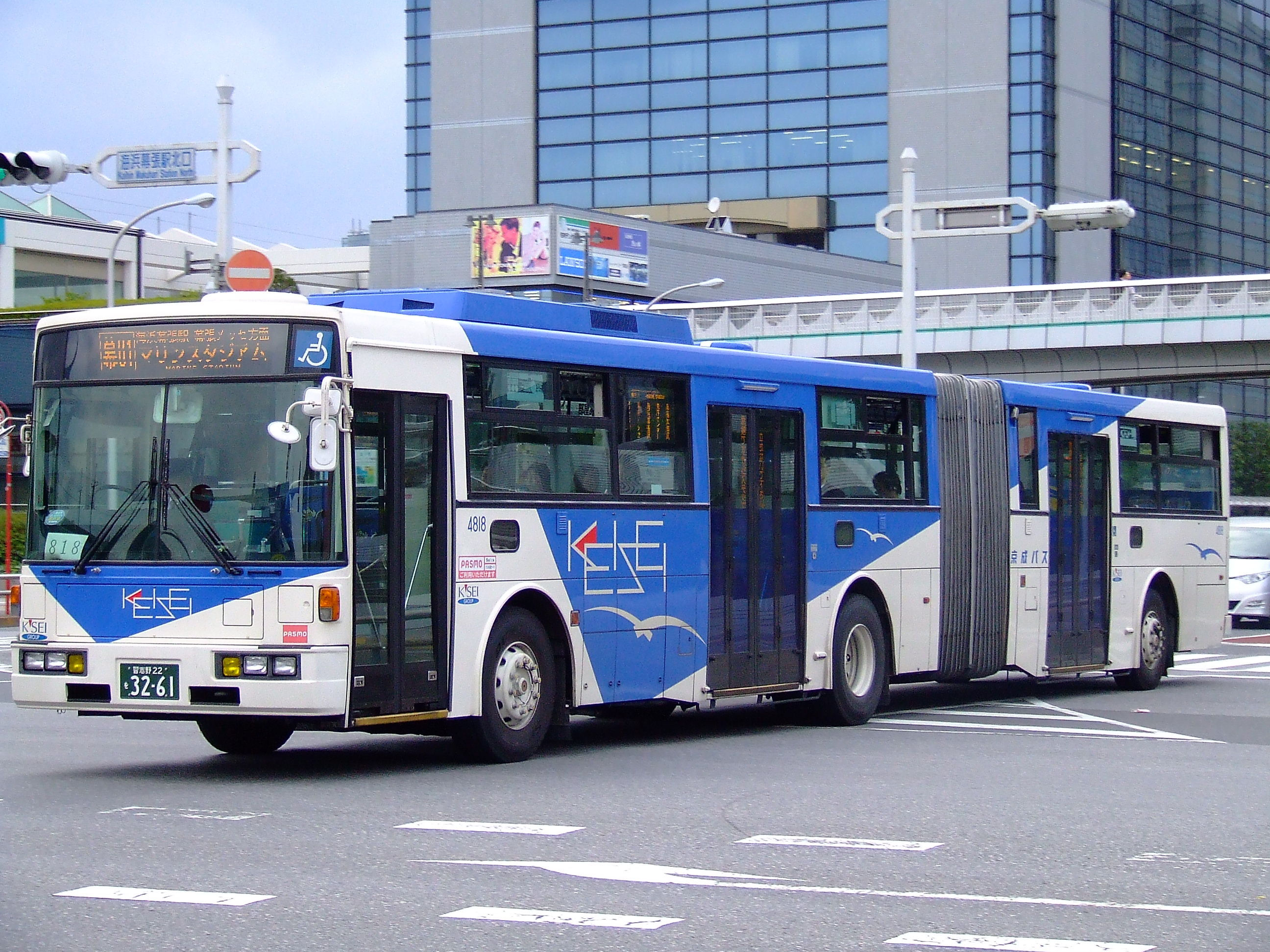
"Twin Bus", Keisei Bus.

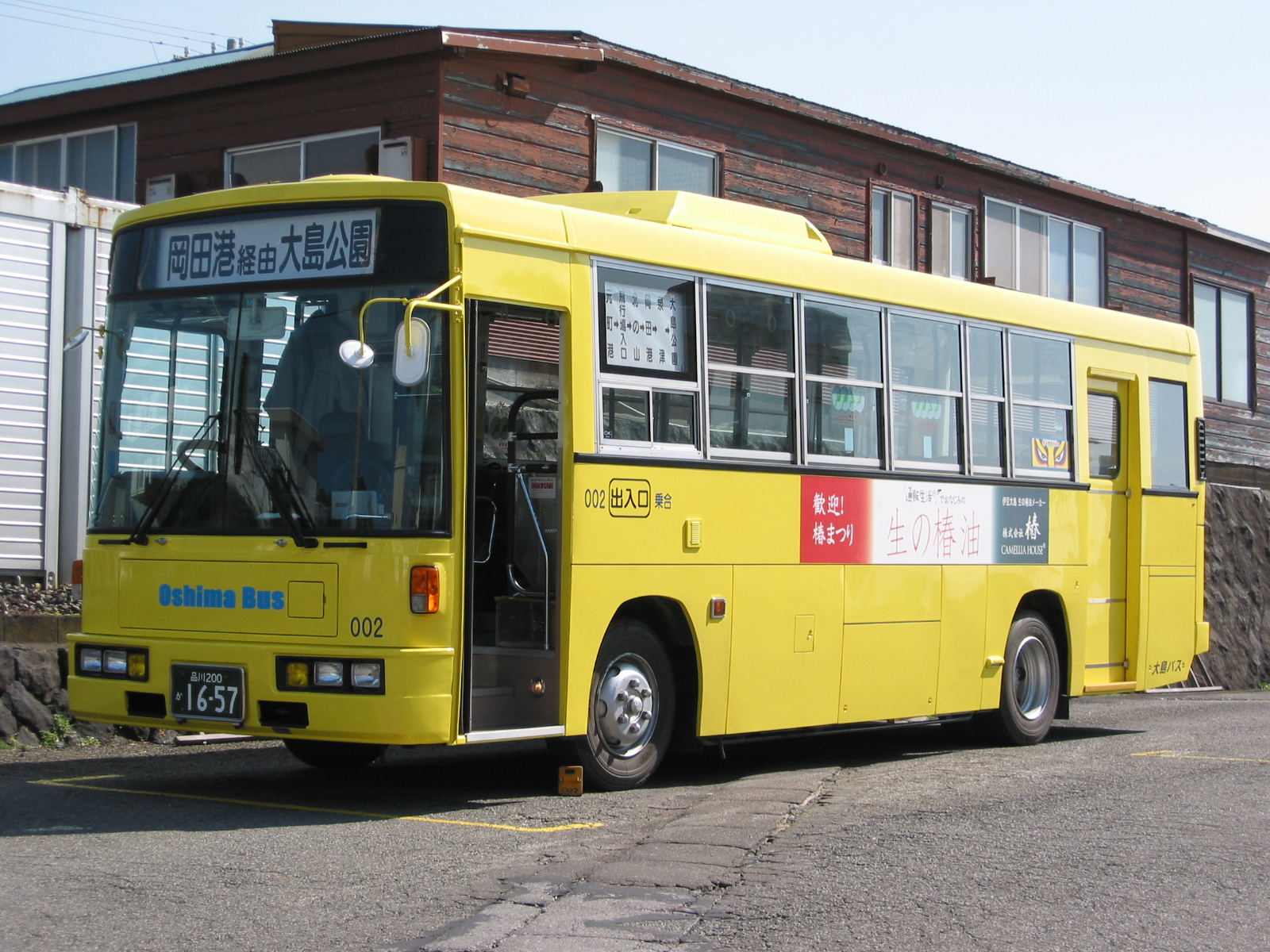
Ōshima Bus car at Izu Ōshima Island.

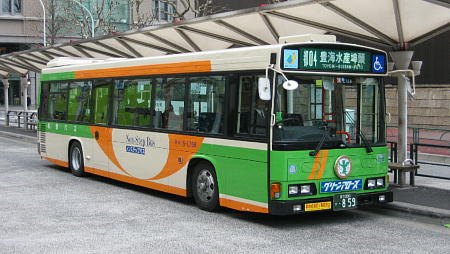
Toei Bus at Tokyo Station.

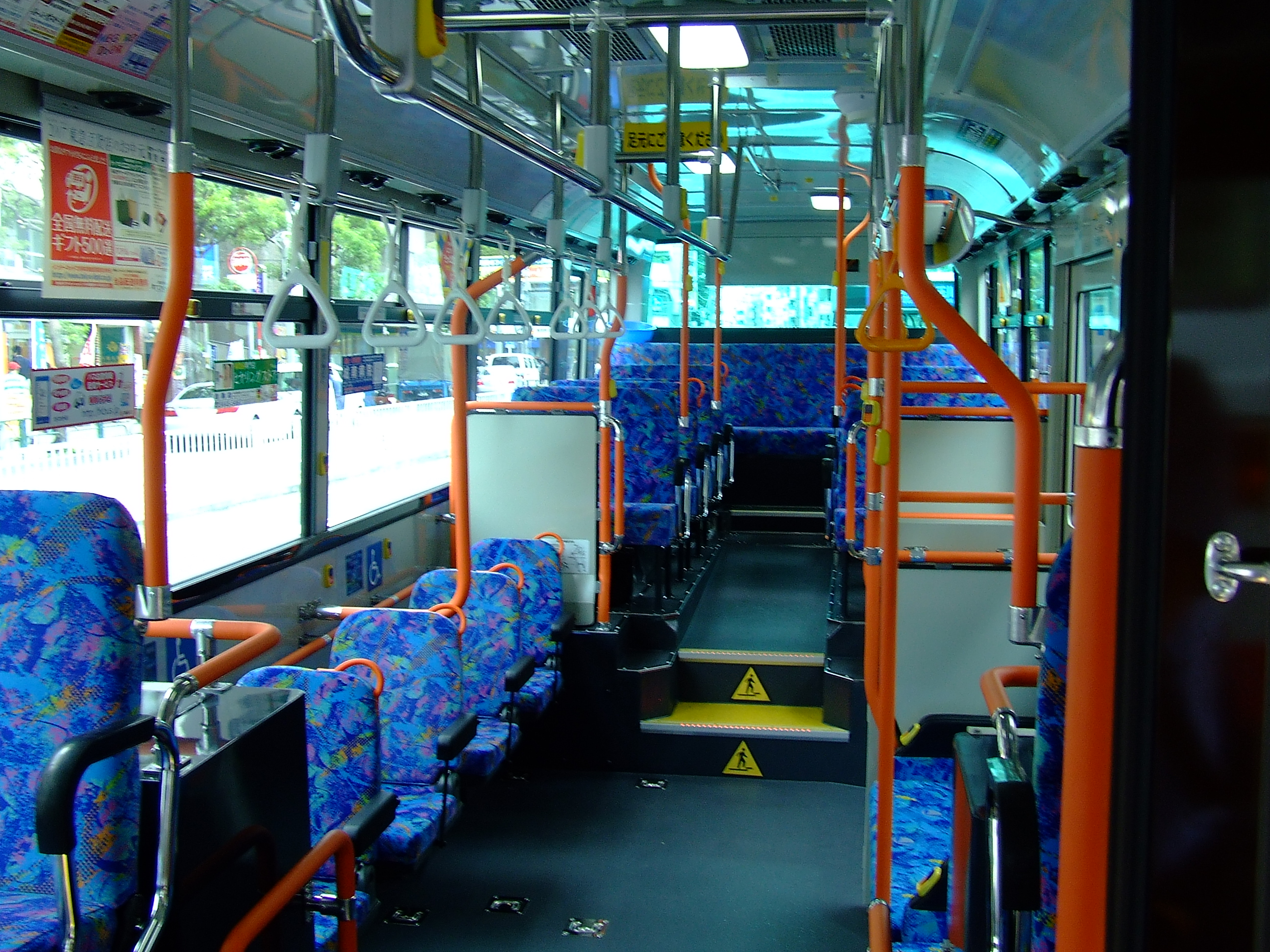
A local Tōkyū Bus car interior.

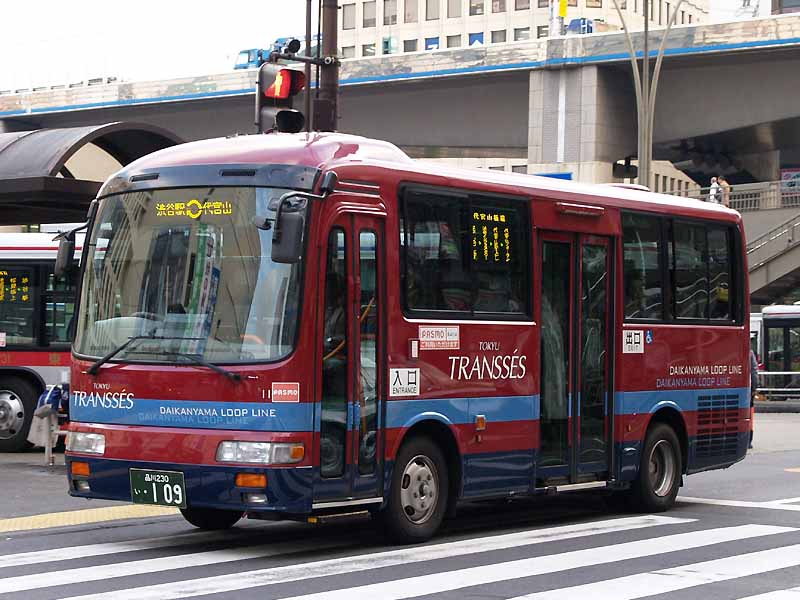
Tōkyū Transsés bus at Shibuya Station.

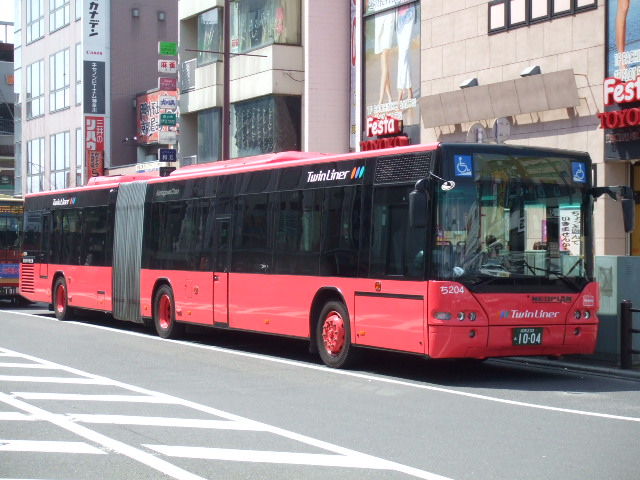
"Twin Liner", Kanagawa Chūō Kōtsū.

=== Ibaraki Prefecture ===
- Hitachi Dentetsu Transportation Service 日立電鉄交通サービス
- Ibaraki Kōtsū 茨城交通
- Keisei Group 京成グループ
  - Kantō Railway 関東鉄道
    - Kantetsu Green Bus 関鉄グリーンバス
    - Kantetsu Kankō Bus 関鉄観光バス
    - Kantetsu Purple Bus 関鉄パープルバス
- Ōtone Kōtsū Motor 大利根交通自動車

=== Tochigi Prefecture ===
- Michinori Holdings ja:みちのりホールディングス
  - Kanto Transportation 関東自動車
    - Tōya Kōtsū 東野交通
- Tōbu Group 東武グループ
  - Nikkō Kōtsū 日光交通
  - Tōbu Bus Nikkō 東武バス日光

=== Gunma Prefecture ===
- Gunma Bus 群馬バス
- Gunma Chūō Bus 群馬中央バス
- Jōshin Dentetsu 上信電鉄
- Nagai Transportation (Jōshū Kankō Bus) 永井運輸 (上州観光バス)
- Nippon Chūō Bus 日本中央バス
- Tōbu Group 東武グループ
  - Kan-etsu Kōtsū 関越交通
- Vortex Ark ボルテックスアーク
- Yajima Taxi 矢島タクシー

=== Saitama Prefecture ===
- Chichibu Railway Sightseeing Bus 秩父鉄道観光バス
- Daiwa Kankō Bus 大和観光自動車
- Eagle Bus イーグルバス
- Hokuto Kōtsū 北斗交通
- Iijima Kōgyō 飯島興業
- Japan Tarō's ジャパンタローズ
- Kyōdō Kankō Bus 協同観光バス
- Life Bus ライフバス
- Mētō Kankō メートー観光
- Musashi Kankō 武蔵観光
- My Sky Kōtsū マイスカイ交通
- Seibu Group 西武グループ
  - Seibu Bus 西武バス ^{C PA}
  - Seibu Kankō Bus 西武観光バス ^{C}
- Tōbu Group 東武グループ
  - Asahi Motor 朝日自動車
  - Ibakyū Motor 茨城急行自動車
  - Kawagoe Motor 川越観光自動車 ^{C}
  - Kokusai Jūō 国際十王交通 ^{C}
  - Tōbu Bus West 東武バスウエスト ^{C PA}

=== Chiba Prefecture ===
- Be-Transse Group ビィー・トランセホールディングス
  - Aska Kōtsū あすか交通
  - Heiwa Kōtsū 平和交通
- Keisei Group 京成グループ
  - Chiba Kōtsū 千葉交通
  - Chibakō Taxi (Chibakō Bus) 千葉交タクシー (ちばこうバス)
  - Chiba Chūō Bus 千葉中央バス ^{C}
  - Chiba City Bus ちばシティバス ^{C}
  - Chiba Flower Bus ちばフラワーバス ^{C}
  - Chiba Green Bus ちばグリーンバス ^{C}
  - Chiba Kaihin Kōtsū 千葉海浜交通 ^{C}
  - Chiba Nairiku Bus 千葉内陸バス ^{C}
  - Chiba Rainbow Bus ちばレインボーバス ^{C}
  - Hokusō Kōtsū 北総交通
  - Keisei Bus 京成バス
  - Keisei Bus System 京成バスシステム
  - Keisei Transit Bus 京成トランジットバス ^{C}
  - Kujūkuri Railway 九十九里鉄道
    - Kominato Railway 小湊鐵道
  - Narita Airport Transport 成田空港交通
  - Sakura Kōtsū 佐倉交通
  - Tōkyō Bay City Kōtsū 東京ベイシティ交通 ^{C}
- Nittō Kōtsū 日東交通
  - Amaha Nittō Bus 天羽日東バス
  - Kamogawa Nittō Bus 鴨川日東バス
  - Tateyama Nittō Bus 館山日東バス
- Tōbu Group 東武グループ
  - Bandō Bus 阪東自動車
  - Tōbu Bus East 東武バスイースト ^{C}
- Tōyō Bus 東洋バス
  - Chiba Seaside Bus 千葉シーサイドバス

=== Tokyo Metropolis ===
- Airport Transport Service
- Daishintō 大新東
- Fujikyū Group 富士急グループ
  - Fuji Express フジエクスプレス
- Hachijō Town Public Enterprise Division Transportation Section (Hachijō Town Bus) 八丈町企業課運輸係 (八丈町営バス)
- Hato Bus はとバス

Sightseeing buses only.

- Hinomaru Limousine 日の丸リムジン
  - HMC Tokyo HMC東京
- Hitachi Jidōsha Kōtsū 日立自動車交通
- JR East Group
  - JR Bus Kantō ジェイアールバス関東
    - JR Bus Tech ジェイアールバステック
- Kantō Bus 関東バス ^{C PA}
- Keikyū Group
  - Keihin Kyūkō Bus 京浜急行バス ^{C PA}
    - Haneda Keikyū Bus 羽田京急バス ^{C PA}
- Keiō Group
  - Keiō Dentetsu Bus^{C PA}
    - Keiō Bus Chūō 京王バス中央 ^{C PA}
    - Keiō Bus Higashi 京王バス東 ^{C PA}
    - Keiō Bus Koganei 京王バス小金井 ^{C PA}
    - Keiō Bus Minami 京王バス南 ^{C}
  - Nishi Tōkyō Bus 西東京バス ^{C}
- Keisei Group
  - Keisei Bus 京成バス ^{C PA}
  - Keisei Town Bus 京成タウンバス ^{C PA}
- km Group kmグループ
  - km Kankō Bus ケイエム観光バス
- Kokusai Kōgyō Group 国際興業グループ
  - Kokusai Kōgyō Bus 国際興業バス ^{C PA}
- Miyake Village Public Enterprise Division Transportation Sector (Miyake Village Bus) 三宅村企業課運輸係 (三宅村営バス)
- Odakyū Group
  - Odakyū Bus 小田急バス ^{C PA}
    - Odakyū City Bus 小田急シティバス ^{C PA}
  - Odakyū Hakone Highway Bus 小田急箱根高速バス
  - Tachikawa Bus 立川バス ^{C}
    - City Bus Tachikawa シティバス立川 ^{C}
- Ogasawara Village Industry And Tourism Division (Ogasawara Village Bus) 小笠原村産業観光課 (小笠原村営バス)
- Ōshima Ryokaku Motor (Ōshima Bus) 大島旅客自動車 (大島バス)
- Seibu Group
  - Seibu Motor 西武自動車 ^{C}
- Shinnihon Sightseeing Bus 新日本観光自動車
- Tōbu Group
  - Tōbu Bus Central 東武バスセントラル ^{C PA}
  - Tōhoku Kyūkō Bus 東北急行バス
- Tōkyō Metropolitan Bureau of Transportation (Toei Bus)^{C PA}
- Tōkyū Group
  - Tōkyū Bus 東急バス ^{C PA}
  - Tōkyū Transsés 東急トランセ ^{C}

=== Kanagawa Prefecture ===
- Fujikyū Group 富士急グループ
  - Fujikyū Shōnan Bus 富士急湘南バス ^{C}
- Kawasaki City Transportation Bureau (Kawasaki City Bus) 川崎市交通局 (川崎市営バス) ^{C PA}
- Keikyū Group 京急グループ
  - Kawasaki Tsurumi Rinkō Bus 川崎鶴見臨港バス ^{C PA}
  - Shōnan Keikyū Bus 湘南京急バス ^{C}
  - Yokohama Keikyū Bus 横浜京急バス ^{C PA}
- Odakyū Group 小田急グループ
  - Enoshima Electric Railway 江ノ島電鉄 ^{C PA}
    - Enoden Bus 江ノ電バス ^{C PA}
  - Hakone Tozan Bus 箱根登山バス ^{C PA}
  - Kanagawa Chūō Kōtsū 神奈川中央交通 ^{C PA}
    - Fujisawa Kanakō Bus 藤沢神奈交バス ^{C}
    - Sagami Kanakō Bus 相模神奈交バス ^{C}
    - Shōnan Kanakō Bus 湘南神奈交バス ^{C}
    - Tsukui Kanakō Bus 津久井神奈交バス ^{C}
    - Yokohama Kanakō Bus 横浜神奈交バス ^{C}
- Sōtetsu Group 相鉄グループ
  - Sōtetsu Bus 相鉄バス ^{C PA}
- Tōkyō Bay Service 東京ベイサービス
- Yokohama City Transportation Bureau (Yokohama City Bus) 横浜市交通局 (横浜市営バス) ^{C PA}
  - Yokohama Traffic Development 横浜交通開発 ^{C}

== Chūbu region ==
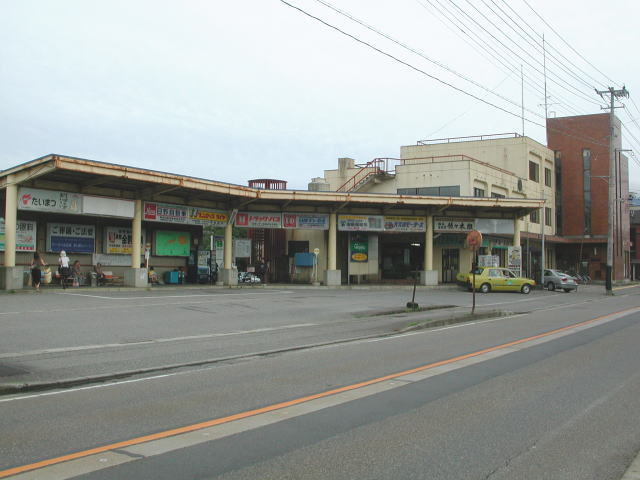
Muramatsu Bus Terminal, Kanbara Tetsudō.

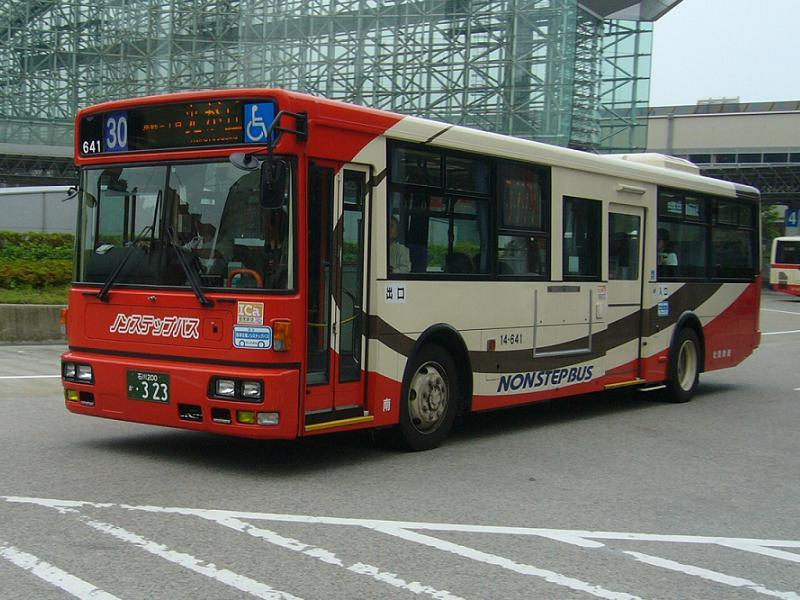
Hokuriku Railroad bus, Kanazawa.

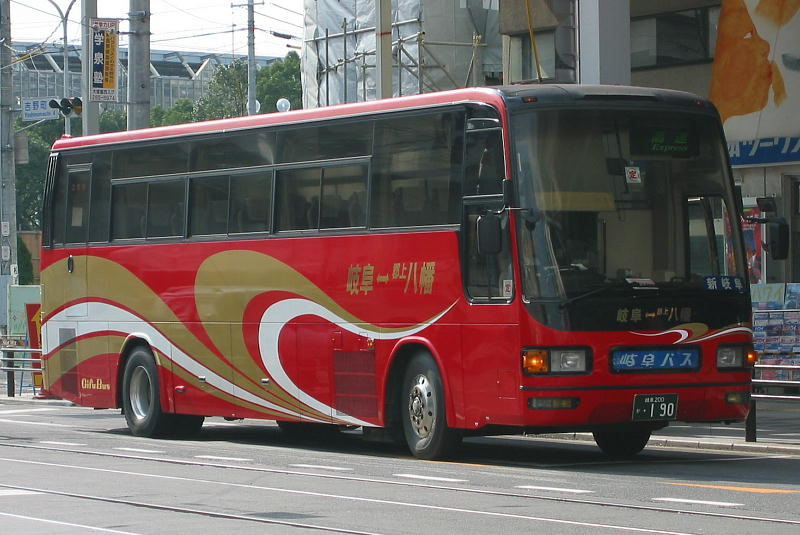
A highway Gifu Bus car.

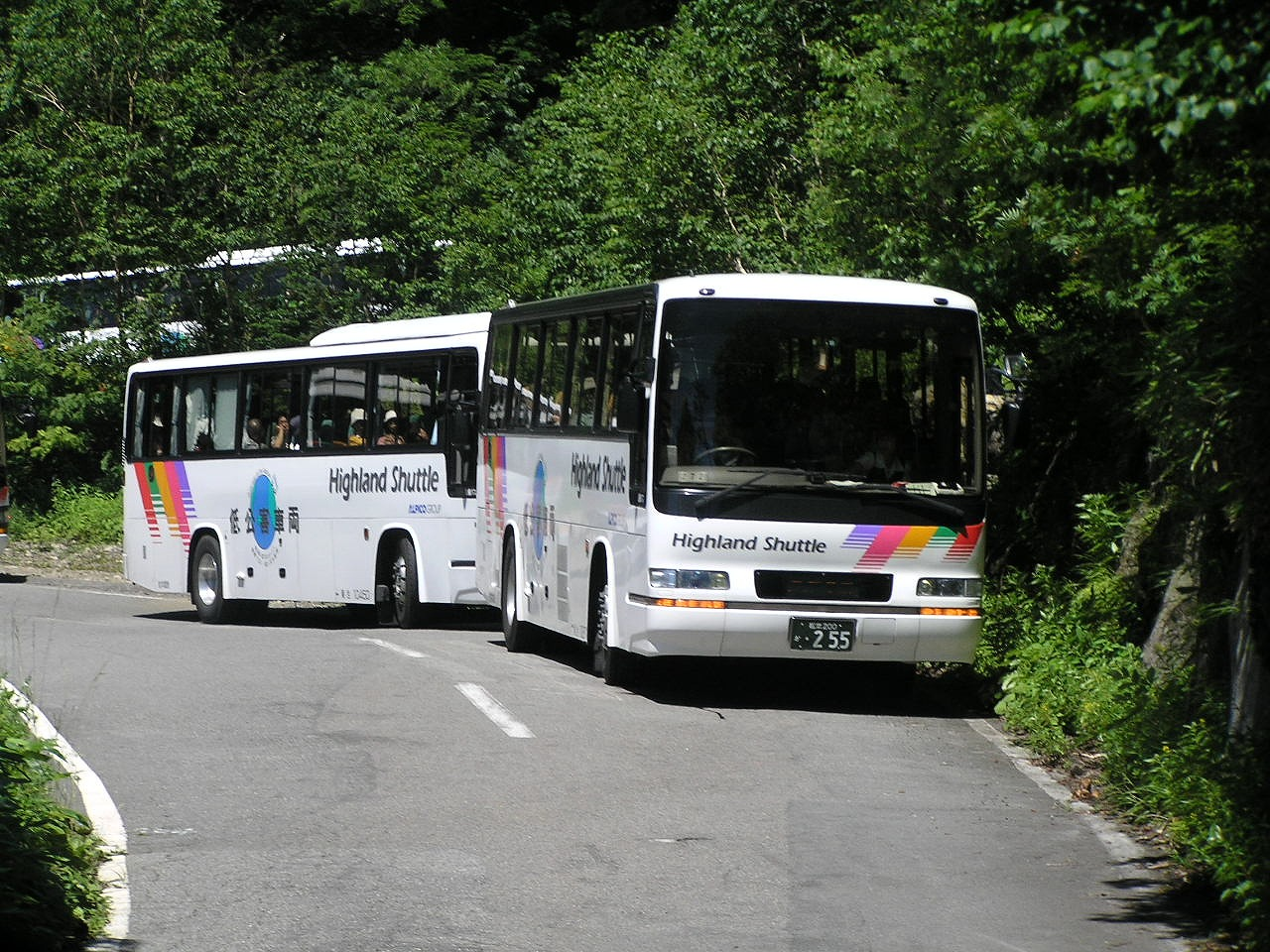
Matsumoto Dentetsu Bus cars, Mount Norikura.

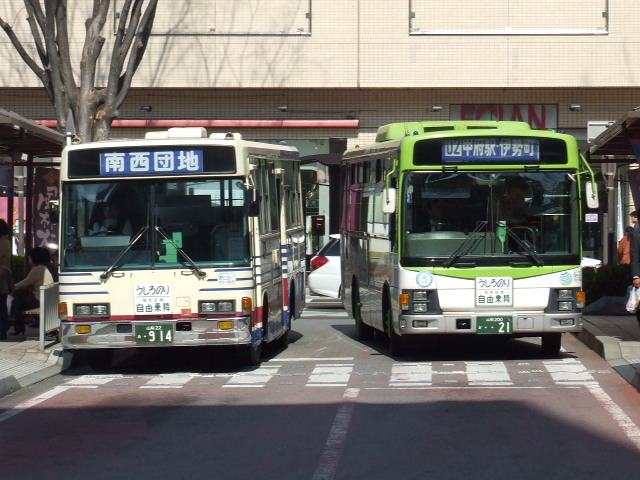
Yamanashi Kōtsū bus cars, Kōfu.

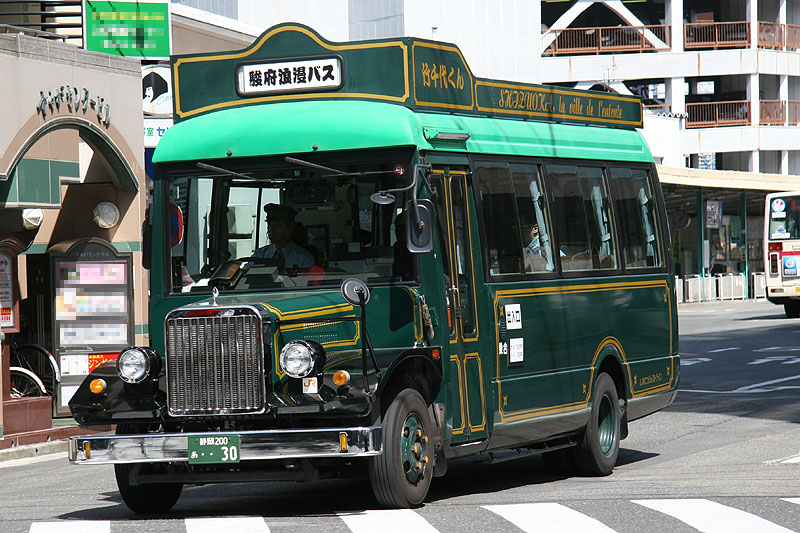
A sightseeing bus by Shizutetsu Justline.

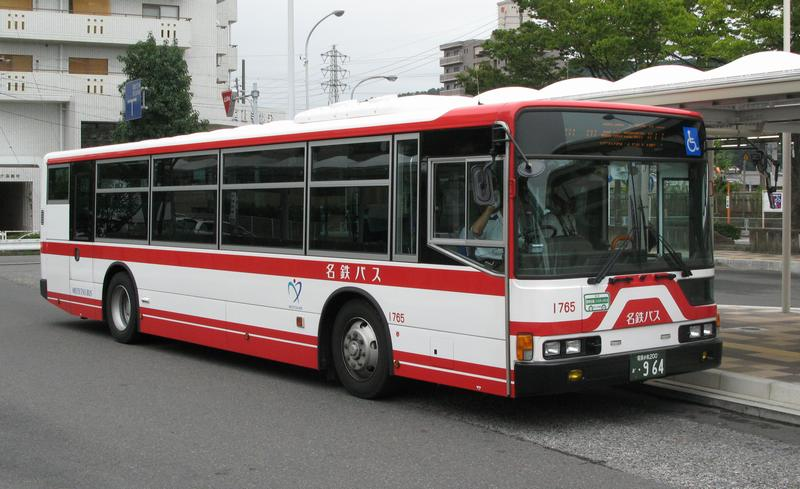
Meitetsu Bus, Nagoya.

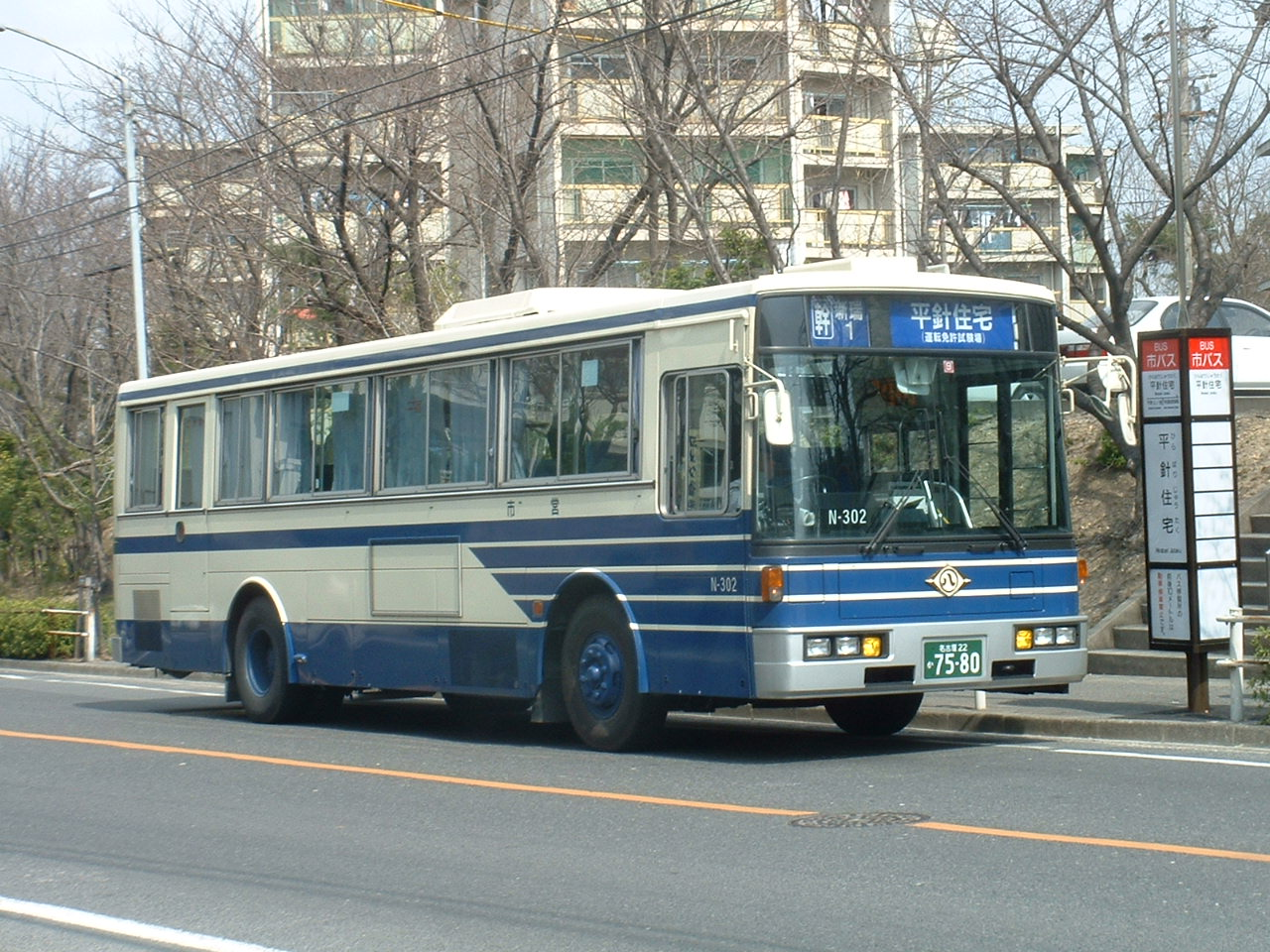
Nagoya City Bus.

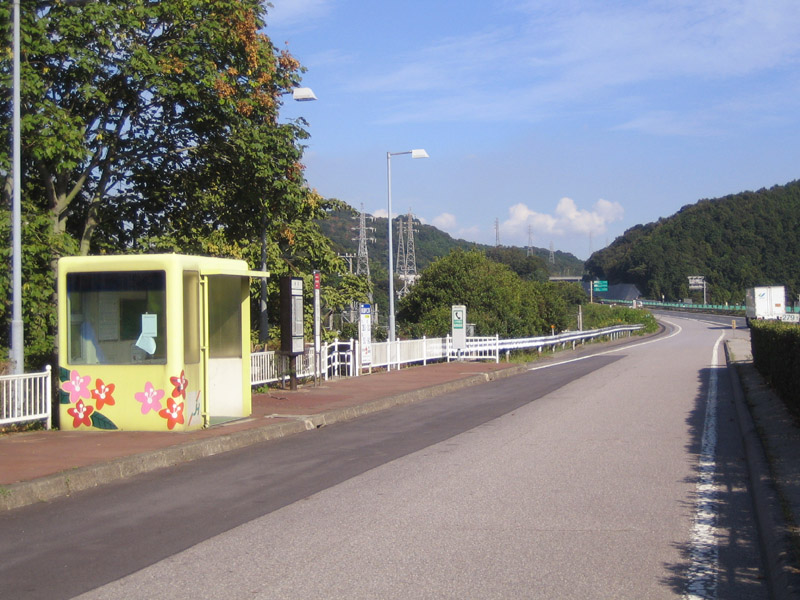
Otowa Bus Stop on Tōmei Expressway, Aichi Prefecture.

=== Niigata Prefecture ===
- Echigo Kōtsū 越後交通
  - Kita Echigo Kankō Bus 北越後観光バス
  - Minami Echigo Kankō Bus 南越後観光バス
- Kubiki Motor 頸城自動車
  - Itoigawa Bus 糸魚川バス
  - Keihoku Kankō Bus 頸北観光バス
  - Keinan Bus 頸南バス
  - Kubikino Bus くびき野バス
  - Tōkei Bus 東頸バス
- Niigata Kōtsū 新潟交通
  - Niigata Kōtsū Kankō Bus 新潟交通観光バス
  - Niigata Kōtsū Sado 新潟交通佐渡
- Tainai Kōtsū 胎内交通

=== Toyama Prefecture ===
- Dolphin Traffic イルカ交通
- Uozu Kotsu 魚津交通
- Kaiō Kōtsū 海王交通
- Tateyama Kurobe Kankō 立山黒部貫光
- Toyama Chihō Railway 富山地方鉄道
  - Toyama Chitetsu Hokuto Bus 富山地鉄北斗バス
  - Kaetsunō Bus 加越能バス

=== Ishikawa Prefecture ===
- Meitetsu Group 名鉄グループ
  - Hokuriku Railroad 北陸鉄道
    - Hokutetsu Kanazawa Bus 北鉄金沢バス
    - Hokutetsu Noto Bus 北鉄能登バス
    - Hokutetsu Okunoto Bus 北鉄奥能登バス
    - Kaga Hakusan Bus 加賀白山バス
    - Kaga Onsen Bus 加賀温泉バス
    - Komatsu Bus 小松バス
- Notojima Kōtsū 能登島交通

=== Fukui Prefecture ===
- Keihan Group 京阪グループ
  - Keifuku Bus 京福バス
- Meitetsu Group 名鉄グループ
  - Fukui Railway 福井鉄道
- Yamato Kōtsū 大和交通

=== Gifu Prefecture ===
- Heiwa Corporation 平和コーポレーション
- Meitetsu Group 名鉄グループ
  - Gifu Bus 岐阜乗合自動車 (岐阜バス)
    - Kayo Autotech 華陽オートテック株式会社
  - Kita Ena Kōtsū 北恵那交通
  - Chita Noriai (Chita Bus) 知多乗合株式会社
  - Nōhi Noriai Jidōsha (Nōhi Bus) 濃飛乗合自動車 (濃飛バス)
- Tohnoh Tetsudou (Tohtetsu Bus) 東濃鉄道 (東鉄バス)

=== Nagano Prefecture ===
- Chikuma Bus 千曲バス
- Chūō Alps Kankō 中央アルプス観光
- Ina Bus 伊那バス
- Kanden Amenix (Kita Alps Kōtsū) 関電アメニックス (北アルプス交通)
- Matsumoto Electric Railway (Matsumoto Dentetsu Bus) 松本電気鉄道 (松本電鉄バス)
  - Alpico Highland Bus アルピコハイランドバス
  - Kawanakajima Bus 川中島バス
  - Suwa Bus 諏訪バス
- Nagaden Bus 長電バス
- Ontake Kōtsū おんたけ交通
- Seibu Group 西武グループ
  - Seibu Kōgen Bus 西武高原バス
- Shinnan Koutsu 信南交通
- Syoei Kōsoku Unyu (Dot Com Liner) 昌栄高速運輸 (どっとこむライナー)
- Travis Japan (Hana Bus Kankō) トラビスジャパン (花バス観光)
- Kusakaru Kōtsū 草軽交通
  - Ueda Bus 上田バス

=== Yamanashi Prefecture ===
- Fujikyū Group 富士急グループ
  - Fuji Kyūkō 富士急行
  - Fujikyū Heiwa Kankō 富士急平和観光
  - Fujikyū Yamanashi Bus 富士急山梨バス
- Kokusai Kōgyō Group 国際興業グループ
  - Yamanashi Kōtsū 山梨交通
    - Yamakō Town Coach 山交タウンコーチ
    - Yamanashi Kashikiri Taxi 山梨貸切自動車

=== Shizuoka Prefecture ===
- Ensyū Railway (Entetsu Bus) 遠州鉄道 (遠鉄バス)
  - Akiha Bus Service 秋葉バスサービス
  - Kakegawa Bus Service 掛川バスサービス
- Fujikyū Group 富士急グループ
  - Fujikyū City Bus 富士急シティバス
  - Fujikyū Shizuoka Bus 富士急静岡バス
- Odakyū Group
  - Tōkai Bus 東海自動車
    - Izu Tōkai Bus 伊豆東海バス
    - Minami Izu Tōkai Bus 南伊豆東海バス
    - Naka Izu Tōkai Bus 中伊豆東海バス
    - Nishi Izu Tōkai Bus 西伊豆東海バス
    - Numazu Tozan Tōkai Bus 沼津登山東海バス
    - Shin Tōkai Bus 新東海バス
- Hamamatsu Bus 浜松バス
- Meitetsu Group 名鉄グループ
  - Ōigawa Railway (Daitetsu Bus) 大井川鐵道 (大鐵バス)
- Seibu Group 西武グループ
  - Izu Hakone Bus 伊豆箱根バス
- Shizutetsu Justline しずてつジャストライン

=== Aichi Prefecture ===
- Aoi Kōtsū あおい交通
- Hōei Kōtsū 豊栄交通
- JR Group JRグループ
  - JR Tōkai Bus ジェイアール東海バス
- Kintetsu Group 近鉄グループ
  - Meihan Kintetsu Bus 名阪近鉄バス
- Meitetsu Group 名鉄グループ
  - Chita Noriai (Chita Bus) 知多乗合 (知多バス)
  - Meitetsu Bus 名鉄バス
    - Meitetsu Bus Chūbu 名鉄バス中部
    - Meitetsu Bus Tōbu 名鉄バス東部
    - Meitetsu Kankō Bus 名鉄観光バス
  - Toyotetsu Bus 豊鉄バス
- Transportation Bureau City of Nagoya (Nagoya City Bus) 名古屋市交通局 (名古屋市営バス)

=== Mie Prefecture ===
- Sangi Railway (Sangi Bus) 三岐鉄道 (三岐バス)
- Chūnichi Rinkai Bus 中日臨海バス
- Kintetsu Group 近鉄グループ
  - Mie Kōtsū (Sanco Bus) 三重交通 (三交バス)
    - Happū Bus 八風バス
    - Mie Kyūkō Motor 三重急行自動車
    - Sanco Ise Shima Kōtsū 三交伊勢志摩交通
    - Sanco Nanki Kōtsū 三交南紀交通

== Kansai region ==
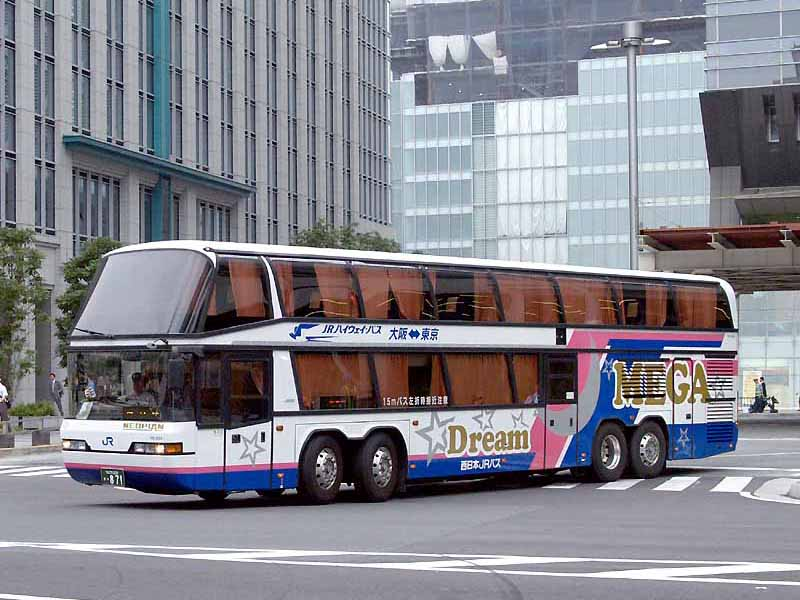
"Seishun Mega Dream", a double decker highway bus by West JR Bus.

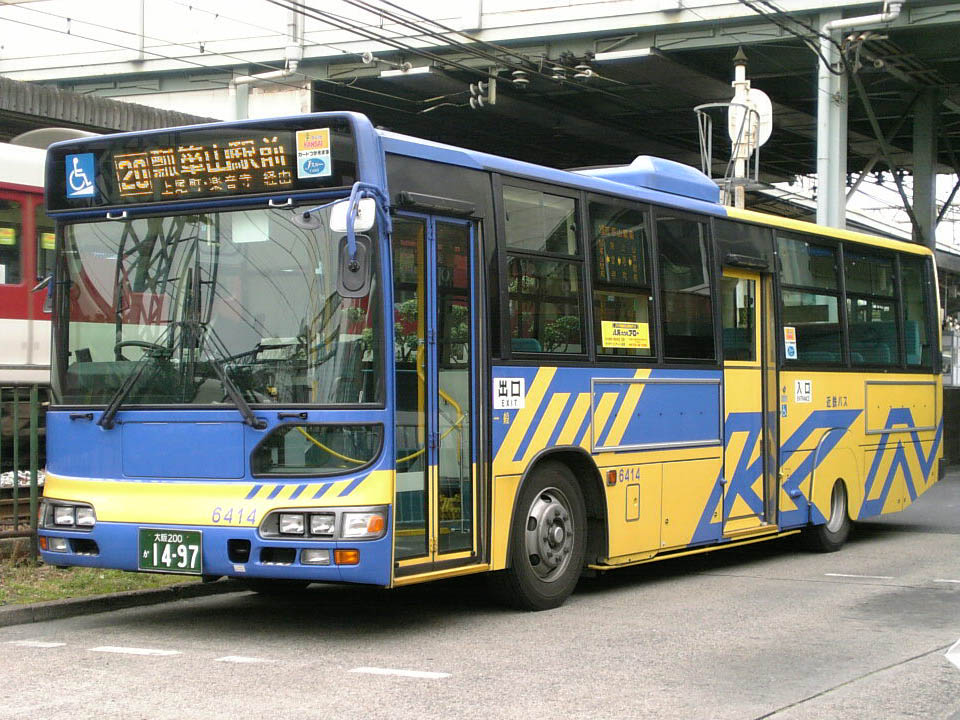
Kintetsu Bus.

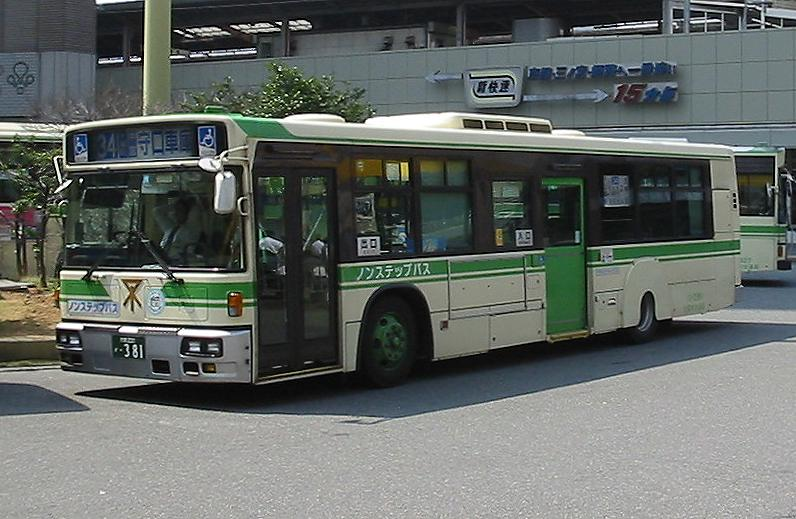
Ōsaka City Bus at Ōsaka Station.

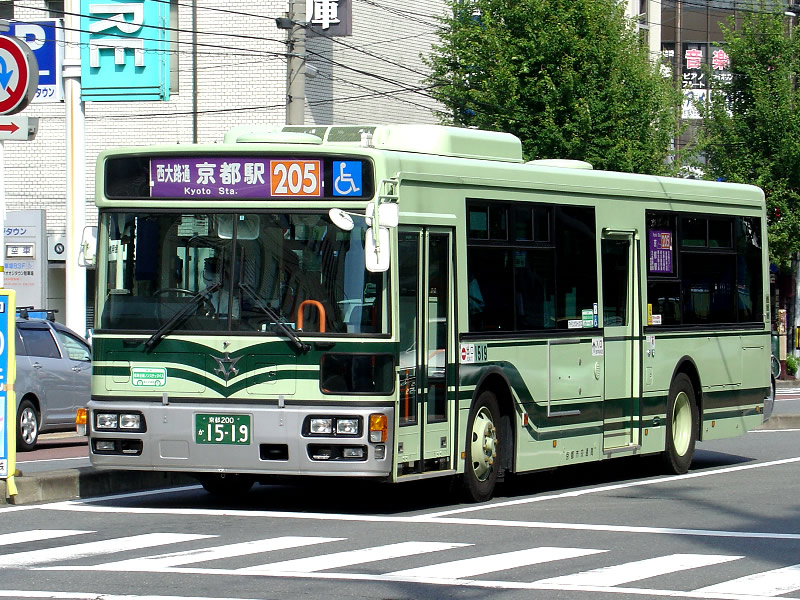
Kyōto City Bus.

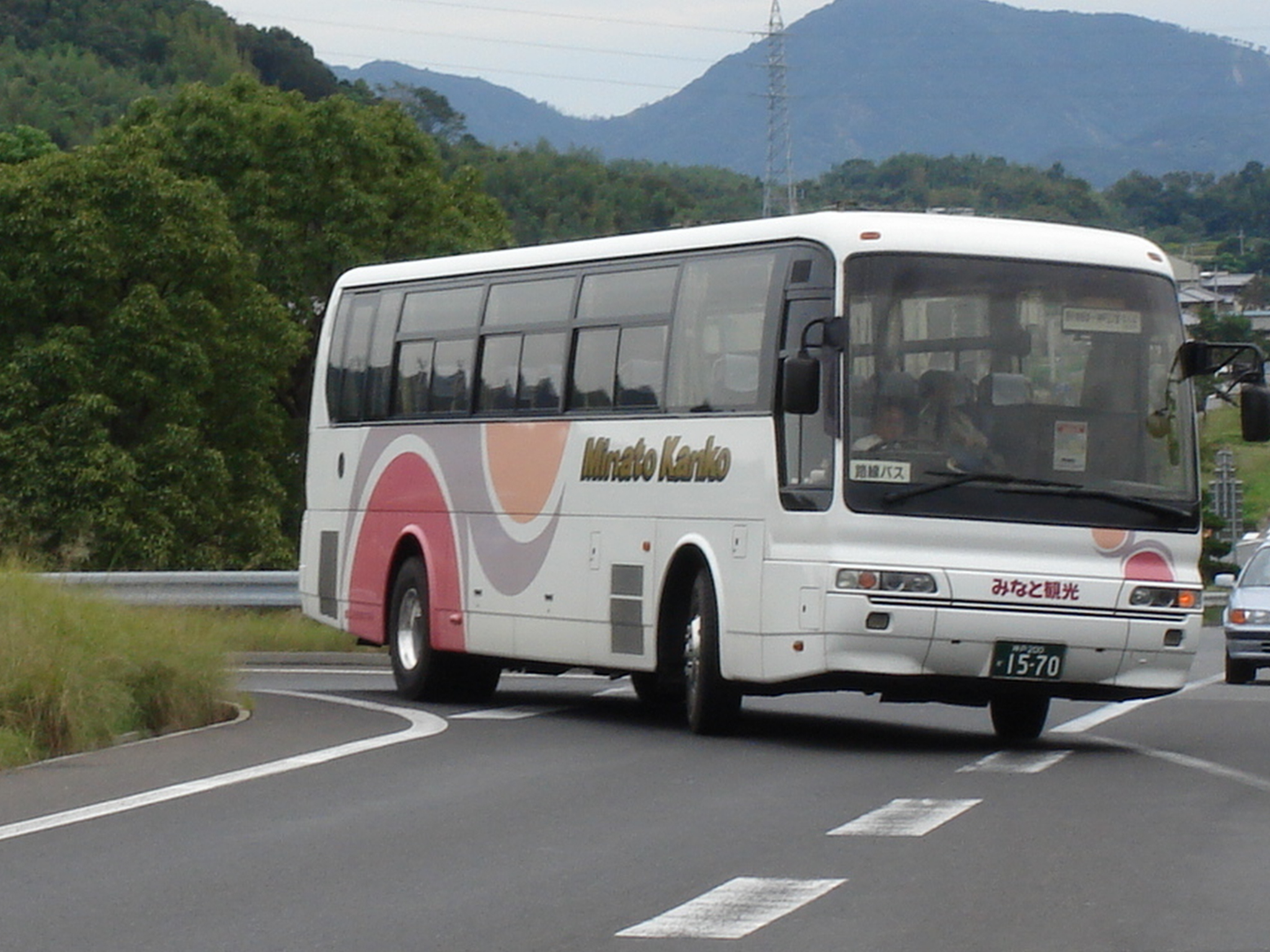
Minato Kankō Bus, Minamiawaji.

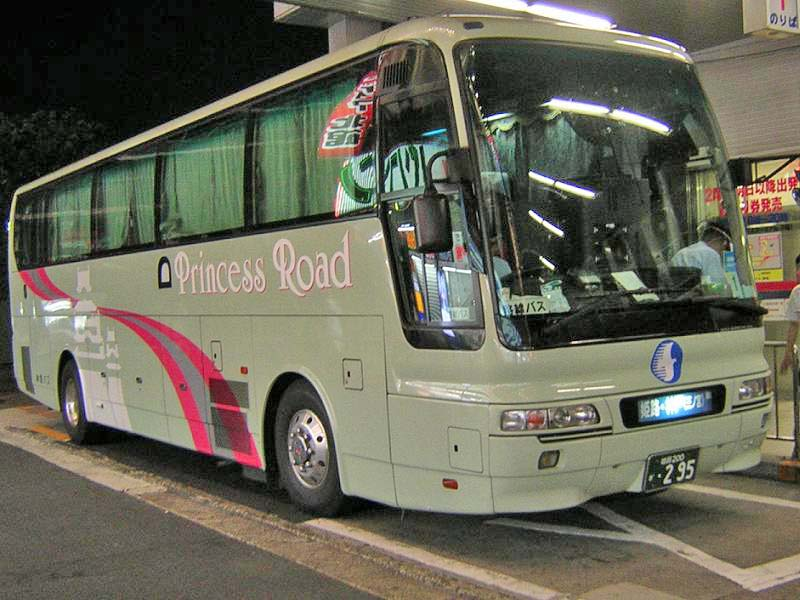
A highway Shinki Bus car.

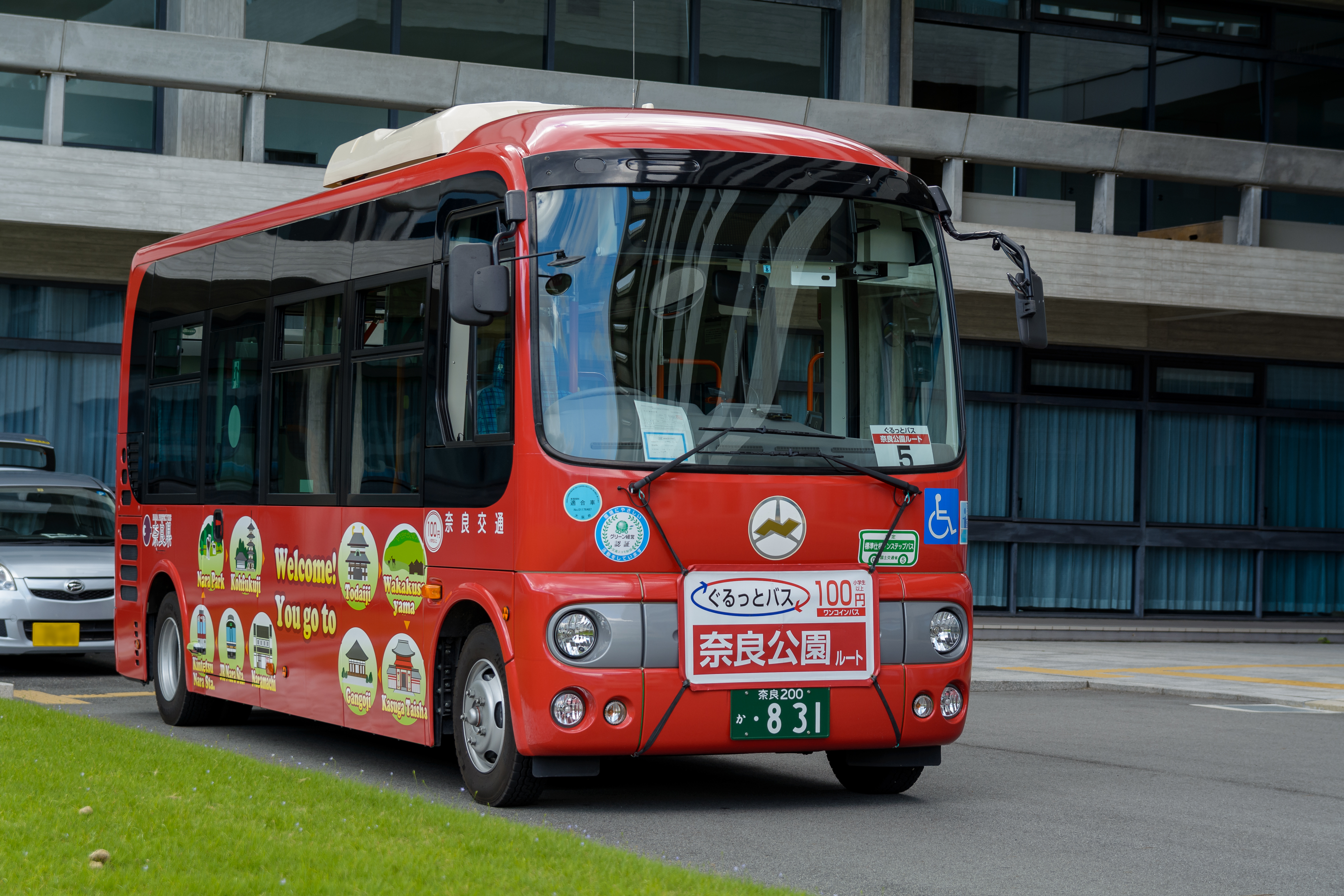
"Gurutto Bus Nara Park Route" by Nara Kōtsū, at Nara prefectural government office.

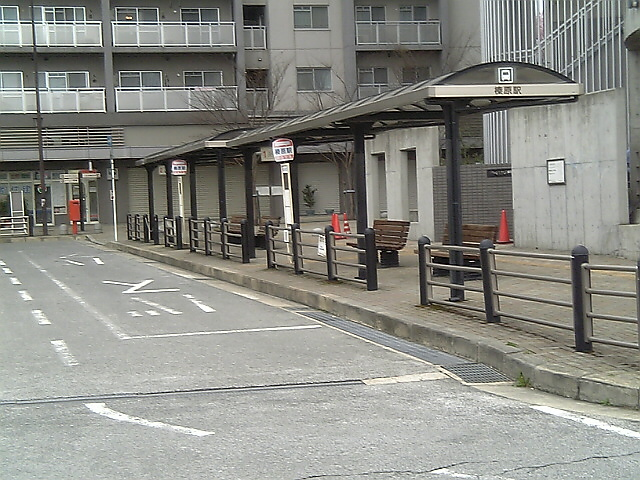
Haibara Station Bus Stop, Nara Kōtsū.

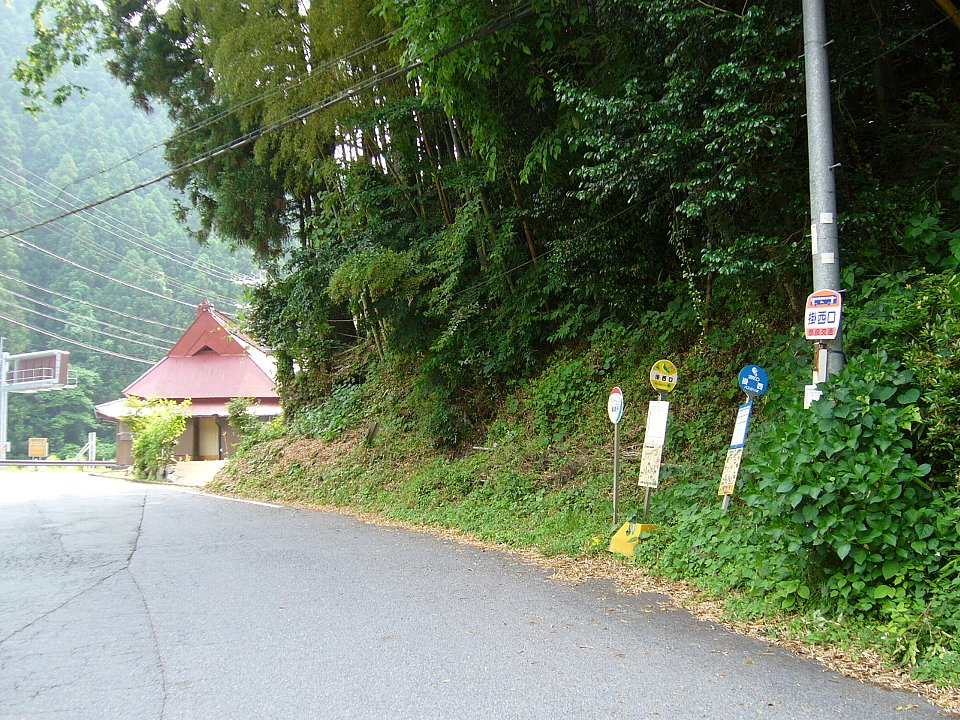
Bus stops in Nara countryside. Mie Kōtsū, Nara Kōtsū, a community bus and a school bus stop here.

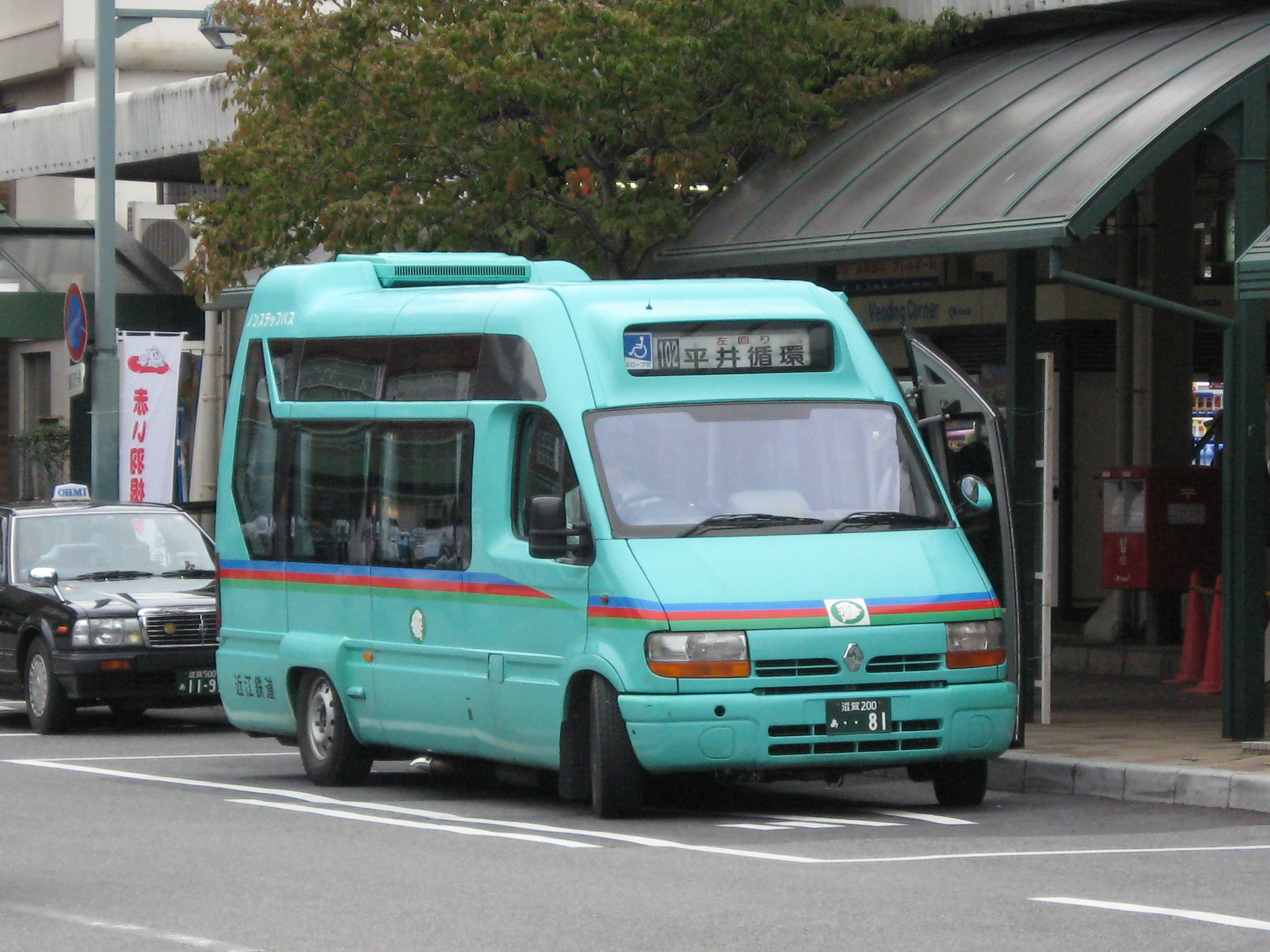
A small Ohmi Railway bus car.

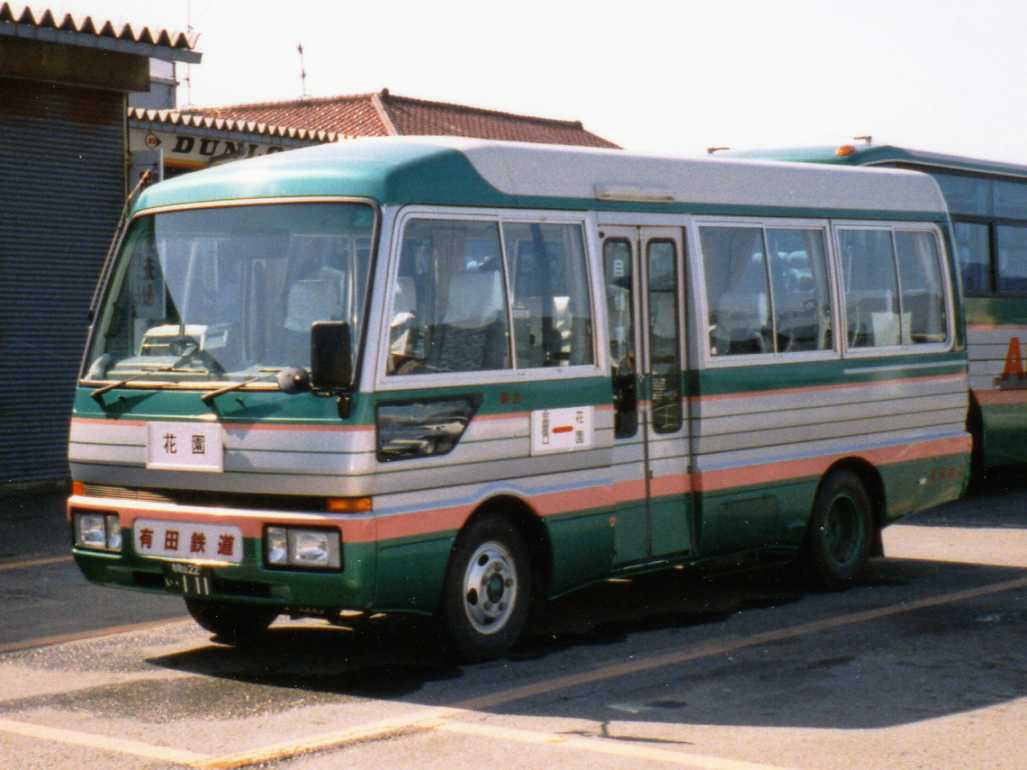
Arida Railway Bus.

=== Ōsaka Prefecture ===
- Hankyū Hanshin Holdings Group 阪急阪神ホールディングスグループ
  - Hankyū Bus 阪急バス ^{S Pi}
    - Hankyū Sight Seeing Bus 阪急観光バス
    - Ōsaka Airport Transport 大阪空港交通
  - Hanshin Electric Railway 阪神電気鉄道 ^{S}
- Hokkō Kankō Bus 北港観光バス
- JR Group JRグループ
  - West JR Bus 西日本ジェイアールバス
- Kintetsu Group 近鉄グループ
  - Kintetsu Bus 近鉄バス ^{S}
- Kokusai Kōgyō Group 国際興業グループ
  - Kokusai Kōgyō Ōsaka 国際興業大阪
- Kongō Motor (Kongō Bus) 金剛自動車 (金剛バス)
- Kyōto Kyukō Bus 京都急行バス (プリンセスライン)
- Mizuma Railway 水間鉄道
- Nankai Group 南海グループ
  - Kansai Airport Transportation 関西空港交通
  - Nankai Bus 南海バス
    - Nankai Wing Bus Kanaoka 南海ウイングバス金岡
    - Nankai Wing Bus Nanbu 南海ウイングバス南部
- Nihon Kōtsū 日本交通
  - Nikkō City Bus 日交シティバス
- Nihonjō Taxi 日本城タクシー
- Osaka Bus 大阪バス
- Ōsaka Municipal Transportation Bureau (Ōsaka City Bus) 大阪市交通局 (大阪市営バス) ^{S Pi}
  - Osaka Transportation Promotion 大阪シティバス ^{S}
- Takatsuki City Transportation Division 高槻市交通部 ^{S}
- Willer Express ウィラーエクスプレス

=== Kyōto Prefecture ===
- Chūkyō Kōtsū 中京交通
- Hankyū Hanshin Holdings Group 阪急阪神ホールディングスグループ
  - Tango Kairiku Kōtsū 丹後海陸交通
- Keihan Group 京阪グループ
  - Keihan Bus 京阪バス ^{S}
    - Keihan City Bus 京阪シティバス ^{S}
    - Keihan Kyōto Kōtsū 京阪京都交通 ^{S}
    - Keihan Uji Bus 京阪宇治バス ^{S}
- Kyōto Bus 京都バス ^{S}
- Kyōto Kōtsū 京都交通
- Kyōto Municipal Transportation Bureau (Kyōto City Bus) 京都市交通局 (京都市営バス) ^{S}
- Yasaka Bus ヤサカバス

=== Hyōgo Prefecture ===
- Amagasaki City Transportation Bureau (Amagasaki City Bus) 尼崎市交通局 (尼崎市営バス) ^{S}
  - Amagasaki Transportation Business Promotion 尼崎交通事業振興 ^{S}
- Awaji Kōtsū 淡路交通
- Awaji Taxi 淡路タクシー
- Hakuro Taxi はくろタクシー
- Hankyū Hanshin Holdings Group 阪急阪神ホールディングスグループ
  - Hankyū Denen Bus 阪急田園バス ^{S}
  - Hanshin Bus 阪神バス ^{S}
  - Rokkō Maya Railway 六甲摩耶鉄道
  - Shintetsu Bus 神鉄バス ^{S}
- Honshi Kaikyou Bus 本四海峡バス
- Itami City Transportation Bureau (Itami City Bus) 伊丹市交通局 (伊丹市営バス) ^{S}
- Kōbe Ferry Bus 神戸フェリーバス
- Kōbe Municipal Transportation Bureau (Kōbe City Bus) 神戸市交通局 (神戸市営バス) ^{S}
  - Kōbe City Transportation Promotion 神戸交通振興 ^{S}
- Minato Kankō Bus (Kōbe) みなと観光バス
- Minato Kankō Bus (Minamiawaji) みなと観光バス

These two are unrelated.

- Sanyō Group 山陽グループ
- Sanyō Bus 山陽バス
- Shinki Bus神姫バス ^{Pi}
  - Shinki Green Bus 神姫グリーンバス
  - Shinki Zone Bus神姫ゾーンバス ^{Pi}
  - West Shinki ウエスト神姫
- Zentan Bus 全但バス

=== Nara Prefecture ===
- Kintetsu Group 近鉄グループ
  - Nara Kōtsū 奈良交通 ^{Pi}
    - NC Bus エヌシーバス ^{Pi}
- Yoshino Ōmine Kēburu Bus 吉野大峯ケーブル自動車

=== Shiga Prefecture ===
- Keihan Group 京阪グループ
  - Kojak Kōtsū (Kojak Bus) 江若交通 (江若バス)
- Seibu Group 西武グループ
  - Ohmi Railway 近江鉄道
    - Kokoku Bus 湖国バス
- Shiga Agent System シガ・エージェントシステム
- Shiga Kōtsū 滋賀交通
  - Shiga Bus 滋賀バス
- Teisan Group 帝産グループ
  - Teisan Kankō Bus Shiga 帝産観光バス滋賀
  - Teisan Konan Kōtsū 帝産湖南交通
  - Teisan Taxi Shiga 帝産タクシー滋賀
- Yogo Bus 余呉バス

=== Wakayama Prefecture ===
- Arida Kōtsū 有田交通
- Arida Railway 有田鉄道
- Chūki Bus 中紀バス
- Daijyū Bus 大十バス
- Kintetsu Group 近鉄グループ
  - Meikō Bus 明光バス
- Kōyasan Taxi 高野山タクシー
- Kumano Kōtsū 熊野交通
- Nankai Group 南海グループ
  - Gobō Nankai Bus 御坊南海バス
  - Nankai Rinkan Bus 南海りんかんバス ^{S}
  - Wakayama Bus ^{S} 和歌山バス
    - Wakayama Bus Naga 和歌山バス那賀 ^{S}
- Ryūjin Jidōsha 龍神自動車
- Susami Kôtû すさみ交通

== Chūgoku region ==
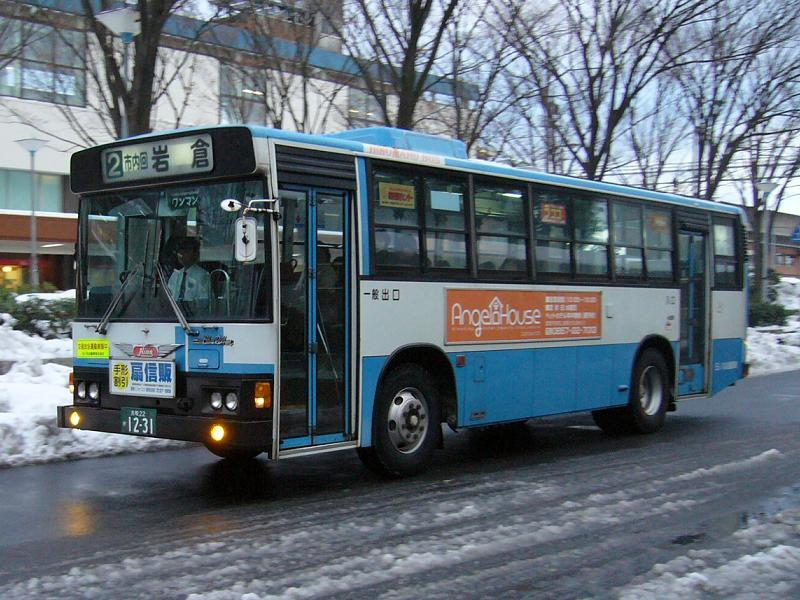
Hinomaru Bus car, Tottori.

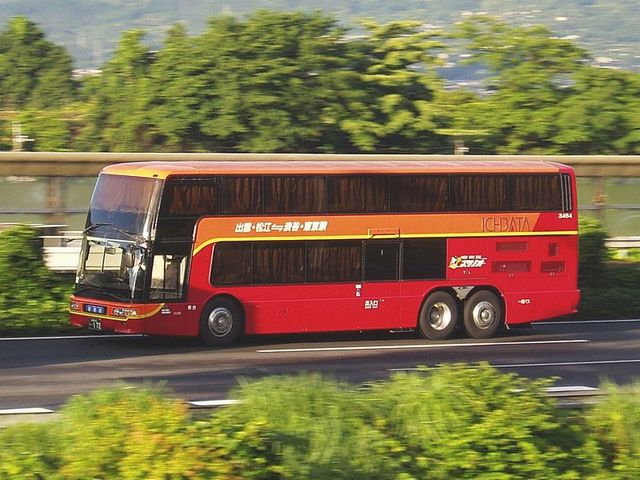
A highway Ichibata Bus car.

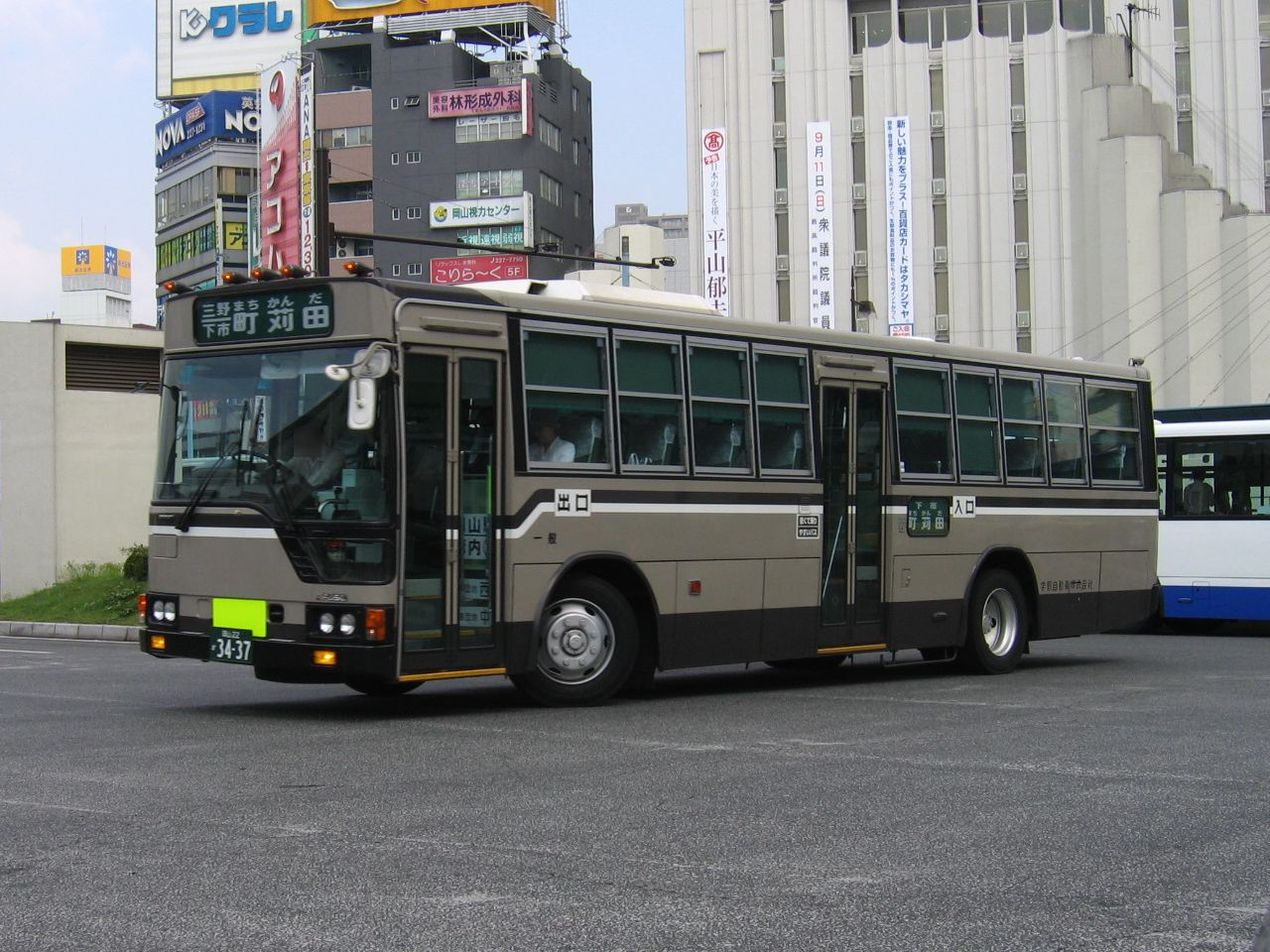
Uno Bus car, Okayama.

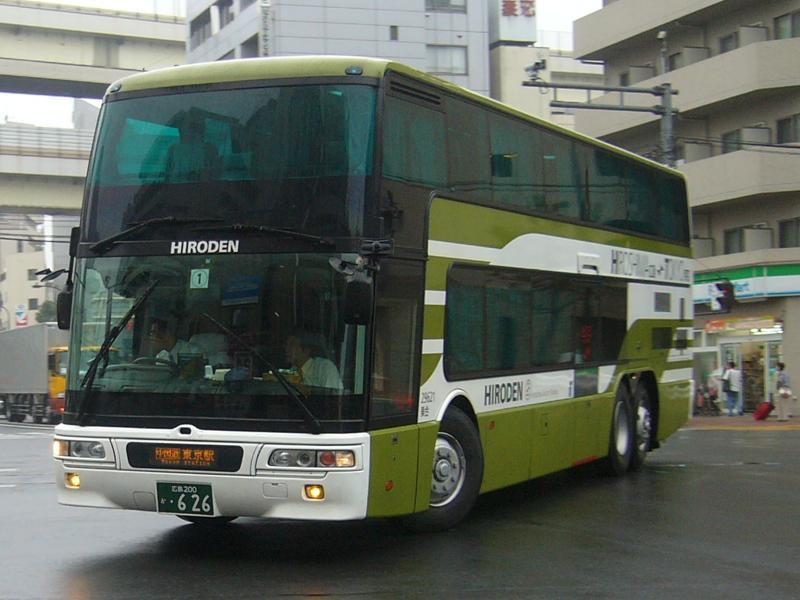
A highway Hiroden Bus car, Hiroshima.

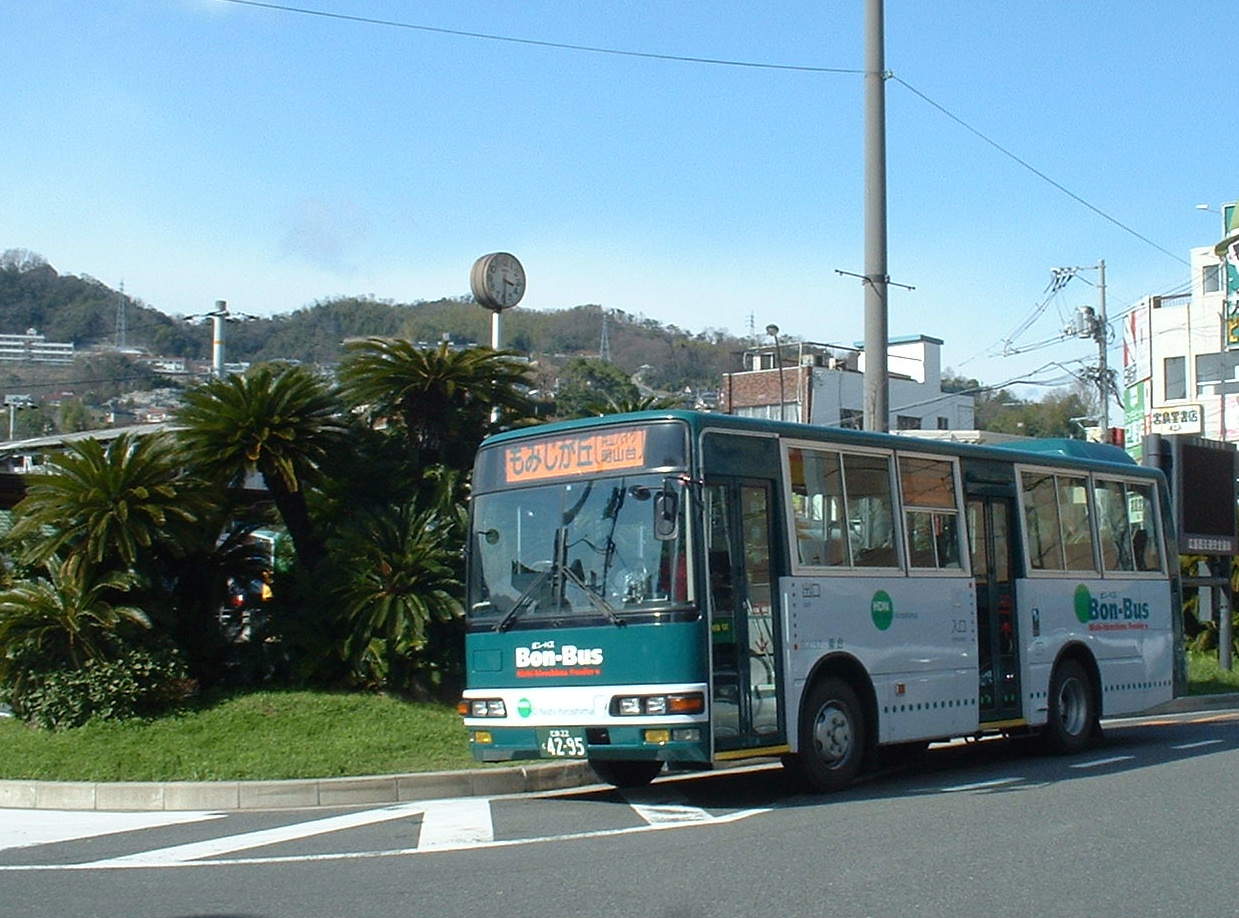
Bon-Bus.

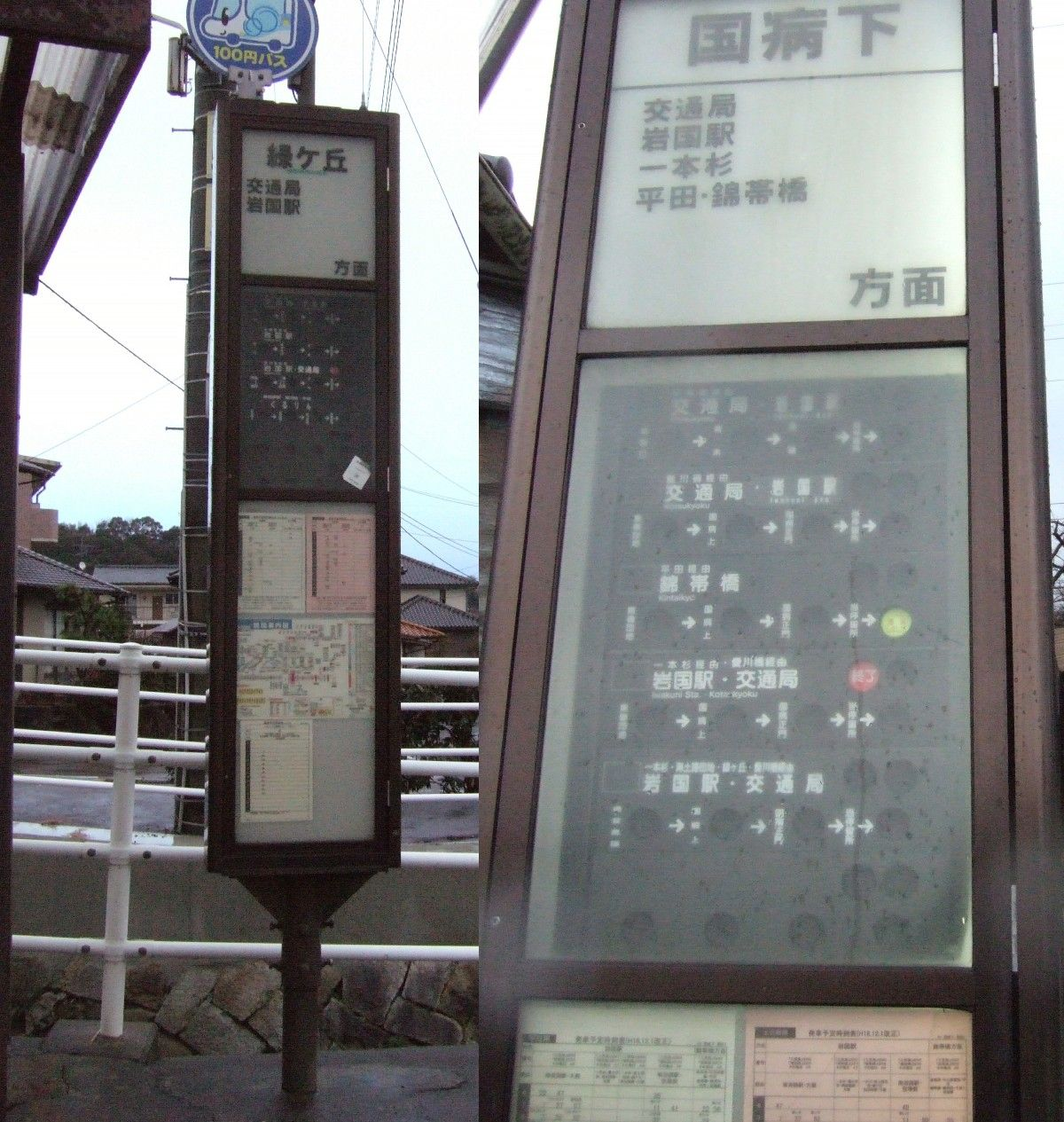
Bus stops with bus location system, Iwakuni City Bus.

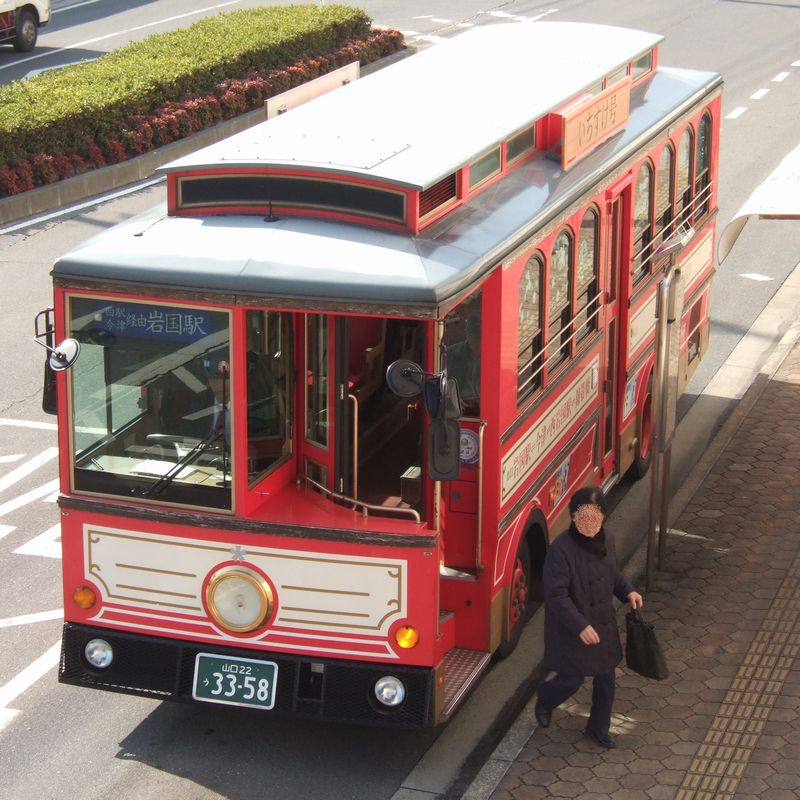
Iwakuni City Bus "Ichisuke".

=== Tottori Prefecture ===
- Hinomaru Bus 日ノ丸自動車 (日ノ丸バス)
  - Hinomaru Hire 日ノ丸ハイヤー
- Nihon Kōtsū (Nikkō Bus) 日本交通
- Tottori Jidōsha (Clover Bus) 鳥取自動車 (クローバーバス)

=== Shimane Prefecture ===
- Hankyū Hanshin Holdings Group 阪急阪神ホールディングスグループ
  - Iwami Kōtsū 石見交通
- Ichibata Group 一畑グループ
  - Ichibata Bus 一畑バス
  - Izumo Ichibata Kōtsū 出雲一畑交通
  - Matsue Ichibata Kōtsū 松江一畑交通
  - Oki Ichibata Kōtsū 隠岐一畑交通
  - Okuizumo Kōtsū 奥出雲交通
- Matsue City Traffic Office (Matsue City Bus) 松江市交通局 (松江市営バス)
- Muikaichi Kōtsū 六日市交通
- Oki Ama Kōtsū 隠岐海士交通
- Oki Kankō 隠岐観光
- Susanoo Kankou スサノオ観光
- Tanimoto Hire 谷本ハイヤー
- Yamato Kankō 大和観光

=== Okayama Prefecture ===
- Arimoto Kankō Bus 有本観光バス
- Chūtetsu Bus 中鉄バス
  - Chūtetsu Mimasaka Bus 中鉄美作バス
  - Sōja Bus (Chūtetsu Sōja Bus) 総社バス (中鉄総社バス)
- Hinase Transportation (Bizen Bus) 日生運輸 (備前バス)
  - Hokushin Bus 北振バス
- Kamo Kankō Bus 加茂観光バス
- Katsumada Kankō Bus 勝間田観光バス
- Minagi Kōtsū 美袋交通
- Rose Kankoh (Rose Bus) ロウズ観光 (ロウズバス)
- Ryōbi Holdings (Ryōbi Bus) 両備ホールディングス (両備バス)
  - Ikasa Bus Company 井笠バスカンパニー (井笠バス.C)
  - Okayama Electric Tramway (Okaden Bus) 岡山電気軌道 (岡電バス)
  - Okayama Kōtsū 岡山交通
  - Okayama Taxi 岡山タクシー
  - Tōbi Bus 東備バス
- Shimotsui Dentetsu (Shimoden Bus) 下津井電鉄 (下電バス)
  - Bihoku Bus 備北バス
  - Shimoden Tour Service シモデンツアーサービス
- Toyosawa Kōtsū 豊沢交通
- Uno Bus 宇野自動車 (宇野バス)

=== Hiroshima Prefecture ===
- Angel Cab エンゼルキャブ
- Anzen Taxi 安全タクシー
- Chiyoda Taxi 千代田タクシー
- Chūgoku Bus 中国バス
- Daiichi Taxi 第一タクシー
- Hamadaya Taxi 浜田屋タクシー
- Hiroshima Bus 広島バス
- Hiroshima Electric Railway (Hiroden Bus) 広島電鉄 (広電バス)
  - Bihoku Kōtsū 備北交通
  - Geiyō Bus 芸陽バス
  - HD Nishi Hiroshima (Bon-Bus) エイチ・ディー西広島 (ボン・バス)
- Hiroshima Kōtsū 広島交通
  - Hirokō Kankō 広交観光
- Honshi Bus Kaihatsu 本四バス開発
- Innoshima Unyu (Innoshima Bus) 因の島運輸 (因の島バス)
- Iwami Tour イワミツアー
- JR Group JRグループ
  - Chūgoku JR Bus 中国ジェイアールバス
- Jūban Kōtsū 十番交通
- Kake Kōtsū 加計交通
- Mibu Kōtsū 壬生交通
- Miyajima Kōtsū 宮島交通
- Nōmi Bus 能美バス
- Ōasa Kōtsū (Hope Bus) 大朝交通 (ホープバス)
- Onomichi Bus おのみちバス
- Ōtake Kōtsū Taxi 大竹交通タクシー
- Ōtake Taxi 大竹タクシー
- Saijō Kōtsū (Rainbow Bus) 西城交通 (レインボーバス)
- Saiki Kōtsū 佐伯交通
- Sandankyō Kōtsū 三段峡交通
- Sanyō Bus さんようバス
- Sasaki Kankō ささき観光
- Setouchi Sankō 瀬戸内産交
- Shōwa Taxi 昭和タクシー
- SK Corporation 総合企画コーポレーション
- Tomotetsudō (Tomotetsu Bus) 鞆鉄道 (トモテツバス)
- Toyohira Kōtsū 豊平交通
- Tsuda Kōtsū 津田交通
- Yae Taxi 八重タクシー
- Yaguchi Taxi やぐちタクシー
- Yasuura Kōtsū 安浦交通

=== Yamaguchi Prefecture ===
- Funaki Railway (Sentetsu Bus) 船木鉄道 (船鉄バス)
- Iwakuni Bus いわくにバス
- Kintetsu Group 近鉄グループ
  - Bōchō Kōtsū (Bōchō Bus) 防長交通 (防長バス)
- Sanden Kōtsū サンデン交通
  - Blue Line Kōtsū ブルーライン交通
- Ube City Transportation Bureau (Ube City Bus) 宇部市交通局 (宇部市営バス)

== Shikoku region ==
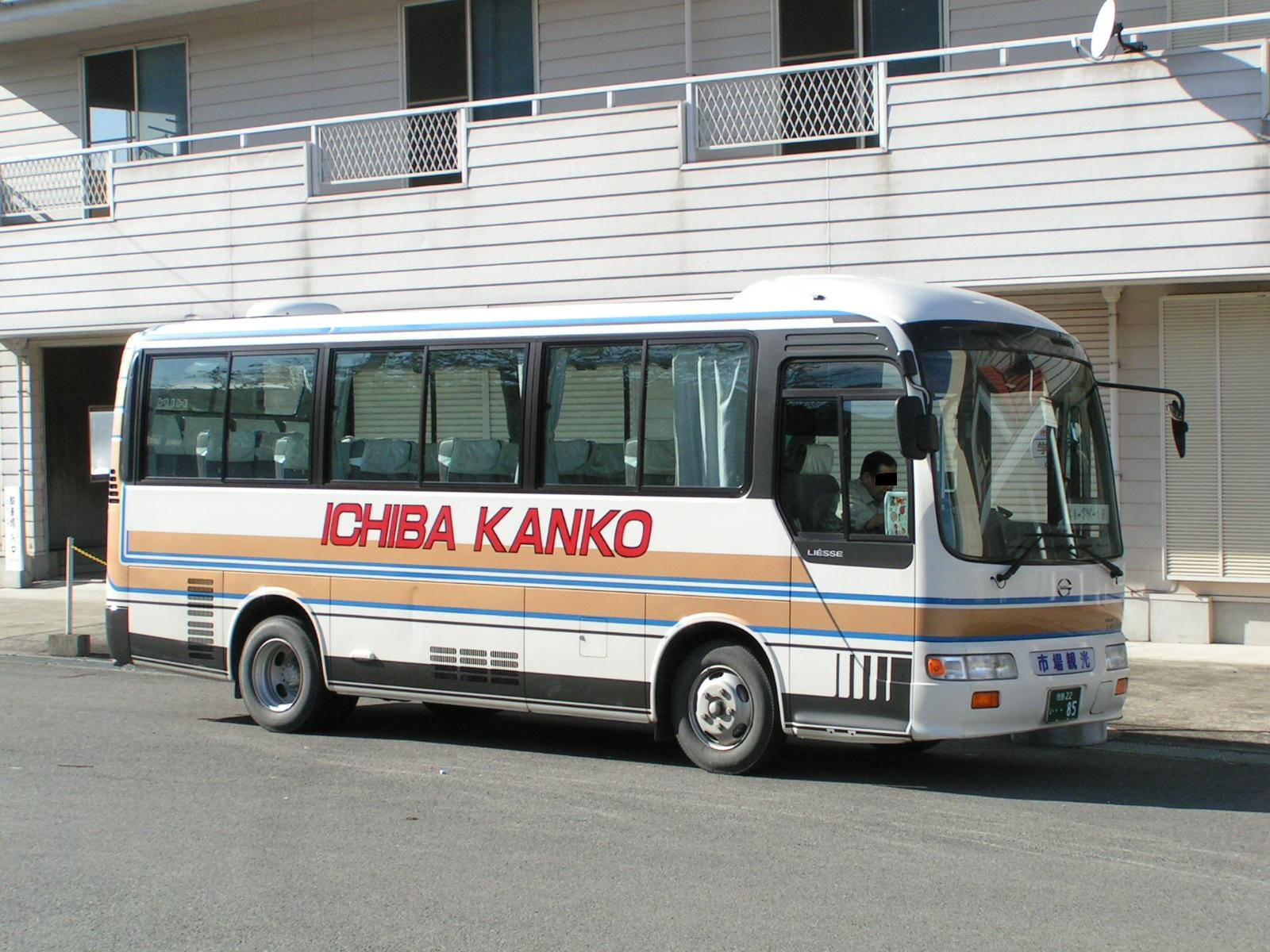
Ichiba Kōtsū bus.

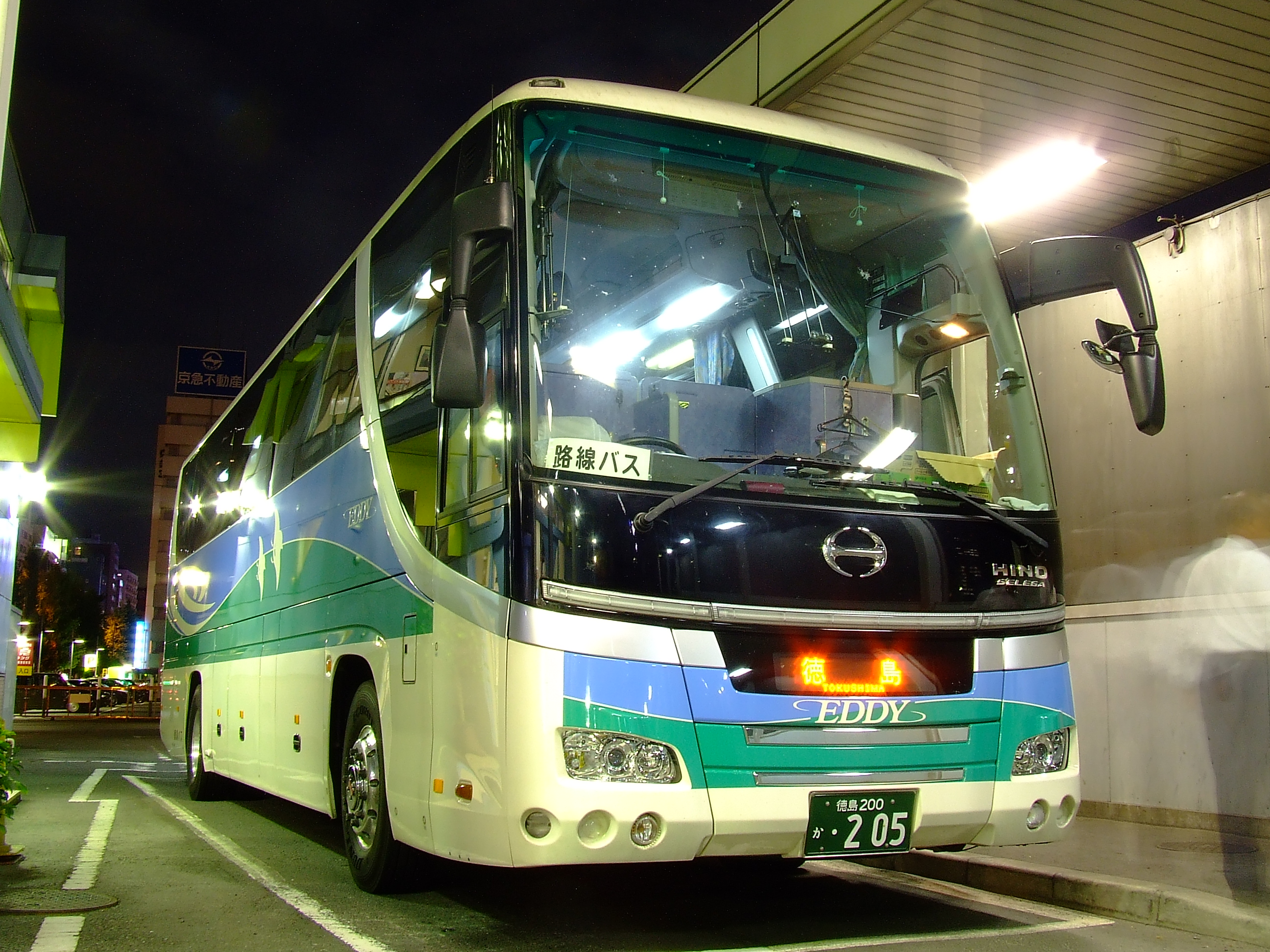
A highway Tokushima Bus car.

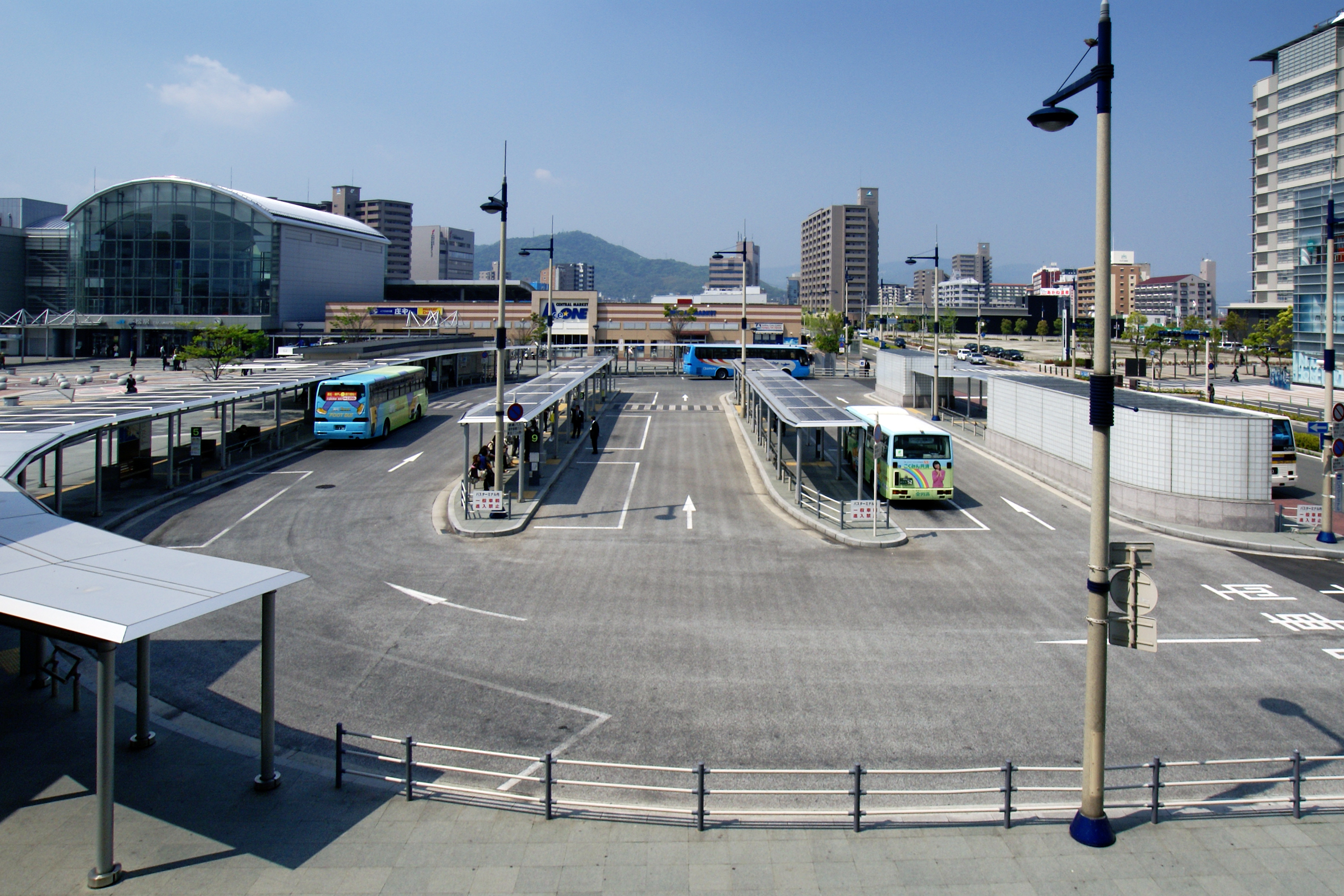
Takamatsu Station Bus Terminal, Kotoden Bus and others.

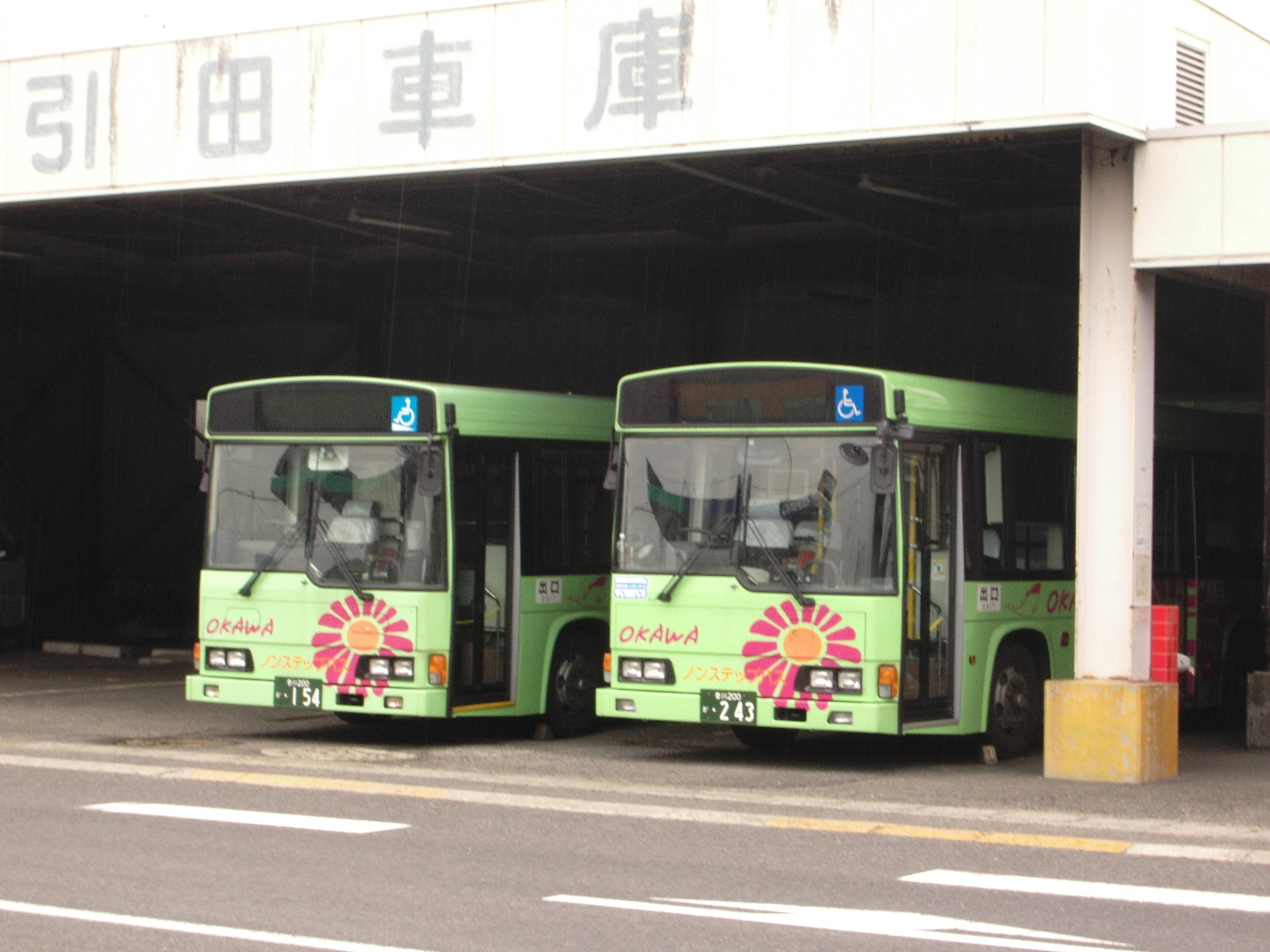
Ōkawa Bus.

=== Tokushima Prefecture ===
- Ichiba Kōtsū 市場交通
- Kotoden Group ことでんグループ
  - Tokushima Seibu Kōtsū 徳島西部交通
- Mima Kankō Bus 美馬観光バス
- Nankai Group 南海グループ
  - Tokushima Bus 徳島バス
    - Shikoku Kōtsū 四国交通
    - Tokushima Bus Anan 徳島バス阿南
    - Tokushima Bus Nanbu 徳島バス南部
- Tokushima City Transportation Bureau (Tokushima City Bus) 徳島市交通局 (徳島市営バス)

=== Kagawa Prefecture ===
- JR Group JRグループ
  - JR Shikoku Bus ジェイアール四国バス
- Kotoden Group ことでんグループ
  - Kotoden Bus ことでんバス
  - Shikoku Kousoku Bus 四国高速バス
- Kotohira Bus 琴平バス (コトバス)
- Kotosan Corporation (Kotosan Bus) 琴平参宮電鉄 (琴参バス)
- Ōkawa Bus 大川自動車
- Onigashima Kankō Jidōsha 鬼ヶ島観光自動車

The smallest operator in Japan, with 2 buses.

- Shōdoshima Bus 小豆島バス
- Takamatsu Express (Foot Bus) 高松エクスプレス (フットバス)

=== Ehime Prefecture ===
- Iyo Railway 伊予鉄道
  - Iyotetsu Nanyo Bus 伊予鉄南予バス
- Kounan Bus 肱南観光バス
- Setouchi Bus 瀬戸内運輸 (せとうちバス)
  - Setouchi Shūsō Bus せとうち周桑バス
  - Setonaikai Kōtsū 瀬戸内海交通
- Setouchi Shimanami Leading 瀬戸内しまなみリーディング
- Uwajima Bus 宇和島自動車 (宇和島バス)

=== Kōchi Prefecture ===
- Kōch Ekimae Kankō 高知駅前観光
- Kōnan Kankō Jidōsha 高南観光自動車
- Kuroiwa Kankō 黒岩観光
- Reihoku Kankō Zidōsha 嶺北観光自動車
- Tosaden Kōtsū とさでん交通
  - Kenkō Hokubu Kōtsū 県交北部交通
  - Kōchi Kōryō Kōtsū 高知高陵交通
  - Kōchi Seinan Kōtsū 高知西南交通
  - Kōchi Tōbu Kōtsū 高知東部交通

== Kyūshū region ==
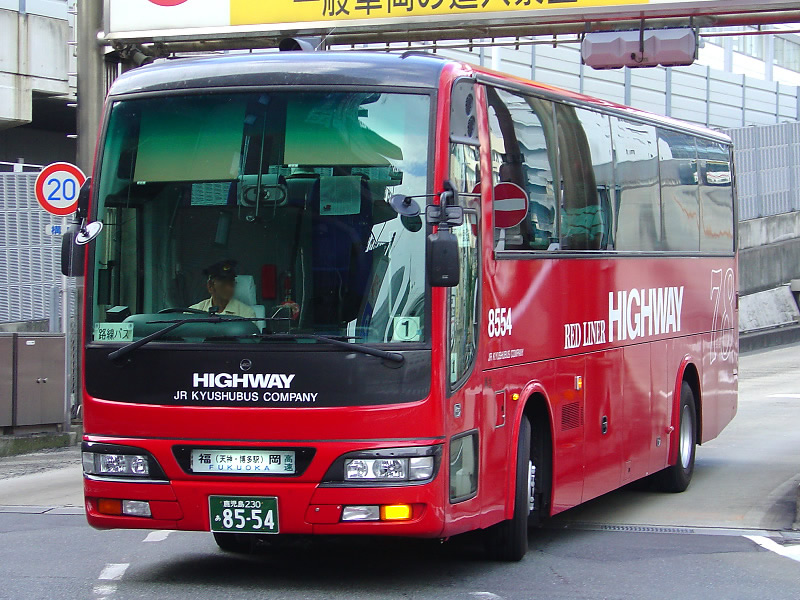
A highway JR Kyūshū Bus car.

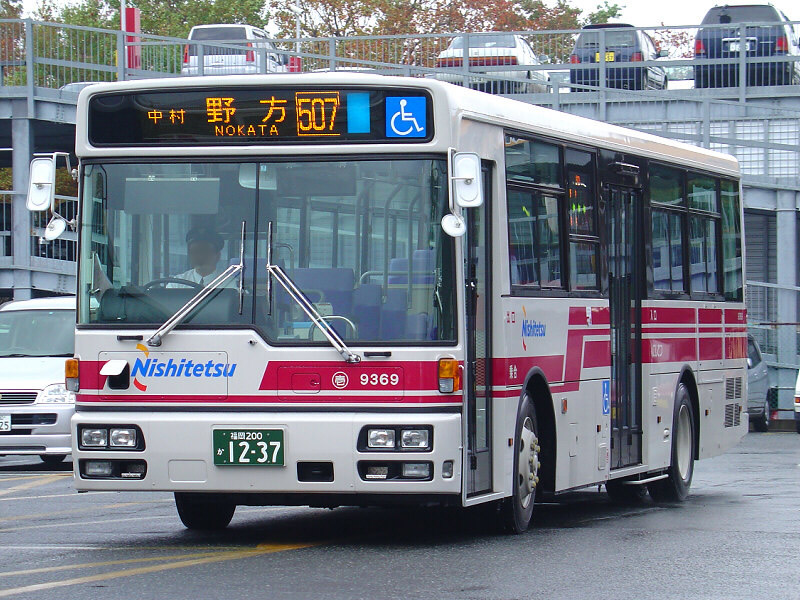
A typical local Nishitetsu Bus car, Fukuoka.

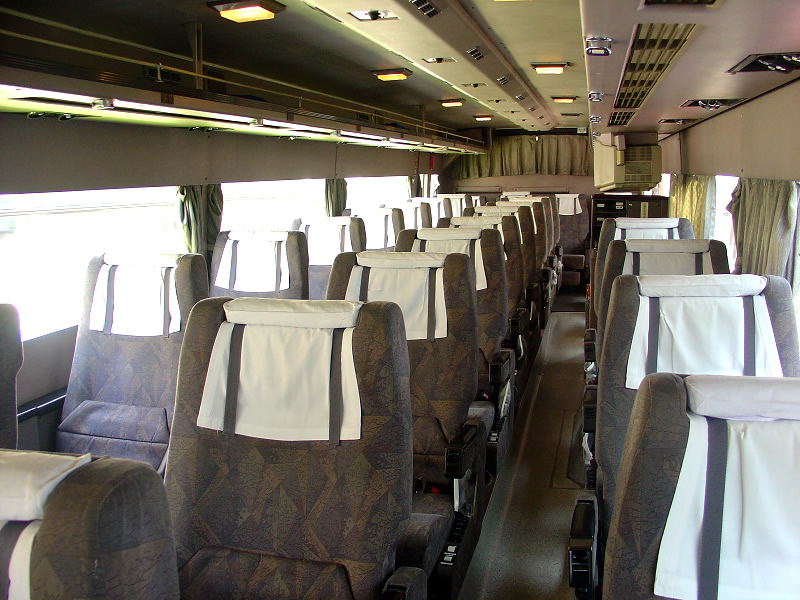
Three row seats of highway Nishitetsu Bus car.

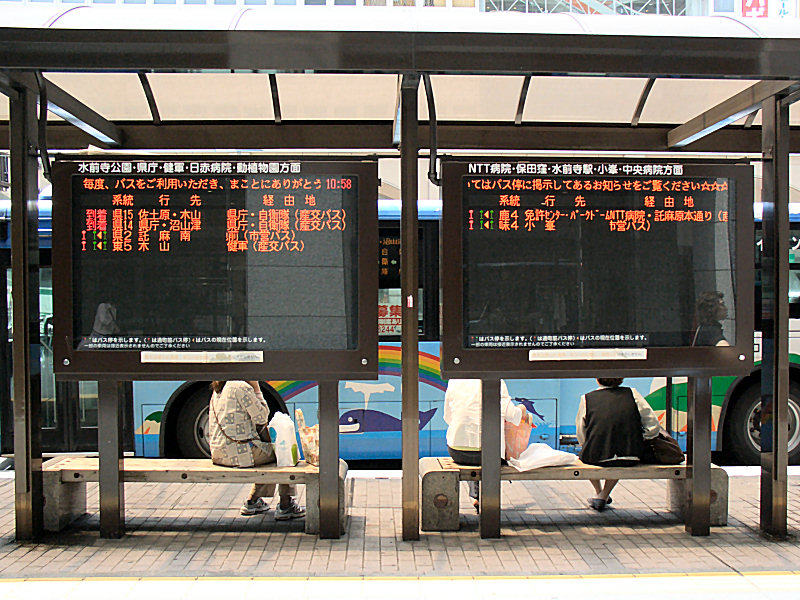
Bus location boards at a bus stop, Kumamoto City Bus.

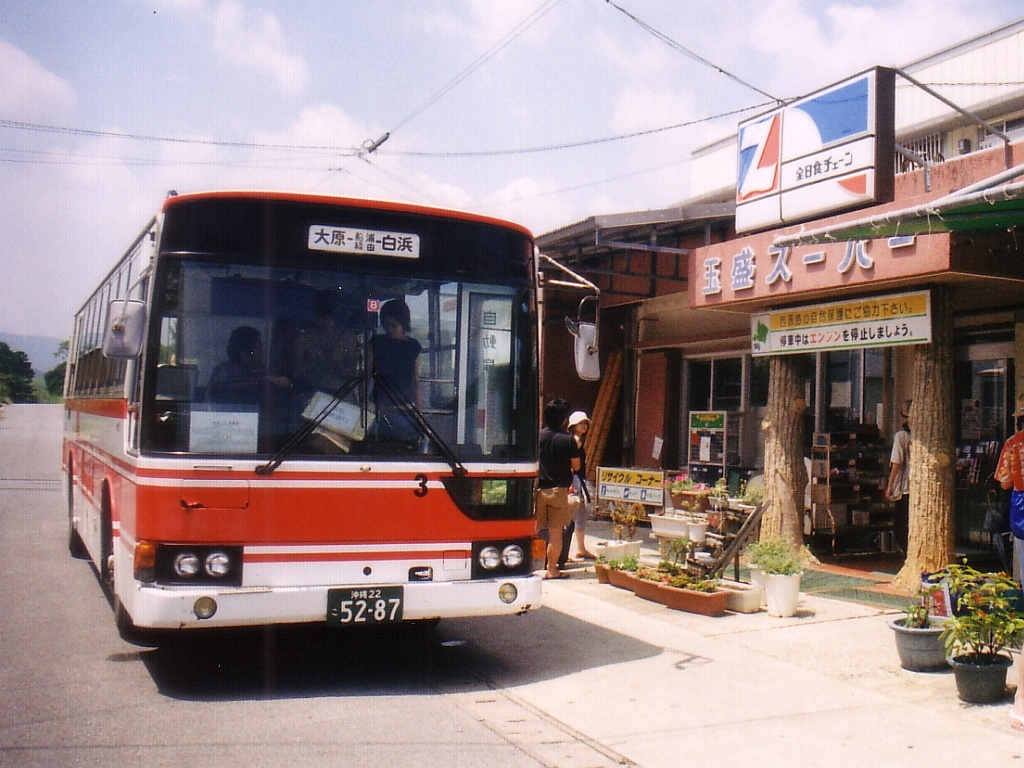
Iriomotejima Kōtsū Bus on Iriomote Island, the southernmost bus operator in Japan.

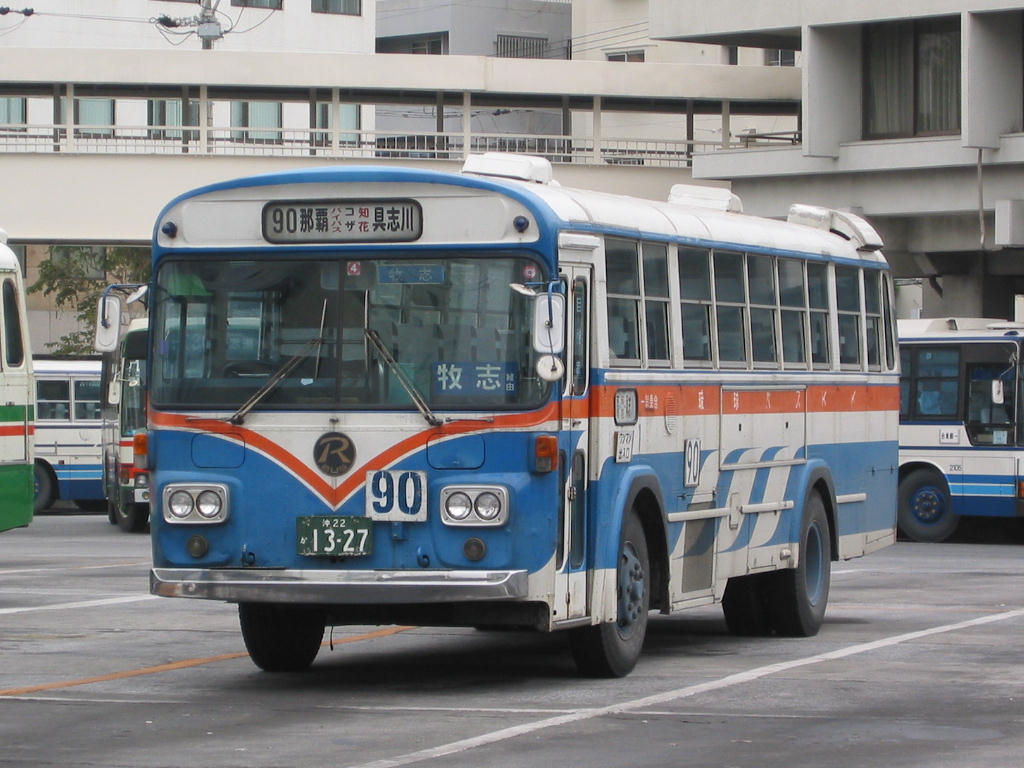
Ryūkyū Bus Kōtsū car at Naha Bus Terminal.

=== Fukuoka Prefecture ===
- Amagi Kankō Bus 甘木観光バス
- Chikuhō Kankō Bus 筑豊観光バス
- Horikawa Bus 堀川バス
- JR Group JRグループ
  - JR Kyūshū Bus ジェイアール九州バス
- Kitakyūshū City Transportation Bureau (Kitakyūshū City Bus) 北九州市交通局 (北九州市営バス)
- Nishitetsu Group 西鉄グループ
  - Kyūshū Kyūkō Bus 九州急行バス
  - Nishi-Nippon Railroad (Nishitetsu Bus) 西日本鉄道 (西鉄バス)
    - Nishitetsu Bus Chikuhō 西鉄バス筑豊
    - Nishitetsu Bus Futsukaichi 西鉄バス二日市
    - Nishitetsu Bus Kitakyūshū 西鉄バス北九州
    - Nishitetsu Bus Kurume 西鉄バス久留米
    - Nishitetsu Bus Munakata 西鉄バス宗像
    - Nishitetsu Bus Ōmuta 西鉄バス大牟田
    - Nishitetsu Highway Bus 西鉄高速バス
    - Nishitetsu Kankō Bus 西鉄観光バス

Nishitetsu Bus is the largest operator in Japan. It owns the fleet of 2,083 buses, or 3,100 by the entire group.

- Shōwa Bus 昭和自動車 (昭和バス)
- Taiyō Kōtsū 太陽交通
- Techno Kankō Bus テクノ観光バス
- Ukico ウキコ

=== Saga Prefecture ===
- Nishitetsu Group 西鉄グループ
  - Nishitetsu Bus Saga 西鉄バス佐賀
- Saga City Transportation Bureau (Saga Shiei Bus) 佐賀市交通局 (佐賀市営バス)
- Yūtoku Motor 祐徳自動車

=== Nagasaki Prefecture ===
- Gotō Motor (Gotō Bus) 五島自動車 (五島バス)
- Iki Kōtsū 壱岐交通
- Ikitsuki Motor (Ikitsuki Bus) 生月自動車 (生月バス)
- Maruhama Sangyō (Narujima Bus) 丸濱産業 (奈留島バス)
- Nagasaki Motor Bus (Nagasaki Bus) 長崎自動車 (長崎バス)
  - Saikai Kōtsū さいかい交通
- Ojika Kōtsū 小値賀交通
- Ōkawa Rikuun (Hirado Kankō Bus) 大川陸運 (平戸観光バス)
- Saihi Motor (Saihi Bus) 西肥自動車 (西肥バス)
- Sasebo City Transportation Bureau (Sasebo City Bus) 佐世保市交通局 (佐世保市営バス)
  - Sasebo Bus させぼバス
- Shimabara Railway (Shimatetsu Bus) 島原鉄道 (島鉄バス)
- Transportation Bureau of Nagasaki Prefecture (Nagasaki Ken-ei Bus) 長崎県交通局 (長崎県営バス)
  - Nagasaki Ken-ou Bus 長崎県央バス
- Tsushima Kōtsū 対馬交通
- Uku Kankō Bus 宇久観光バス
- YOKARO YOKARO

=== Kumamoto Prefecture ===
- Kyūshū Sankō Bus 九州産交バス
  - Sankō Bus 産交バス
- Kumamoto Electric Railway 熊本電気鉄道
- Kumamoto Toshi Bus 熊本都市バス
- Kumamoto Bus 熊本バス

=== Ōita Prefecture ===
- Nishitetsu Group 西鉄グループ
  - Hita Bus 日田バス
  - Kamenoi Bus 亀の井バス
- Ōita Bus 大分バス
  - Kyūshin Kōtsū 臼津交通
  - Ōno Kōtsū 大野交通
  - Takeda Kōtsū 竹田交通
- Ōita Kōtsū 大分交通
  - Daikō Hokubu Bus 大交北部バス
  - Kunisaki Kankō Bus 国東観光バス
  - Kusu Kankō Bus 玖珠観光バス

=== Miyazaki Prefecture ===
- Hakkō Travel ハッコートラベル
- Iwasaki Group いわさきグループ
  - Sanshū Motor 三州自動車
- Sun Marine Tourサンマリンツアー
- Miyazaki Kōtsū 宮崎交通
- Yamaguchi Transportation (Mito Kankō Bus) 山口運送 (美登観光バス)

=== Kagoshima Prefecture ===
- A" Line マルエーフェリー
- Daiwa Bus 大和バス
- Iwasaki Group いわさきグループ
  - Amami Iwasaki Sangyō 奄美岩崎産業
  - Iwasaki Bus Network いわさきバスネットワーク
  - Kagoshima Kōtsū 鹿児島交通
  - Tanegashima Yakushima Kōtsū 種子島・屋久島交通
- Kagoshima City Transportation Bureau (Kagoshima City Bus) 鹿児島市交通局 (鹿児島市営バス)
- Kakeroma Bus 加計呂麻バス
- Michinoshima Kōtsū 道の島交通
- Minami Kyūshū Kankō Bus 南九州観光バス
- Minami Rikuun (Minami Bus) 南陸運 (南バス)
- Nangoku Kōtsū 南国交通
- Okinoerabu Bus Enterprises (Oki Bus) 沖永良部バス企業団 (沖バス)
- Satsumasendai City Industrial Economy Division Commerce And Industry Promotion Section (Satsumasendai City Bus) 薩摩川内市産業経済部商工振興課 (薩摩川内市営バス)
- Tokunoshima Sōgō Rikuun (Sōgō Bus) 徳之島総合陸運 (総合バス)

=== Okinawa Prefecture ===
- Azuma Un'yu (Azuma Bus) 東運輸 (東バス)
- Hokubu Kankō Bus 北部観光バス
- Iejima Kankō Bus 伊江島観光バス
- Iriomotejima Kōtsū 西表島交通

The southernmost operator.

- Karry Kankō カリー観光
- Kohama Kōtsū コハマ交通
- Kyōwa Bus 共和バス
- Miyako Kyōei Bus 宮古協栄バス
- Naha Bus 那覇バス
- Okinawa Bus 沖縄バス
- Ryūkyū Bus Kōtsū 琉球バス交通
- Tōyō Bus 東陽バス
- Yachiyo Bus Taxi 八千代バス・タクシー
- Yonaguni Kōtsū ヨナグニ交通

== See also ==
- List of bus operating companies
- ja:日本のコミュニティバス一覧 (List of community buses in Japan)
- ja:日本のバス (Buses in Japan)
- List of railway companies in Japan
- List of defunct railway companies in Japan
- List of aerial lifts in Japan
