= Michinori Holdings =

Holding company based in Tokyo, Japan

Michinori Holdings, Inc.
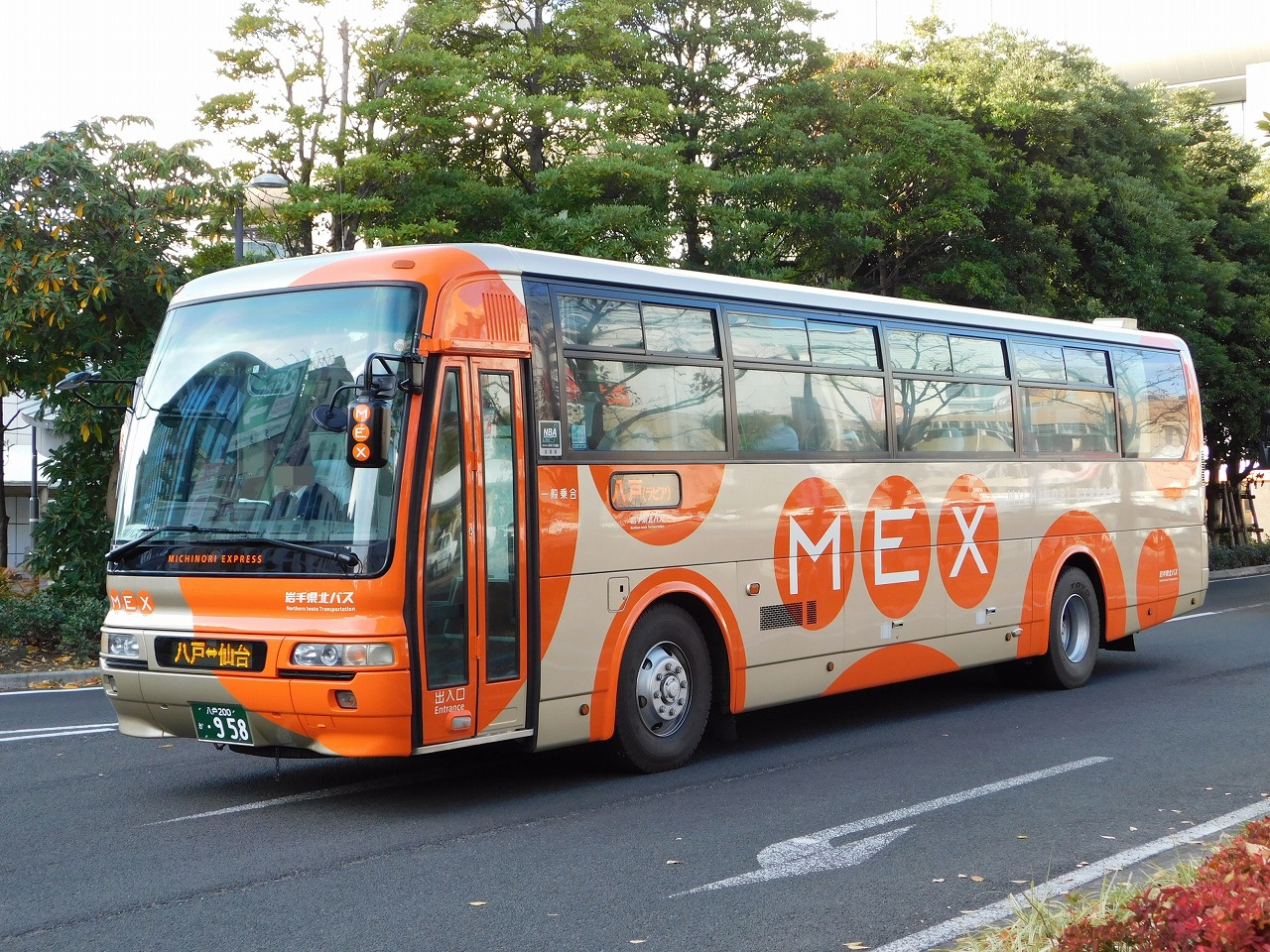
- MEX of Northern Iwate Transportation, a subsidiary of Michinori Holdings
- Native name: みちのりホールディングス
- Romanized name: Michinori Hōrudingusu Kabushiki-gaisha
- Type: Public K.K.
- Founded: March 16, 2009; 17 years ago
- Headquarters: 1-9-2 Marunouchi, Chiyoda-ku, Tokyo (東京都千代田区丸の内1-9-2 グラントウキョウサウスタワー8階), Japan
- Key people: Jun Matsumoto
- Owner: Industrial Growth Platform, Inc.
- Number of employees: 4,900
- Parent: Industrial Growth Platform, Inc.
- Subsidiaries: Fukushima Transportation; Shonan Monorail; Sado Kisen; Aizu Bus; Kanto Transportation; Northern Iwate Transportation; Ibaraki Kotsu; Higashinihon Kotsu
- Website: www.michinori.co.jp/index.html

Michinori Holdings, Inc. (株式会社みちのりホールディングス, Kabushiki-gaisha Michinori Hōrudingusu) is a holding company headquartered in Chiyoda, Tokyo, and a wholly owned subsidiary of Industrial Growth Platform, Inc. Michinori Holdings rehabilitates deficit companies which have so much liability that they cannot act as an administrator of assets. It manages them by acquiring and holding their shares until they return to financial stability and viability.

As of 2022, Michinori Holdings currently holds and operates subsidiaries in the transportation sector, including bus, railway, and monorail companies. They are:

- Fukushima Transportation, since 2008
  - Aizu Bus, since 2011 (merged into Fukushima Transportation in 2026)
- Shonan Monorail, since 2015
- Sado Kisen (ferry company), since 2022
- Kanto Transportation, since 2012
- Northern Iwate Transportation, since 2010
- Ibaraki Kotsu (bus company), since 2009
- Higashinihon Kotsu (bus company), since 2018

Some expressway bus routes operated by affiliated companies of Michinori Holdings are named "Michinori Express" (MEX), designed by Yasuyuki Kawanishi, who also designed West Express Ginga.

== Aizu Bus ==
Aizu Bus
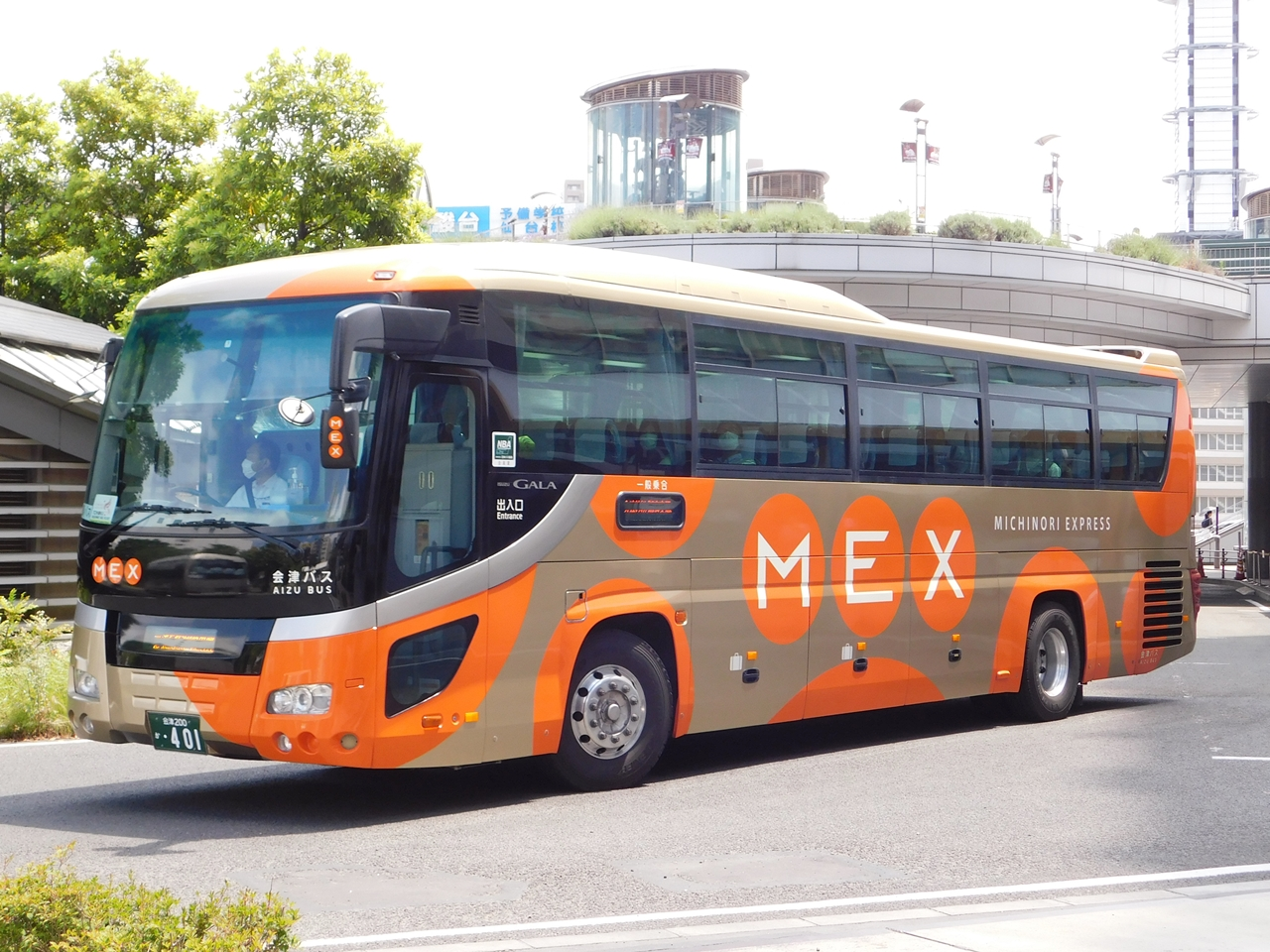
- Hino Selega (used for many highway buses)
- Parent: Michinori Holdings
- Founded: 21 March 1943
- Headquarters: 195 Byakkocho, Aizu-wakamatsu, Fukushima, Japan (福島県会津若松市白虎町195)
- Service area: Fukushima
- Service type: Bus
- Routes: Routemap
- Website: Aizu Bus (in Japanese)

The Aizu Bus Co., Ltd. (会津乗合自動車株式会社, Aizu Noriai Jidōsha Kabushiki-gaisha) was a wholly owned subsidiary of Michinori Holdings. Tobu Group had haven shares of this company until 2011. In 1 April 2026, Aizu Bus merged into Fukushima Transportation and renamed Fukushima Transportation Aizu Office. But, after renaming, remain Aizu Bus as a nickname.

Its subsidiaries include Aizu Travel Service and Aizu Bus/Auto Service. It also owns Aizu Taxi.

=== Outline ===
Aizu Bus Company was established in 1943. It operates bus routes around Aizuwakamatsu in Fukushima Prefecture, many of which are based at Aizu-Tajima Station, Aizukōgen-Ozeguchi Station, and Aizu-Wakamatsu Station. Service area has many tourist spots, including Ōuchi-juku, Tō-no-Hetsuri, Aizuwakamatsu Castle, Lake Inawashiro, Mount Bandai, and Oze National Park.

Its headquarters are located at 195 Byakkocho, Aizuwakamatsu. Until 2011, the company also had a headquarters with Tobu Railway in Oshiage, Sumida, Tokyo.

=== History ===
- 21 March 1943 – Company was established. Later that year, due to unification during World War II, additional routes were transferred to it, including those of Kihan Motor.
- December 1953 – Transferred bus routes between Aizu-Tajima Station and Kinugawaonsen Station from Tobu Railway
- 10 July – "Aizu-Wakamatsu – Koriyama – Iwaki Line" was operated as "limited express" with Fukushima Transportation and Joban Kotsu Motor
- 9 October 1987 – Discontinued bus routes between Aizu-Tajima and Kinugawaonsen due to opening of Yagan Railway.
- 20 January 1996 – "Aizu-Wakamatsu – Koriyama – Iwaki Line" was operated as "Expressway bus" and ran via Joban Expressway
- 24 May 1996 – Commenced operating Low Emission Bus between Aizu-Tajima Station and Oze National Park
- 2 October 1997 – Commenced operating "Aizu-Wakamatsu – Niigata Line" as "Expressway bus" with Niigata Kotsu
- 1 October 2009 – Aizu Taxi merged into Aizu Bus
- 2 December 2010 – Received support from "Regional Economy Vitalization Corporation of Japan"
- 2 August 2013 – "Regional Economy Vitalization Corporation of Japan" transferred its shares of Aizu Bus Company to Michinori Holdings. On 30 August, the transfer was completed, and since then, the bus company has belonged to Michinori Holdings.
- 1 April 2026 - Aizu Bus Co., Ltd merged into Fukushima Transportation that belonged to Michinoti Holdings.

=== Bus routes ===
Routemap

Aizu Bus – Highway Buses
| Name | Stops | Note |
|---|---|---|
| Yumekaido Aizu Line | Aizu-Wakamatsu Station・Koriyama Station・Ikebukuro Station・Shinjuku Highway Bus Terminal | |
| Aizu-Wakamatsu – Sendai Line | Aizu-Wakamatsu Station・Koriyama Station・Fukushima Station・Sendai Station (Miyagi) | |
| Aizu-Wakamatsu – Niigata Line | Aizu-Wakamatsu Station・Kitakata Station・Niitsu Station・Niigata Station | operates with Niigata Kotsu |
| Aizu-Wakamatsu – Fukushima – Sendai Airport Line | Aizu-Wakamatsu Station・Koriyama Station・Fukushima Station・Sendai Airport | |
| Kitakata – Koriyama Line | Kitakata Office・Shiokawa Green Plaza・Koriyama Women's University・Koriyama Station | |
| Aizu-Wakamatsu – Nozawa Line | Aizu-Wakamatsu Station・Kitakata Station・Nozawa Station | |
| Aizu-Wakamatsu – Ouchijuku – To no Hetsuri Line | Aizu-Wakamatsu Station・Ouchijuku・To no Hetsuri・Aizu-Shimogo Station・Shin-Shirakawa Station・Shirakawa Station | operates with Fukushima Transportation |
| Urabandai – Tokyo Line | Urabandai Kogen・Lake Goshiki・Tokyo Station・Haneda Airport | |

=== Further reading ===
- Story of Aizu Bus
- Story of Aizu Bus

== Kanto Transportation ==
Kanto Transportation, Inc.
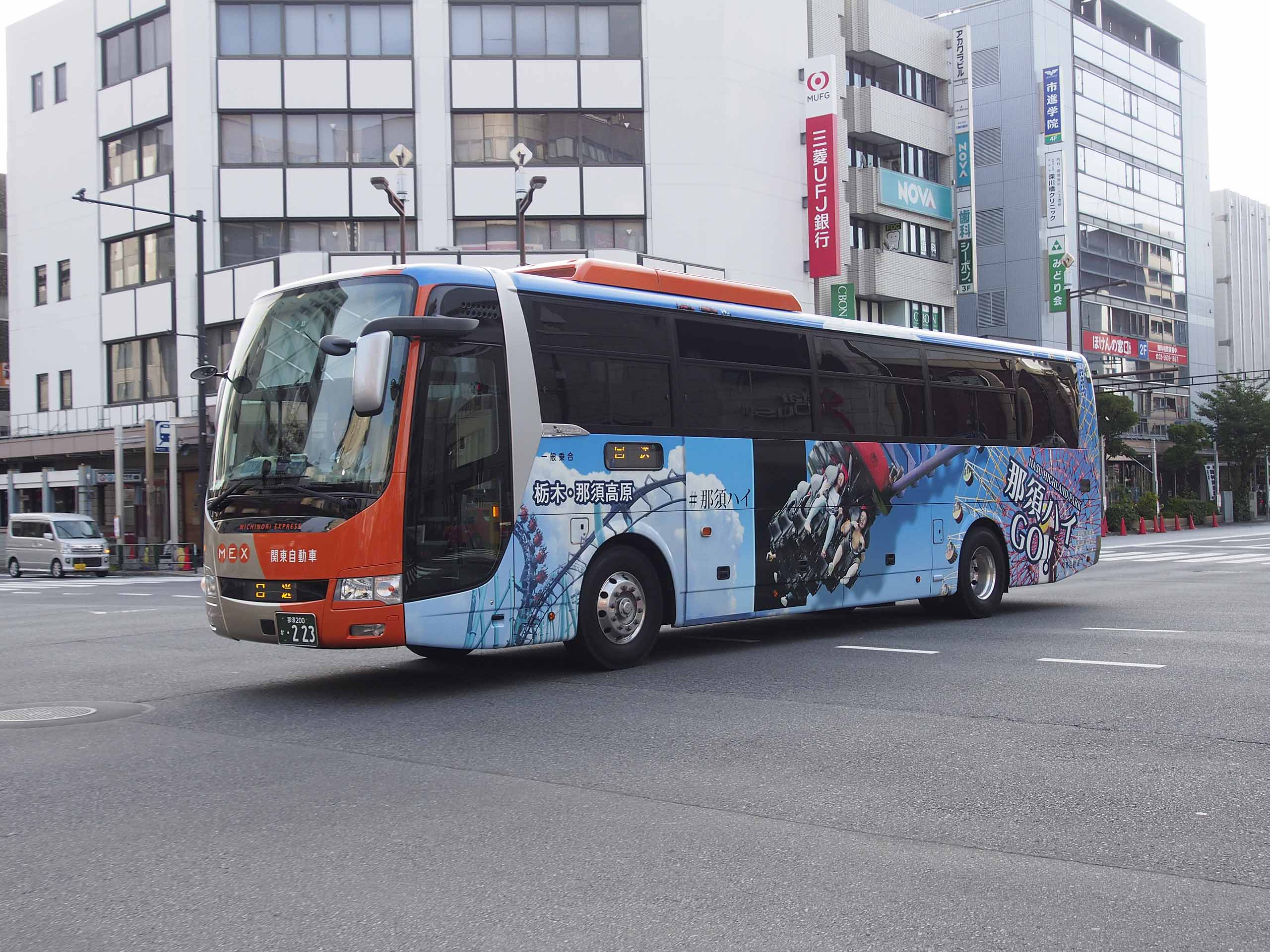
- Mitsubishi Fuso Aero Ace
- Parent: Michinori Holdings
- Founded: 8 May 1927
- Headquarters: 4-25-5 Yanase, Utsunomiya, Tochigi, Japan (栃木県宇都宮市簗瀬四丁目25番5号)
- Service area: Tochigi
- Service type: Bus
- Routes: Route bus map Expressway bus map
- Chief executive: Gen Yoshida
- Website: Kanto Bus (in Japanese)

Kanto Transportation, Inc. (関東自動車株式会社, Kantō Jidōsha Kabushiki-gaisha) is a wholly owned subsidiary of Michinori Holdings.

=== Outline ===
The bus company was established as Kanto Motor LLC in 1923. After acquiring other companies, it changed to Kanto Transportation, Inc. on 8 May 1927. In 2004, the company requested and received management support from Industrial Revitalization Corporation of Japan due to financial difficulties. This company belonged to Jay Coach (an affiliated company of Jay Will Partners) until 2012, when it was transferred to Michinori Holdings.

Kanto Transportation acquired Toya Kotsu on 1 October 2018. Additionally, this company capitalizes Utsunomiya Light Rail at 11%.

Its headquarters are located at 4-25-5 Yanase, Utsunomiya, Tochigi Prefecture.

=== Bus routes ===
Kanto Transportation – Expressway Buses
| Name | Stops | Note |
|---|---|---|
| Maronnier | (Narita Line via Sano) Yanagida Shako・Utsunomiya Station・Sano Shintoshi Bus Terminal・Sakai-Koga BT・Narita Airport | |
| Maronnier | (Narita Line via Mooka) Nikko Station・Kanuma IC・Utsunomiya Station・Mooka・Narita Airport | |
| Maronnier | (Haneda Line) Yanagida Shako・Utsunomiya Station・Sano Shintoshi Bus Terminal・Haneda Airport | |
| Mapple | Ota Station (Gunma)・Sakai-Koga BT・Narita Airport | |
| Salvia | Kiryu Station・Ashikagashi Station・Sano Shintoshi Bus Terminal・Sakai-Koga BT・Narita Airport | |
| Horse chestnut tree | Yanagida Shako・Utsunomiya Station・Kyoto Station・Tennoji Station | |
| Kita-Kanto Liner | (Mito Line) Utsunomiya Station・Akatsuka Station (Ibaraki)・Mito Station (Ibaraki) | |

Kanto Transportation – Community Buses
| Name | Stops | Note |
|---|---|---|
| KIBUNA | Utsunomiya Station | |
| Kamigochi Bus | | |
| Ashikaga Municipal Bus | Irinagusa・Ashikagashi Station・Ashikaga Station | |
| Tochigi Municipal Bus | Tochigi Station・Shin-Tochigi Station・Tōbu Kanasaki Station・Oyama Nishi Highschool | |
| RI-BUS | Momiyama Station・Shin-Kanuma Station・Kanuma Station | |
| Nikko Municipal Bus | Kami-Imaichi Station・Shimo-Imaichi Station・Imaichi Station・Shimotsuke-Ōsawa Station | |
| O-BUS | Oyama Station | |

=== Affiliated companies ===
==== Nasu Ropeway ====
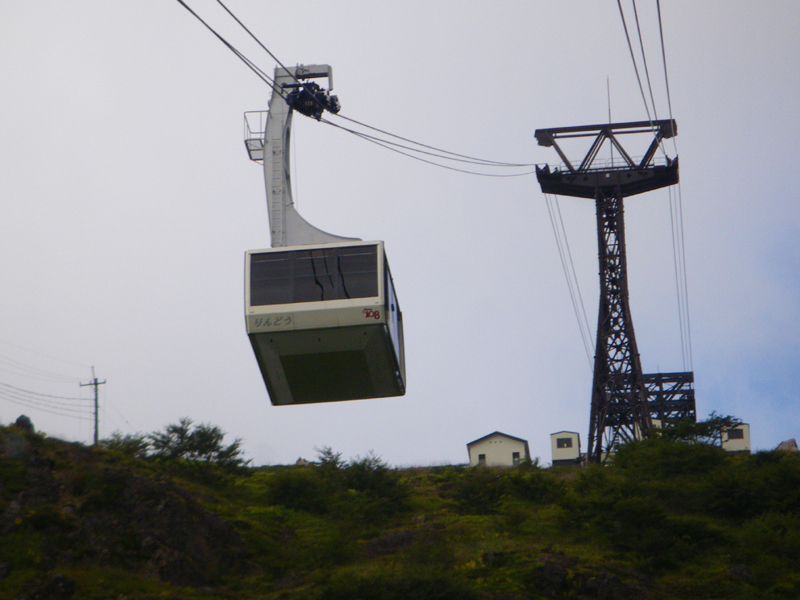
Vehicle of Nasu Ropeway "RINDO"

Kanto Transportation also operates a ropeway on Mount Nasu. The ropeway is 812 m long, has an elevation gain of 294 m, and takes 3 minutes and 40 seconds (one-way). It has a capacity of 111 people.

The ropeway has two stations: Sanroku Station (where passengers can transfer to buses for Nasu-Shiobara Station) and Sancho Station (on Mount Chausu).

==== Yashio Kankō Bus ====
Yashio Kankō Bus K.K.
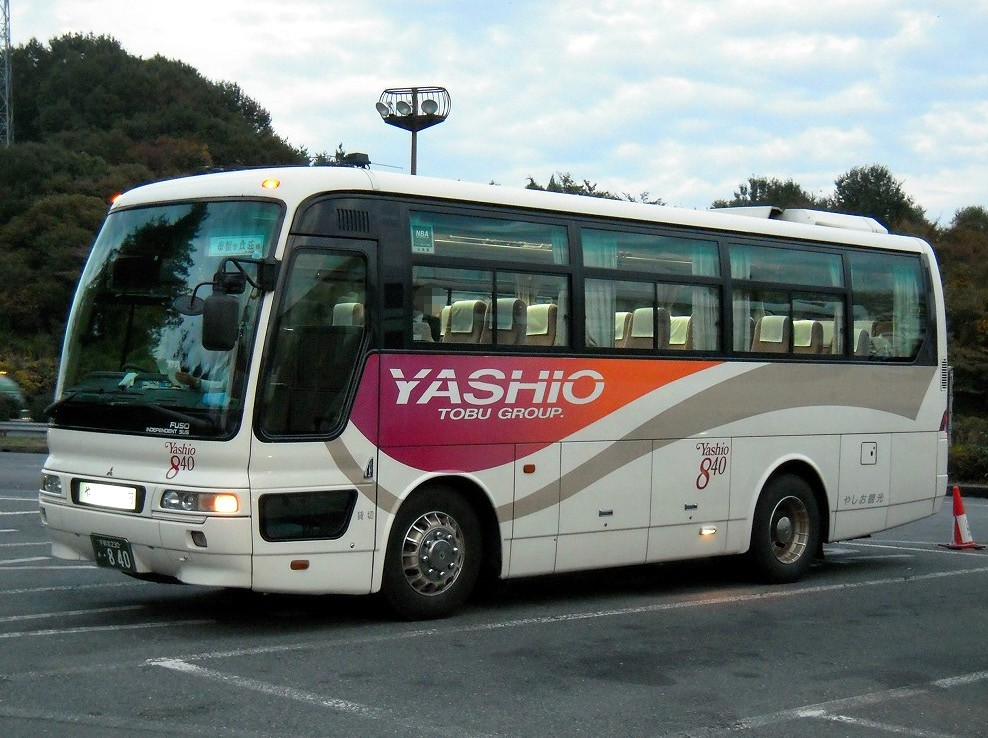
- Mitsubishi Fuso Aero Bus of Tobu Group Color
- Parent: Kanto Transportation
- Founded: June 1984
- Headquarters: 528-11 Sankumachi, Nasu-Shiobara, Tochigi, Japan (栃木県那須塩原市三区町528-11)
- Service area: Tochigi
- Service type: Bus
- Website: Yashio Kanko BUs (in Japanese)

Yashio Kankō Bus K.K. (やしお観光バス株式会社, Yashio Kankō Basu Kabushiki-gaisha) was established in June 1984 as part of Toya Kotsu, a subsidiary of Tobu Railway until 1 December 2016, when it was transferred to Michinori Holdings. In October 2018, Toya Kotsu was merged into Kanto Transportation.

===== Bus routes =====
| Name | Stops | Location | Note |
|---|---|---|---|
| Nasukarasuyama Municipal Bus (Bato-Karasuyama Line) | Karasuyama Station・Karasuyama High School・Owaku・Ogawa-Nakamachi・Nakagawa City Hall・Sanson Kaihatsu Center | Nasukarasuyama, Tochigi | operates with Nakagawa City |
| Nasushiobara Municipal Bus | Nasushiobara Station・Kuroiso Station・Nasu No-Shikei Geka Hospital | Nasushiobara, Tochigi | |
| Nakagawa Community Bus | Karasuyama Station・Karasuyama High School・Owaku・Ogawa-Nakamachi・Nakagawa City Hall・Sanson Kaihatsu Center | Nakagawa, Tochigi | |

=== Discontinued companies ===
==== Toya Kotsu ====
Toya Kotsu Co., Ltd.
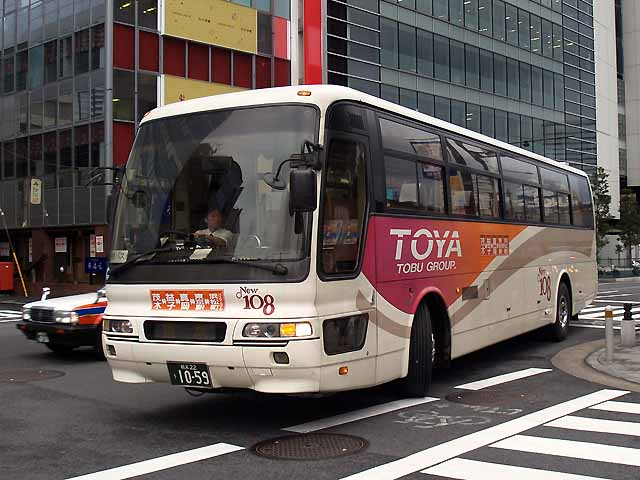
- Mitsubishi Fuso Aero Bus of Tobu Group Color
- Parent: Michinori Holdings
- Founded: 9 February 1916
- Headquarters: 19-8 Hirade Kogyo Danchi, Utsunomiya, Tochigi, Japan (栃木県宇都宮市平出工業団地19番地8)
- Service area: Tochigi
- Service type: Bus
- Chief executive: Motofumi Teduka (until 2018)
- Website: Toya Kotsu (in Japanese)

Toya Kotsu Co., Ltd. (東野交通株式会社, Tōya Kōtsū Kabushiki-gaisha) was a subsidiary of Tobu Railway until 2016, when it was transferred to Michinori Holdings. In 2018, it was merged into Kanto Transportation.

This bus company was established as Toya Railway in 1916. It began operating bus routes in 1928 and acquired other bus companies by 1934. The railway stations between Yutsuue Station and Nasu-Ogawa Station were discontinued in 1939. There was a planned extension from Nasu-Oagawa Station to Hitachi-Daigo Station. However, Toya Railway completely discontinued its railway line in 1968, and was renamed to Toya Kotsu in June 1969.

Toya Kotsu belonged to Tobu Railway from 1964 until 2016, at which time its shares were transferred to Michinori Holdings. In 2018, it was merged into Kanto Transportation. Nasu Ropeway and Yashio Kankō Bus were affiliated companies of Toya Kotsu until the merger in 2018.

== Northern Iwate Transportation ==
Northern Iwate Transportation Co., Ltd.
- Parent: Michinori Holdings
- Founded: 13 October 1943
- Headquarters: 1-17-18 Kuriyagawa, Morioka, Iwate (岩手県盛岡市厨川1-17-18)
- Service type: Bus
- Website: www.iwate-kenpokubus.co.jp

Northern Iwate Transportation Co., Ltd. (岩手県北自動車株式会社, Iwate Kenpoku Jidōsha Kabushiki-gaisha) is a bus company and wholly owned subsidiary of Michinori Holdings since 2010.

The company was established on 13 April 1943 as Iwate Kenpoku Motor, following the consolidation of bus companies in Iwate during World War II. It was renamed on 26 April 2009 as Northern Iwate Transportation. On 1 April 2010, it became an affiliated company of Michinori Holdings.

In 2016, Michinori Holdings began transferring Nambu Bus to this company. By 2017, the business of Nambu Bus was inherited by Northern Iwate Transportation.

The company headquarters are located at 1-17-18 Kuriyagawa, Morioka, Iwate.

This company is invested in the Iwate Galaxy Railway Line. The Iwate Galaxy Railway Company is based at Kuriyagawa Station.

=== Bus routes ===
==== Beam.1 ====
| Stops | Beam.1 | | Location | | Note |
| Stops | Yokohama ↓ Miyako | Yokohama ↑ Miyako | Location | | Note |
|---|---|---|---|---|---|
| Yokohama Station | 〇 | ● | | Kanagawa Prefecture | Track 17 |
| Shinagawa Station | ○ | ● | | Tokyo | |
| Morioka-minami | ● | ○ | | Iwate Prefecture | |
| Morioka Station | ● | ○ | | Iwate Prefecture | |
| Miyako Station | ● | ○ | Miyako | Iwate Prefecture | Track 6 |
| Yamada Branch | ● | ○ | | Iwate Prefecture | |
| Michi no Eki YAMADA | ● | ○ | | Iwate Prefecture | |

==== Urban ====
- Sendai Port・Sendai Station (Miyagi)・Morioka Station

==== Asunaro ====
| Stops | Asunaro | | Location | | Note |
| Stops | Morioka ↓ Aomori | Morioka ↑ Aomori | Location | | Note |
|---|---|---|---|---|---|
| Morioka Station | ○ | ● | | Iwate Prefecture | Track 23 |
| Hanawa | ◎／◆ | ◎／◇ | | Akita Prefecture | |
| Kosaka Highschool | ◎ | ◎ | | Akita Prefecture | |
| Ikarigaseki | ◎ | ◎ | Hirakawa | Aomori Prefecture | |
| Botandaira | ◎ | ◎ | | Aomori Prefecture | |
| Hagurodaira Namioka | ◎ | ◎ | Aomori | Aomori Prefecture | |
| Aomori-Ono | ● | ○ | Aomori | Aomori Prefecture | |
| Yanagimachi Dori | ● | ○ | Aomori | Aomori Prefecture | |
| Shinmachi 2 chome | ● | ○ | Aomori | Aomori Prefecture | |
| Aomori Station | ● | ○ | Aomori | Aomori Prefecture | Track 9 |
| Aomori Ferry Terminal | ● | ○ | Aomori | Aomori Prefecture | |

==== YODEL ====
| Stops | Yodel | | Location | Note |
| Stops | Morioka ↓ Hirosaki | Morioka ↑ Hirosaki | Location | Note |
|---|---|---|---|---|
| Morioka Station | ○ | ● | Iwate Prefecture | Track 23 |
| Tohoku-Owani | ● | ○ | Aomori Prefecture | |
| Hirosaki Station | ● | ○ | Aomori Prefecture | Track 1 |
| Hirosaki BT | ● | ○ | Aomori Prefecture | Track 2 |

==== Umineko ====
| Stops | Umineko | | Location | Note |
| Stops | Sendai ↓ Hachinohe | Sendai ↑ Hachinohe | Location | Note |
|---|---|---|---|---|
| Sendai Station | ○ | ● | Miyagi Prefecture | Track 74, 75 |
| Hachinohe Inter | ● | ○ | Aomori Prefecture | |
| Baba | ● | ○ | Aomori Prefecture | |
| Hachinohe Down Town BT | ● | ○ | Aomori Prefecture | |
| Hon-Hachinohe Station | ● | ○ | Aomori Prefecture | |
| Hachinohe LAPIA BT | ● | ○ | Aomori Prefecture | Track 4 |

==== Hachimori ====
- Morioka Bus Center・Morioka Station ⇔ Jōbōji, Iwate・Karumai, Iwate・Hachinohe Inter・Hon-Hachinohe Station・Hachinohe LAPIA BT・Hachinohe Ferry Terminal

==== Michinoku ====
| Stops | Odate | Morioka | Location | |
|---|---|---|---|---|
| Iwate Medical University | □ | ■ | Morioka, Iwate | Iwate Prefecture |
| Morinomichi minami | □ | ■ | Morioka, Iwate | Iwate Prefecture |
| Morioka Station | ○ | ● | Morioka, Iwate | Iwate Prefecture |
| Sakigata | ○ | ● | Morioka, Iwate | Iwate Prefecture |
| Morioka Inter | ｜ | ｜ | Morioka, Iwate | Iwate Prefecture |
| Ashiro Junction | ｜ | ｜ | Hachimantai, Iwate | Iwate Prefecture |
| Ashiro Interchange | ◎ | ◎ | Hachimantai, Iwate | Iwate Prefecture |
| Tayama Parking Area | ◎ | ◎ | Hachimantai, Iwate | Iwate Prefecture |
| Kaduno Hachimantai Interchange | ｜ | ｜ | Kazuno, Akita | Akita Prefecture |
| Kaduno Antora mae | ◎ | ◎ | Kazuno, Akita | Akita Prefecture |
| Kazuno-Hanawa Station | ◎ | ◎ | Kazuno, Akita | Akita Prefecture |
| Kemanai | ◎ | ◎ | Kazuno, Akita | Akita Prefecture |
| Otaki Onsen | ● | ○ | Odate, Akita | Akita Prefecture |
| Hinaicho iriguchi | ● | ○ | Odate, Akita | Akita Prefecture |
| Odate | ● | ○ | Odate, Akita | Akita Prefecture |
| Itoku Odate Shopping Mall | ● | – | Odate, Akita | Akita Prefecture |
| Shuhoku Bus Headquarters | ｜ | ○ | Odate, Akita | Akita Prefecture |
| Odate Station | ● | ○ | Odate, Akita | Akita Prefecture |
| Itoku Odate Shopping Mall | – | ○ | Odate, Akita | Akita Prefecture |

Michinori Express (MEX)
| Name | Stops | Note |
|---|---|---|
| MEX Aomori Line | Aomori Ferry Terminal・Aomori Station・Hirosaki Station・Saitama-Shintoshin Station・Shinjuku Highway Bus Terminal・Tokyo Disney Sea | |
| MEX Hachinohe Line | Hachiohe LAPIA BT・Hon-Hachinohe Station・Morioka Station・Yahaba Station・Shinjuku Highway Bus Terminal・Kawasaki Station | |
| MEX Misawa Line | Misawa Station・Hachiohe LAPIA BT・Hachinohe Station・Morioka Station・Shinjuku Highway Bus Terminal・Tokyo Disney Sea | |

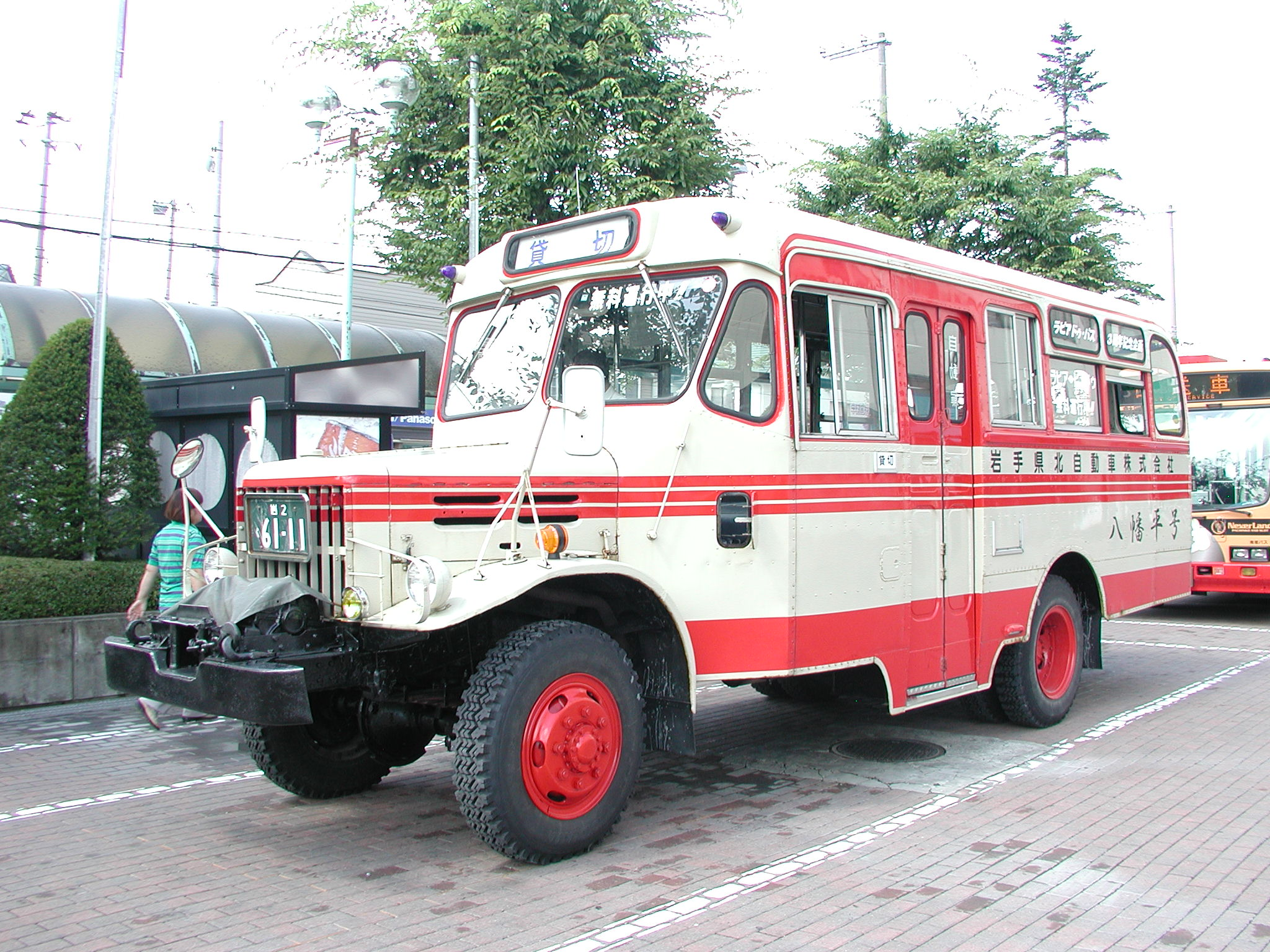
Isuzu TX produced in 1968

=== Nambu Bus ===
Nanbu Bus Co., Ltd.
- Founded: 21 February 1926
- Headquarters: 6-79 Korekawa-Futatsuya, Hachinohe, Aomori, Japan (青森県八戸市是川二ツ屋6-79)
- Service area: Aomori
- Service type: Bus
- Website: Nanbu Bus (in Japanese)

This bus company was merged into Northern Iwate Transportation on 1 March 2017, and the company was discontinued in 2018, but route buses which run around the southern Aomori and are operated by Iwate Kenpoku Bus Nanbu Branch are called Nanbu Bus as a nickname.

The company was establishment as Gonohe Electric Railway on 21 February 1926. It opened rail lines between Shirinai Station and Kami-Shichizaki Station (23 August 1929), between Kami-Shichizaki and Shitogishi (10 October 1929), and between Shitogishi and Gonohe Station (1 April 1930). On 28 October 1931, the company began offering bus services as well. The company was renamed "Gonohe Railway" 1936 and subsequently Nambu Railway in 1945.

Operation of the railway line was suspended following the 1968 Tokachi earthquake, and in April 1969, the company discontinued its railway business. On 30 May 1970, it was renamed to Nambu Bus.

== Ibaraki Kotsu ==
Ibaraki Kotsu Co., Ltd.

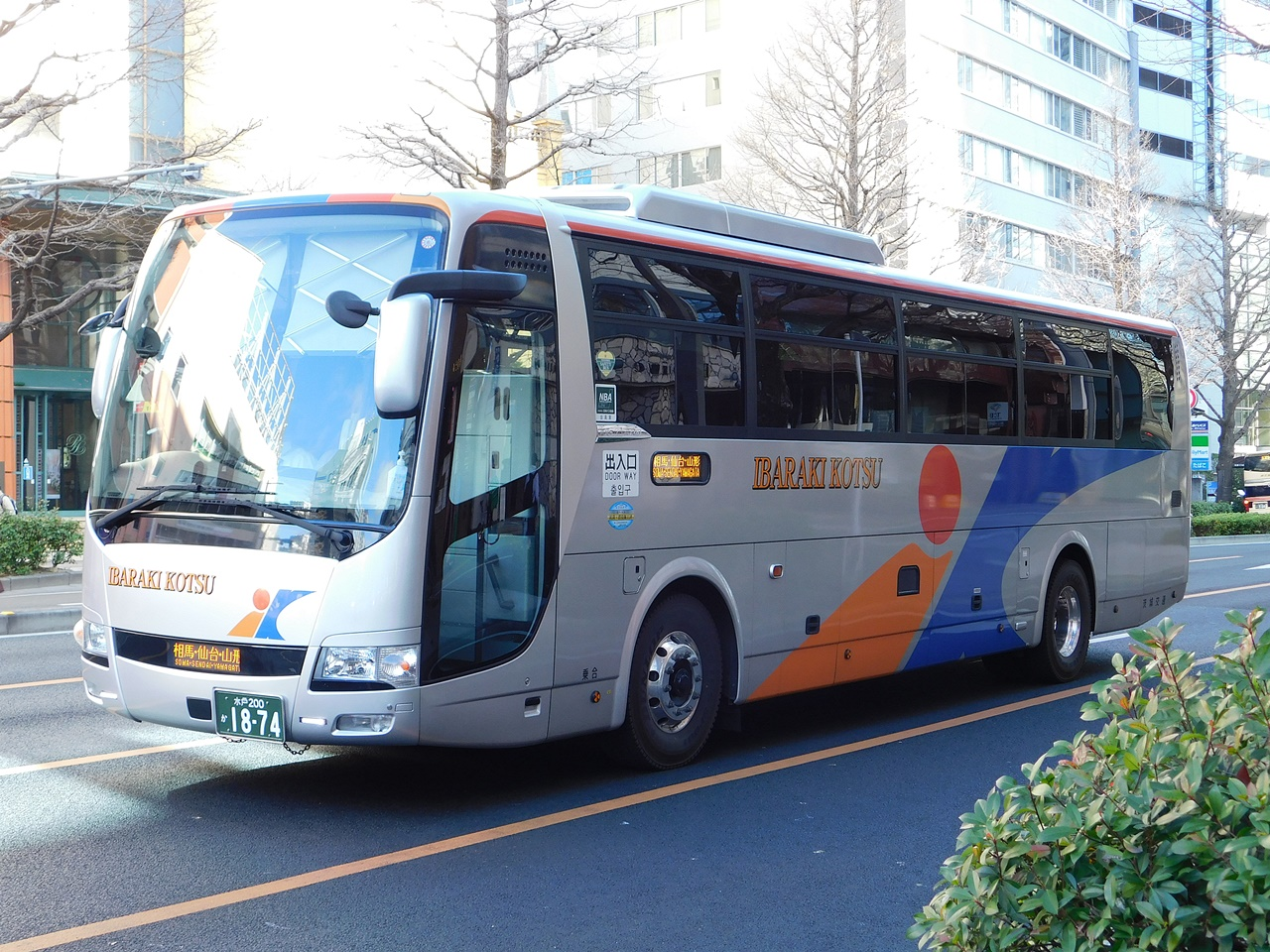
- Parent: Michinori Holdings
- Founded: 27 March 2009
- Headquarters: 3-5-36 Hakamaduka, Mito, Ibaraki, Japan (茨城県水戸市袴塚三丁目5番36号)
- Service area: Ibaraki
- Service type: Bus
- Chief executive: 任田 正史
- Website: Ibaraki Kotsu (in Japanese)

Ibaraki Kotsu Co., Ltd. (茨城交通株式会社, Ibaraki Kōtsū Kabushiki-gaisha) is a bus company that operates many bus routes in Ibaraki. It is a wholly owned subsidiary of Michinori Holdings. Affiliated companies include the Hitachinaka Seaside Railway and Kanto Railway.

The service area is based at Mito Station and covers northern and central Ibaraki Prefecture and southern Tochigi Prefecture.

=== Outline ===
Ibaraki Kotsu was established on 1 August 1944 due to integration during World War II. It was formed as the merger of three railway companies: Suihin Densha (established 1921; discontinued 1966), Ibaraki Railway (established 1923; discontinued 1971), and Minato Railway (established 1907). Following the merger, Ibaraki Kotsu controlled three lines: the Suihin Line, the Ibaraki Line, and the Minato Line. In 2008, the Ibaraki Kotsu Minato Line was transferred to Hitachinaka Seaside Railway.

In October 1992, Ibako Kenhoku Bus was established, but later merged into Ibaraki Kotsu in February 2010. On 1 June 2010, Ibaraki Auto was also merged into Ibaraki Kotsu.

Hitachi Dentetsu Kotsu Service was merged into this company on 1 May 2019, and the Hitachi Dentetsu Taxi was renamed to Dentetsu Taxi.

Nanohana Kotsu, a tourist bus company, became an affiliated company of Ibaraki Kotsu.

=== Requested Civil Rehabilitation ===
By the late 2000s, Ibaraki Kotsu had too debt, so the company applied under the Civil Rehabilitation Act. On 19 November 2008, it was determined that the company would be reconstructed. On 27 March 2009, Industrial Growth Platform began supporting the company, and established IBAKO Co., Ltd. which inherited the assets of Ibaraki Kotsu.

=== Hitachi Dentetsu Kotsu ===
Hitachi Dentetsu Kotsu Service Co.
- Parent: Michinori Holdings
- Service area: Ibaraki
- Service type: Bus
- Website: Hitachi Dentetsu Kotsu(in Japanese)

Hitachi Dentetsu Kotsu Service Co., Ltd. (日立電鉄交通サービス株式会社, Hitachi Dentetsu Kōtsū Sābisu Kabushiki-gaisha) was a bus company that operated many bus routes in Ibaraki. In 2019, this company was discontinued and merged into Ibaraki Kotsu. Until 1 April 2005, this company had operated the Hitachi Electric Railway Line.

== Higashinihon Kotsu ==
Higashinihon Kotsu Co., Ltd
- Parent: Michinori Holdings
- Founded: 16 January 1979
- Headquarters: 17-2 Yamagishi-Ohira, Morioka, Iwate, Japan (岩手県盛岡市山岸大平17-2)
- Service area: Iwate
- Service type: Bus
- Chief executive: Jun Matsumoto
- Website: Higashinihon Kotsu (in Japanese)

Higashinihon Kotsu Co, Ltd. (東日本交通株式会社, Higashinihon Kōtsū Kabushiki-gaisha) is a bus company that operates bus routes in Iwate. It is a wholly owned subsidiary of Michinori Holdings.

=== Outline ===
The firm was established as Chuo Kanko in 1974. The registered persisting company was established on 16 January 1979 as Chuo Kanko LLC. On 24 April 2018, a manager requested acquisition from Michinori Holdings because of old age.

=== Bus routes ===
Higashinihon Kotsu – Bus Routes
| Name | Stops | Note |
|---|---|---|
| Iwaizumi – Moichi Line | Miyako Hospital・Miyako Station・Sentoku Station・Moichi Station・Kariya Station・Nakasato・Wainai Station・Utsuno・Fushiya・Asanai・Nishoishi・Iwaizumi bashi・Iwaizumi Hospital | Bustitution of the Iwaizumi Line, since 1 April 2014 |
| Yamabushi Line | Hottoyuda Station・Yumoto Onsen・Kaizawa・Morioka Station・Morioka Bus Center | |
| Hanamaki Airport Shuttle Bus | Kitakami Station・Hanamaki Airport | |

== Parent company ==
Industrial Growth Platform, Inc.
- Native name: 株式会社経営共創基盤
- Romanized name: Kabushiki gaisha Keiei-Kyoso Kiban
- Founded: April 3, 2007; 19 years ago (incorporation)
- Headquarters: 1-9-2 Marunouchi, Chiyoda-ku, Tokyo (東京都千代田区丸の内1-9-2 グラントウキョウサウスタワー17階), Japan
- Key people: Kazuhiko Toiyama (CEO)
- Owner: N.E.CHEMCAT, KDDI, Sumitomo Corporation, Toho Bank, Nomura Holdings, Recruit Holdings, Resona Holdings, Bank of Yokohama, Sumitomo Mitsui Banking Corporation, Fuji Soft
- Subsidiaries: Michinori Holdings; Nanki-Shirahama Airport
- Website: www.igpi.co.jp

Industrial Growth Platform, Inc. (株式会社経営共創基盤, Kabushiki-gaisha Keiei-Kyoso Kiban) is a holding company located in Chiyoda, Tokyo. Its main operation is that it manages and has shares of Michinori Holdings, Inc (株式会社みちのりホールディングス, Kabushiki-gaisha Michinori Hōrudingusu), which is a wholly owned subsidiary providing services such as railway lines and bus routes in Japan. Nanki-Shirahama Airport is also managed by Nanki-Shirahama Airport, Inc., a subsidiary of Industrial Growth Platform.

The company servants are transferred from Industrial Revitalization Corporation of Japan. Its main business was management reconstruction for companies that had too many liabilities to continue operating, but that still had business resources.

== See also ==
- Tōbu Bus Nikko
- Asahi Motor Corporation
- Keihin Kyuko Electric Railway
- Seibu Railway
- Tokyu Corporation
- Kokusai Kogyo
  - Kokusai Tohoku
- Ryobi Holdings
