= Oshikado Station =

Railway station in Japan

Coordinates: 39.7241°N 141.6933°E

Oshikado Station 押角駅
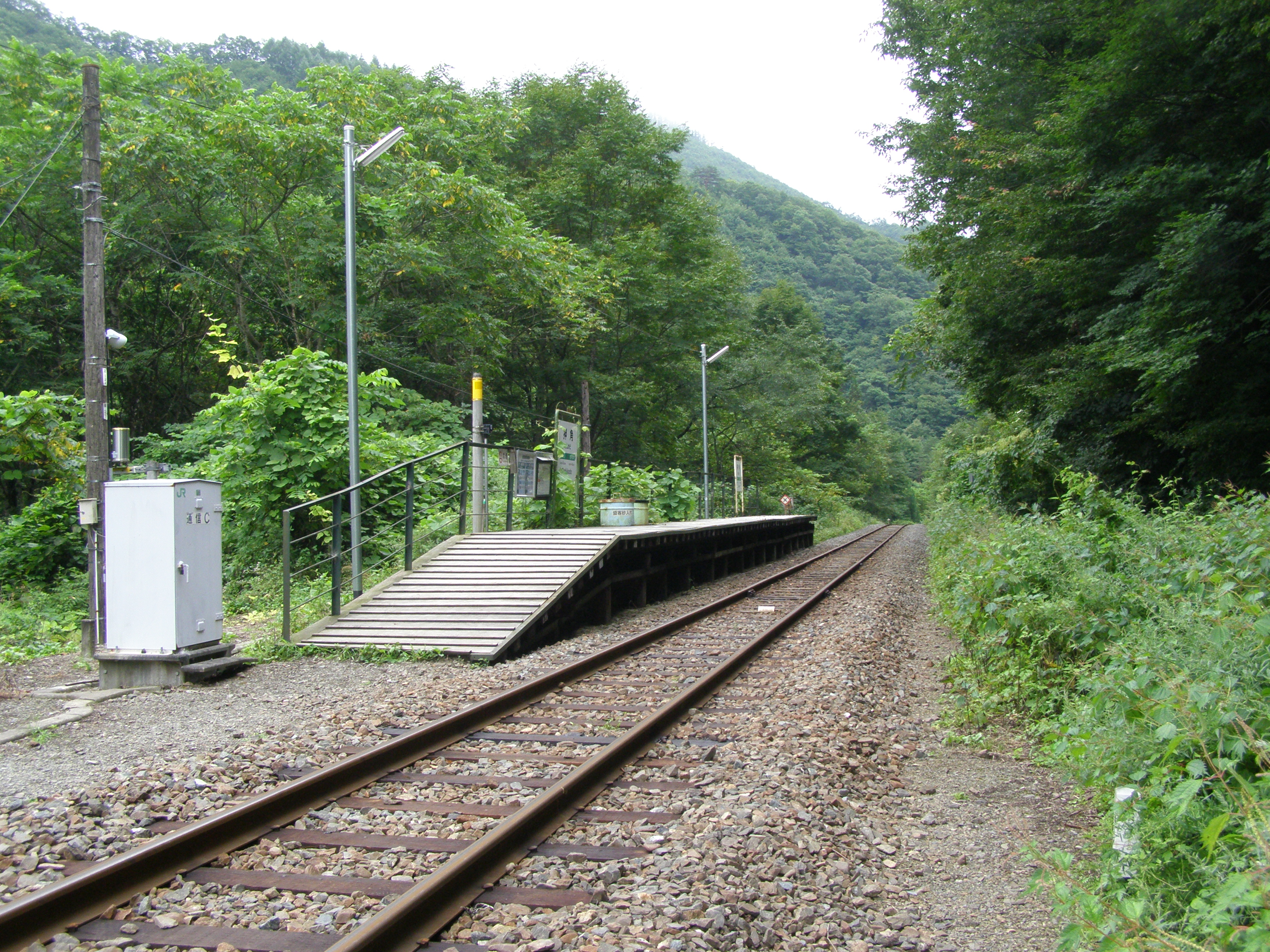
- Oshikado Station, August 2007

General information
- Location: Wainai dai-ichi jiwari 10, Miyako, Iwate （岩手県宮古市和井内第1地割10） Japan
- Operator: JR East
- Line: Iwaizumi Line

History
- Opened: 1944
- Closed: 2014

Former services
Preceding station	JR East	Following station
Iwate-Ōkawa towards Iwaizumi	Iwaizumi Line	Iwate-Wainai towards Moichi
Location

Oshikado Station (押角駅, Oshikado-eki) was a railway station on the Iwaizumi Line in Miyako, Japan, operated by East Japan Railway Company (JR East).

== Lines ==
Oshikado Station was a station on the Iwaizumi Line, and was located 15.8 rail kilometers from the opposing terminus of the line at Moichi Station.

== Station layout ==
Oshikado Station had a single side platform serving traffic in both directions. The station was unattended.

== History ==
Oshikado Station opened on 20 July 1944. The station was absorbed into the JR East network upon the privatization of the Japanese National Railways (JNR) on 1 April 1987. The operation of the Iwaizumi Line was suspended in July 2010 and the line was officially closed on 1 April 2014.

== Surrounding area ==
The station is located in an isolated rural area surrounded by mountains and forests. There are no stores or houses in the vicinity.
