= Iwate-Ōkawa Station =

Railway station in Japan

Coordinates: 39.8002°N 141.6721°E

Iwate-Ōkawa Station 岩手大川駅
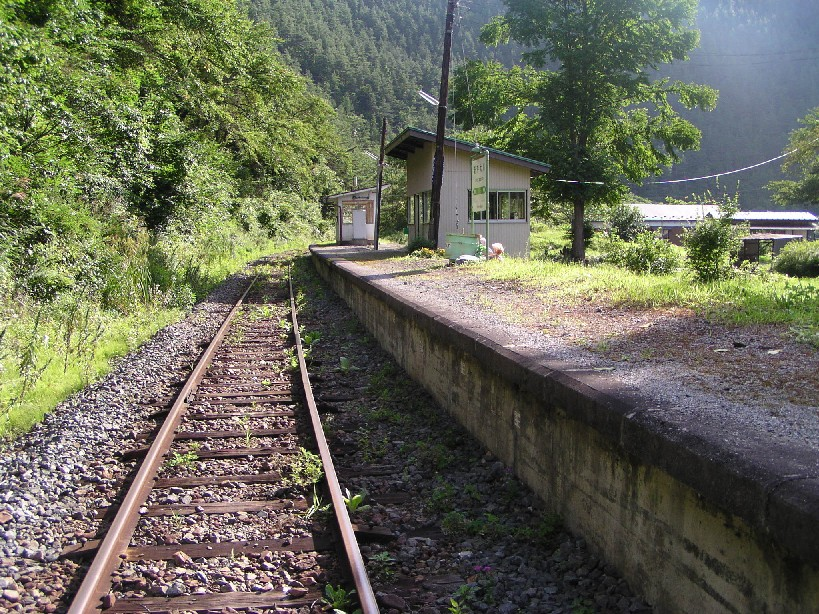
- Iwate-Ōkawa Station, August 2008

General information
- Location: Ōkawa Mai-no-ko 64, Iwaizumi, Iwate （岩手県下閉伊郡岩泉町大川字舞の子64） Japan
- Operator: JR East
- Line: Iwaizumi Line

History
- Opened: 1954
- Closed: 2014

Former services
Preceding station	JR East	Following station
Asanai towards Iwaizumi	Iwaizumi Line	Oshikado towards Moichi
Location

Iwate-Ōkawa Station (岩手大川駅, Iwate-Ōkawa-eki) was a railway station on the Iwaizumi Line in Iwaizumi, Iwate, Japan, operated by East Japan Railway Company (JR East).

== Lines ==
Iwate-Ōkawa Station was a station on the Iwaizumi Line, and was located 25.8 rail kilometers from the opposing terminus of the line at Moichi Station.

== Station layout ==
Iwate-Ōkawa Station had a single side platform serving traffic in both directions. The station was unattended.

== History ==
Iwate-Ōkawa Station opened on 16 May 1957. The station was absorbed into the JR East network upon the privatization of the Japanese National Railways (JNR) on 1 April 1987. The operation of the Iwaizumi Line was suspended from July 2010 and the line was officially closed on 1 April 2014.

== Surrounding area ==
- Iwate-Ōkawa Post Office
- Japan National Route 340
