= Asanai Station =

Railway station in Japan

Coordinates: 39.8196°N 141.7269°E

Asanai Station 浅内駅
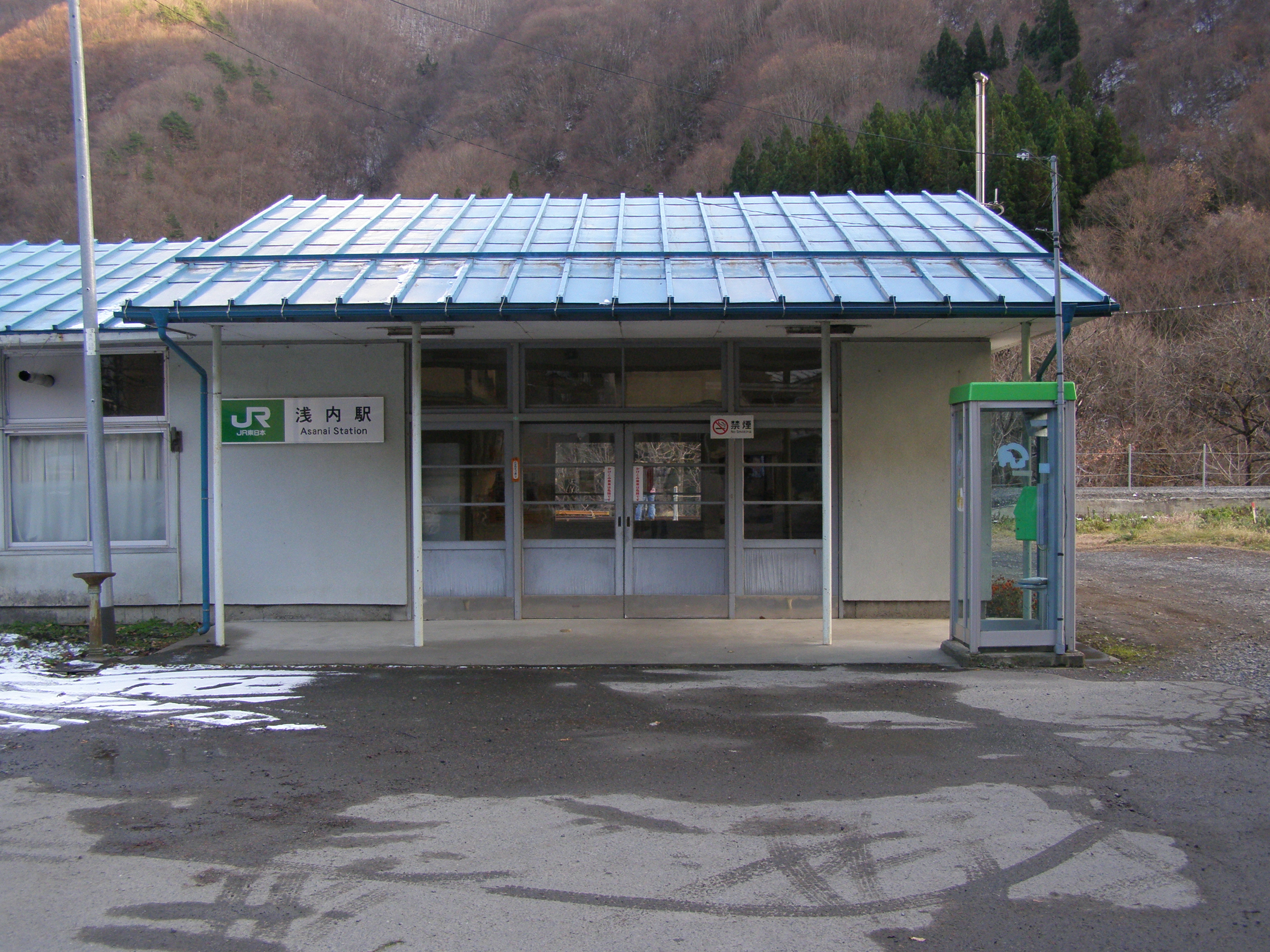
- Asanai Station, January 2008

General information
- Location: Asanai Komori 69, Iwaizumi, Iwate （岩手県下閉伊郡岩泉町浅内字小森69） Japan
- Operator: JR East
- Line: Iwaizumi Line

History
- Opened: 1957
- Closed: 2014

Former services
Preceding station	JR East	Following station
Nishōishi towards Iwaizumi	Iwaizumi Line	Iwate-Ōkawa towards Moichi
Location

Asanai Station (浅内駅, Asanai-eki) was a railway station on the Iwaizumi Line in Iwaizumi, Iwate, Japan, operated by East Japan Railway Company (JR East).

== Lines ==
Asanai Station was a station on the Iwaizumi Line, and was located 31.0 rail kilometers from the opposing terminus of the line at Moichi Station.

== Station layout ==
Asanai Station had a single side platform serving traffic in both directions. The station was unattended.

== History ==
Asanai Station opened on 15 May 1957, as the initial terminal station for the Iwaizumi Line. The line was extended to Iwaizumi Station on 6 February 1972. The station was absorbed into the JR East network upon the privatization of the Japanese National Railways (JNR) on 1 April 1987. The operation of the Iwaizumi Line was suspended from July 2010 and the line was officially closed on 1 April 2014.

== Surrounding area ==
- Asanai Power Station
- Japan National Route 340
- Japan National Route 455
