= Nakasato Station =

Nakasato Station is the name of several train stations in Japan:

- Nakasato Station (Iwate) (中里駅)
- Nakasato Station (Nagano) (中佐都駅)
