= Iwate-Wainai Station =

Former railway station in Miyako, Japan

Coordinates: 39.6800°N 141.7155°E

Iwate-Wainai Station 岩手和井内駅
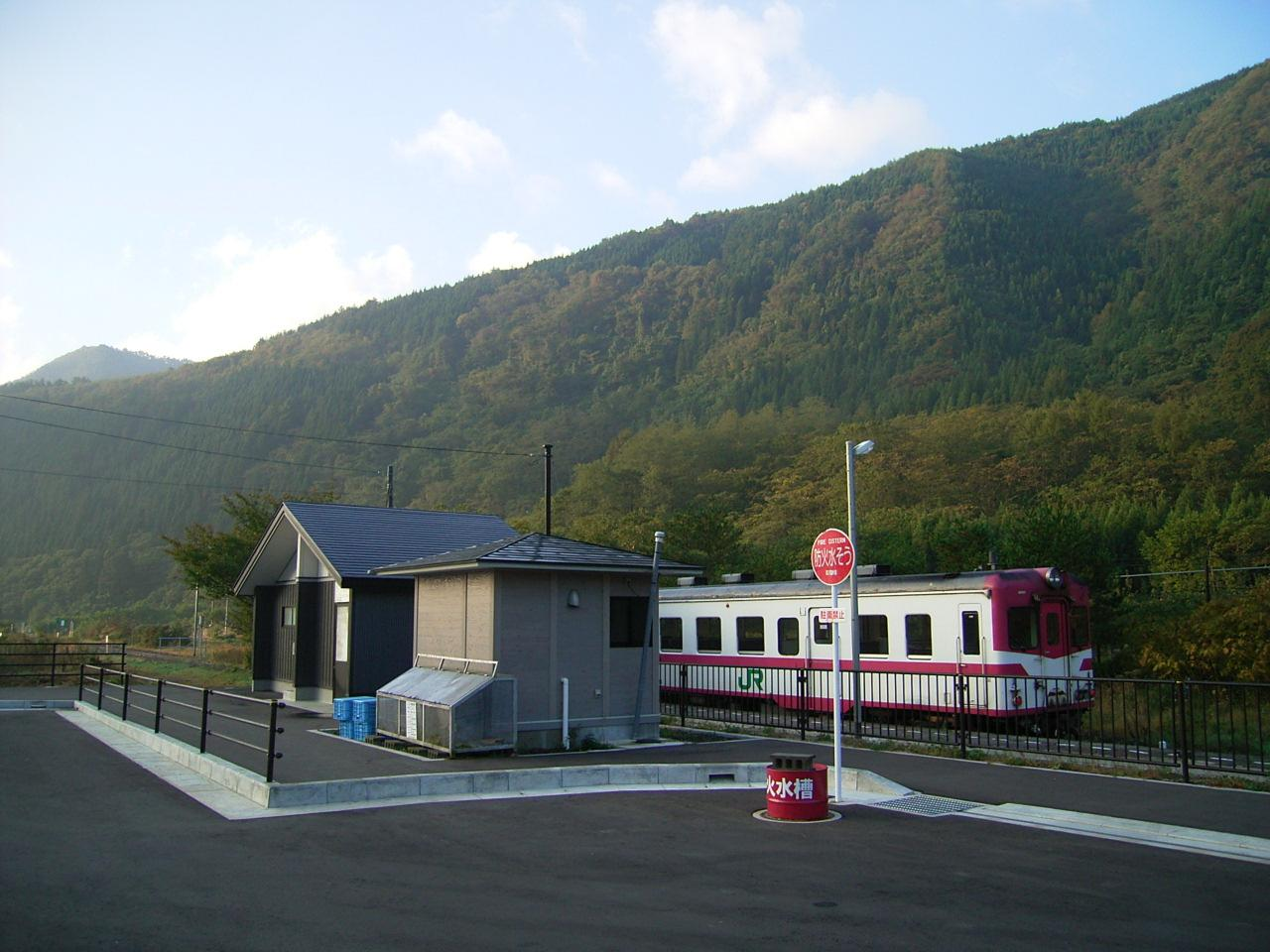
- Iwate-Wainai Station, October 2006

General information
- Location: Wainai dai-21 jiwari 11, Miyako, Iwate （岩手県宮古市和井内第21地割11） Japan
- Operator: JR East
- Line: Iwaizumi Line

History
- Opened: 1942
- Closed: 2014

Former services
Preceding station	JR East	Following station
Oshikado towards Iwaizumi	Iwaizumi Line	Nakasato towards Moichi
Location

Iwate-Wainai Station (岩手和井内駅, Iwate-Wainai-eki) was a railway station on the Iwaizumi Line in Miyako, Japan, operated by East Japan Railway Company (JR East).

== Lines ==
Iwate-Wainai Station was a station on the Iwaizumi Line, and was located 10.0 rail kilometers from the opposing terminus of the line at Moichi Station.

== Station layout ==
Iwate-Wainai Station had a single side platform serving traffic in both directions. The original station building was demolished in December 2004 and replaced by a simple waiting room. The station was unattended.

== History ==
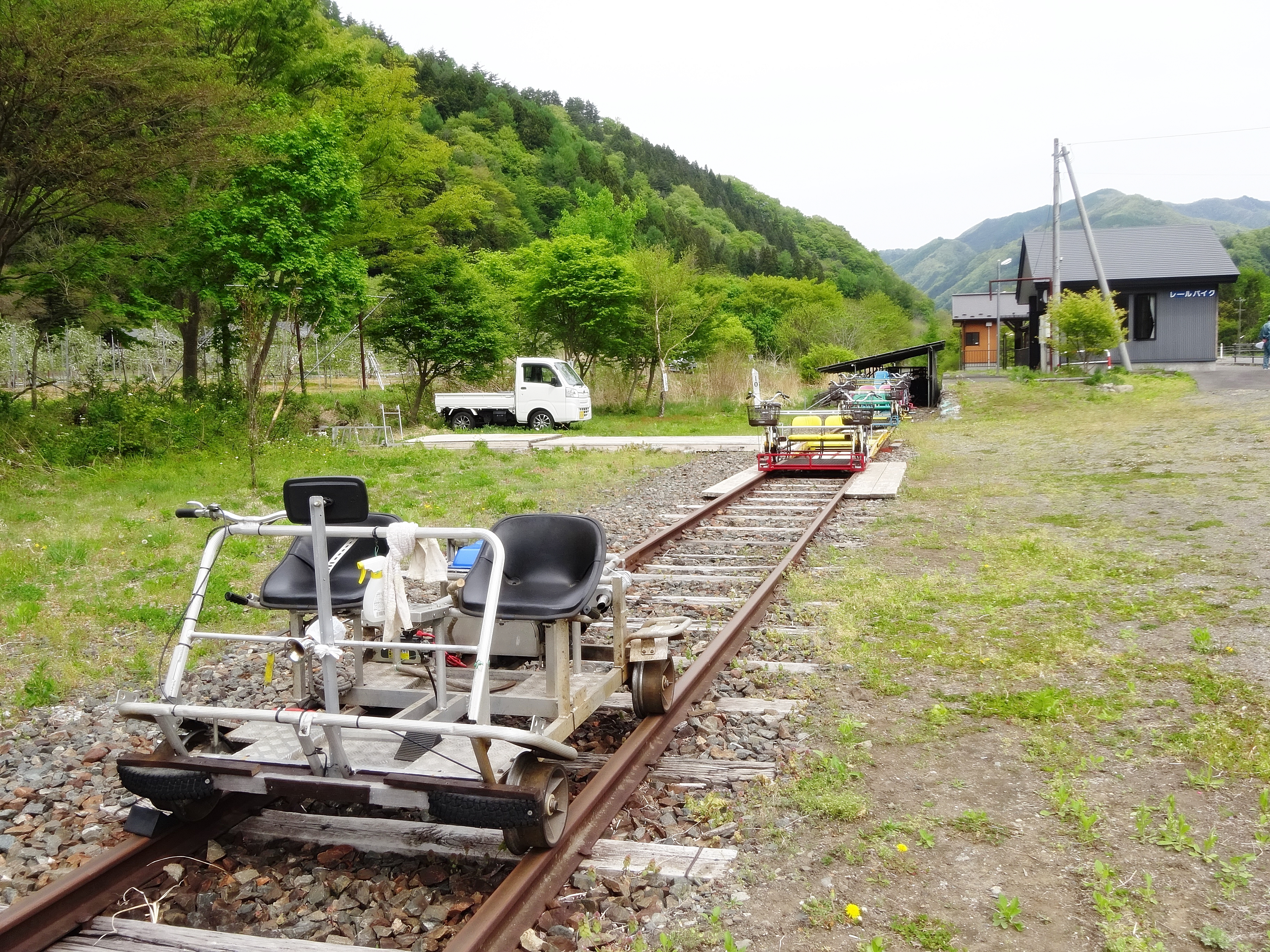
Wainai draisines in April 2023

Iwate-Wainai Station opened on 25 June 1942. The station was absorbed into the JR East network upon the privatization of the Japanese National Railways (JNR) on 1 April 1987. The operation of the Iwaizumi Line was suspended from July 2010 and the line was officially closed on 1 April 2014.

Documented in 2023, some track at the station is used for human-powered draisines.

== Surrounding area ==
- Wainai Post Office
- Japan National Route 340
