= Nishōishi Station =

Former railway station in Japan

Coordinates: 39.8365°N 141.7455°E

Nishōishi Station 二升石駅
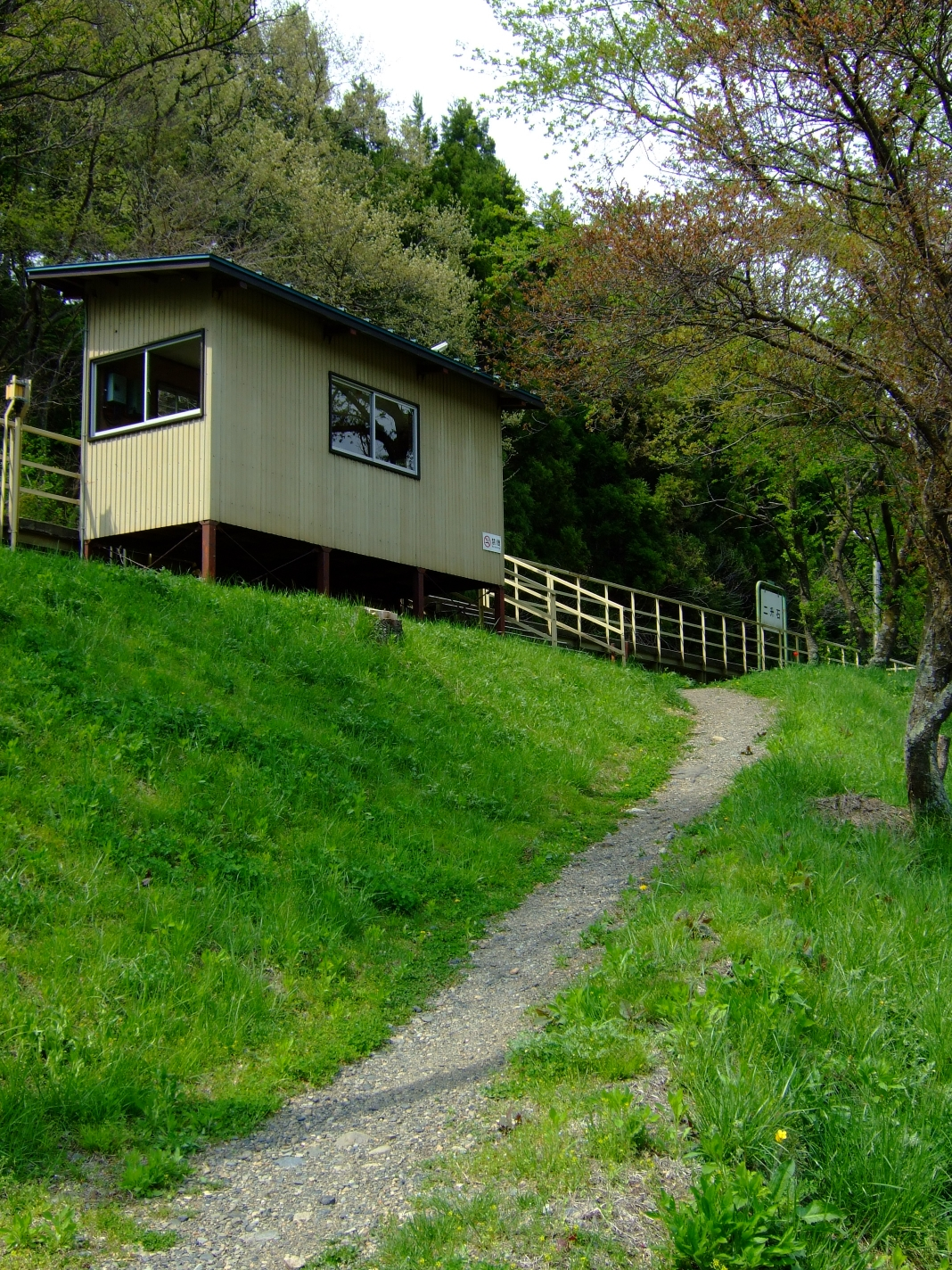
- Nishōishi Station, May 2009

General information
- Location: Nishōishi dai-40 jiwari 42, Iwaizumi, Iwate （岩手県下閉伊郡岩泉町二升石字下和見11地） Japan
- Operator: JR East
- Line: Iwaizumi Line

History
- Opened: 1972
- Closed: 2014

Former services
| Preceding station | JR East | Following station |
|---|---|---|
| Iwaizumi Terminus | Iwaizumi Line | Asanai towards Moichi |
Location

Nishōishi Station (二升石駅, Nishōishi-eki) was a railway station on the Iwaizumi Line in Iwaizumi, Iwate, Japan, operated by East Japan Railway Company (JR East).

== Lines ==
Nishōishi Station was a station on the Iwaizumi Line, and was located 33.8 rail kilometers from the opposing terminus of the line at Moichi Station.

== Station layout ==
Nishōishi Station had a single side platform serving traffic in both directions. The station was unattended.

== History ==
Nishōishi Station opened on 6 February 1972. The station was absorbed into the JR East network upon the privatization of the Japanese National Railways (JNR) on 1 April 1987. The operation of the Iwaizumi Line was suspended from July 2010 and the line was officially closed on 1 April 2014.

== Surrounding area ==
- Iwaizumi Nishōishi Elementary School
