= Iwaizumi Line =

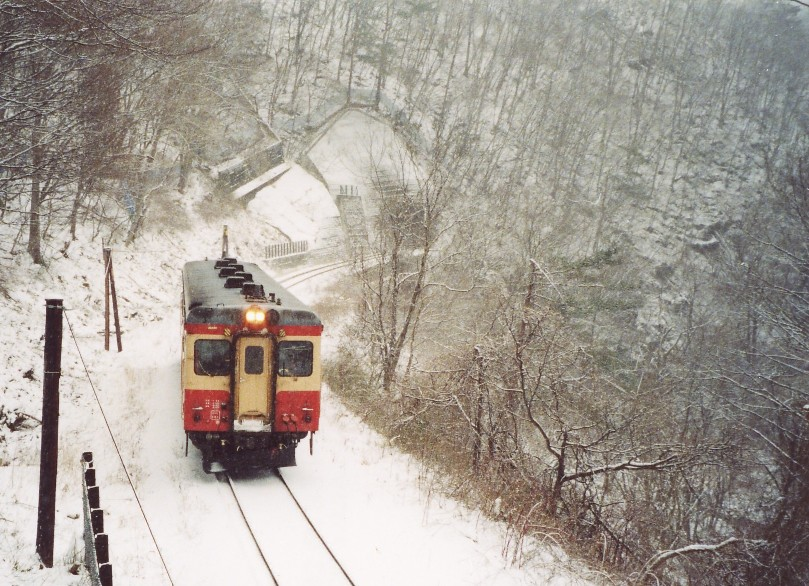
- A diesel train on the Iwaizumi Line, March 2007

Overview
- Native name: 岩泉線
- Status: Closed
- Owner: JR East
- Locale: Iwate Prefecture
- Termini: Moichi; Iwaizumi
- Stations: 9

Service
- Type: Heavy rail
- Operator(s): JR East
- Rolling stock: KiHa 110 series DMU

History
- Opened: 1972 (whole line completed)
- Closed: 31 July 2010 (officially closed 1 April 2014)

Technical
- Line length: 38.4 km (23.9 mi)
- Number of tracks: Entire line single tracked
- Character: Rural
- Track gauge: 1,067 mm (3 ft 6 in)
- Electrification: None
- Operating speed: 85 km/h (53 mph)

The Iwaizumi Line (岩泉線, Iwaizumi-sen) was a railway line in Japan, operated by the East Japan Railway Company (JR East) between Moichi Station in Miyako, Iwate and Iwaizumi Station in Iwaizumi, Iwate.

Operations on the line were suspended on July 31, 2010 when a train derailed due to a landslide between Oshikado and Iwate-Ōkawa Station. Bus services have since substituted for trains, and the line was formally closed on 1 April 2014.

== History ==
The line was first planned under the Railway Construction Act in 1922. While this line was not expected to be built as soon as it was planned, the construction to build the line to Asanai Station began during World War II to transport fire clay. The first section to Iwate-Wainai opened on June 25, 1942, as Omoto Line. The line was extended to Oshikado on July 20, 1944, although this extension at the time only served freight services. The construction continued after the World War, and the line was finally extended on November 25, 1947, to Utsuno station, located at the exit of the Oshikado Tunnel. Passenger services beyond Iwate-Wainai also commenced with the opening of this extension. After a short pause, the construction was resumed in 1952. The line was extended to Asanai on May 16, 1957, and Utsuno Station was closed on the same date. While the initially planned section from 1922 was completed by this extension, the town of Iwaizumi was not satisfied with it and began a large-scale movement to extend the line into the town's center. As a result, the extension to Iwaizumi-Omoto Station was surveyed in 1961. The Japan Railway Construction Public Corporation began extending the line to Iwaizumi Station in January 1968, which was completed on February 6, 1972. The line was also renamed to Iwaizumi Line at the same time. While the number of passengers increased upon extension to Iwaizumi, it began to steadily decline from 1975.

=== Listing as a specified local line ===
The line was listed as one of the specified local lines, a movement to decommission deficit lines with little passengers in 1982 as they met the criteria for inclusion. Freight services were terminated on November 15 of that year. Following this event, the Iwate Prefecture, the municipality of Iwazumi and Niisato conducted an experiment to see if JNR bus works as a replacement for the line. The test run on December 24, 1982, found that the Japan National Route 340 was not wide enough to allow buses to pass each other. Due to this result, the local municipalities argued that bus lines cannot operate to replace the line, although JNR argued that the National Route 340 still works fine enough as an alternative. In August 1985, the closure of the line was indefinitely postponed, along with Meishō Line which also suffered from the same issue.

However, ridership on the line continued to fall with just 20,000 people living nearby the line in 1995. Only 186 people used the line on average every day during this period, which was "not the number of users you'd see from a railway line". JR Bus Tōhoku and Iwate Kotsu operated bus lines to Morioka and Miyako, and only a small area near Iwate-Ōkawa Station had benefited from Iwazumi Line. In 1995, the Morioka branch of the East Japan Railway Company proposed a workshop to reconsider the future of the line to passing municipalities. While JR East did not directly tell them that they are proposing the line to be closed, passing municipalities took the proposal as a notice of closure, and a possible threat to the future operation of the Yamada Line.

=== Closure ===
Operations on the line were suspended on July 31, 2010, when a train derailed due to a landslide, which occurred between Oshikado Station and Iwate-Ōkawa Station. Trains were substituted by bus services. After investigating the accident and the condition of the line, JR East announced on March 30, 2012, that it was giving up on the idea of restoring the line. The company claimed that the cost expected to secure the safety of the line would be about 1.3 billion yen and that it could not afford to spend such an amount considering its very small public demand. According to the company, annual revenue of the line was 8.4 million yen in 2009, with the average daily passenger count being 49, while the cost to operate the line was 2.65 billion yen, resulting in an annual operating loss of 2.57 billion yen. Local governments, including Iwate Prefecture, raised objection to the decision. In November 2013, JR East announced that agreement had been reached with local governments to formally close the line, which occurred on 1 April 2014.

Since 1 April 2014, Higashinihon Kotsu has operated the Iwaizumi-Moichi Line which is a bustitution.

== Services ==
The line had five return trips with a mixed train for its first years. One return trip was suspended in January 1945, and another in March 1947, although the number of trips were restored to five in 1952. Diesel multiple units were introduced to the line from February 1961 to February 1963, reducing the total trip time from an hour and a half to around 50 minutes. The number of freight services were revised to have two return trips. From 1992 to the line's last years of operation, only three return trips and a service terminating at Iwate-Wainai serviced the line.

== List of stations ==
| Station | Japanese | Distance (km) | Transfers | Location | |
|---|---|---|---|---|---|
| Moichi | 茂市 | 0.0 | ■ Yamada Line | Miyako | Iwate |
| Iwate-Kariya | 岩手刈屋 | 4.3 | | Miyako | Iwate |
| Nakasato | 中里 | 7.2 | | Miyako | Iwate |
| Iwate-Wainai | 岩手和井内 | 10.0 | | Miyako | Iwate |
| Oshikado | 押角 | 15.8 | | Miyako | Iwate |
| Iwate-Ōkawa | 岩手大川 | 25.8 | | Iwaizumi | Iwate |
| Asanai | 浅内 | 31.0 | | Iwaizumi | Iwate |
| Nishōishi | 二升石 | 33.8 | | Iwaizumi | Iwate |
| Iwaizumi | 岩泉 | 38.4 | | Iwaizumi | Iwate |
