= Haratai Station =

Railway station in Miyako, Iwate Prefecture, Japan

Haratai Station 腹帯駅
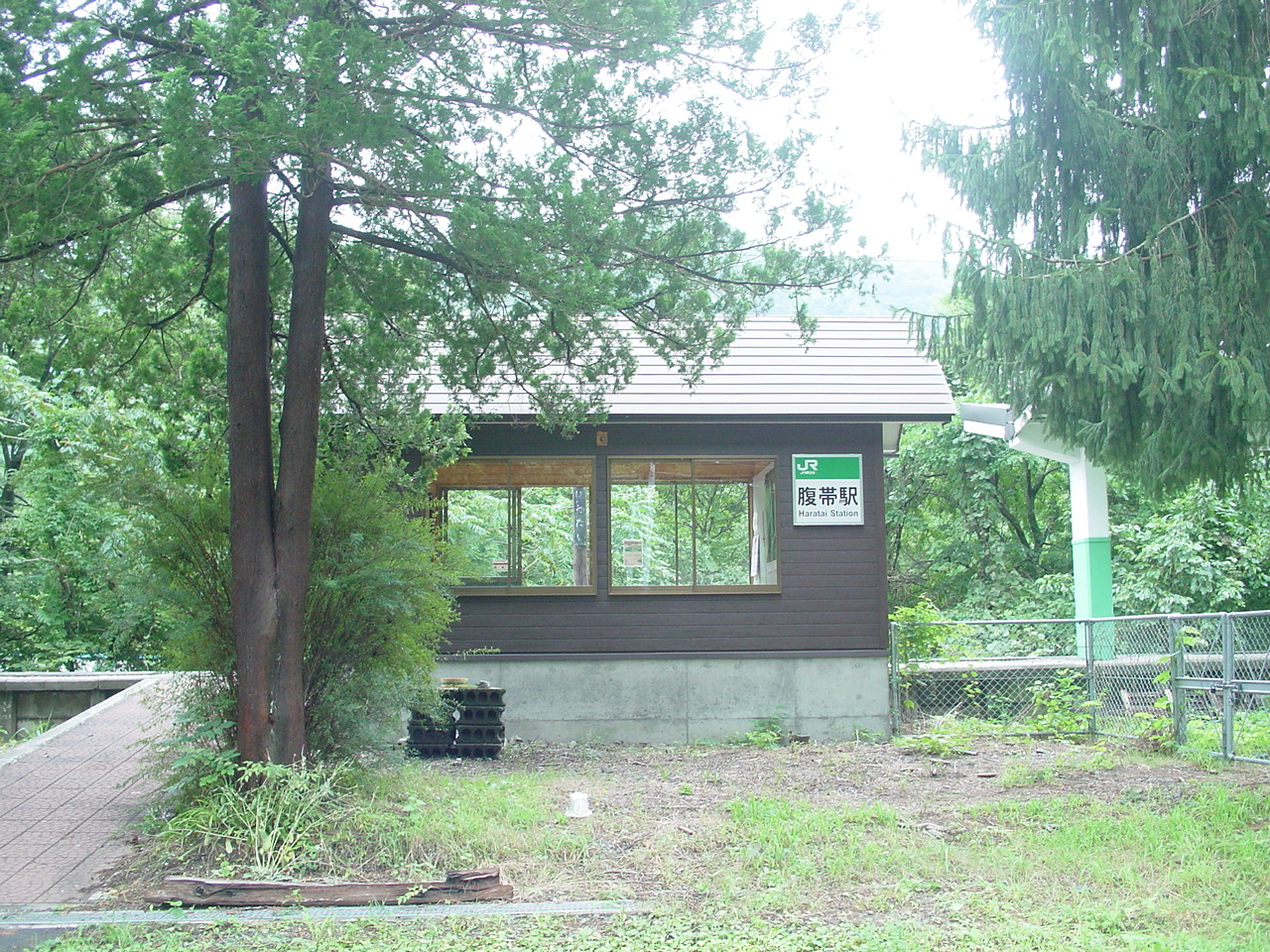
- Haratai Station, September 2007

General information
- Location: Haratai 1-49, Miyako-shi, Iwate-ken 28-2103; Japan
- Coordinates: 39.6047°N 141.7672°E
- Operator: JR East
- Line: ■ Yamada Line
- Distance: 82.6 km from Morioka
- Platforms: 1 side platform
- Tracks: 1

Construction
- Structure type: At grade

Other information
- Status: Unstaffed
- Website: Official website

History
- Opened: 6 November 1934

Services
Preceding station	JR East	Following station
Rikuchū-Kawai towards Morioka	Yamada Line Local	Moichi towards Miyako
Location
- Location within Japan

Haratai Station (腹帯駅, Haratai-eki) is a railway station on the Yamada Line in the city of Miyako, Iwate, Japan, operated by East Japan Railway Company (JR East).

== Lines ==
Haratai Station is served by the Yamada Line, and is located 82.6 rail kilometers from the terminus of the line at Morioka Station.

== Station layout ==
Haratai Station has a single side platform serving a single bidirectional track. There is no longer a station building, but only a waiting room built on the platform. The station is unattended.

== History ==
Haratai Station opened on 6 November 1934. The station was closed from 26 November 1946 to 21 November 1954. The station was absorbed into the JR East network upon the privatization of the Japanese National Railways (JNR) on 1 April 1987.

== Surrounding area ==
- Japan National Route 106

== See also ==
- List of railway stations in Japan
