= Hikime Station =

Railway station in Miyako, Iwate Prefecture, Japan

Hikime Station 蟇目駅
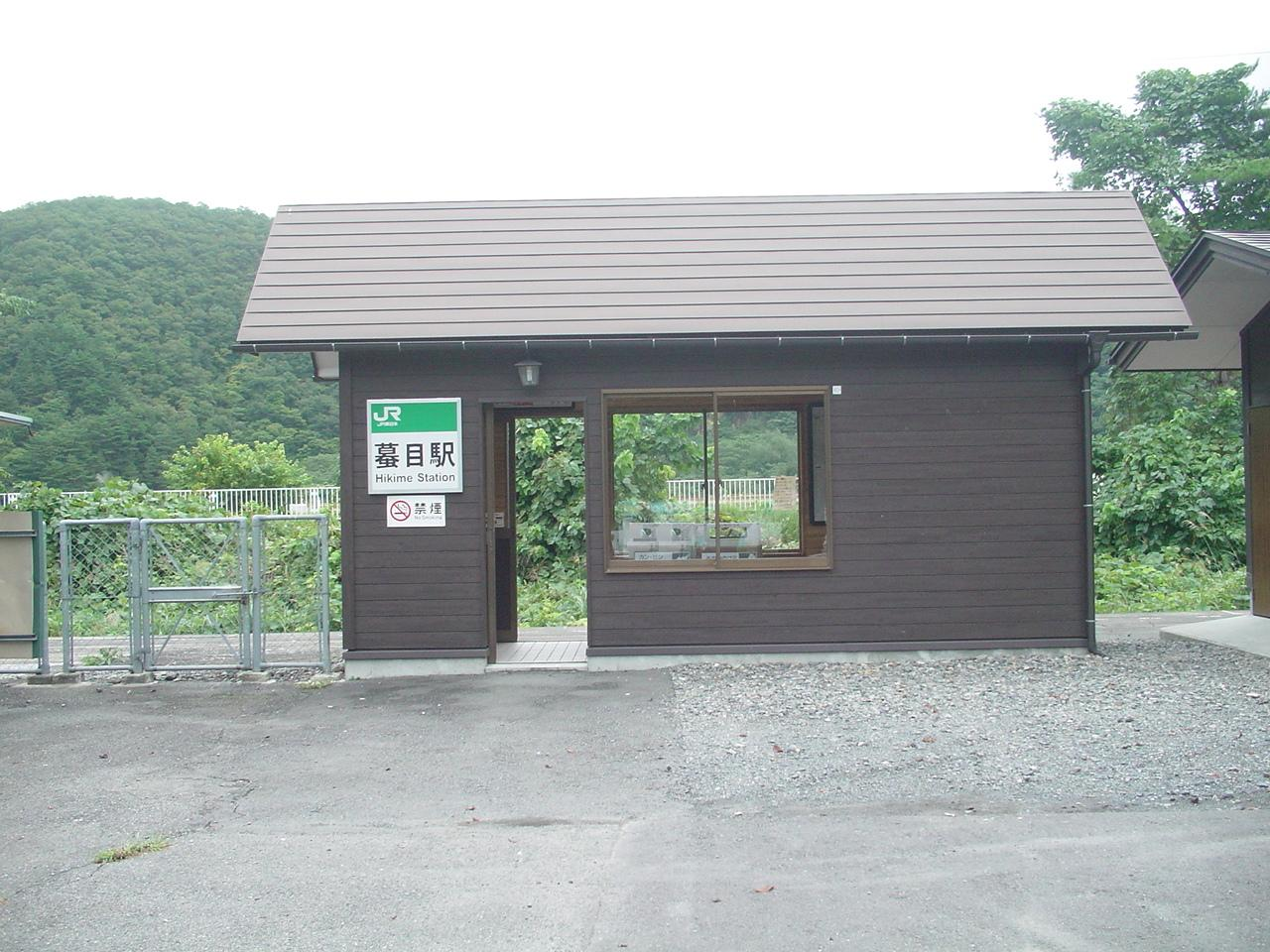
- Hikime Station, September 2007

General information
- Location: Hikime 12, Miyako-shi, Iwate-ken 028-2102; Japan
- Coordinates: 39.6294°N 141.8390°E
- Operator: JR East
- Line: ■ Yamada Line
- Distance: 91.5 km from Morioka
- Platforms: 1 side platform
- Tracks: 1

Construction
- Structure type: At grade

Other information
- Status: Unstaffed
- Website: Official website

History
- Opened: 6 November 1934

Services
Preceding station	JR East	Following station
Moichi towards Morioka	Yamada Line Local	Kebaraichi towards Miyako
Location
- Location within Japan

Hikime Station (蟇目駅, Hikime-eki) is a railway station on the Yamada Line in the city of Miyako, Iwate, Japan, operated by East Japan Railway Company (JR East).

== Lines ==
Hikime Station is served by the Yamada Line, and is located 91.5 rail kilometers from the terminus of the line at Morioka Station.

== Station layout ==
Hikime Station has a single side platform serving a single bi-directional track. There is no longer a station building, but only a waiting room built on the platform. The station is unattended.

== History ==
Hikime Station opened on 6 November 1934. The station was closed from 26 November 1946 to 3 November 1949. The station was absorbed into the JR East network upon the privatization of the Japanese National Railways (JNR) on 1 April 1987.

== Surrounding area ==
- Japan National Route 106
- List of railway stations in Japan
