= Iwate-Kariya Station =

Railway station in Miyako, Iwate, Japan

Coordinates: 39.6427°N 141.7593°E

Iwate-Kariya Station 岩手刈屋駅
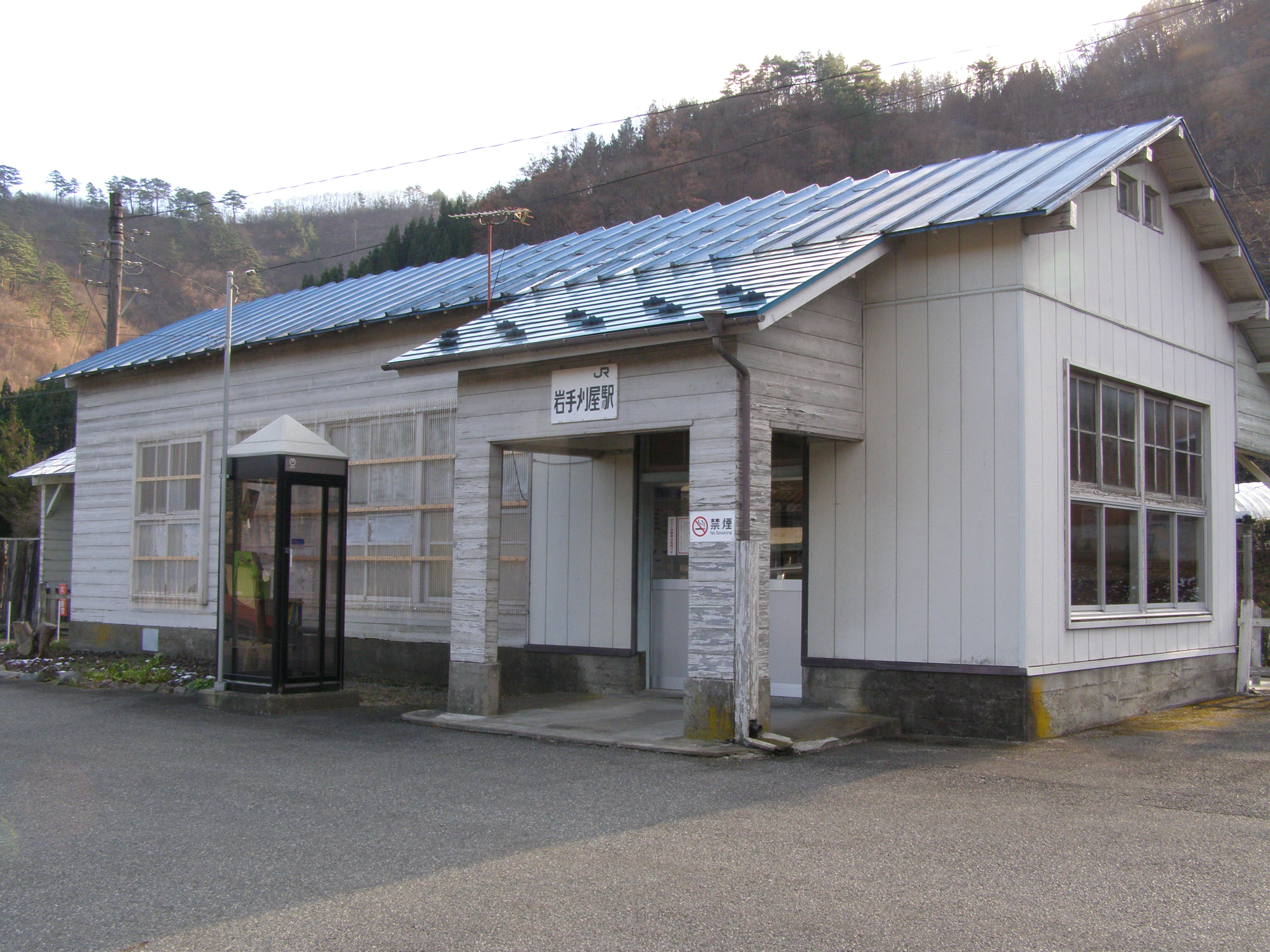
- Iwate-Kariya Station, April 2007

General information
- Location: Kariya dai-13 jiwari 25, Miyako, Iwate （岩手県宮古市刈屋第13地割25） Japan
- Operator: JR East
- Line: Iwaizumi Line

History
- Opened: 1942
- Closed: 2014

Former services
Preceding station	JR East	Following station
Nakasato towards Iwaizumi	Iwaizumi Line	Moichi Terminus
Location

Iwate-Kariya Station (岩手刈屋駅, Iwate-Kariya-eki) was a railway station on the Iwaizumi Line in Miyako, Japan, operated by East Japan Railway Company (JR East).

== Lines ==
Iwate-Kariya Station was a station on the Iwaizumi Line, and was located 4.3 rail kilometers from the opposing terminus of the line at Moichi Station.

== Station layout ==
Iwate-Kariya Station had a single side platform serving traffic in both directions. The station was unattended.

== History ==
Iwate-Kariya Station opened on 25 June 1942. The station was absorbed into the JR East network upon the privatization of the Japanese National Railways (JNR) on 1 April 1987. The operation of the Iwaizumi Line was suspended from July 2010 and the line was officially closed on 1 April 2014.

== Surrounding area ==
- Japan National Route 340
- Kariya Post Office
