= Akkadō =

Cave in Iwate Prefecture, Japan

Coordinates: 39°59′1.1″N 141°44′10.05″E

- 安家洞
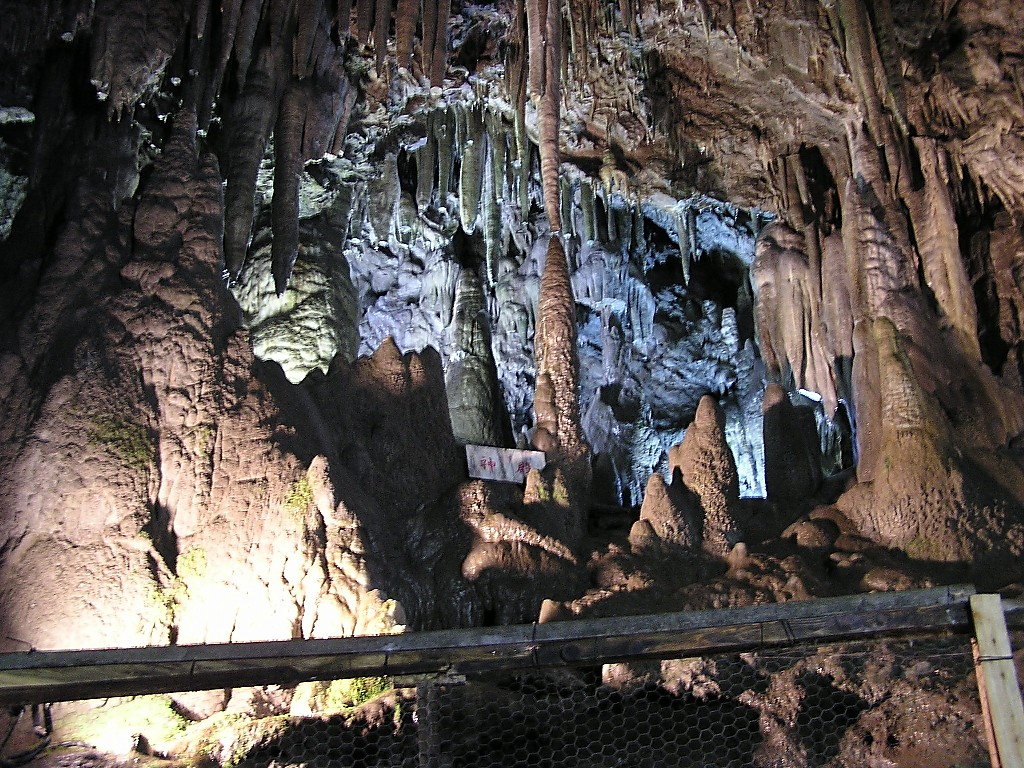
- Inside the Akkadō

- Location within Iwate Prefecture
- Location: Iwaizumi, Iwate Prefecture, Japan
- Depth: 280 meters
- Length: 23,702 meters
- Geology: limestone
- Access: public
- Show cave length: 700 meters
- Website: Official website

Akkadō (安家洞), located in Iwaizumi, Iwate Prefecture, in the Tōhoku region of northern Japan, is the longest limestone cavern in Japan, with a measured length of 23,702 metres (77,762 ft). The cave system was designated as a natural monument by the Japanese government in 1980. Since 1991, a portion of the caverns have been open to the public for part of the year.

== Outline ==
There are flowstones and a subterranean lake.

== Access ==
- Iwaizumi Town Bus
  - From/to Iwaizumibashi
