= Nakasato Station (Iwate) =

Former railway station in Japan

Coordinates: 39°39′43″N 141°44′10″E

Nakasato Station 中里駅
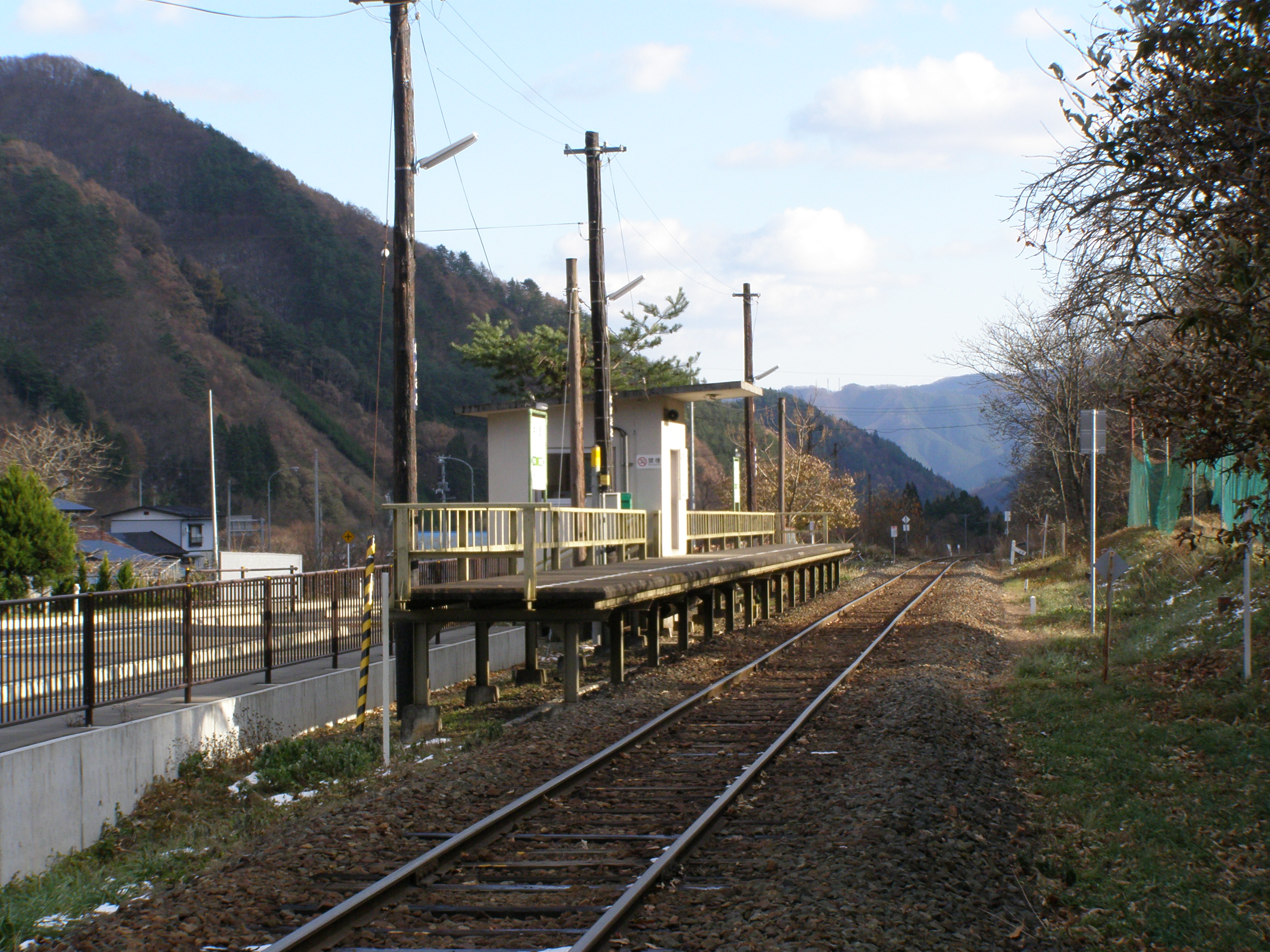
- Nakasato Station, January 2007

General information
- Location: Kariya dai-14 jiwari, Miyako, Iwate （岩手県宮古市刈屋第14地割） Japan
- Operator: JR East
- Line: Iwaizumi Line

History
- Opened: 1966
- Closed: 2014

Former services
Preceding station	JR East	Following station
Iwate-Wainai towards Iwaizumi	Iwaizumi Line	Iwate-Kariya towards Moichi
Location

Nakasato Station (中里駅, Nakasato-eki) was a railway station on the Iwaizumi Line in Miyako, Japan, operated by East Japan Railway Company (JR East).

== Lines ==
Nakasato Station was a station on the Iwaizumi Line, located 7.2 rail kilometers from the opposing terminus of the line at Moichi Station.

== Station layout ==
Nakasato Station had a single side platform serving traffic in both directions. The station had no building and was unattended.

== History ==
Nakasato Station opened on 1 October 1966. The station was absorbed into the JR East network upon the privatization of the Japanese National Railways (JNR) on 1 April 1987. The operation of the Iwaizumi Line was suspended from July 2010 and the line was officially closed on 1 April 2014.

== Surrounding area ==
- Kariya River
