= Mount Nasu =

Group of complex volcanoes on the island of Honshu

- 那須岳
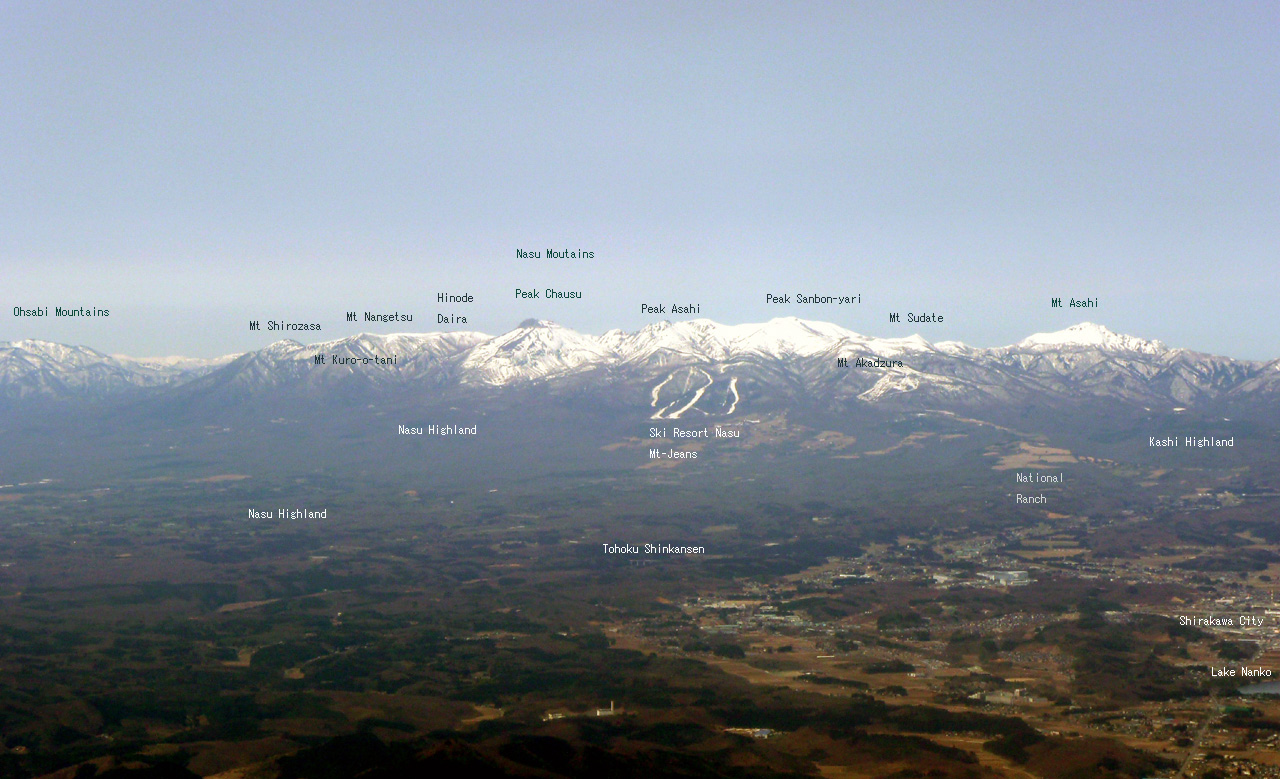
- Nasu Mountains

Highest point
- Peak: Sanbonyari Peak
- Elevation: 1,916.9 m (6,289 ft)
- Prominence: 1,009 m (3,310 ft)
- Listing: Mountains of Japan, Ribu
- Coordinates: 37°09′N 139°57′E

Naming
- Language of name: Japanese

Geography
- Location within Japan
- Location: On the border of Nasushiohara and Nasu of Tochigi Prefecture, Nishigō, Nishishirakawa of Fukushima Prefecture, Japan
- Parent range: Ōu Mountains

Geology
- Mountain type: Complex volcano
- Volcanic arc: Northeastern Japan Arc
- Last eruption: November 1963

Mount Nasu (那須岳, Nasu-dake) is a group of complex volcanoes located in the northeast part of Nikkō National Park, Japan. The tallest peak is Sanbonyari Peak at a height of 1,916.9 m (6,289 ft). Mount Nasu is one of the 100 Famous Japanese Mountains.

== Major peaks ==
Mount Nasu has the following major peaks:

- Sanbonyari Peak – 1916.9 m
- Chausu Peak – 1915 m
- Asahi Peak – 1896 m
- Minamigatsusan – 1776 m
- Kuro-oya Peak – 1589 m

These peaks are known collectively as Nasu Five Peaks (那須5岳, Nasu-Go-Take).

== Climate ==
Climate data for Mount Nasu (1991−2020 normals, extremes 1976−present)
Month	Jan	Feb	Mar	Apr	May	Jun	Jul	Aug	Sep	Oct	Nov	Dec	Year
Record high °C (°F)	12.7 (54.9)	16.8 (62.2)	21.1 (70.0)	26.8 (80.2)	29.6 (85.3)	30.3 (86.5)	31.8 (89.2)	32.2 (90.0)	29.5 (85.1)	24.6 (76.3)	20.0 (68.0)	17.4 (63.3)	32.2 (90.0)
Mean daily maximum °C (°F)	1.9 (35.4)	2.7 (36.9)	6.8 (44.2)	13.0 (55.4)	18.2 (64.8)	20.7 (69.3)	24.3 (75.7)	25.4 (77.7)	21.4 (70.5)	16.1 (61.0)	10.9 (51.6)	5.1 (41.2)	13.9 (57.0)
Daily mean °C (°F)	−1.7 (28.9)	−1.3 (29.7)	2.0 (35.6)	7.8 (46.0)	13.0 (55.4)	16.4 (61.5)	20.2 (68.4)	21.0 (69.8)	17.3 (63.1)	11.8 (53.2)	6.4 (43.5)	1.1 (34.0)	9.5 (49.1)
Mean daily minimum °C (°F)	−5.3 (22.5)	−5.3 (22.5)	−2.4 (27.7)	2.6 (36.7)	7.7 (45.9)	12.3 (54.1)	16.7 (62.1)	17.5 (63.5)	13.8 (56.8)	7.7 (45.9)	2.0 (35.6)	−2.6 (27.3)	5.4 (41.7)
Record low °C (°F)	−11.7 (10.9)	−12.1 (10.2)	−10.4 (13.3)	−6.0 (21.2)	−2.3 (27.9)	3.6 (38.5)	8.7 (47.7)	8.9 (48.0)	3.2 (37.8)	−1.2 (29.8)	−6.1 (21.0)	−10.2 (13.6)	−12.1 (10.2)
Average precipitation mm (inches)	52.6 (2.07)	42.8 (1.69)	101.6 (4.00)	139.6 (5.50)	180.8 (7.12)	220.5 (8.68)	305.7 (12.04)	303.9 (11.96)	305.3 (12.02)	212.6 (8.37)	89.2 (3.51)	60.1 (2.37)	2,014.7 (79.33)
Average snowfall cm (inches)	103 (41)	79 (31)	45 (18)	7 (2.8)	0 (0)	0 (0)	0 (0)	0 (0)	0 (0)	0 (0)	4 (1.6)	55 (22)	293 (116.4)
Average precipitation days (≥ 1.0 mm)	9.1	8.3	10.4	11.3	12.1	15.9	18.3	17.0	14.8	11.5	8.3	9.1	146.1
Average snowy days (≥ 1 cm)	11.5	8.8	5.5	0.6	0	0	0	0	0	0	0.4	5.9	32.7
Mean monthly sunshine hours	131.0	129.0	156.4	170.4	169.1	108.8	98.7	115.3	98.9	115.1	130.1	132.6	1,555.2
Source 1: JMA
Source 2: JMA

== Eruption ==
It is estimated that Mount Nasu started erupting 600 thousand years ago. The eruption started from the north end of the mountain range, at Kashi-Asahi Peak. Only Chausu Peak is active today.

== Access ==
- Nasu Sancho Station of Nasu Ropeway
- Sandogoya Onsen Bus Stop of Kanto Transportation

== Gallery ==
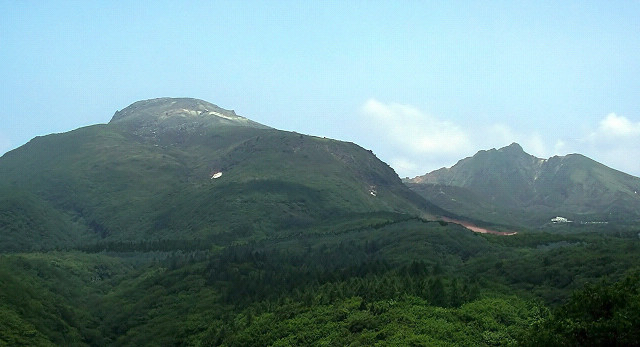
Chausu lava dome and Asahi Peak

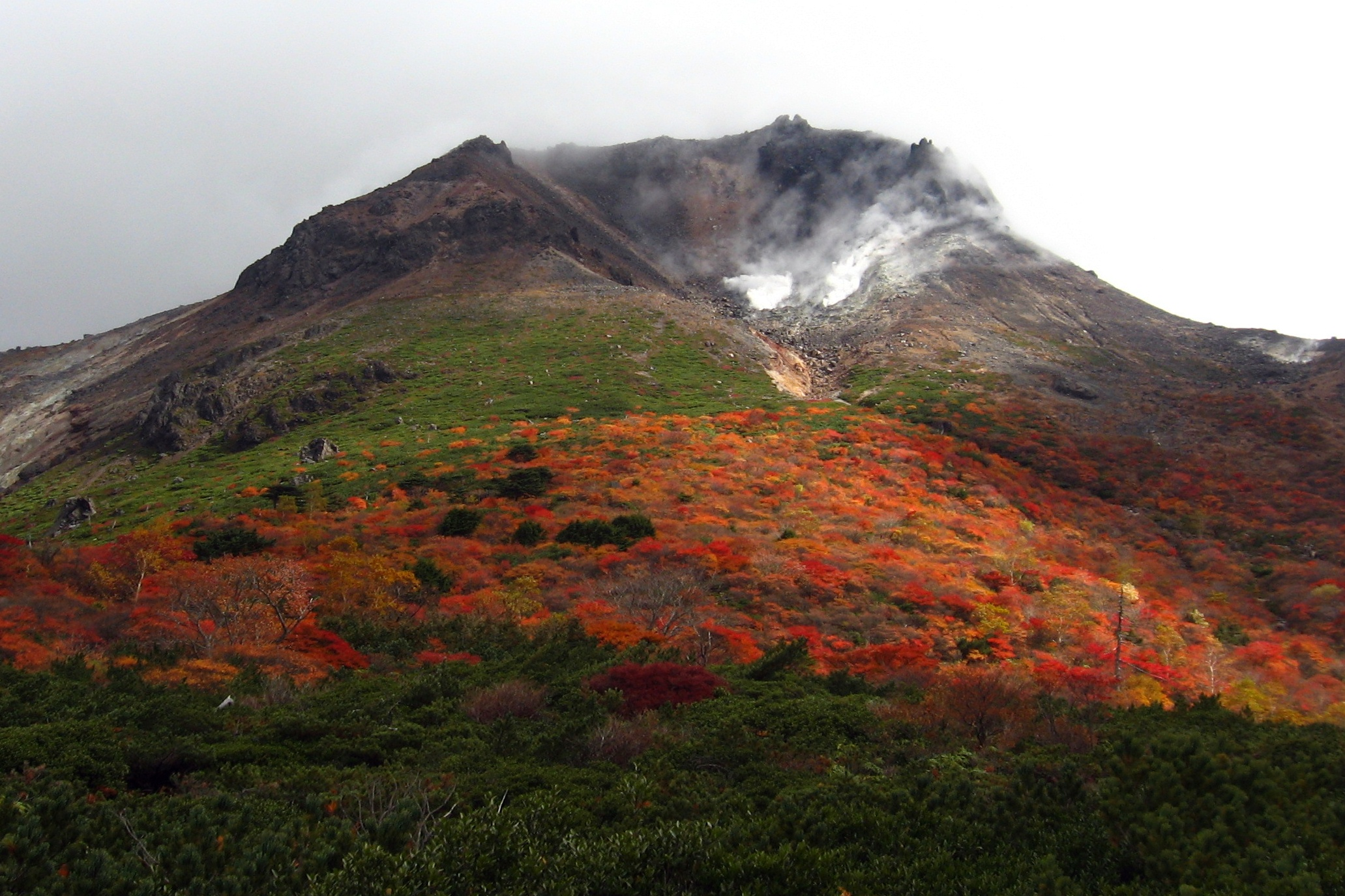
Chausu lava dome and fumes

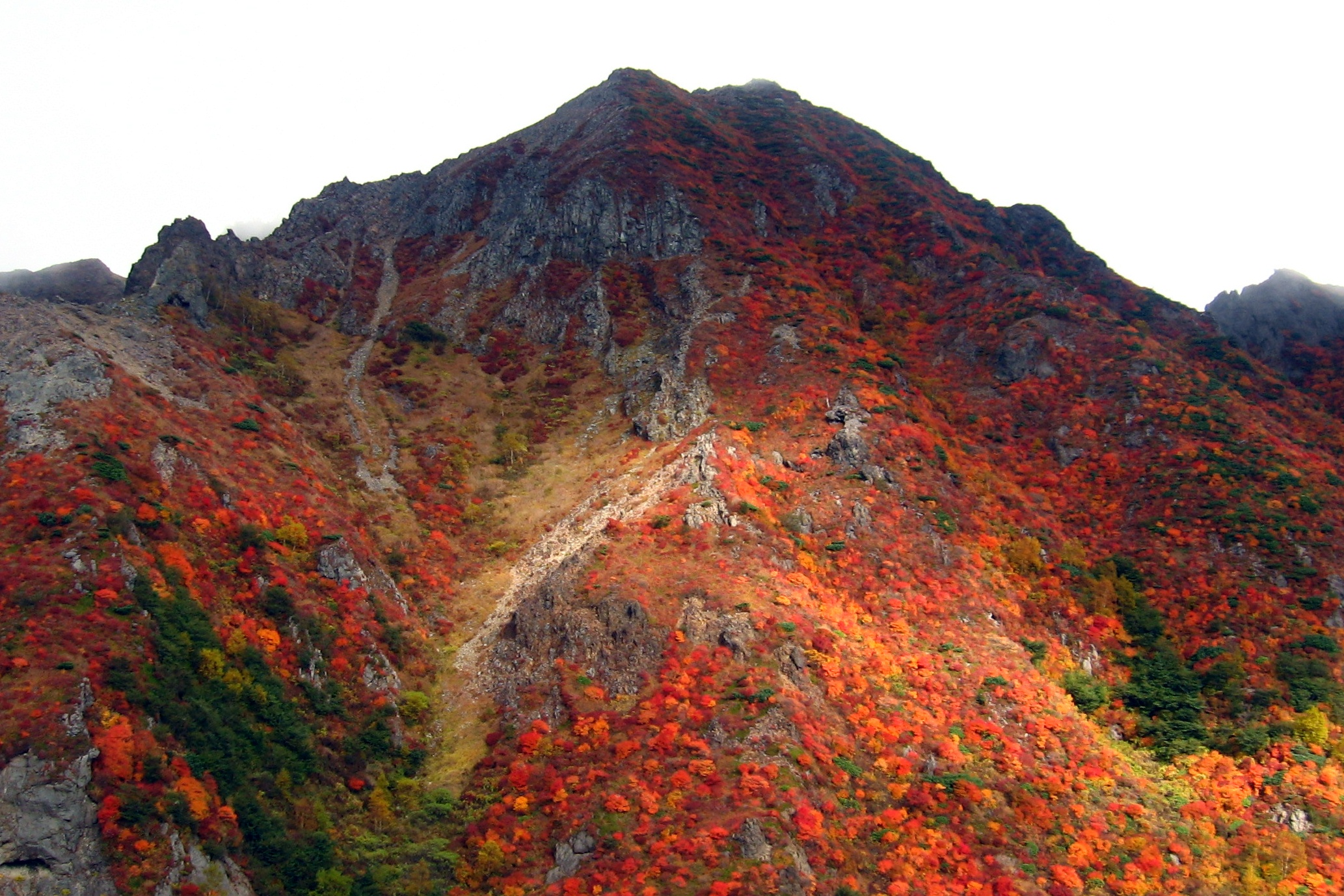
Asahi Peak

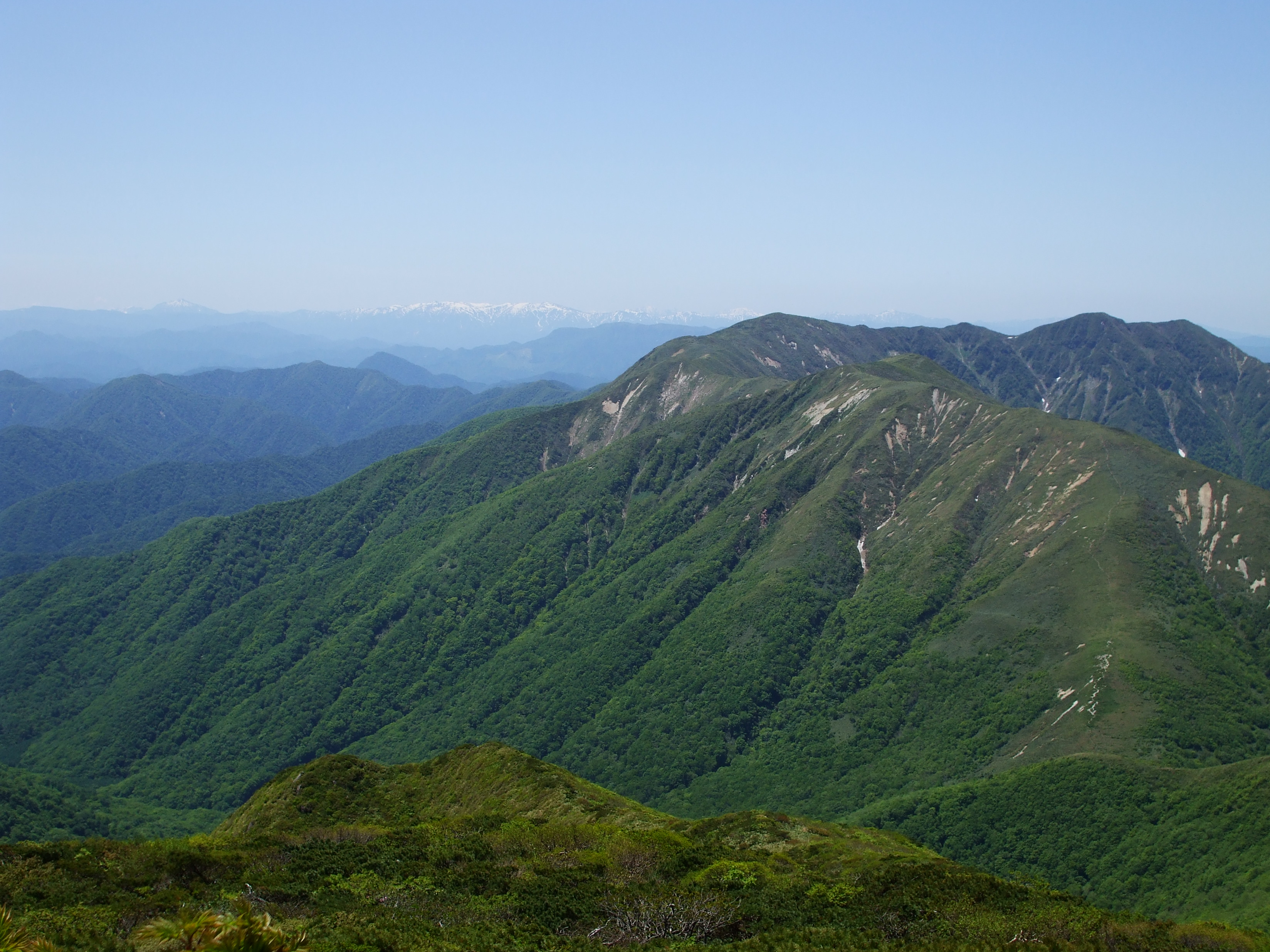
West view from Sanbonyari Peak

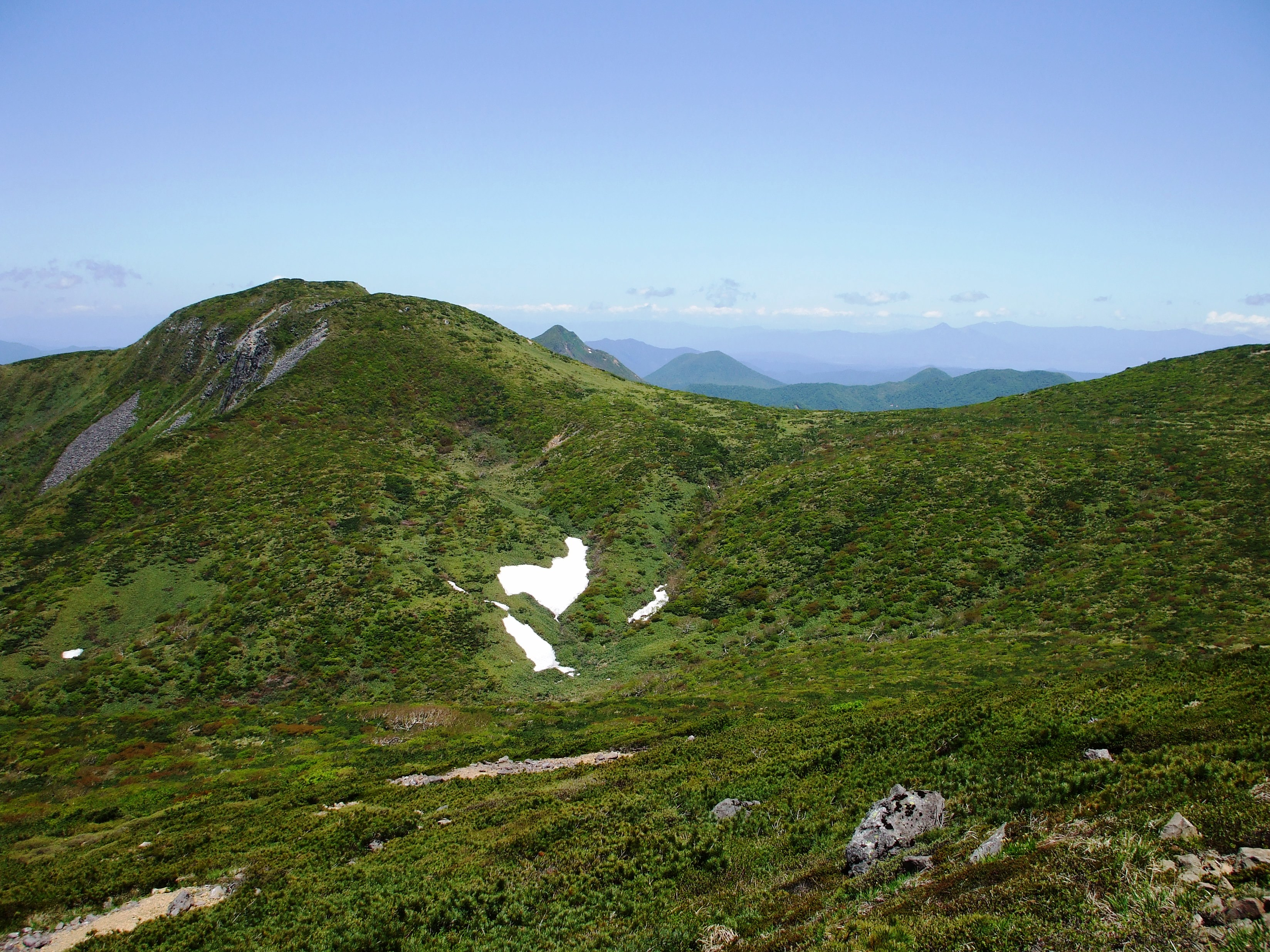
Sanbonyari Peak and snow in summer

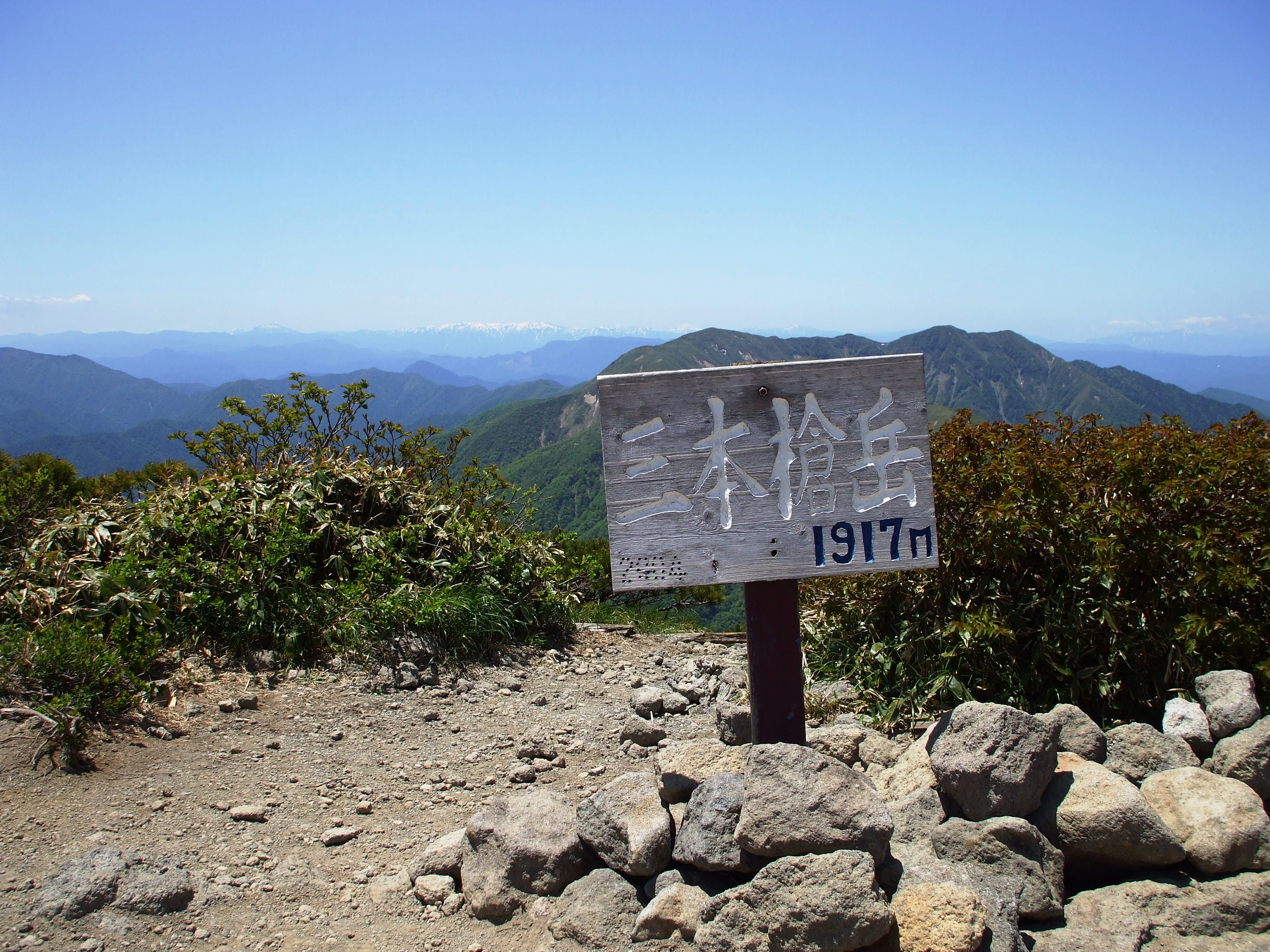
At the Sanbonyari Peak

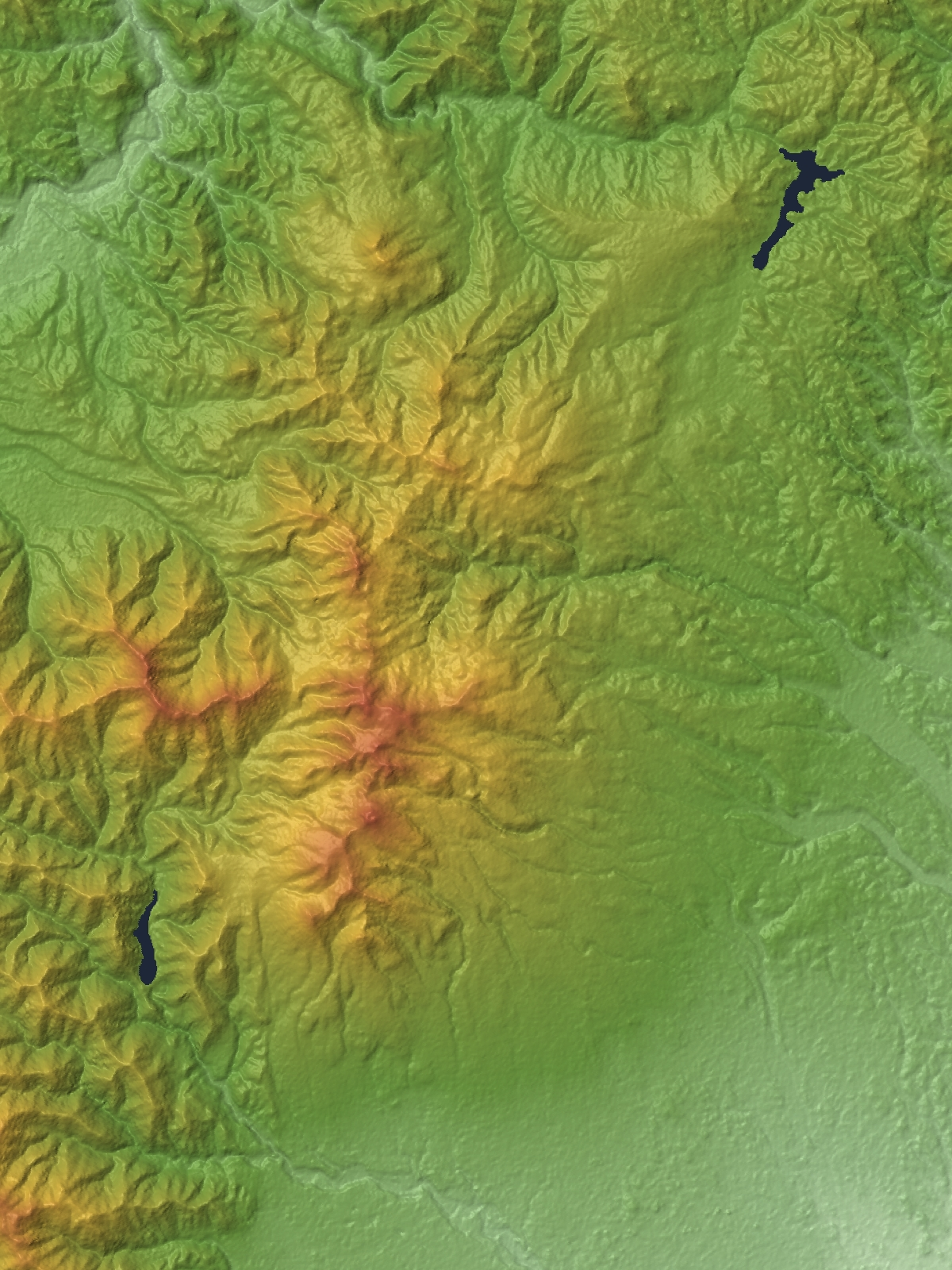
Topographic map

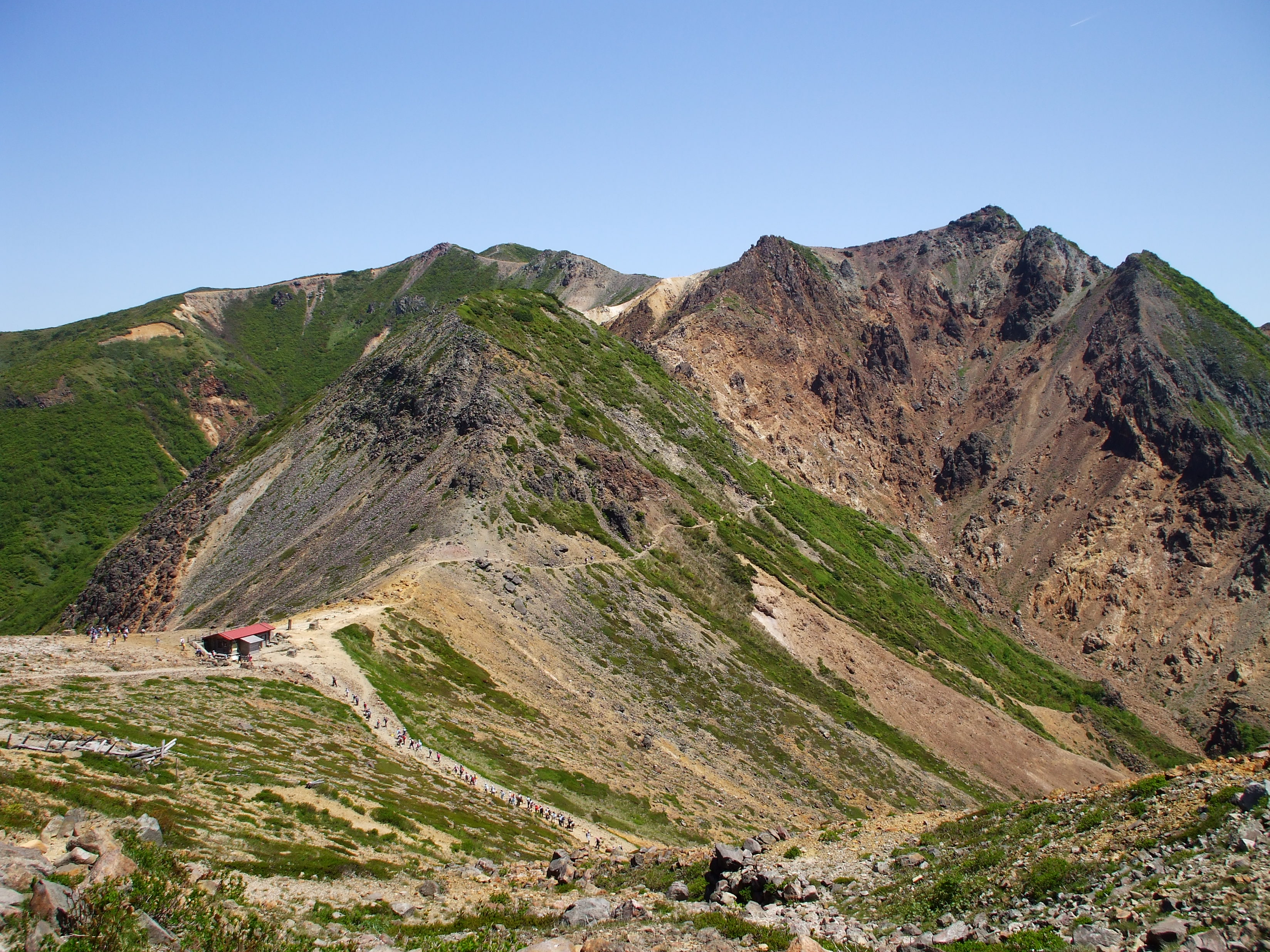
To Asahi Peak
