= Moichi Station =

Railway station in Miyako, Iwate Prefecture, Japan

Moichi Station 茂市駅
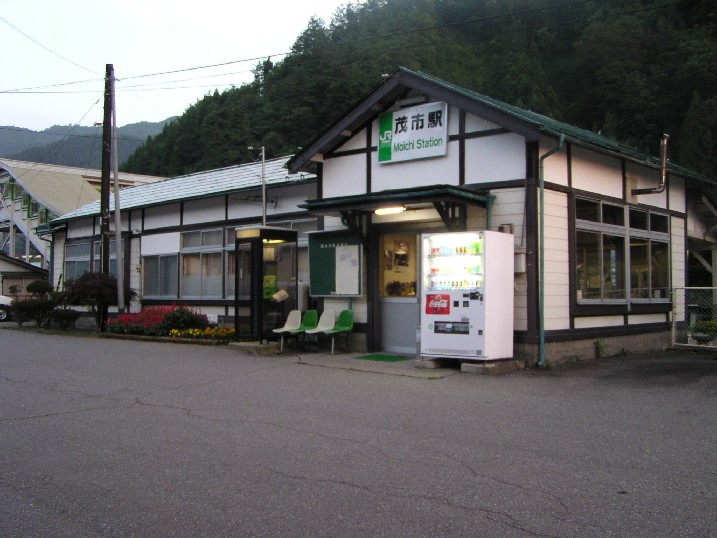
- Moichi Station in August 2006

General information
- Location: Moichi Dai-san jiwari 159-9, Miyako-shi, Iwate-ken 028-2101; Japan
- Coordinates: 39°37′14″N 141°47′58″E
- Operator: JR East
- Line: ■ Yamada Line
- Distance: 87.0 km from Morioka
- Platforms: 1 island platform
- Tracks: 2

Other information
- Status: Unstaffed
- Website: Official website

History
- Opened: 8 November 1934

Passengers
- FY2017: 38 (daily)

Services
Preceding station	JR East	Following station
Rikuchū-Kawai towards Morioka	Yamada Line Rapid Rias	Sentoku towards Miyako
Haratai towards Morioka	Yamada Line Local	Hikime towards Miyako
Former services
Preceding station	JR East	Following station
Iwate-Kariya towards Iwaizumi	Iwaizumi Line	Terminus
Location
- Location within Japan

Moichi Station (茂市駅, Moichi-eki) is a railway station on the Yamada Line in the city of Miyako, Iwate, Japan, operated by the East Japan Railway Company (JR East).

== Lines ==
Moichi Station is served by the Yamada Line, and is located 87.0 kilometers from the terminus of the line at Morioka Station. It was also a terminal station for the Iwaizumi Line, until its operations were suspended on 31 July 2010 due to a landslide, and the line was closed on 1 April 2014, due to very low public demand.

== Station layout ==
Moichi Station has a one island platform and two tracks. connecting to station building by a footbridge. The station is Unstaffed from 2018.

=== Platforms ===
1-2	■ Yamada Line	for Miyako
3	■ Yamada Line	for Rikuchū-Kawai and Morioka

== History ==
Moichi Station opened on 6 November 1934. The Iwaizumi Line began operations from 25 June 1942. The station was closed from 26 November 1946 to 5 March 1949.

The station was absorbed into the JR East network upon the privatization of the Japanese National Railways (JNR) on 1 April 1987.

Operations on the Iwaizumi Line were suspended on 31 July 2010, due to a landslide, and the line was officially closed on 1 April 2014, with services replaced by buses.

== Passenger statistics ==
In fiscal 2015, the station was used by an average of 53 passengers daily (boarding passengers only).

== Bus routes ==
- Higashinihon Kotsu
  - For Iwaizumi bashi
  - For Miyako Station
- Niisato Community Bus
  - For Hikime Station
  - For Kyu-Kariya Station
  - For Haratai Station
- Northern Iwate Transportation
  - For Morioka Station
  - For Miyako Station

== Surrounding area ==
Moichi Station is a small station deep in the mountains.

- National Route 106
- National Route 340

== See also ==
- List of railway stations in Japan
