= Iwaizumi Station =

Former railway station in Japan

Coordinates: 39°50′42″N 141°47′12″E

Iwaizumi 岩泉
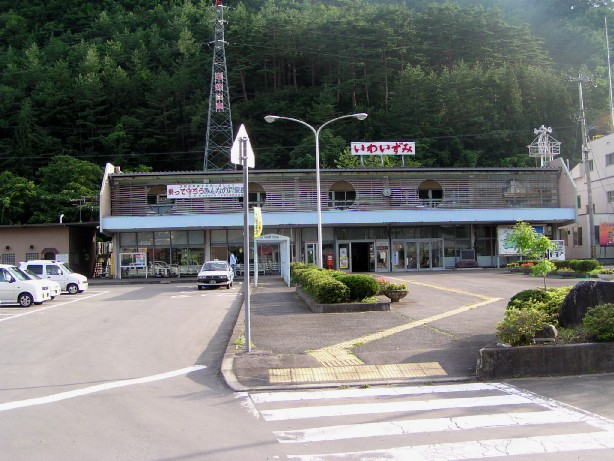
- Iwaizumi Station, September 2007

General information
- Location: Nakano, Iwaizumi, Iwate （岩手県下閉伊郡岩泉町中野） Japan
- Operator: JR East
- Line: Iwaizumi Line

History
- Opened: 1972
- Closed: 2014

Former services
Preceding station	JR East	Following station
Terminus	Iwaizumi Line	Nishōishi towards Moichi
Location

Iwaizumi Station (岩泉駅, Iwaizumi-eki) was a railway station on the Iwaizumi Line in Iwaizumi, Iwate, Japan, operated by East Japan Railway Company (JR East).

== Lines ==
Iwaizumi Station was the terminus of the Iwaizumi Line, and was located 38.4 rail kilometers from the starting point of the line at Moichi Station.

== Station layout ==
The station had a single side platform serving traffic in both directions, connected to a two-story station building. The platform was designed as an island platform as there were plans to connect the station to the Kita Rias Line, but no track was laid on one side of the platform.

== History ==
Iwaizumi Station opened on 6 February 1972. The station was absorbed into the JR East network upon the privatization of the Japanese National Railways (JNR) on 1 April 1987. Operations on the Iwaizumi Line were suspended from July 2010, due to a landslide, and the line was officially closed on 1 April 2014, owing to declining passenger use.

== Passenger statistics ==
In fiscal 2010, the station was used by an average of 14 passengers daily (boarding passengers only). The passenger figures for previous years are as shown below.

Fiscal year	Daily average
2000	42
2005	44
2010	14

== Surrounding area ==
- Iwaizumi Town Hall
- Iwaizumi Post Office

== Bus Stop ==
Below-mentioned bullet point summary are bus routes and destinations.

=== Iwaizumi bashi bus stop ===
This bus stop is passed through by Northern Iwate Transportation, Higashinihon Kotsu and JR Bus Tohoku.

- Hayasaka Kogen Line (JR Bus Tohoku)
  - For Morioka Station
- Iwaizumi-Moichi Line (Higashinihon Kotsu)
  - For Miyako Station via Moichi Station
- A45 (Northern Iwate Transportation)
  - For Iwaizumi-Omoto Station

Iwaizumi Town Bus

- Kokkyo Arasawa Line
  - For Kami-Kokkyo
- Akkadō Line
  - For Akkadō
- Sawanaka-Natsubushi Line
  - For Muroba
