= Tobu Bus Nikko =

Public transit company in Nikko, Tochigi prefecture, Japan

Tobu Bus Co., Ltd.
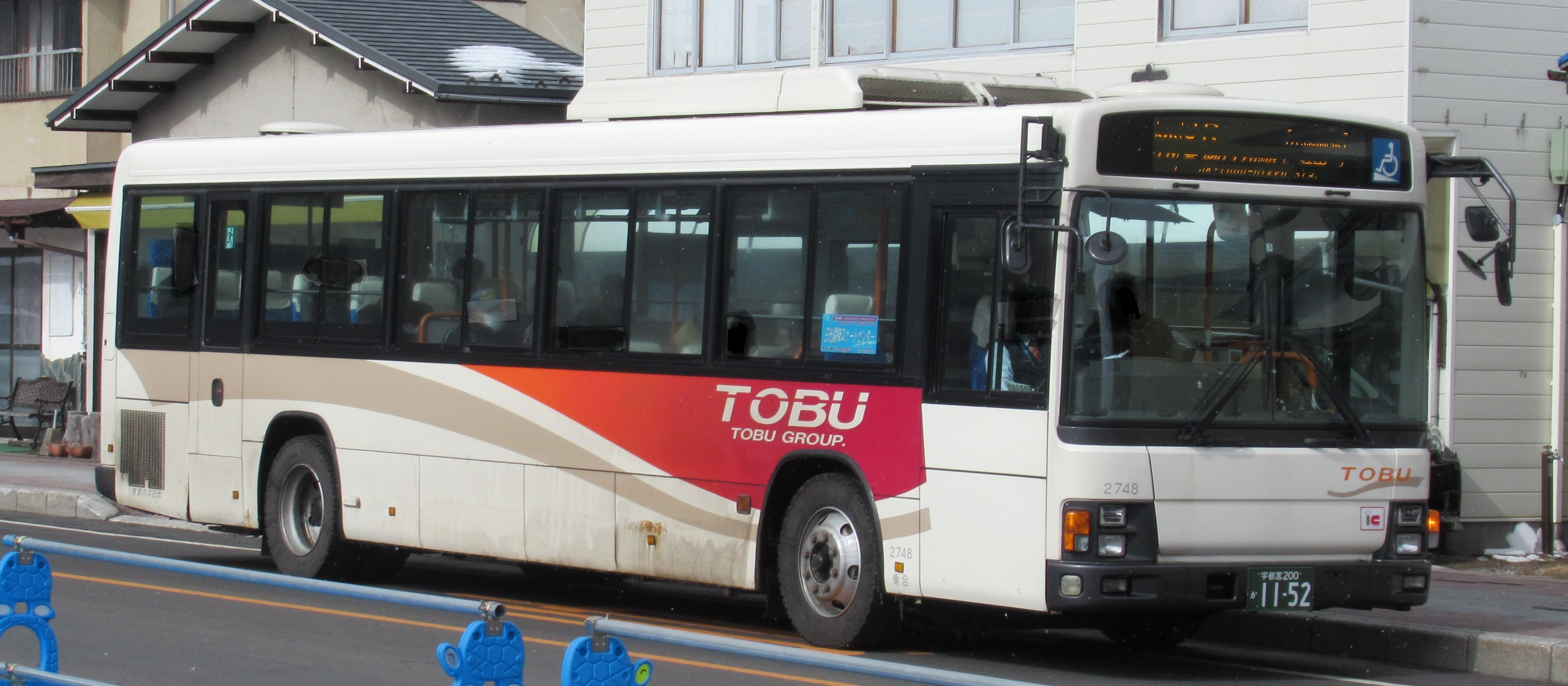
- Isuzu Erga （Commonly used vehicle model on Tobu routes）
- Parent: Tobu Bus
- Founded: 4 April 2002
- Headquarters: 1452 Tokorono, Nikko, Tochigi, Japan
- Service area: Tochigi
- Service type: Bus
- Routes: Route map
- Fleet: 35 buses
- Chief executive: 槇田 浩昭
- Website: Tobu Bus Nikko (in Japanese)

The Tobu Bus Nikko Co., Ltd. (東武バス日光株式会社, Tōbu Basu Nikkō Kabushiki-gaisha) is a subsidiary company of Tōbu Bus.

== Outline ==
In 2002, Tōbu Railway was split into a railway company and a bus company. The bus company was further divided into Tōbu Bus Nikkō, Tōbu Bus West, Tōbu Bus East (discontinued in 2022), and Tōbu Bus Central. Tōbu Bus Nikkō operates all routes in the area around Nikkō Station and Tōbu-Nikkō Station in Nikko, Tochigi. The area served by these bus routes includes many tourist destinations, such as Tōshō-gū, Chūzenji, and Rinnō-ji.

== Vehicles ==
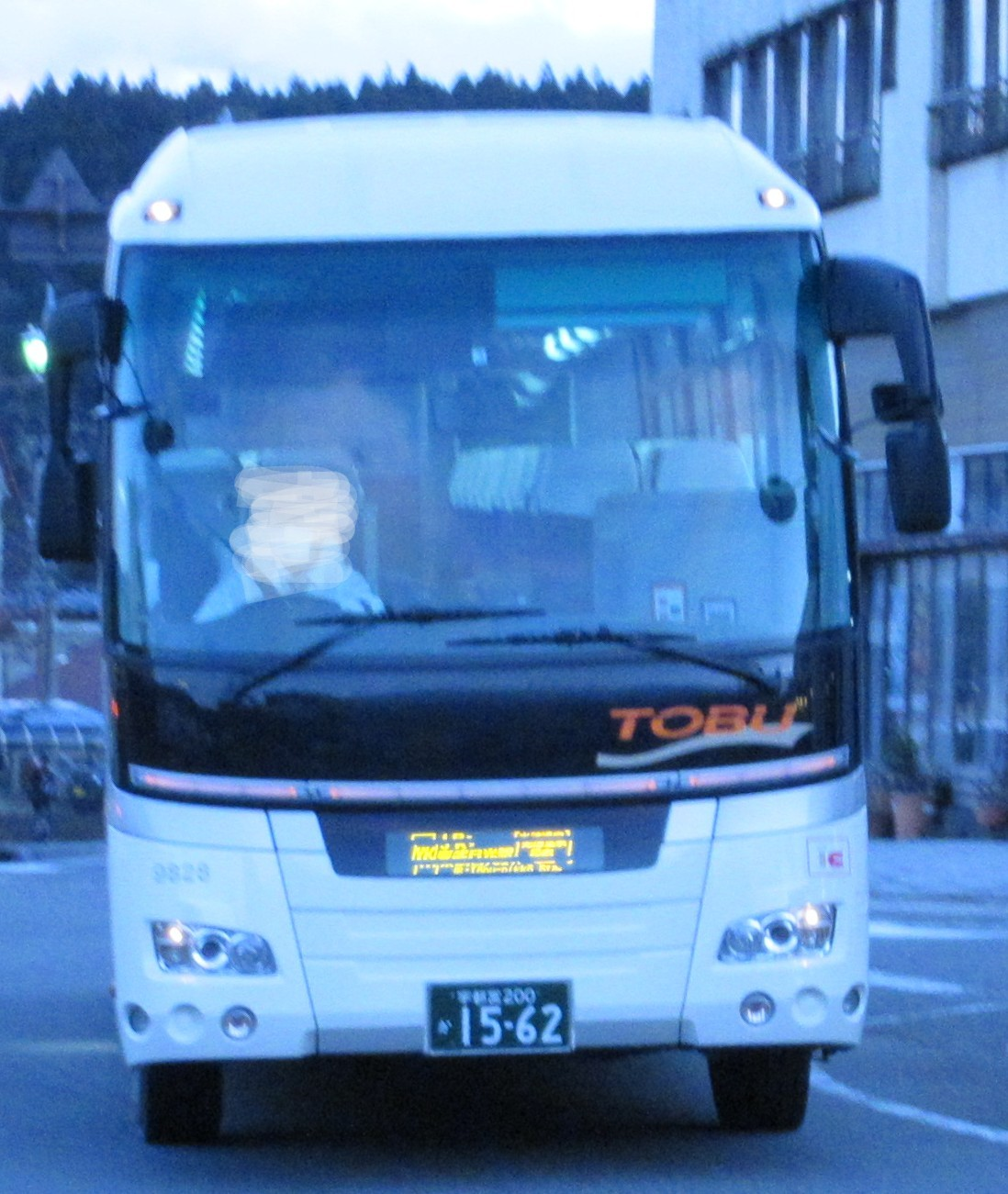
Hino S'elega, a type of sightseeing bus used for highway transit and during the tourist season

The company primarily uses Hino Rainbow and Isuzu Erga models, which are types of stage carriage buses. The Isuzu Erga was introduced as a "two-seater" in 2012 as part of the company's efforts to improve accessibility for disabled passengers. Due to demand for sightseeing buses that require warm interiors in winter, the company also makes use of the Hino S'elega.

The buses can be accessed via doors in the front or middle of the bus, with the exception of the sightseeing buses, which only feature a door in the front.

== Offices ==
- Nikkō office
- Chūzenji information desk

== Highway buses ==
Starting	Via	Terminus	Note
Kinugawa-Onsen Station	Tōbu-Nikkō Station・Shimo-Imaichi Station・Sano S.A. (rest stop)・Haneda Airport	Yokohama Station	Operated with Keihin Kyuko Bus since 10 February 2018.

== Tickets ==
Tickets for riding the bus are sold at information desks at Tōbu Nikkō Station, Chūzenji Onsen, and Yumoto Onsen.

=== Normal tickets ===
- Normal tickets are single-use, with a designated destination.
- Tickets for destinations between Tōbu-Nikkō Station and Yumoto Onsen allow passengers to get on and off freely between the Shinkyo bus stop near Tōshō-gū and the Chūzenji Onsen bus-stop near Lake Chūzenji.

=== Free pass tickets ===
Free pass tickets allow purchasers to get on and off at any of the bus stops within the designated area of the ticket, and are almost all available for two days, though there are exceptions.

- Yumoto Onsen Free Pass – Can be used at Nikkō Station, Tōbu-Nikkō Station, the Shinkyo bus stop (tōshō-gū), Umakaeshi, the Chūzenji Onsen bus stop (Lake Chūzenji), Yumoto Onsen, and for the World Heritage Sightseeing Bus (世界遺産めぐり循環バス).
- Chūzenji Onsen Free Pass – Can be used at Nikkō Station, Tōbu-Nikkō Station, the Shinkyo bus stop (tōshō-gū), Umakaeshi, the Chūzenji Onsen bus stop (Lake Chūzenji), the Osaki bus stop, and for the World Heritage Sightseeing Bus.
- Senjōgahara Free Pass – Can be used at Nikkō Station, Tōbu-Nikkō Station, the Shinkyo bus stop (tōshō-gū), Umakaeshi, the Chūzenji Onsen bus stop (Lake Chūzenji), the Sanbonmatsu bus stop, for the World Heritage Sightseeing Bus.
- Ozasa Bokujō Free Pass – Can be used at Nikkō Station, Tōbu-Nikkō Station, Kirifuri Falls, Kirifuri Kōgen, Ozasa Bokujō, and for the World Heritage Sightseeing Bus.
- Kirifuri Kōgen Free Pass – Can be used at Nikkō Station, Tōbu-Nikkō Station, Kirifuri Falls, Kirifuri Kōgen, and for the World Heritage Sightseeing Bus.
- Kirifuri Falls Free Pass (valid for only 1 day) – Can be used at Nikkō Station, Tōbu-Nikkō Station, Kirifuri Falls, and for the World Heritage Sightseeing Bus.
- World Heritage Tour Free Pass (valid for only 1 day) – Can be used at Nikkō Station, Tōbu-Nikkō Station, Nishi Sandō (tōshō-gū), and for the World Heritage Sightseeing Bus.
- Nikko Pass All Area (日光まるごと東武フリーパス) (valid for 4 days) – A round-trip ticket allows the purchaser to travel from any station of the Tōbu Railway Tōbu Skytree Line to the designated Free Ride Area. The Free Ride Area consists of train lines in the area between Shimo-Imaichi Station and Tōbu-Nikkō Station on the Tōbu Nikkō line, as well as Tōbu Bus Nikkō bus lines.

=== IC cards ===
Since 23 February 2010, passengers are able to use IC cards (PASMO, Suica) to ride the Tōbu Bus Nikkō.

== Parent company ==
=== Tōbu Bus ===
Tōbu Bus Co., Ltd.
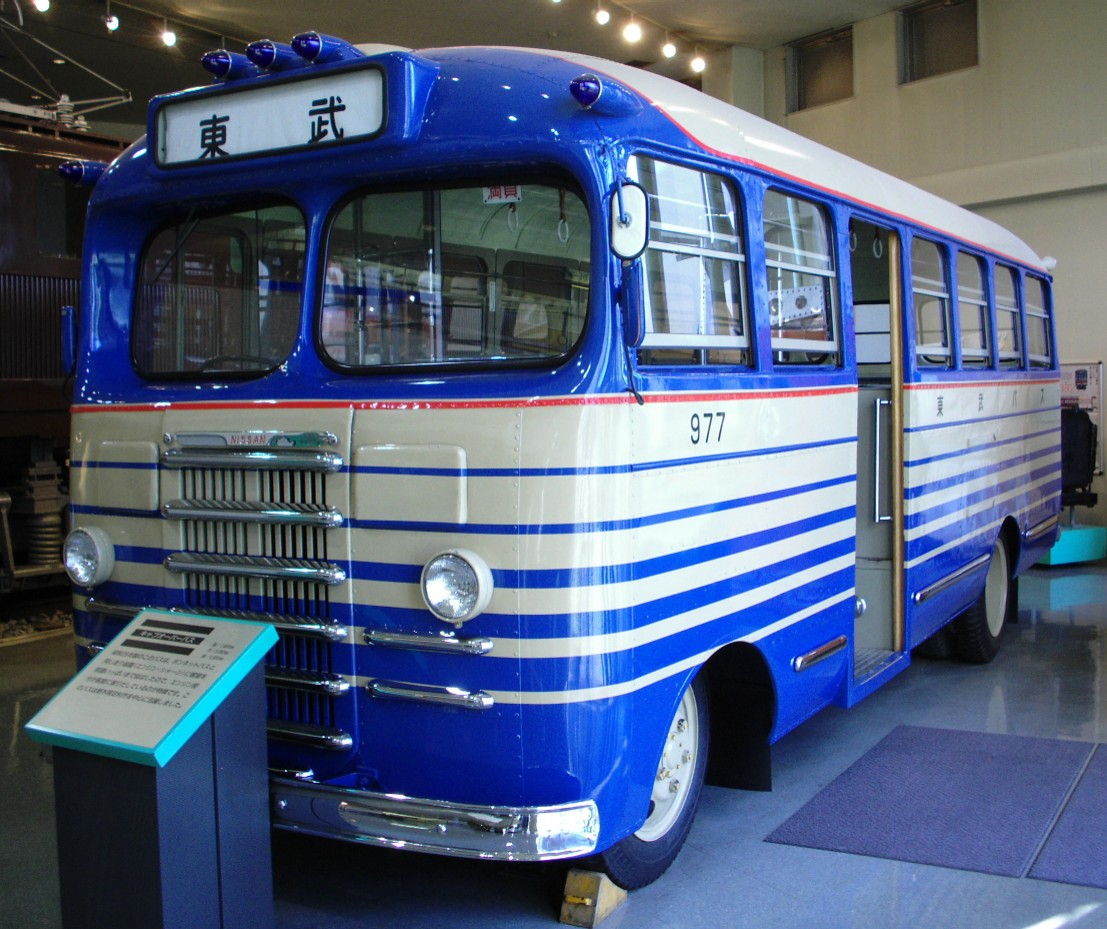
- Bus on display in the Tobu Museum
- Parent: Tōbu Railway
- Founded: 1933 (as Mōbu Motor Co.); 2002 (spun off from Tōbu Railway)
- Headquarters: 2-18-12 Oshiage Sumida, Tokyo, Japan (東京都墨田区押上二丁目18番12号)
- Service area: See following articles: Tobu Bus Central, Tobu Bus West, Tōbu Bus Nikkō
- Service type: Bus
- Chief executive: Noriyuki Kashikura
- Website: http://www.tobu-bus.com/

The Tōbu Bus Co., Ltd. (東武バス株式会社, Tōbu Basu Kabushiki-gaisha) is a bus company within the Tobu Group which was established on 30 January 2002 to inherit all the shares of the Tōbu Railway bus division.

==== Outline ====
The company was established on 30 January 2002 by spinning off from Tōbu Railway. The company began formal operations in its current form on 30 September 2002. In addition, the Tōbu Railway was split into 4 subgroups: Tōbu Bus East, Tōbu Bus Central, Tōbu Bus West, Tōbu Bus Nikko. Tōbu Bus is a holding company owning assets of these different subsidiaries, and as such does not operate any of the bus routes directly. However, the company does sell tickets for bus routes operated by these subsidiaries, as well as manage the lease of their properties.

==== History ====
The history of Tobu Bus begins with the establishment of Mōbu Motor, which was an affiliated company of Tōbu Railway in Gunma and Saitama in 1933. The bus department of Tōbu Railway was established in Kawagoe, Saitama, on 1 April 1934. In September 1936, these two companies were merged into Tōbu Motor and the new company inherited the service areas of Saitama, Gunma, Ibaraki, and Tochigi from Tōbu-affiliated companies.

After World War II, Tōbu Motor and Tōbu Nikkō Tramway were taken over by Tōbu Railway. The bus business ran a deficit in 1980 due to a decrease in passengers by 80%, and Tōbu Railway decided to split up as described above in September 2001 due to the difficulty of continuing operations. The offices and bus routes not transferred to Tōbu Bus at the time of this split were transferred to Asahi Motor Group around 1990.

- 20 January 2002 – Tōbu Bus transferred the assets and share of stock of the bus department of Tōbu Railway
- 1 October 2002 – Tōbu Bus and the three affiliated companies listed above started operations
- 1 October 2021 – Tōbu Bus East was merged into Tōbu Bus Central

==== Bus routes ====
- Tōbu Bus Nikkō
- Tōbu Bus West
- Tōbu Bus Central

== Other group companies ==
=== Tōbu Bus West ===
Tōbu Bus West Co., Ltd.
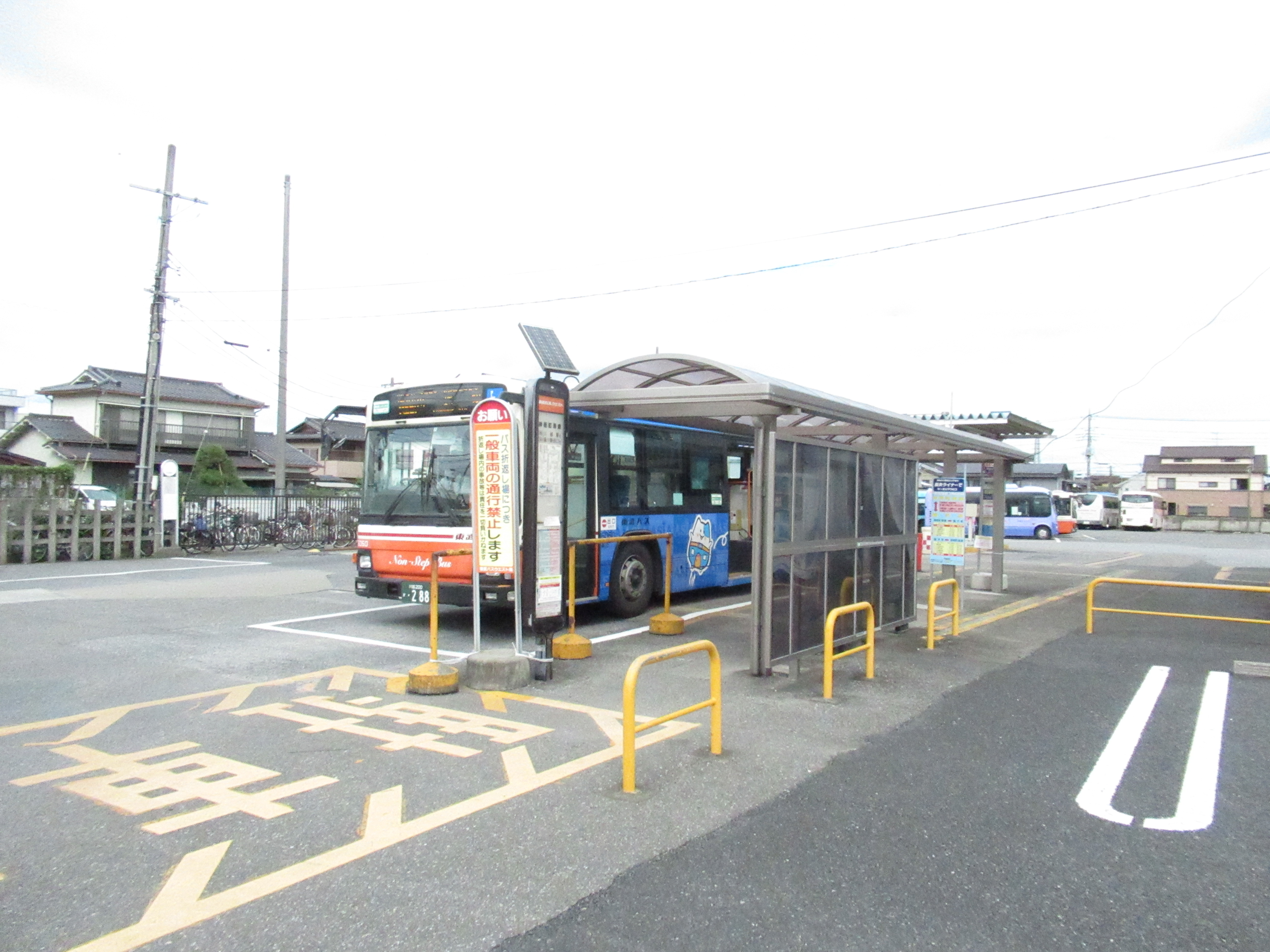
- Hino Blue Ribbon (frequently used on routes) and Kawagoe Business Office (Shinmeicho Garage)
- Parent: Tōbu Bus
- Founded: 4 April 2002
- Headquarters: 2-212 Yoshinomachi, Kita, Saitama, Saitama, Japan (埼玉県さいたま市北区吉野町2-212)
- Service area: Saitama
- Service type: Bus
- Routes: Route map (Omiya Office); Route map (Iwatsuki/Amanuma Office); Route map (Ageo Office); Route map (Kawagoe/Sakado Office); Route map (Niiza Office)
- Fleet: 320 buses
- Chief executive: 金井 応季
- Website: Tobu Bus West (in Japanese)

The Tobu Bus West Co., Ltd. (東武バスウエスト株式会社, Tōbu Basu Uesuto Kabushiki-gaisha) is a subsidiary company of Tobu Bus. The head office is located in Ōmiya-ku, Saitama.

==== Outline ====
In 2002, the company was spun off from Tōbu Railway. The bus company runs in the area around the train stations serviced by the Tōbu Urban Park Line, the Takasaki Line, and the Tōbu Tōjō Line in Saitama. The company primarily serves tourists (Kawagoe) as well as commuters.

==== Offices ====
- Ōmiya Business Office (OM)
  - Iwatsuki Office
  - Amanuma Office
  - Ageo Office (AO)
- Kawagoe Business Office (KG)
  - Sakado Office
- Niiza Business Office (NZ)

==== Highway buses ====
Name	Terminus	Via	Terminus	Office	Note
ON Liner	Seibu Bus Omiya Office	Ōmiya Station (Saitama)・Saitama-Shintoshin Station・Narita Tobu Hotel Airport	Narita Airport	Omiya	Operated with Seibu Bus, Kokusai Kogyo, Chiba Kotsu, Keisei Bus
Haneda Airport Line	Okegawa Station	Ageo Station	Haneda Airport	Omiya	Operated with Keihin Kyuko Bus
Narita Airport Line	Sakado Station	Kawagoe Station	Narita Airport	Kawagoe	Operated with Chiba Kotsu, KAWAGOE Motor Corporation
Tokyo Disney Resort - Kawagoe Line	Shinmeicho Shako	Hon-Kawagoe Station・Kawagoe Station	Tokyo Disney Resort	Kawagoe	Operated with Keisei Transit Bus
Keno Liner Kawagoe - Shonan Line	Shinmeicho Shako	Hon-Kawagoe Station・Kawagoe Station・Hon-Atsugi Station・Tsujidō Station	Fujisawa Station	Kawagoe	Operated with Kanagawa Chuo Kotsu
Narita Airport Line	Fujimino Station	Niiza Shako・Shiki Station・Asakadai Station	Narita Airport	Niiza	Operated with Airport Transport Service
Haneda Airport Line	Fujimino Station	Niiza Shako・Shiki Station・Asakadai Station	Haneda Airport	Niiza	Operated with Keihin Kyuko Bus
Skytree Shuttle	Niiza Shako	Shiki Station・Asakadai Station・Wakōshi Station	Tokyo Skytree	Niiza	
Skytree Shuttle	Ōedo Onsen Monogatari	Grand Nikko Tokyo・Tokyo Teleport Station・Kinshichō Station	Tokyo Skytree	Niiza	Tobu Bus Central
Midnight Arrow Kawagoe	Ikebukuro Station	Wakōshi Station・Shiki Station (Saitama)・Kawagoe Station	Hon-Kawagoe Station	Niiza	

==== Ticket ====
About tickets for Koedo Kawagoe

=== Tobu Bus Central ===
Tōbu Bus Central Co., Ltd.
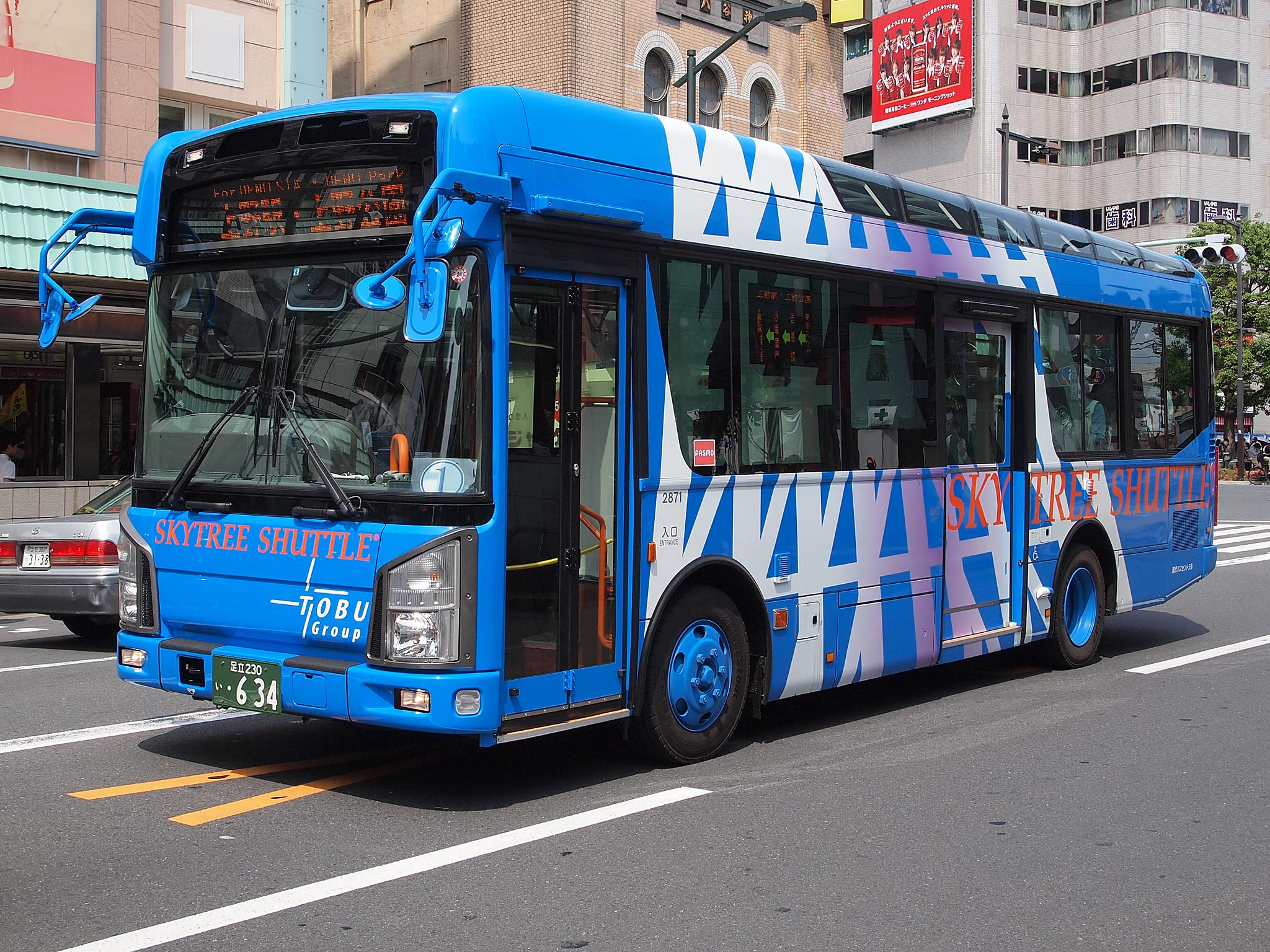
- Isuzu Erga Mio are used as shuttles for the Skytree
- Parent: Tōbu Bus
- Founded: 4 April 2002
- Headquarters: 2-9-2 Iko-Motomachi, Adachi, Tokyo, Japan (東京都足立区伊興本町2-9-2)
- Service area: Saitama, Tokyo
- Service type: Bus
- Routes: Route map (Katsushika Office); Route map (Adachi Office); Route map (Soka Office); Route map (Yashio Office); Route map (Misato Office)
- Fleet: 460 buses
- Chief executive: 槇田 浩昭
- Website: Tobu Bus Central (in Japanese)

Tōbu Bus Central Co., Ltd. (東武バスセントラル株式会社, Tobu Bus Sentoraru Kabushiki gaisya) is a subsidiary company of Tōbu Bus. The head office is located in Adachi.

==== Outline ====
In 2002, the company was spun off from the Tōbu Railway bus department. The bus company operates in the area around the train stations serving the Tōbu Skytree Line. On 1 October 2021, Tōbu Bus East was merged into Tōbu Bus Central. Following this, the company began operating in the area servicing the stations of the Tōbu Urban Park Line, the Tsukuba Express, and the Jōban Line in Chiba.

==== Office ====
- Adachi Business Office (AD)
  - Nishi-Arai Office
  - Katsushika Office
  - Hanahata Office
- Soka Business Office (SK)
  - Yashio Office
  - Misato Office
  - Yoshikawa Office
- Nishi-Kashiwa Business Office (KW)
  - Shōnan Office

==== Highway buses ====
Name	Terminus	Via	Terminus	Note
Iwaki	Tokyo Station	Ayase Station	Iwaki Station (Fukushima)	Operated with JR Bus Kanto, Shin-joban Kotsu
Adatara	Shin-Koshigaya Station	Urawa-misono Station	Kōriyama Station (Fukushima)	Operated with Fukushima Transportation
Haneda Airport Line	Kita-Senju Station	Senjuōhashi Station	Haneda Airport	Operated with Keihin Kyuko Bus
Shirakobato	Shin-Koshigaya Station	Sōka Station・Yashio Station	Narita Airport	Operated with Chiba Kotsu, Narita Airport Transport
Skytree Shuttle Haneda Airport Line	Tokyo Skytree	Kinshichō Station	Haneda Airport	Operated with Keihin Kyuko Bus
Skytree Shuttle Tokyo Disney Resort Line	Tokyo Skytree	Kinshichō Station・Kasai Station	Maihama Station#Bus routes	Operated with Keisei Bus
Skytree Shuttle Odaiba Line	Tokyo Skytree	Kinshichō Station・Hotel East Tokyo 21・Tokyo Teleport Station	Oedo Onsen Monogatari	Operated with Tobu Bus West
Kashiwa - Haneda Airport Line	Haneda Airport	Kashiwanoha-campus Station	Kashiwa Station	Vehicles and drivers belonging to Nishi-kashiwa and operated with Keihin Kyuko Bus
Midnight Arrow Kashiwa and Abiko	Yurakucho Station	Ueno Station・Misato Station (Saitama)・Nagareyama Station・Nagareyama-ōtakanomori Station・Toyoshiki Station・Kashiwa Station・Kashiwanoha-campus Station・Kita-Kashiwa Station	Abiko Station (Chiba)	Operated on weekday nights
Midnight Arrow Kasukabe	Tokyo Station	Ueno Station・Sōka Station・Shinden Station (Saitama)・Gamō Station・Shin-Koshigaya Station	Kasukabe Station	Operated on weekday nights
Midnight Arrow Yoshikawa, Misato and Minami-Nagareyama	Shin-Koshigaya Station	Koshigaya-Laketown Station・Yoshikawa Station (Saitama)・Misato Station (Saitama)	Minami-Nagareyama Station	Operated on weekday nights

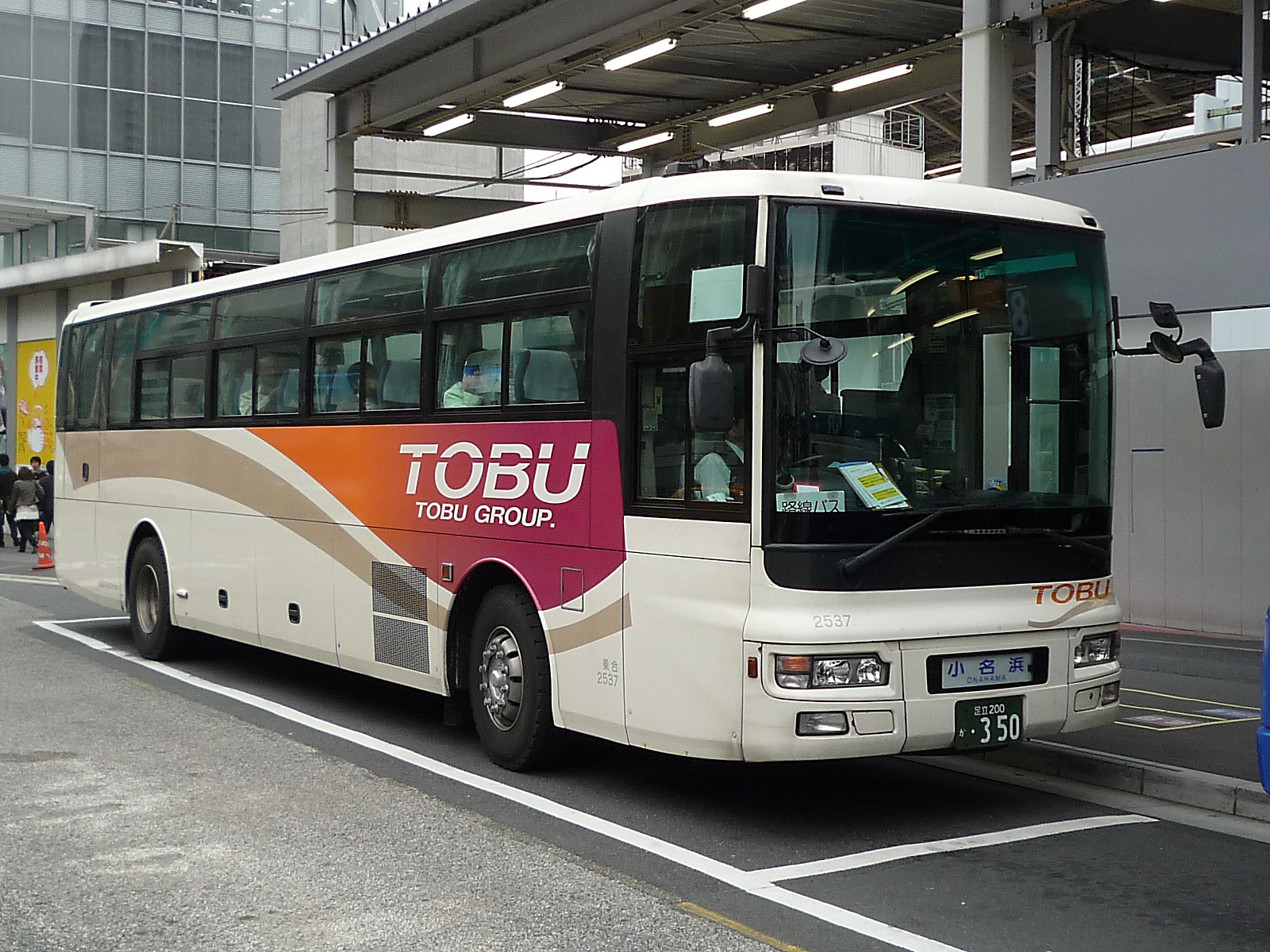
Adatara bound for Koriyama via Tōhoku Expressway

==== Tickets ====
About tickets for Ueno/Adachi

== See also ==
- Tobu Railway
  - Tobu Bus
  - Asahi Motor Corporation
    - Akechidaira Ropeway

Companies previously belonging to the Tōbu Group:

- Aizu Bus
- Toya Kōtsū
