= Asahi Motor =

Bus companies in Japan

ASAHI Motor Corporation
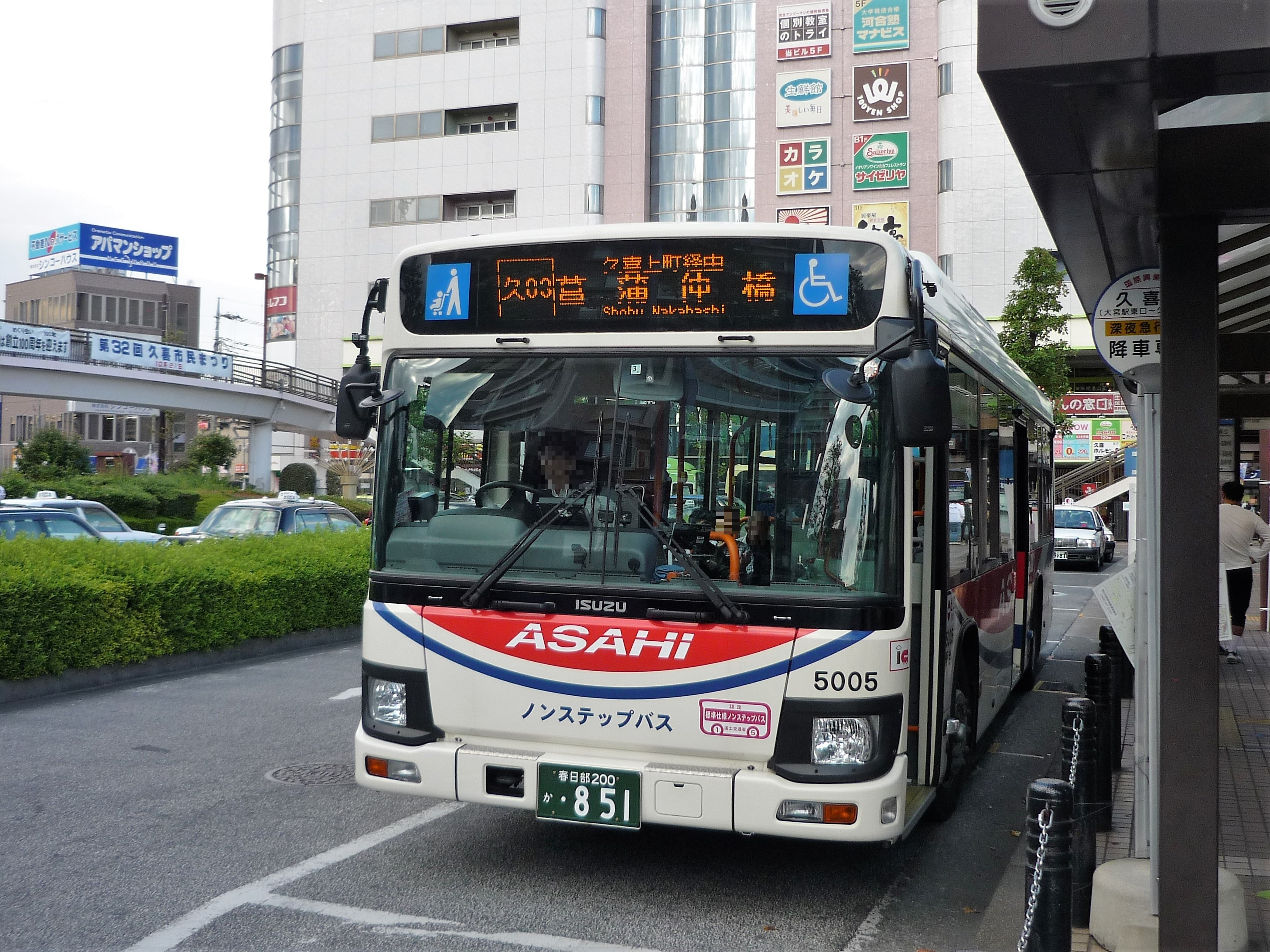
- Isuzu Erga at Kuki Station
- Parent: Tobu Railway
- Founded: 11 January 1941
- Headquarters: 1201, Yahara Shinden, Kasukabe, Saitama (埼玉県春日部市谷原新田1201)
- Service area: Saitama, Ibaraki, Gunma, Tochigi, Chiba Prefecture, Tokyo List on the pages of TOHOKU KYUKO BUS, Kan-etsu Kotsu, Nikko-koutsu, Kokusai Juo Bus, KAWAGOE Motor, Bando BUS, IBAKYU Motor
- Service type: Land Transportation (Buses and Taxies)
- Fleet: 100
- Chief executive: Noriyuki Kashikura
- Website: http://www.asahibus.jp/

The ASAHI Motor Corporation (朝日自動車株式会社, Asahi Jidosha Kabushiki-gaisha) is a bus company within the Tobu Group which was established on 11 January 1941 in Tsuchiura.

== Overview ==
ASAHI Motor was established on 11 January 1941 in Tsuchiura as a company for taxis and buses. The taxi business of Tobu Railway on stations which belonged to Tobu Railway transferred to this company in 1954. The company has established its inroads bus business since 1993 as 21-Jō basu (21条バス) which charters buses that are used on route buses by requesting from a local government.

The company received ownership of offices and vehicles of the Tobu Railway bus department in 1994. Between 1999 and 2002, the bus company transferred a selection of offices and other vehicles from Tobu Bus. The transfer of assets ended in 2002 when Tobu Bus spilt from Tobu Railway. ASAHI Motor discontinued its chartered bus business in 2008, at which point the business was split into subsidiary companies.

The company owns shares of Bando Bus and other companies. Its parent company, Asahi Motor Corporation Group, owns TOHOKU KYUKO BUS, Kan-etsu Kotsu, Nikko-koutsu, Kokusai Juo Bus, KAWAGOE Motor, Bando BUS, and IBAKYU Motor.

== Offices and routes ==
- Management and overall of affiliated and group companies head office

It is located near the head office of Tobu Railway in Oshiage Station.

- Head office

It is located near Kasukabe Station on Tobu Skytree Line

- Koshigaya Office (Route buses and Chartered buses)
- Kasukabe Office (Route buses)
- Kazo Office (Route buses and Chartered buses, Taxies)
- Kuki Office (Route buses and Chartered buses)
- Honjo Office (Route buses and Chartered buses, Taxies)
- Sakai Office (Route buses and Taxies)
- Ota Office (Route buses and Taxies)
- Shobu Office (Route buses and Chartered buses)
- Sugito Office (Chartered buses and Taxies)

=== Kiryu Asahi Motor Corporation ===
- Kiryu Office (The head office of Kiryu Asahi Motor Corporation)
- Omama Office

== Community buses ==
Entrust this company from each local government.
Tokyo

- Adachi City Community Bus Harukaze

Saitama

- Kasukabe City Community Bus Haru Bus
- Kazo City Community Bus Kazo Kizuna
- Gyoda City Community Bus Gyoda City Circular-route Bus
- Kounosu City Community Bus Flower
- Hanyu City Community Ai・Ai Bus
- Soka City Community Bus PariPorikun Bus
- Sugito City Community Bus Aiai
- Ageo City Community Bus Guruttokun

Chiba

- Noda City Community Bus Mame Bus

Ibaraki

- Goka City Community Bus Gokarin

== Other bus routes ==
- TOHOKU KYUKO BUS
- Kan-etsu Kotsu
- Nikko-koutsu
- Kokusai Juo Bus
- KAWAGOE Motor
- Bando BUS
- IBAKYU Motor

=== Other bus companies of TOBU GROUP ===
- Tobu Bus Nikko
- Tobu Bus West
- Tobu Bus Central

== Tohoku Kyuko Bus ==
TOHOKU KYUKO BUS CO., LTD.
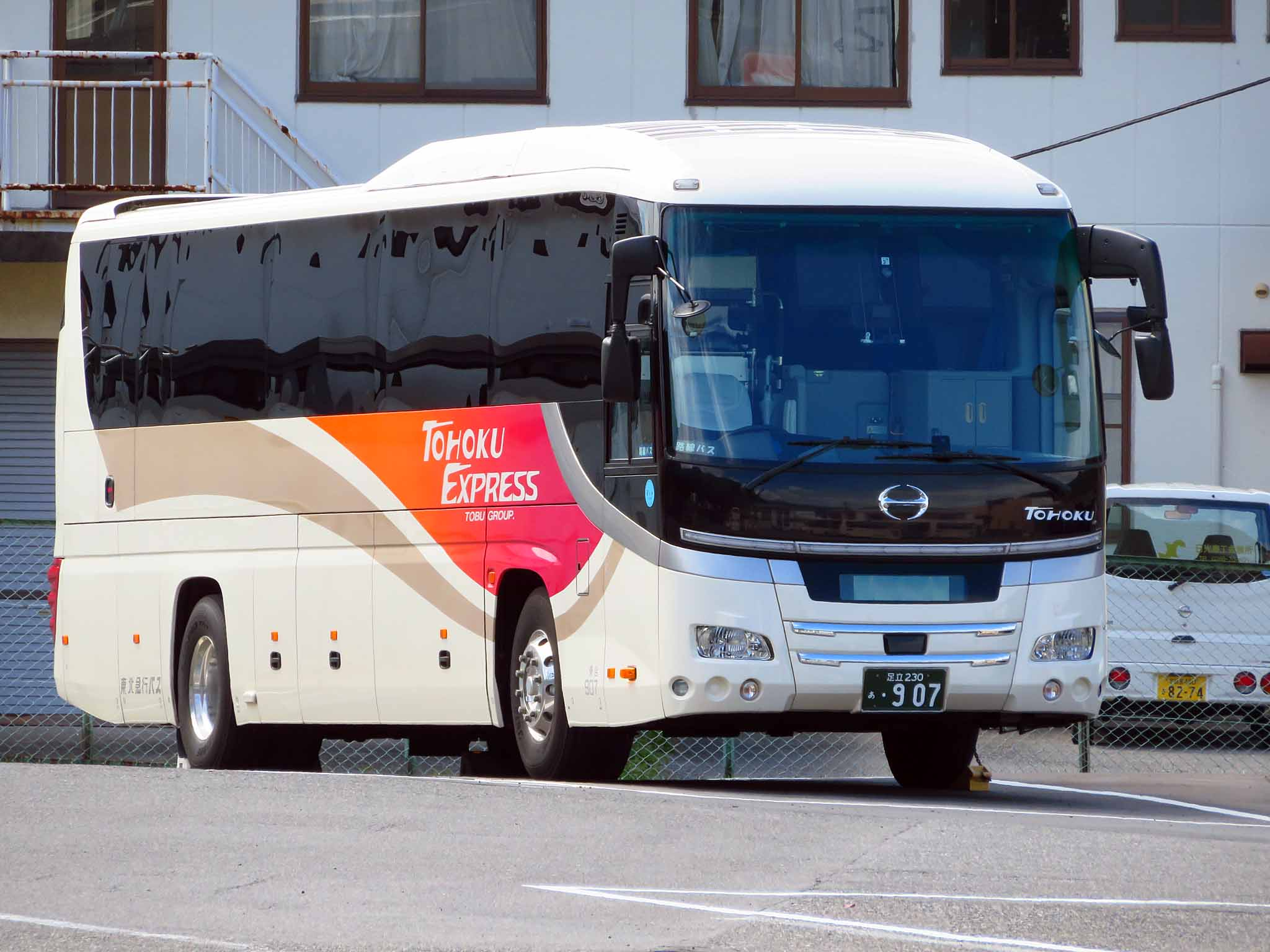
- Hino Selega (They are used for a lot of expressway buses) at Kinugawaonsen Station
- Parent: Tobu Railway
- Founded: 4 April 2002
- Headquarters: 2-6-6, Shinonome, Koto, Tokyo (東京都江東区東雲二丁目6番6号)
- Service type: Bus
- Routes: Route map
- Fleet: 20
- Chief executive: Hirochika Ohdate
- Website: TOHOKU KYUKO BUS (in English)

The TOHOKU KYUKO BUS CO., LTD. (東北急行バス株式会社, Tohoku Kyuko Bus Kabushiki gaisya) is a subsidiary company of Tobu Railway and belongs to Asahi Motor Corporation Group. The head office is located in Tokyo Office.

=== Overview ===
In 1962, the company was established by capital injection of Tobu Railway and Toya Kotsu, Miyagi Transportation and Fukushima Transportation, Aizu Bus, Yamagata Kotsu. In 2002, Tohoku Kyuko Bus started to be an affiliated company of Tobu Railway because Tobu Railway received other shares.

=== History ===
- In 1962
  - 12 June: Establishment by capital injection of Tobu Railway and Toya Kotsu, Miyagi Transportation and Fukushima Transportation, Aizu Bus, Yamagata Kotsu
  - 1 August: The company started to operate the bus routes
- In 1964

Started to manage chartered buses at the Tokyo Office

- In 2002

This company has belonged to Tobu Railway

=== Office ===
- Tokyo Office (Shinonome Garage)

It is located head office of this company. Opened in 1962.

- Sendai Office

It is located near Sendai Station at 1-1-7, Motomachi, Aoba, Sendai, Miyagi

  - Sendai Garage

It is located at 2, Azuma, Aoba, Sendai, Miyagi

=== Highway buses ===
NO	Terminus	Via	Terminus	Note
New Star/Holiday Star	Tokyo Station	Non stop	Sendai Station	
Rainbow	Tokyo Station	Fukushima Station, Yonezawa Station	Yamagata Station	
TOKYO SUNRISE	Tokyo Station	Murayama Station	Shinjō Station	Operated with Yamagata Kotsu
Flying Liner/Flying Sneaker	Tokyo Disney Resort	Tokyo Station - Kyōto Station - Ōsaka Station	Ōsaka Abenobashi Station	Operated with Kintetsu Bus
Mamakari Liner	Tokyo Disney Resort	Tokyo Station - Okayama Station	Kurashiki Station	Operated with Ryobi Bus. When passengers reserve the seats, only telephone reservation for Tohoku Kyuko Bus.
LeBlanc	Shinonome Shako	Tokyo Station・Yokohama Station・Tsuyama Station	Okayama Station	Operated with Ryobi Bus
Kimasshi	Shinonome Shako	Ueno Station・Toyama Station	Kanazawa Station	Operated with Kitanippon Kanko Bus
Tokyo - Kinugawaonsen Nikko Line	Tokyo Station	Shimo-Imaichi Station・Tōbu-Nikkō Station・Tobu World Square	Kinugawa-Onsen Station	

== Kan-etsu Kotsu ==
Kan-etsu Kotsu CO., LTD.
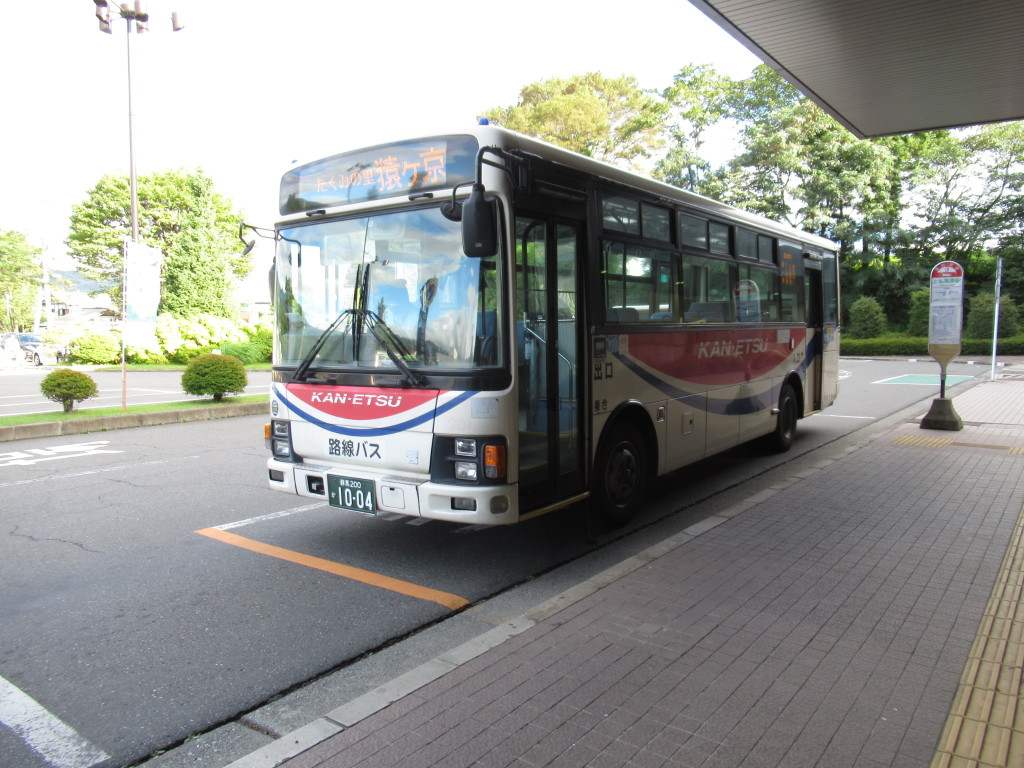
- Isuzu Erga Mio at Jomo-Kogen Station
- Parent: Tobu Railway
- Founded: 15 June 1953 (as Minakami Kanko Car)
- Headquarters: 608-1 Nakamura, Shibukawa, Gunma, Japan (群馬県渋川市中村608-1)
- Service area: Gunma, Tochigi
- Service type: Bus
- Fleet: 210
- Chief executive: Shunya Sato
- Website: Kan-etsu Kotsu(in Japanese)

The Kan-etsu Kotsu CO., LTD. (関越交通株式会社, Kan-etsu Kotsu Kabushiki gaisya) is a subsidiary company of Tobu Railway and belongs to Asahi Motor Corporation Group. The head office is located in Shibukawa.

=== Overview ===
The company was established on 15 June 1953 as Minakami Kanko Car Corporation (水上観光自動車) and has belonged to Tobu Railway since March 1960. It was renamed to its current name on 1 November 1972. It has been operating bus routes since 1982.

Agatsuma Kanko Motor, established on 5 November 1953, and had belonged to Tobu Group from 1969 until October 2002 when it was merged into Kan-etsu Kotsu.

Gunma Kanko Taxi established in 1950, belonged to Tobu Bus Group from 1957 until 2000 when it was merged.

The bus company runs in the area based in the stations which belong to Jōetsu Line and Jōetsu Shinkansen.

=== Office ===
- Head office
- Shibukawa Office
- Agatsuma Office
- Maebashi Office
- Numata Office
- Kamata Office
  - Oze-Tokura Information desk
  - Tsukiyono Auto Gas Stand

=== Highway buses ===
NO	Terminus	Via	Terminus	Note
Azalea	Ikaho Onsen	Maebashi Station, Takasaki Station	Narita Airport	Operated with Chiba Kotsu
Shima Onsen	Shinonome Shako	Tokyo Station, Shibukawa Station, Nakanojō Station	Shimaonsen	
OZE SHINJUKU	Shinjuku Station	Kawagoe Station	Oshimizu	
APPLE	Numata Station	Gunma Prefectural Hall	Gundai Hospital	
Fujikyu Highland Line	Shibukawa Office	Shibukawa Station - Maebashi Station - Takasaki Station - Fuji-Q Highland	Kawaguchiko Station	Operated with Fujikyu Bus
Joshu Yukemuri Liner Minakami Onsen	Shinjuku Station	Kawagoe Station, Jōmō-Kōgen Station	Minakami Station	
Joshu Yukemuri Ikaho/Shimaonsen	Shin-Koshigaya Station	Kawagoe Station・Shibukawa Station・Ikaho Onsen	Shima Onsen	
Katashina Snow Express	Shinjuku Station	Non stop	Michi no eki Katashina	

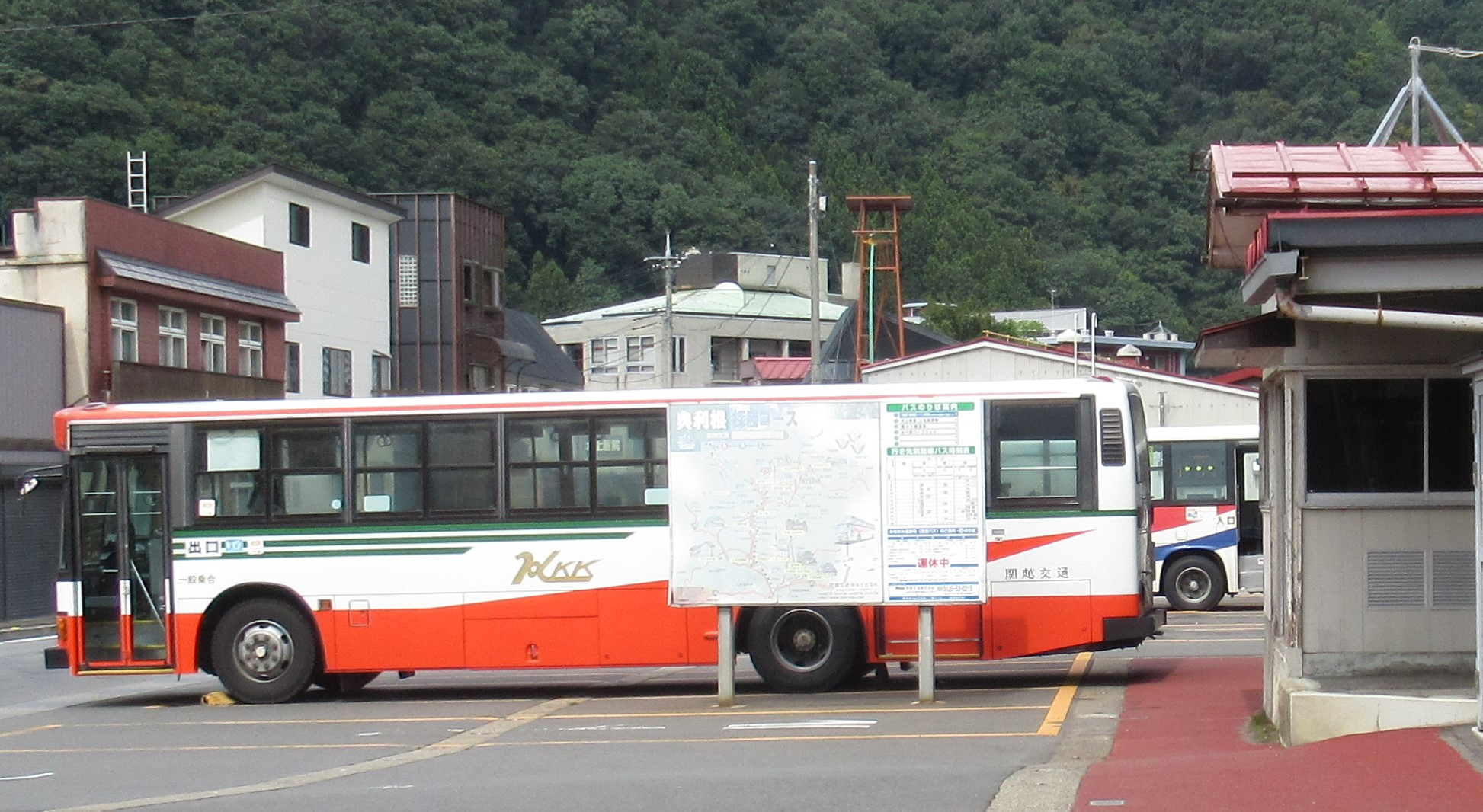
Bus stop at Minakami Station

=== Ticket ===
About one diary tickets for sightseeing in Gunma

== Nikko Kotsu ==
Nikko-koutsu CO., LTD.
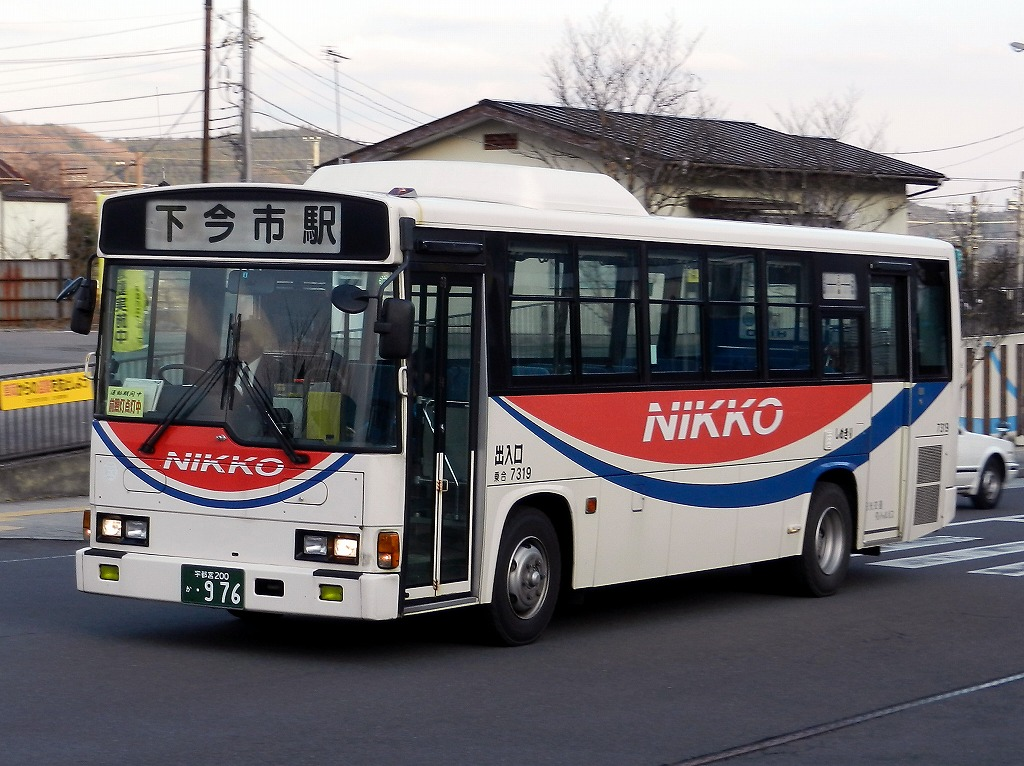
- A bus bound for Shimo-Imaichi Station
- Parent: Tobu Railway
- Founded: 25 May 1955
- Headquarters: 8-1 Aioi, Nikko, Tochigi, Japan (栃木県日光市相生町8-1)
- Service area: Tochigi
- Service type: Bus and Ropeway
- Routes: Route map
- Chief executive: Takeshi Watanabe
- Website: Nikko Kotsu(in Japanese)

The Nikko-koutsu CO., LTD. (日光交通株式会社, Nikko Koutsu Kabushiki gaisya) is a subsidiary company of Tobu Railway. The head office is located in Nikko Office.

=== Overview ===
The company established on 25 May 1955, was transferred Akechidaira Ropeway from Tobu Railway on 1 April 1985. Tobu Dial Bus was merged to this company in 2008. The bus company runs in the vicinity of the Watarase Keikoku Line and the Tobu Kinugawa Line.

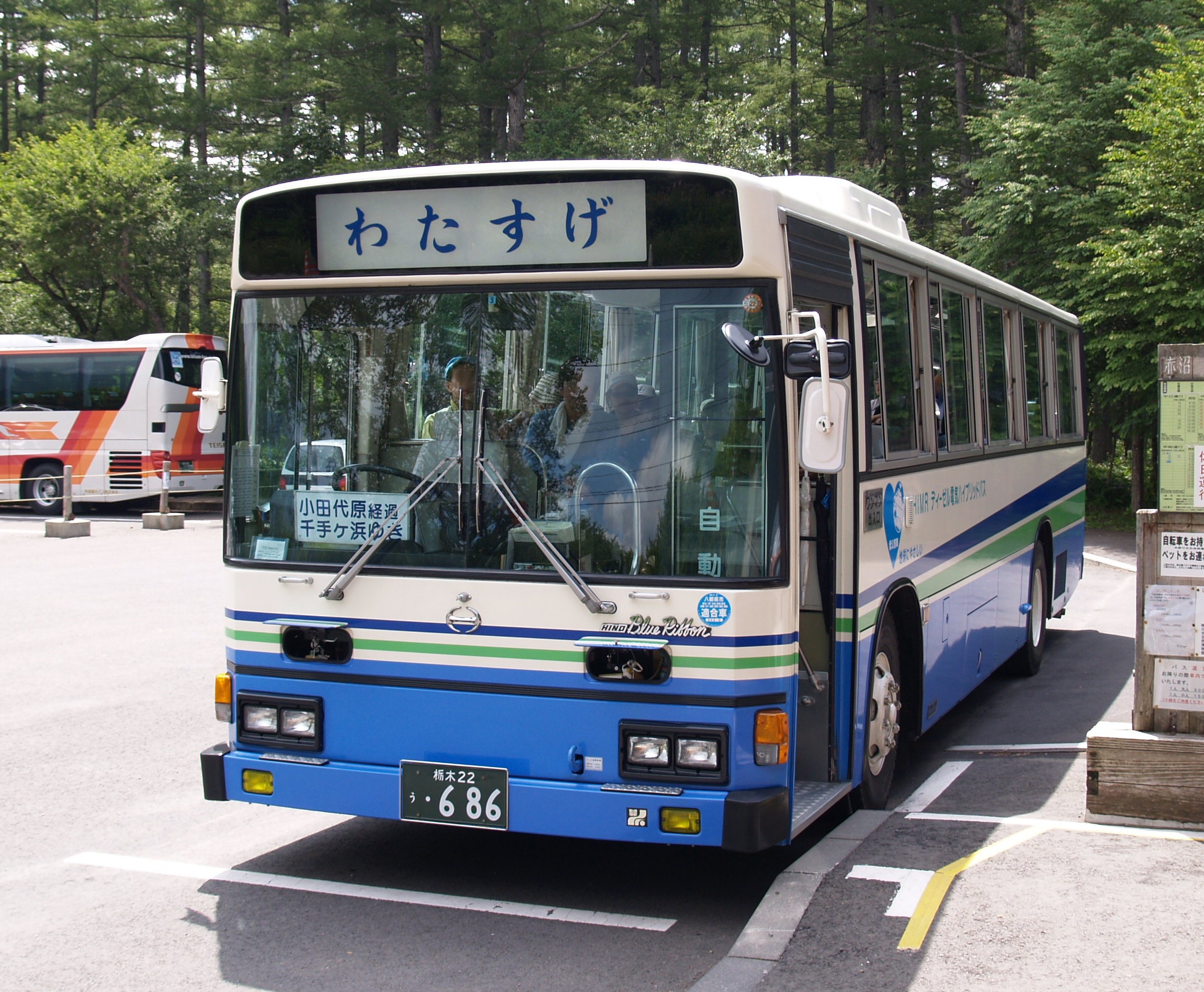
Low emission bus which is using Hino Blue Ribbon is operated as Watasugearound for Odashirogahara

.

=== Office ===
- Nikko Office
- Dial Office

=== Express buses ===
NO	Terminus	Via	Terminus	Note
Nikko Nasu Mankitsu Liner	Tōbu-Nikkō Station	Kinugawa-Onsen Station, Yunishigawa-Onsen Station	Nasu Yumoto Onsen	Operated with Toya Kotsu
Nikko Kinugawa Express	Kinugawa-Onsen Station	Tōbu-Nikkō Station	Nikkō Tōshō-gū	

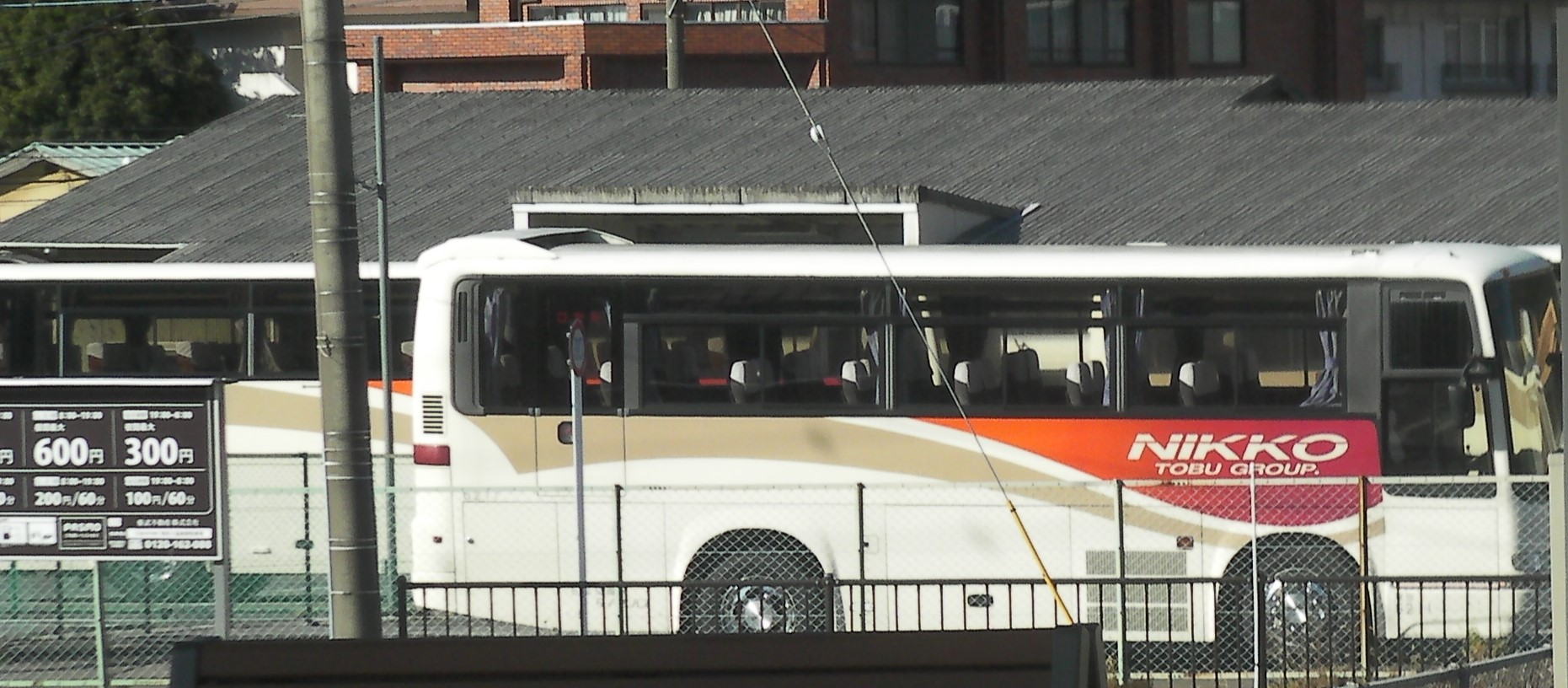
Bus terminal at Kinugawaonsen Station

=== Subsidiary company ===
Akechidaira Ropeway

=== Tickets ===
About tickets for Nikko

== Kokusai Juo Bus ==
Kokusai Juo CO., LTD.
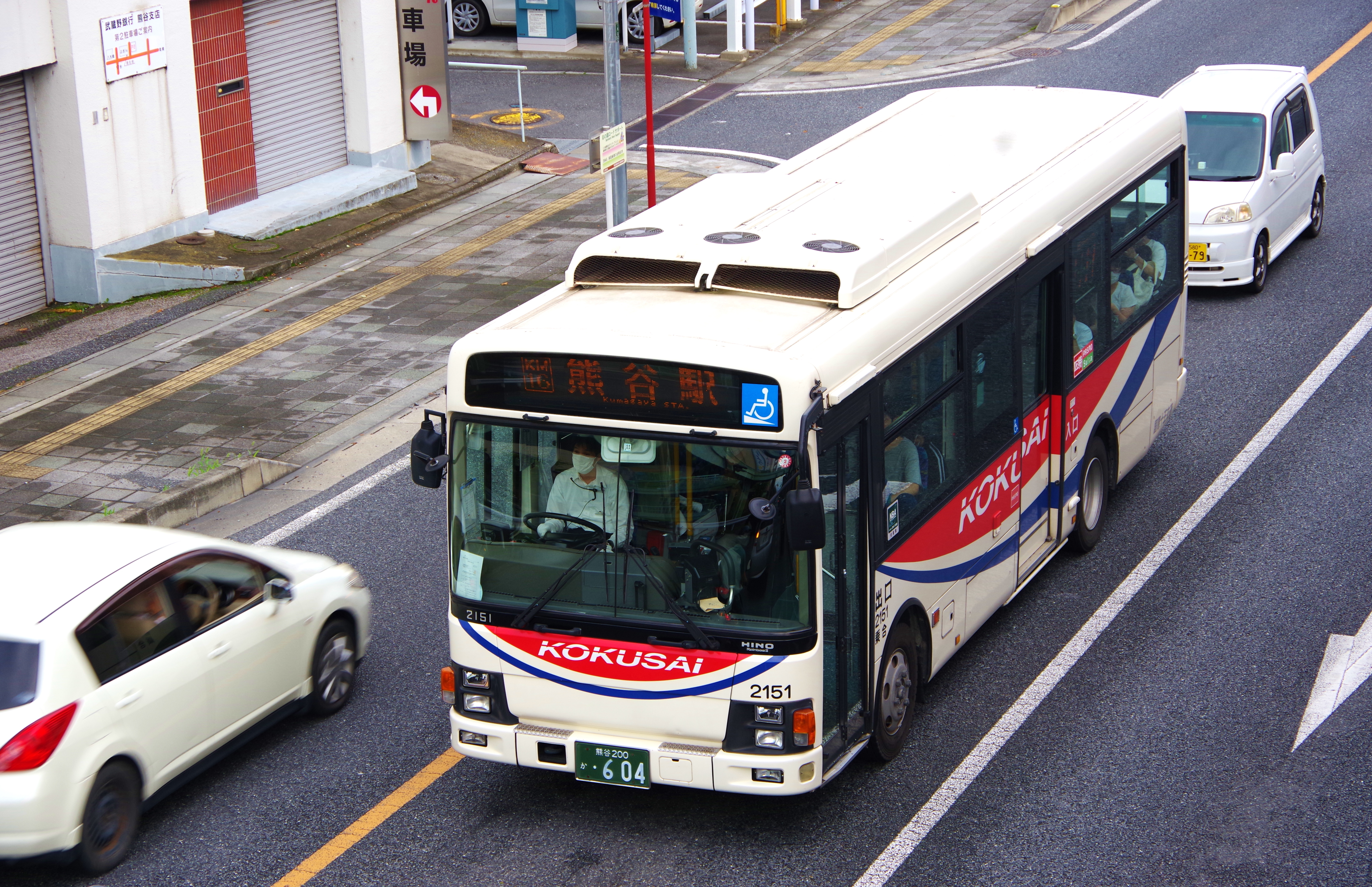
- Isuzu Erga Mio
- Parent: Tobu Railway, ASAHI Motor, Bando Bus
- Founded: 26 December 1957 (As Kokusai Hire)
- Headquarters: 263-1 Niijima, Kumagaya, Saitama, Japan (埼玉県熊谷市新島263-1)
- Service area: Saitama
- Service type: Bus
- Routes: Route map
- Chief executive: Yasuhito Fukuda
- Website: Kokusai Juo Bus(in Japanese)

Kokusai Juo CO., LTD. (国際十王交通株式会社, Kokusai Juo Koutsu Kabushiki gaisya) is a subsidiary company of ASAHI Motor and Bando Bus and Tobu Railway. The head office is located in Nikko Office.

=== Overview ===
The company was established on 26 December 1957 as Kokusai Hire which was a subsidiary company of Kokusai Kogyo. Kokusai Hire was merged into Ryomo Kanko Motor in 2002, which subsequently merged Juo Motor on 1 January 2004. The new company was renamed to Kokusai Juo.

Its operations are in the vicinity of the Tobu Isesaki Line and the Takasaki Line.

=== Office ===
- Kumagaya Office

=== Bus routes ===
==== Route buses ====
Most bus routes are connected Higashi-Matsuyama Station and Shinrinkōen Station (Saitama) with Kumagaya Station as the result of the discontinuation of the Tobu Kumagaya Line.

==== Expressway buses ====
NO	Terminus	Via	Terminus	Note
Haneda Airport Line	Kagohara Station	Kumagaya Station, Shinrinkōen Station, Sakado Station (Saitama)	Haneda Airport	Operated with Airport Transport Service

== KAWAGOE Motor ==
KAWAGOE Motor Corporation
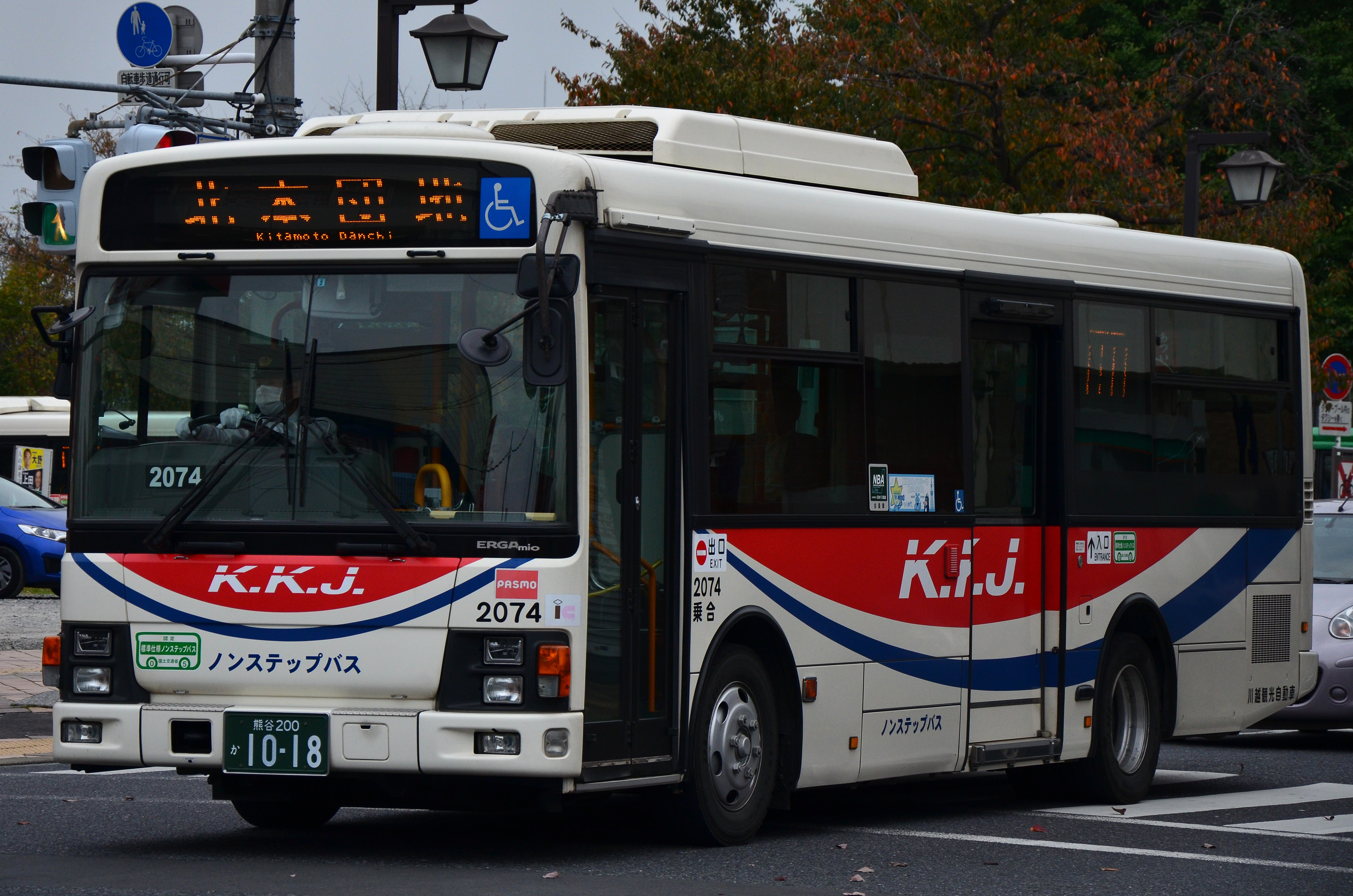
- Isuzu Erga Mio
- Parent: Tobu Railway
- Founded: 4 August 1966 (Establishment in 1933 as Kawagoe Motor LLC)
- Headquarters: 3897-3 Namegawa, Hiki, Saitama, Japan (埼玉県比企郡滑川町3897-3)
- Service area: Saitama
- Service type: Bus
- Routes: Route map
- Fleet: 86
- Chief executive: Ouki Kanai
- Website: Kawagoe Motor(in Japanese)

The KAWAGOE Motor CO., LTD. (川越観光自動車株式会社, Kawagoe Kanko Jidosha Kabushiki gaisya) is a subsidiary company of Tobu Railway. The head office is located in Shinrinkoen Office.

=== Outline ===
The company was established on 3 August 1933 as Kawagoe Motor LLC, and has belonged to Tobu Group since 1962. Meanwhile, KAWAGOE Motor Corporation was established on 4 August 1966. Kawagoe Motor LLC merged into KAWAGOE Motor Corporation on 1 November 1966.

Operations on bus routes started on 1 April 1998. Buses serve in the vicinity of the Tōbu Tōjō Line, Tobu Ogose Line, and the Takasaki Line.

=== Office ===
- Shinrinkoen Office

=== Expressway buses ===
NO	Terminus	Via	Terminus	Note
Narita Airport Line	Shinrinkōen Station	Kawagoe Station, Sakado Station (Saitama)	Narita Airport	

== Bando Bus ==
BANDO BUS inc.
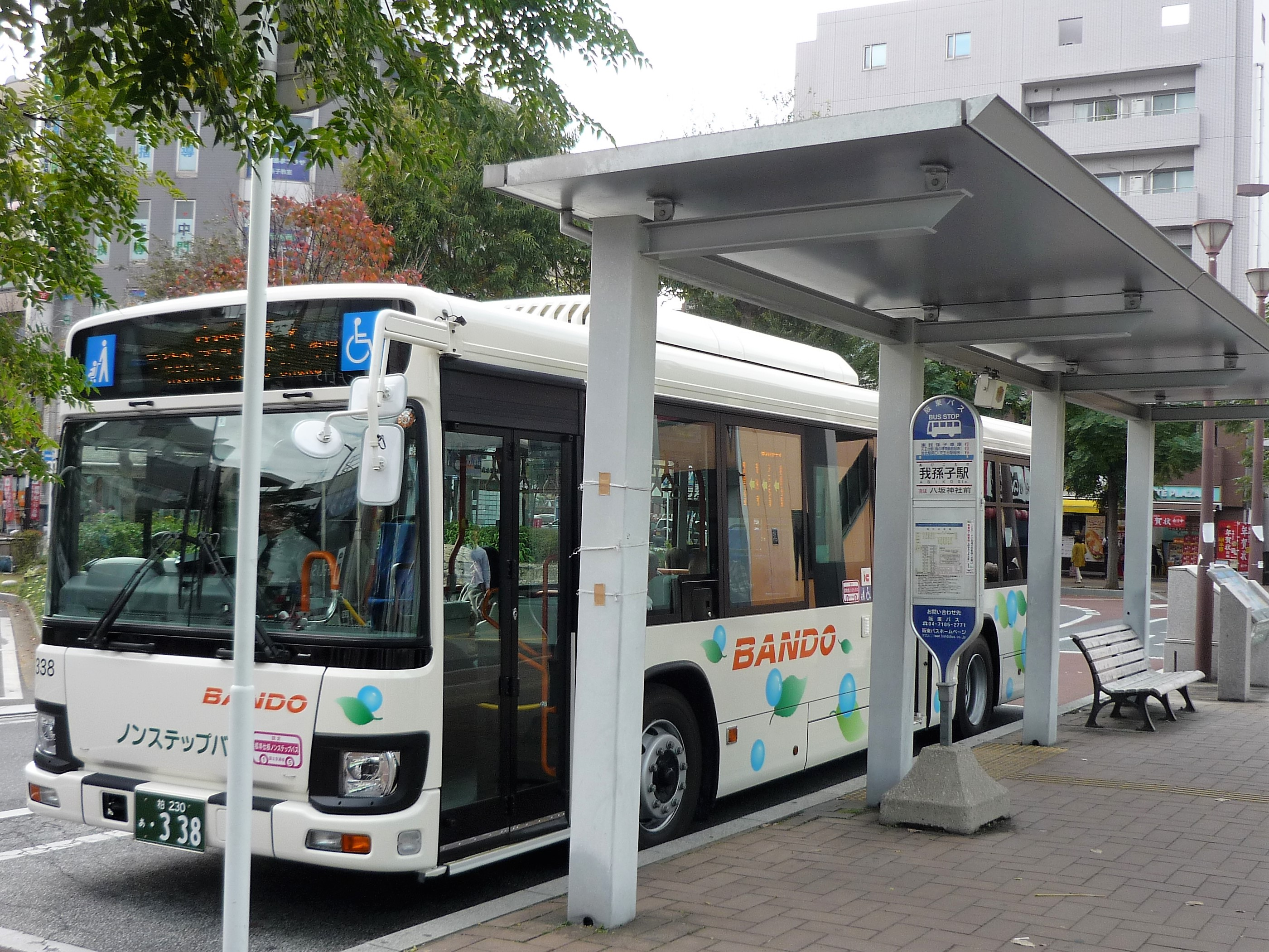
- Stops at Abiko Station (Chiba)
- Parent: ASAHI Motor
- Founded: 15 November 1949
- Headquarters: 2-36-22 Higashi-Abiko, Abiko, Chiba, Japan (千葉県我孫子市東我孫子2-36-22)
- Service area: Chiba
- Service type: Bus
- Routes: Route map
- Chief executive: Sou Tazaki
- Website: Bando Bus(in Japanese)

BANDO BUS CO., LTD. (阪東自動車株式会社, Bando Jidosha Kabushiki gaisya) is a subsidiary company of ASAHI Motor. The head office is located in Abiko Office.

=== Overview ===
The company was established in November 1949 by local people because routes buses ran in Imba area had belonged to Tobu Railway since February 1958 until 2003.

The company has belonged to ASAHI Motor since 2003. It runs in the vicinity of the Jōban Line.

=== Office ===
- Abiko Office
  - Higahsi-Abiko Garage
  - Shibazaki Garage

=== Community buses ===
- ABI BUS

== IBAKYU Motor ==
IBAKYU Motor Corporation
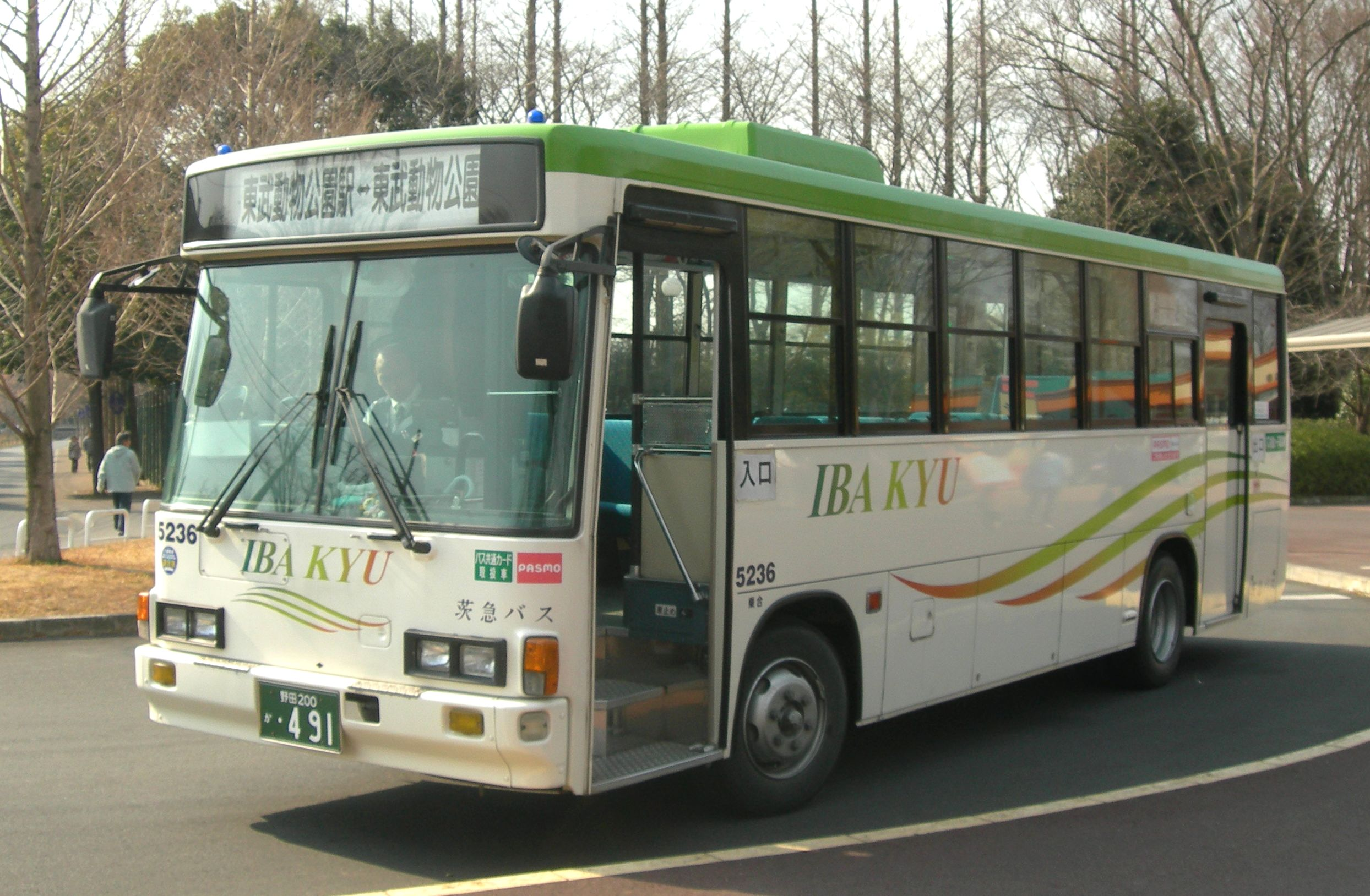
- At Tobu Zoo
- Parent: Tobu Railway
- Founded: 16 June 1950 (As Uchiyama Un'yu)
- Headquarters: 28-1 Chikuhichi, Matsubushi, Kita-Katsushika, Saitama, Japan (埼玉県北葛飾郡松伏町大字築比地28-1)
- Service area: Saitama
- Service type: Bus
- Routes: Route map
- Chief executive: Naoki Takahashi
- Website: IBAKYU Motor(in Japanese)

The IBAKYU Motor CO., LTD. (茨城急行自動車株式会社, Ibaraki Kyuko Jidosha Kabushiki gaisya) is a subsidiary company of Tobu Railway. The head office is located in Matsubushi Office.

=== Overview ===
The company was established as in 1950 as Uchiyama Un'yua and has been owned by the Tobu Group Company since 1963. That same year, it was renamed IBAKYU Motor.

It runs in the vicinity of the Tōbu Urban Park Line, Tobu Skytree Line, and the Utsunomiya Line.

=== Office ===
- Matsubushi Office
- Noda Office
- koga Office
- Iwai Garage
- Kita-Moro Garage
- Noda-Umesato Jutaku Turnroad

== See also ==
Other bus companies of Tobu Group

- Tobu Bus Group

Former companies belonging to Tobu Group

- Aizu Bus
- Toya Kotsu

Tobu Railway
