= Senjōgahara =

Coordinates: 36.7785°N 139.4428°E

Designations

Ramsar Wetland
- Official name: Oku-Nikko-shitsugen
- Designated: 8 November 2005
- Reference no.: 1553

Senjōgahara (戦場ヶ原) is a four-square-kilometre (1.5 sq mi) area in Tochigi Prefecture, Japan, in the city of Nikkō. It is 1,400 metres (4,600 ft) above sea-level.

Senjōgahara can be translated as "battlefield", referring to a mythical tale of the gods of Mount Nantai and Mount Akagi fighting for control of Lake Chūzenji.

It lies just to the east of Odashirogahara.

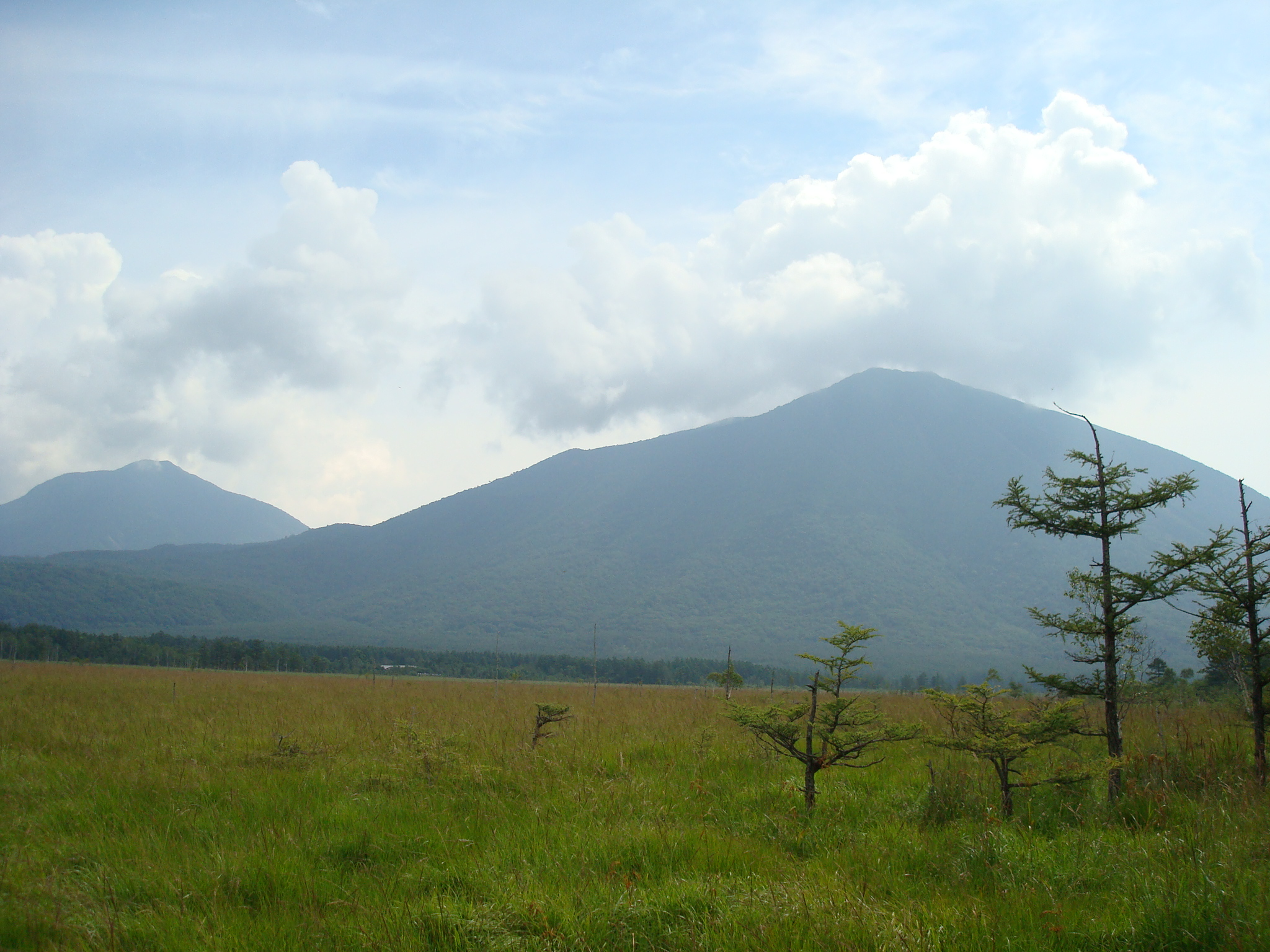
Spring

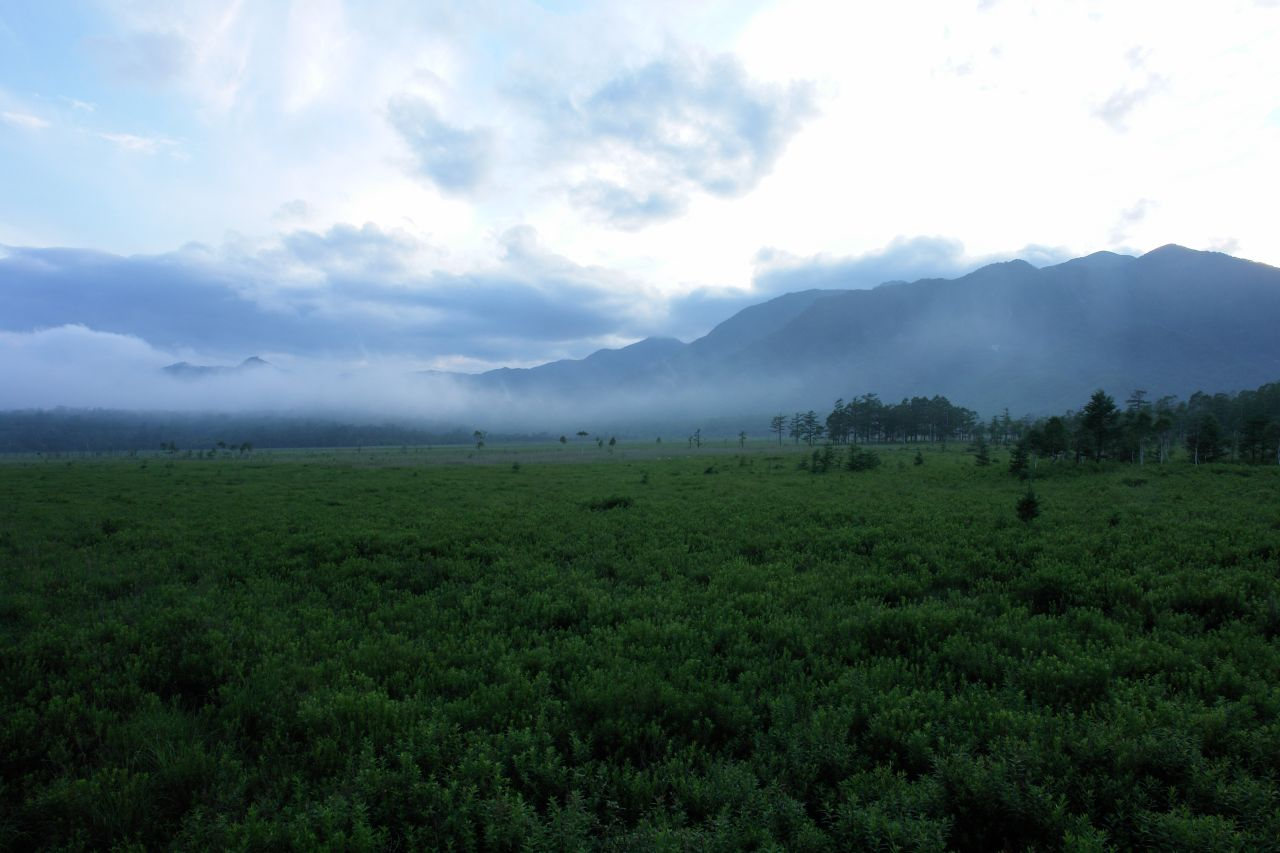
Summer

Autumn

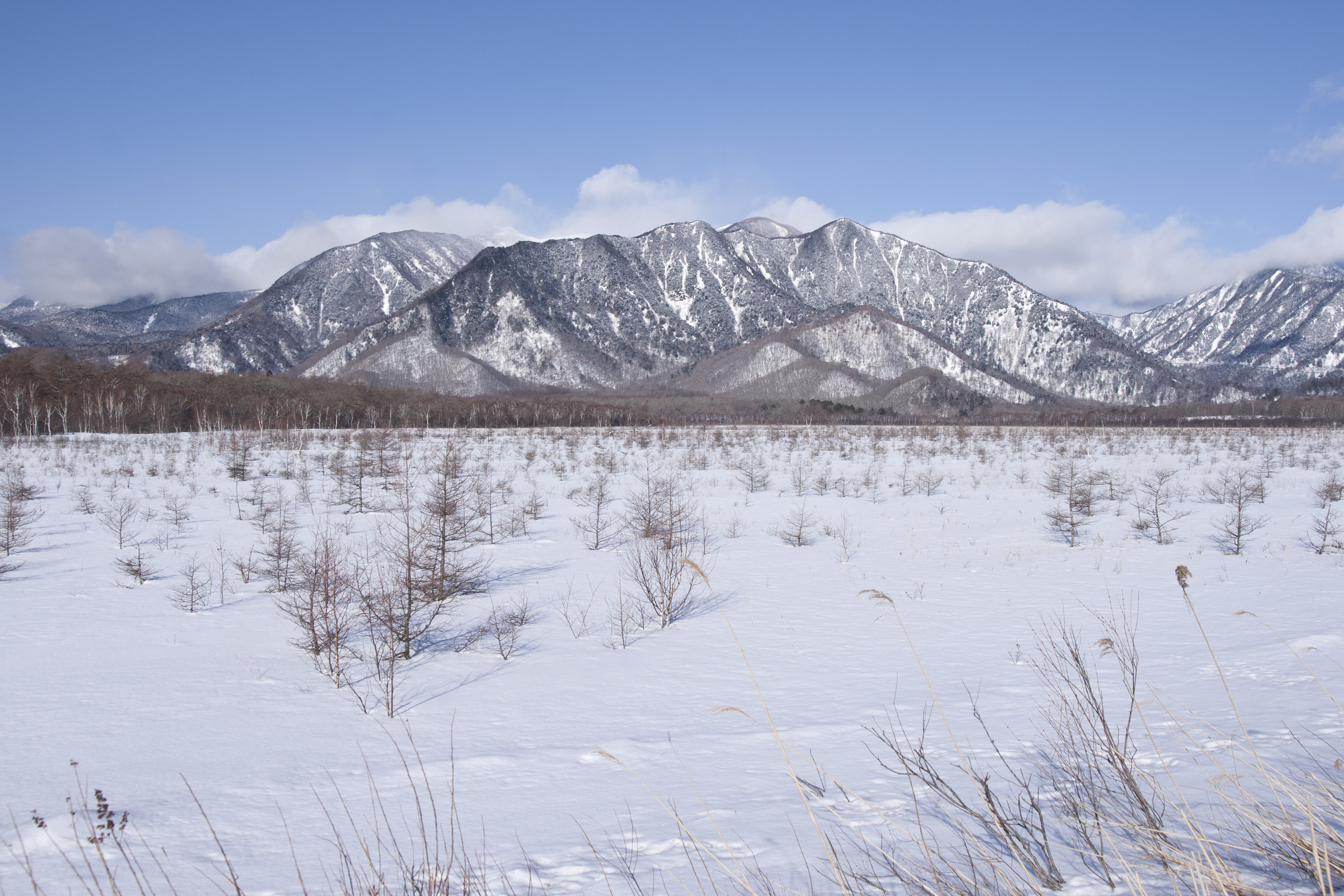
Winter
