= Akechidaira Ropeway =

Japanese aerial lift line opened in 1933

Coordinates: 36°44′14.1″N 139°30′58.2″E

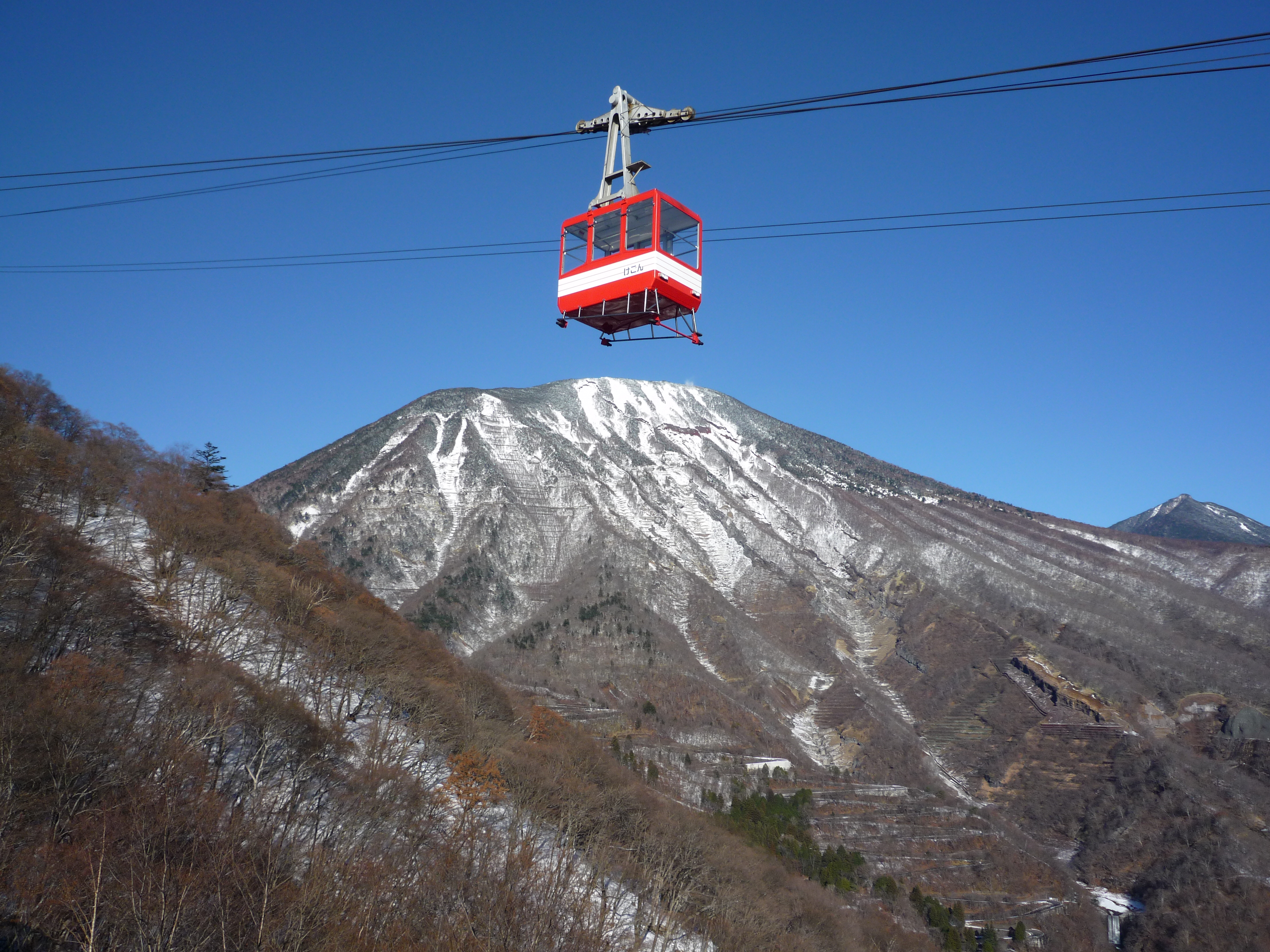
- The ropeway viewed from the Akechidaira parking area in December 2010
- Interactive map of Akechidaira Ropeway

Overview
- Status: Operational
- Character: Aerial tramway
- Location: Nikkō, Tochigi, Japan
- No. of stations: 2
- Open: 1933
- Reopened: 1950

Operation
- Owner: Nikkō-Kōtsū
- Operator: Tobu Railway
- Carrier capacity: 16 Passengers per cabin, 2 cabins
- Trip duration: 3 min

Technical features
- Line length: 300 m (984 ft)
- No. of cables: 3
- Operating speed: 2.5 m/s
- Vertical Interval: 86 m (282 ft)
- Maximum Gradient: 30°

The Akechidaira Ropeway (明智平ロープウェイ, Akechidaira Rōpuwei) is an aerial lift line in Nikkō, Tochigi, Japan, operated by Nikkō-Kōtsū (日光交通). The Tōbu Group company mainly operates bus lines in the city. The observatory has a view of Kegon Falls, Lake Chūzenji, and Mount Nantai. The line opened in 1933, and reopened in 1950.

== History ==
The ropeway was opened in 1933 by the Nikko Mountain Railway. The ropeway's operations were suspended in World War II until 1950, when Tobu Railway took over as the new operator. The ropeway was one of the four various lines that connected Lake Chūzenji and Nikkō Station. The other three lines have already been closed. One of the three closed lines' station building was converted to a drive-in, which closed in 2017.

In November 2024, Tobu Group planned to renew the ropeway in order to increase its capacities. A new ropeway that would connect with the Akechidaira Ropeway's Akechidaira Station was proposed in the same month.

== Basic data ==
- Cable length: 300 m (984 ft)
- Vertical interval: 86 m (282 ft)

== See also ==
- List of aerial lifts in Japan
