= Keihin Kyuko Bus =

Bus company in Japan

Keihin Kyuko Bus Co., Ltd.
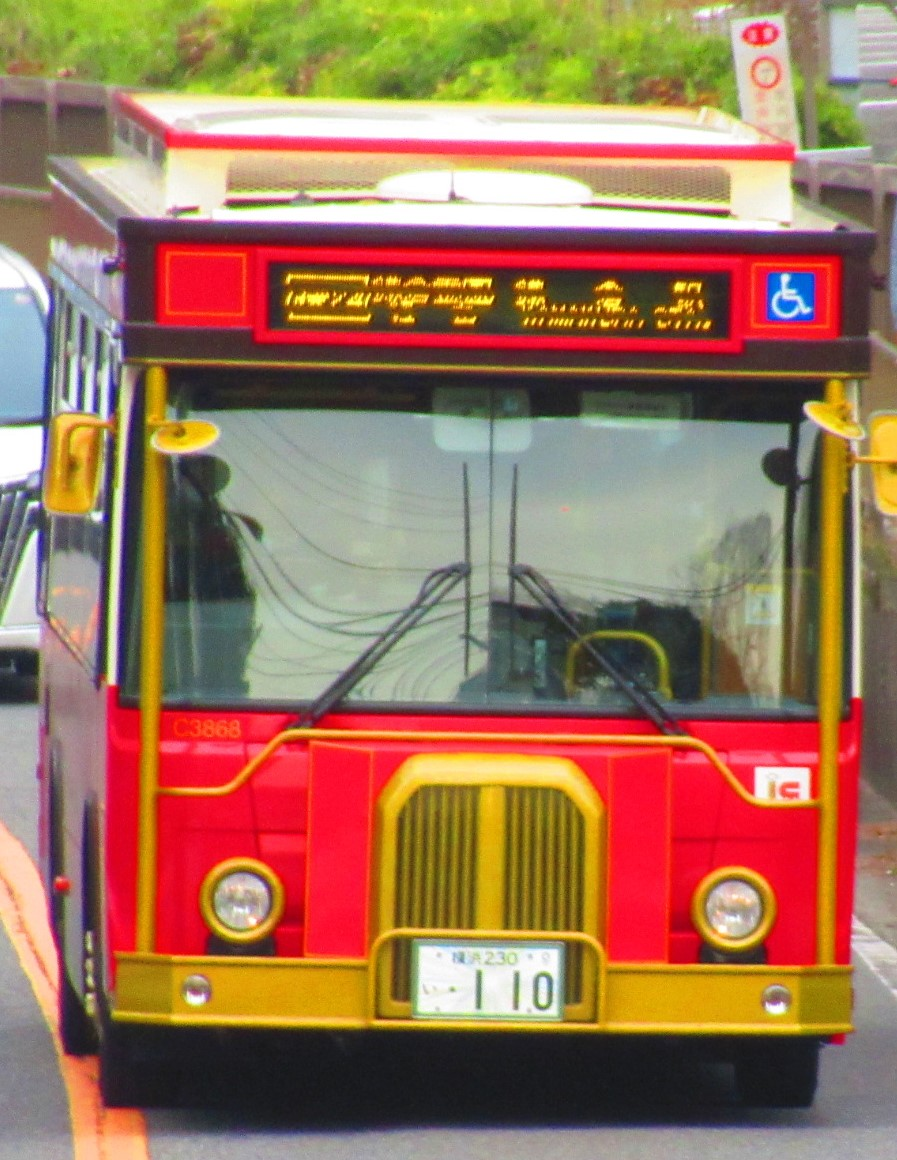
- A Keihin kyuko Bus Hino Rainbow
- Parent: Keihin Kyuko Electric Railway
- Founded: 1927 (as Keihin Electric Railway Co.); 2003 (spun off from Keihin Kyuko Electric Railway)
- Headquarters: 1-2-8 Takashima Nishi, Yokohama, Kanagawa, Japan (神奈川県横浜市西区高島一丁目2番8号)
- Service area: Tokyo and Kanagawa
- Service type: Bus
- Fleet: 944 buses (as of 2021)
- Website: http://hnd-bus.com/

The Keihin Kyuko Bus Co., Ltd. (京浜急行バス株式会社, Keihin Kyukou Basu Kabushiki-gaisha) is a bus company within the Keikyu Group which was established on 10 April 2003 to inherit all business of the Keihin Kyuko Electric Railway bus department.

== Outline ==
The bus company was established in April 2003 and has operated since 1 October 2003. Besides, the bus company was split into Haneda Keikyu Bus and Yokohama Keikyu Bus, Shonan Keikyu Bus, but the bus companies were merged into Keihin Kyuko Bus on 1 April 2018. Service area is located around Tokyo(Haneda Airport) and Kanagawa(Miura and Kamakura).

== History ==
=== Chronicle ===
Keihin Kyuko Bus was split up from Keihin Kyuko Electric Railway and had spin-off companies which Haneda Keikyu Bus and Yokohama Keikyu Bus and Yokosuka Keikyu Bus, Keikyu Kanko Bus, Toyo Kanko were.

- in October 2003: Keihin Kyuko Bus was transferred bus routes which were left from Keikyu Electric Railway.
- in June 2006:As Kamakura Office was established, changed corporation name from Yokosuka Keikyu Bus to Shonan Keikyu Bus.
- on 18 March 2007:Start to available on Pasmo in a part of bus routes.
- on 15 March 2008:Keikyu Kanko Bus withdrew from a bus department.
- on 30 November 2012:Haneda Office was discontinued when the buses departured in the day.
- on 1 April 2018:haneda Keikyu Bus and Yokohama Keikyu Bus, Shonan Keikyu Bus were merger and acquisition to Keihin Kyuko Bus. And, Haneda Office was established again.
- on 17 September:Head office was transferred to Keikyu Group Head Office which is located Minato Mirai 21 in Yokohama.

== Local bus services ==
=== Offices ===
All vehicles are put on office code because distinguish a lot of vehicles.

- Omori Office (code:M)
- Haneda Office (code:H)
- Keihinjima Office (code:K)
- Shin-Koyasu Office (code:J)
- Sugita Office (code:Y)
- Oppama Office (code:A)
- Nokendai Office (code:N)
- Horinouchi Office (code:B)
- Kamakura Office (code:C)
- Zushi Office (code:D)
- Kinugasa Office (code:E)
- Kurihama Office (code:F)
- Misaki Office (code:G)

== Bus routes ==
The bus company does not have a night bus.

=== Highway buses ===
The bus routes which "◆" have are available on IC Card (Suica, Pasmo).

- Yokohama Royal Park Hotel/ Yamashita Park/ Yokohama Station - Tokyo Disney Resort (operated with Keisei Bus) ◆
- Kawasaki Station/ Kamata Station (Tokyo) - Tokyo Disney Resort (operated with Keisei Bus) ◆
- Yokohama Station(YCAT) / Odaiba - Tokyo Big Sight ◆
- (Yokohama・Higashi-ogijima Line) Yokohama Station (YCAT) - Higashi-ogijima (operated with Kawasaki Tsurumi Rinko Bus) ◆
- (Yokohama・Ukishima Line) Yokohama Station (YCAT) - Kojima/Ukishima (Ekawa 1chome) (operated with Kawasaki Tsurumi Rinko Bus) ◆
- Yokohama Station(YCAT) - Makuhari Messe Chuo (operated with Keisei Bus)
- Yokohama Station(YCAT) - Hayama/Yokosuka◆
- Yokohama Station(YCAT) - Yokohama Hakkeijima Sea Paradise ◆
- Shinagawa Station - Gotemba Premium Outlet ◆
- Yokohama Station(YCAT) - Katsunumabudokyo Station - Ichinomiya - Isawaonsen Station - Yamanashi Gakuin University - Kofu Station - Ryuo Station (operated with Yamanashi Kotsu>
- Shinagawa Station - Sodegaura B・T - Kisarazu Station◆ (operated with Kominato Railway・Nitto Kotsu)
- Shinagawa Station - Sodegaura B・T - Sodegaura Station - Nagaura Station (Chiba)◆ (operated with Kominato Railway・Nitto Kotsu)
- Yokohama Station - Sodegaura B・T - Kisarazu Station - Kazusa Arc◆ (operated with Kominato Railway・Nitto Kotsu)
- Yokohama Station - Goi Station◆ (operated with Kominato Railway)
- Shinagawa Station - Mitsui Outlet Park◆ (operated with Kominato Railway)
- Yokohama Station - Kimitsu Station/Tateyama Station (Chiba)◆
- Yokohama Station/Haneda Airport - Mobara Station◆
- Haneda Airport/Yokohama Station - Gotemba Station - Tōgendai Station◆ (operated with Odakyu Hakone Highway Bus)
- Yokohama Station/HanedaAirport - Tobu Nikko Station/Kinugawaonsen Station◆
- Haneda Airport/Shinagawa Station - Kawaguchiko Station/Fujisan Station◆

== Vehicles ==
Keihin Kyuko Bus

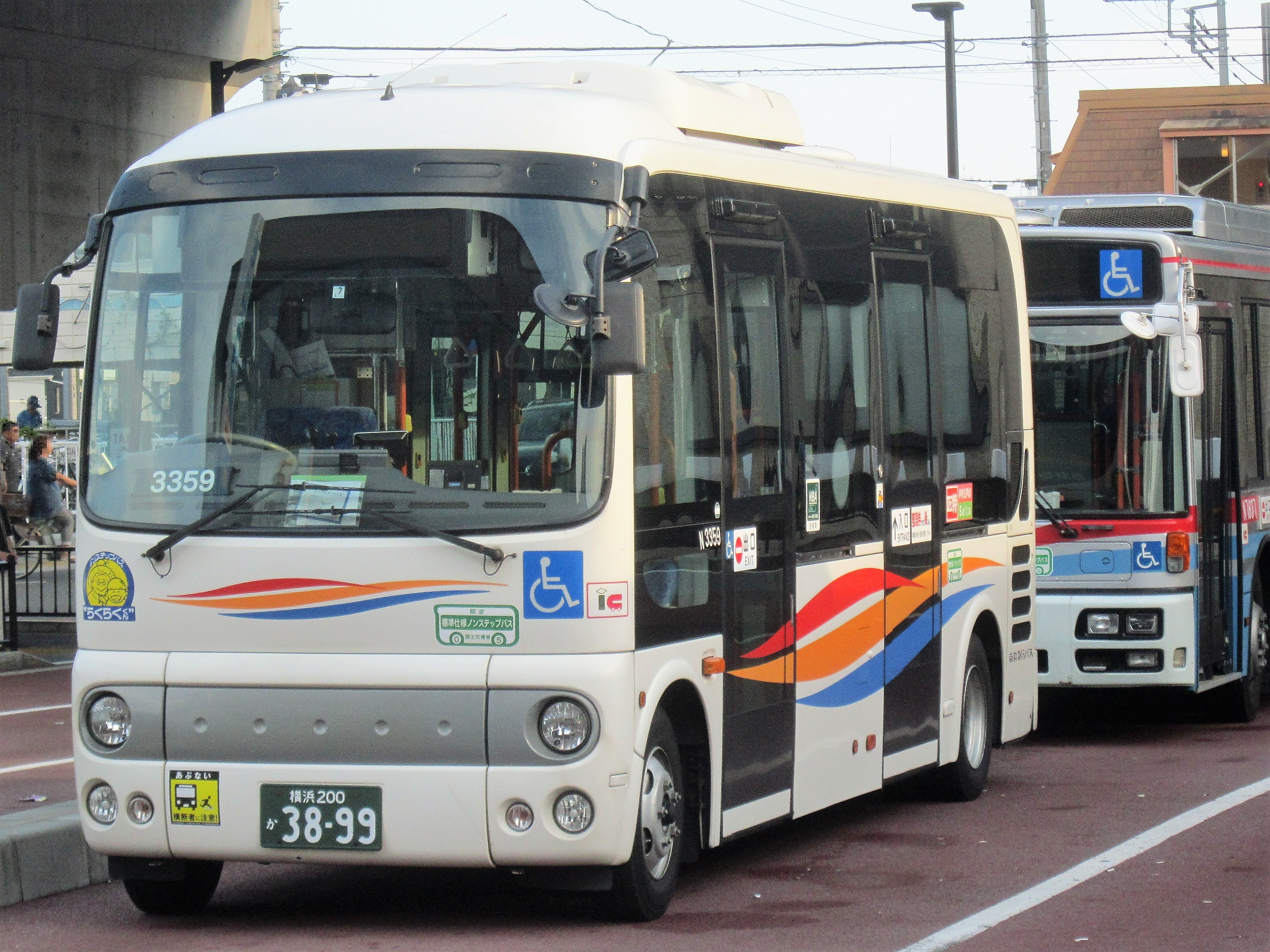
Hino Poncho

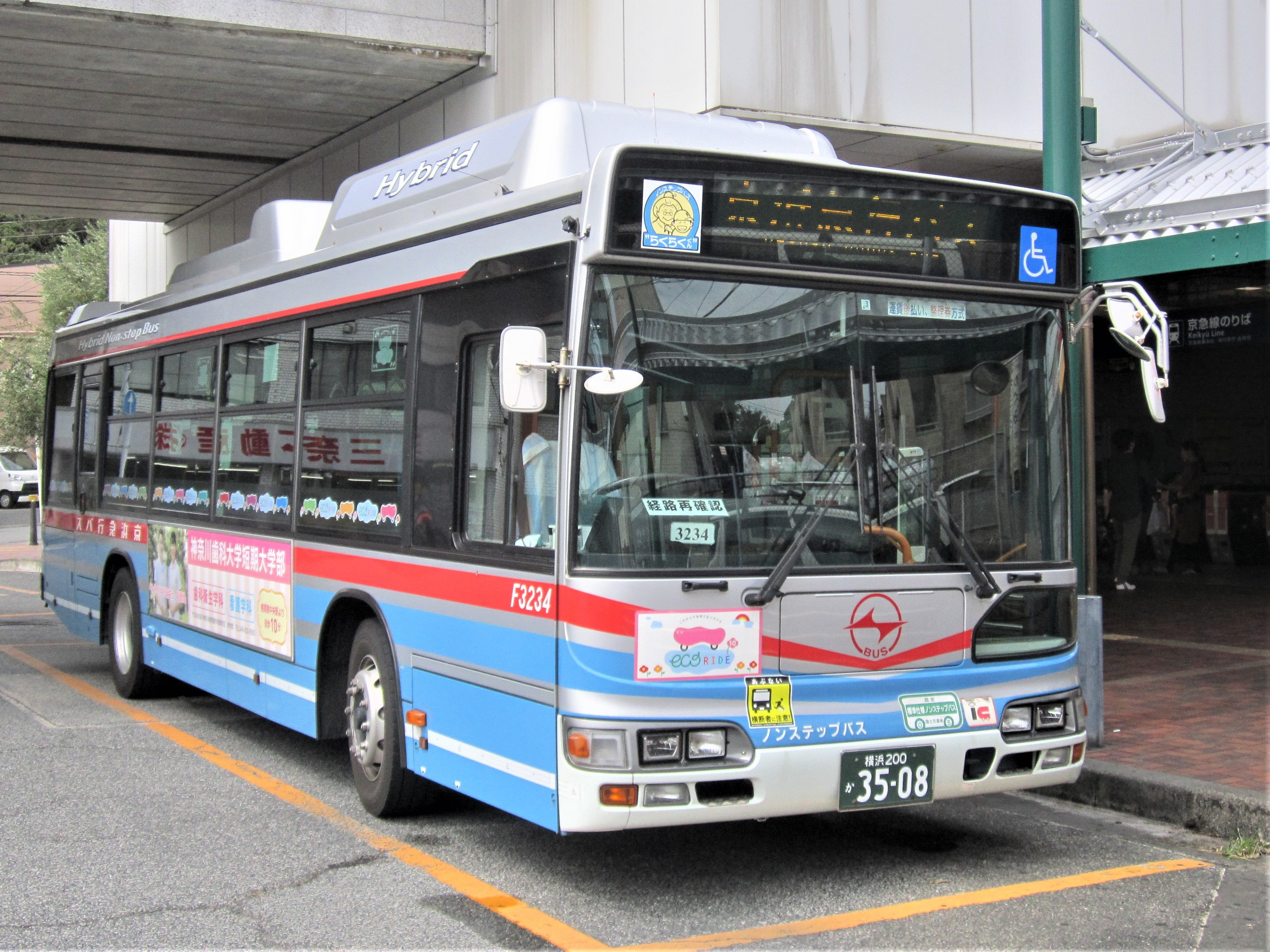
Hino Blue Ribbon
Tokyu Bus

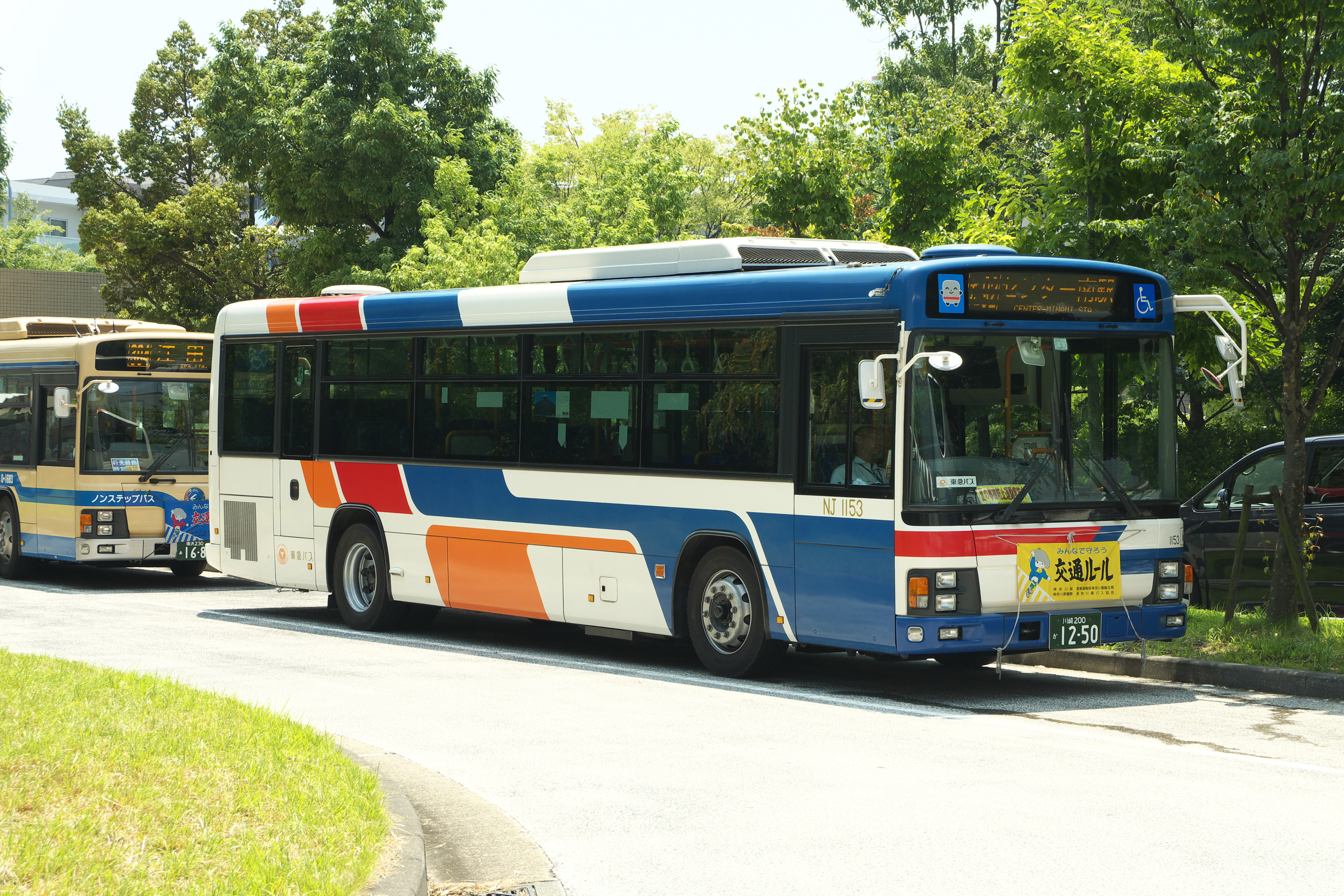
SS Mercury Color (Tokyu Bus)

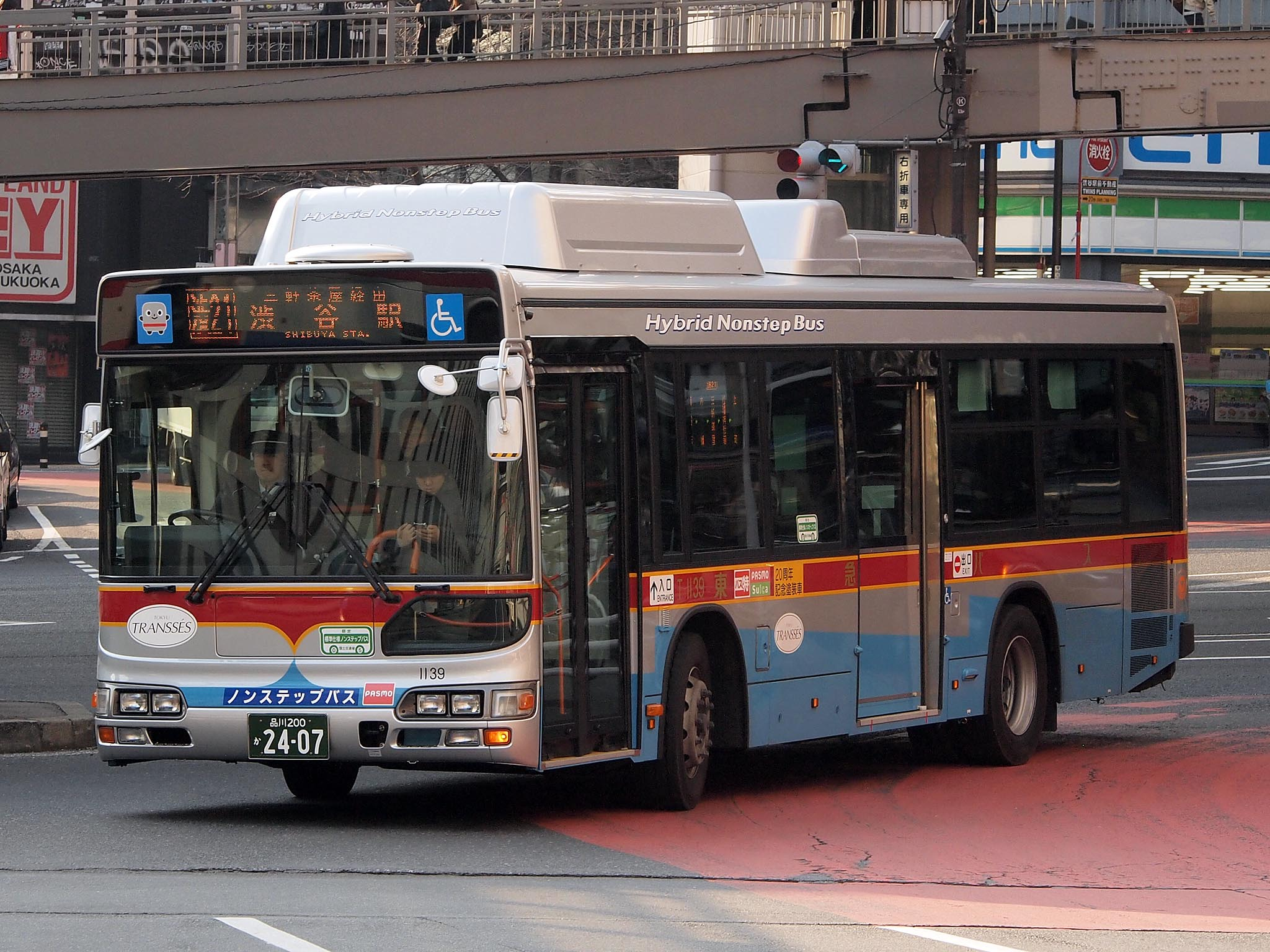
Hino Blue Ribbon (Tokyu Bus)

== See also ==
- Tokyo-Wan Ferry
