= Odashirogahara =

Coordinates: 36.77161°N 139.42322°E

Designations

Ramsar Wetland
- Official name: Oku-Nikko-shitsugen
- Designated: 8 November 2005
- Reference no.: 1553

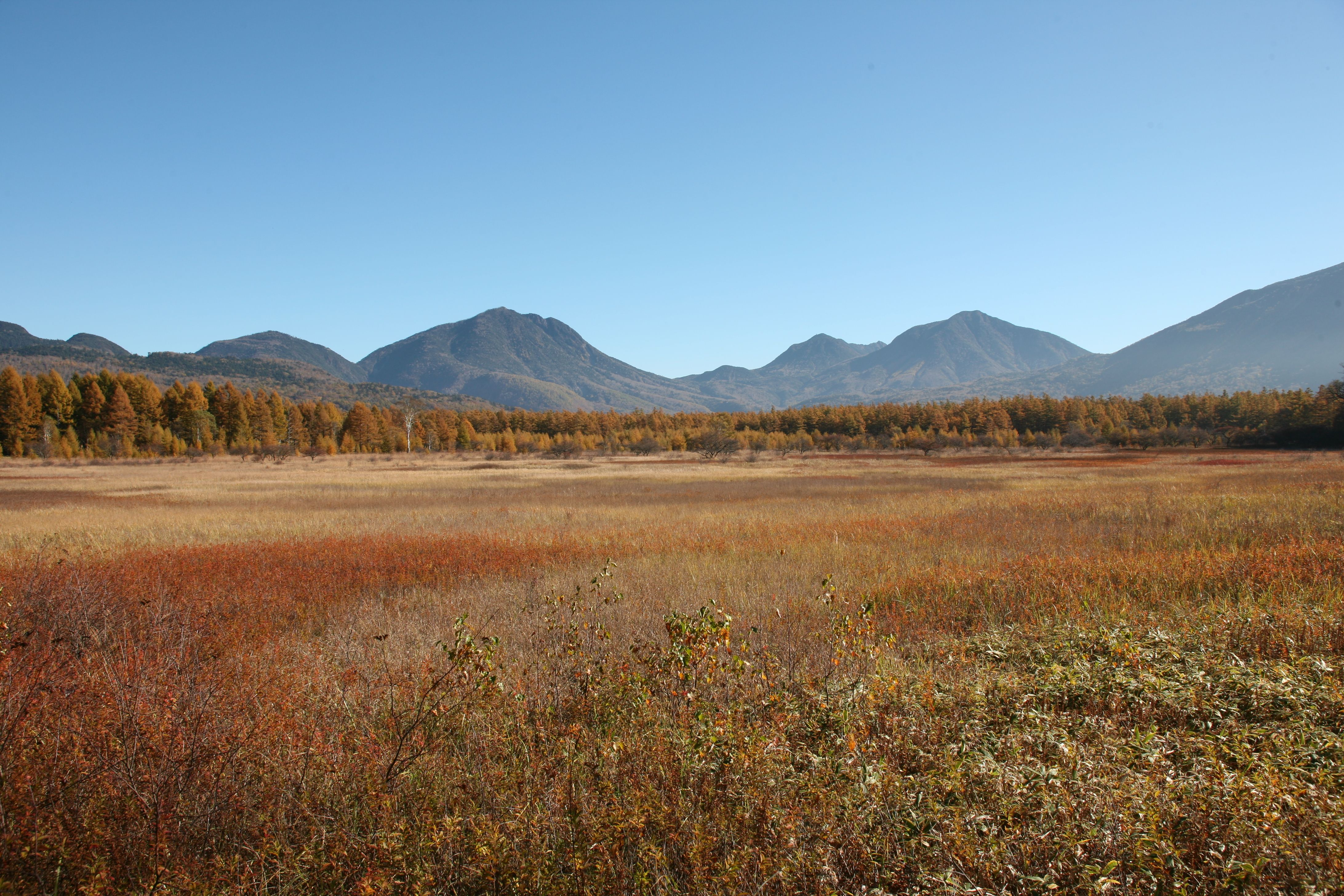
Odashirogahara

Odashirogahara (小田代ヶ原) is a marshland located near Nikkō in Tochigi Prefecture, Japan, west of the river Yukawa.

It is about 650,000 m^{2}, west of Senjōgahara.

All private car traffic is banned in this area to keep the area free from pollution. In place are low emission buses which shuttle visitors back and forth to Nikkō.
