= Isuzu Gala =

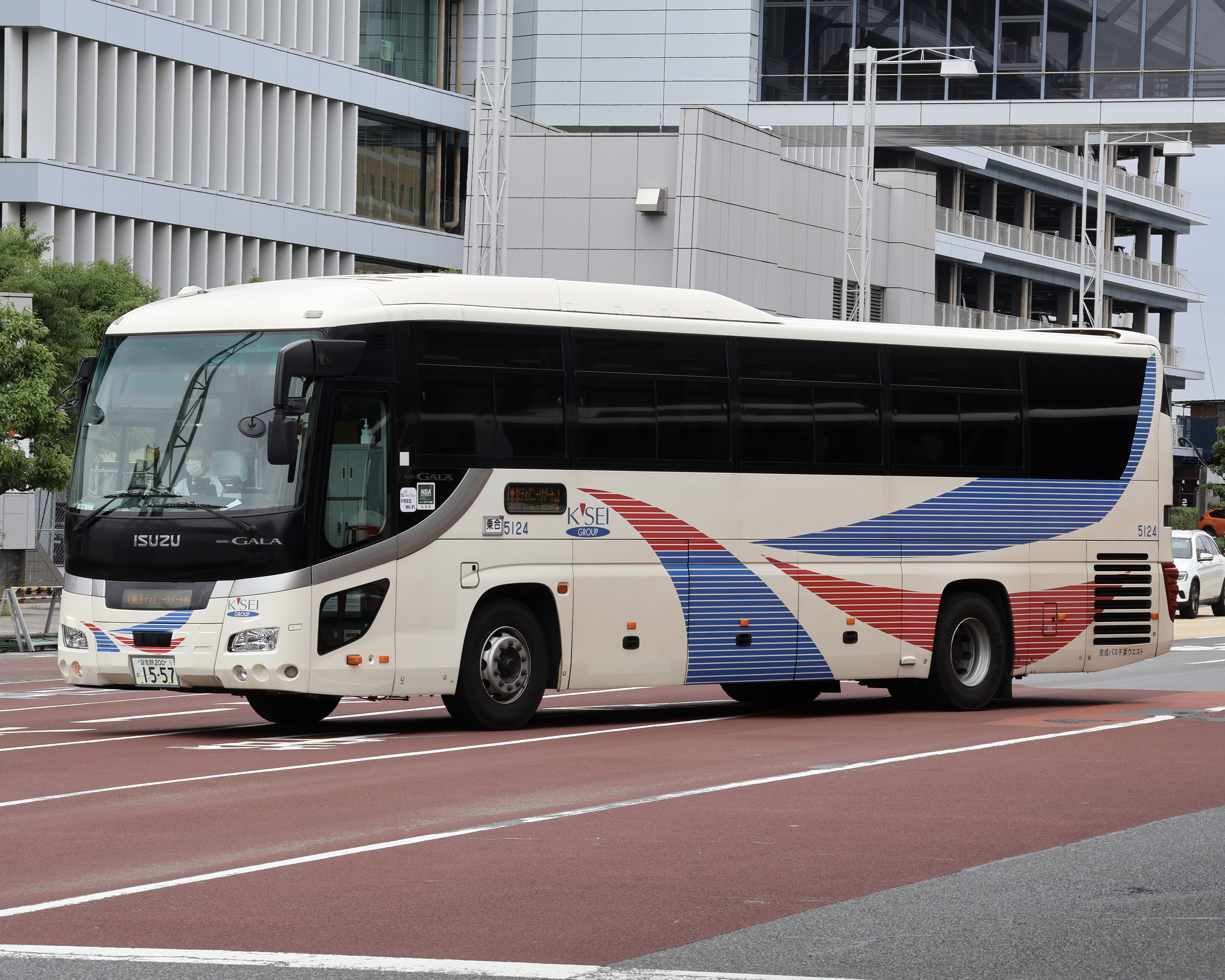

Overview
- Manufacturer: J-Bus
- Also called: Hino S'elega
- Production: 1996-present

Body and chassis
- Class: Commercial vehicle
- Body style: Single-deck rigid coach
- Doors: 1 door (front door only)
- Floor type: Step entrance
- Related: Hino S'elega

Powertrain
- Engine: 10PE1, 12PE1, 8TD1, E13C, J08E
- Transmission: 6-speed manual

Dimensions
- Length: 9m, 12m

Chronology
- Predecessor: Isuzu Super Cruiser

The Isuzu Gala (kana:いすゞ・ガーラ) is a heavy-duty rigid tourist coach produced by Isuzu through the J-Bus joint venture. The range of the first generation was available both with left-hand drive and right-hand drive.

== First generation (1996-2005) ==
- KC-LV780/781/782 (1996)
  - Equipped with driver's airbag in 1997.
- KL-LV774/780/781 (2000)
- Guangzhou Gala
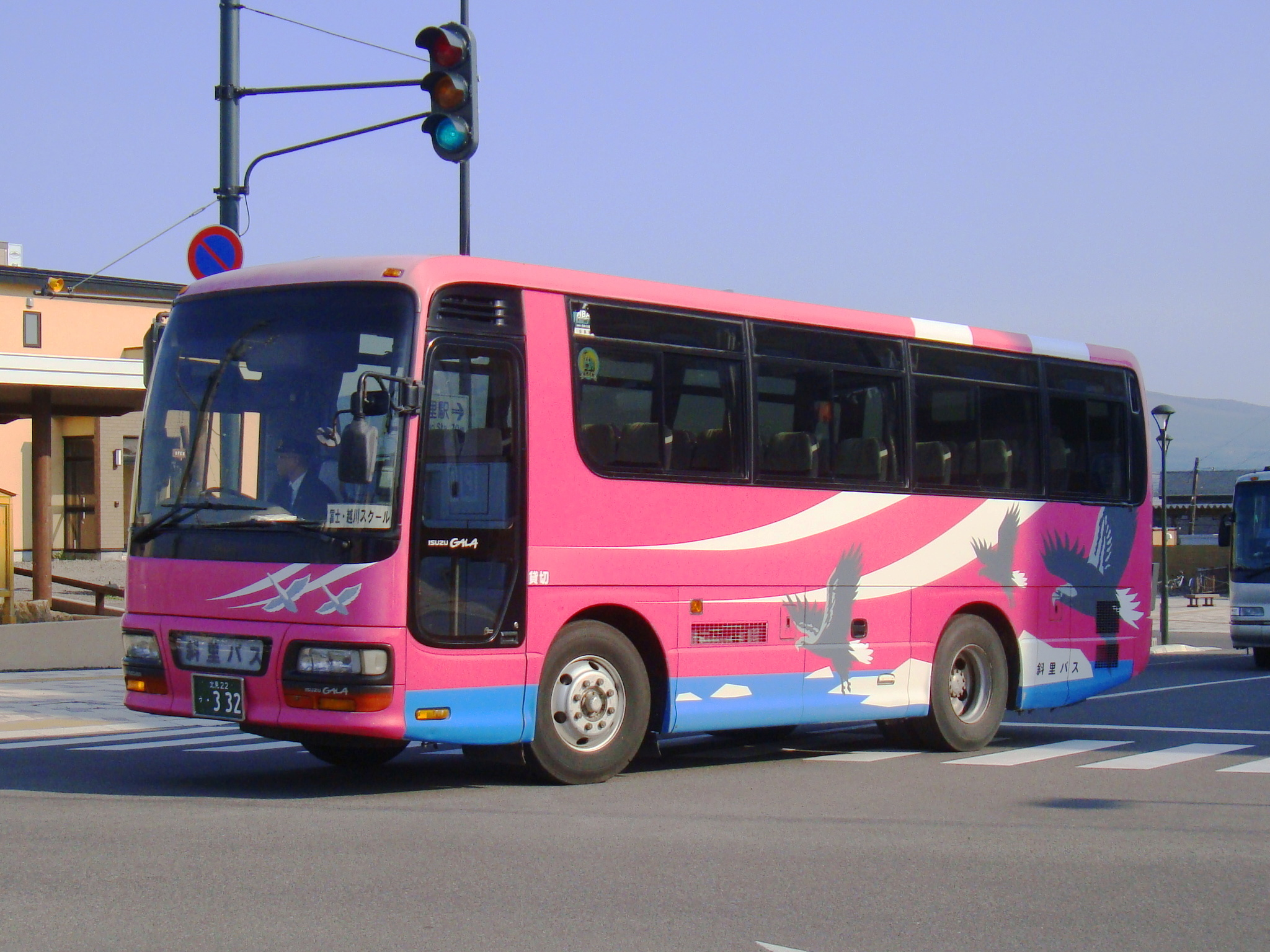
Gala HD-9 KC-LV780H1

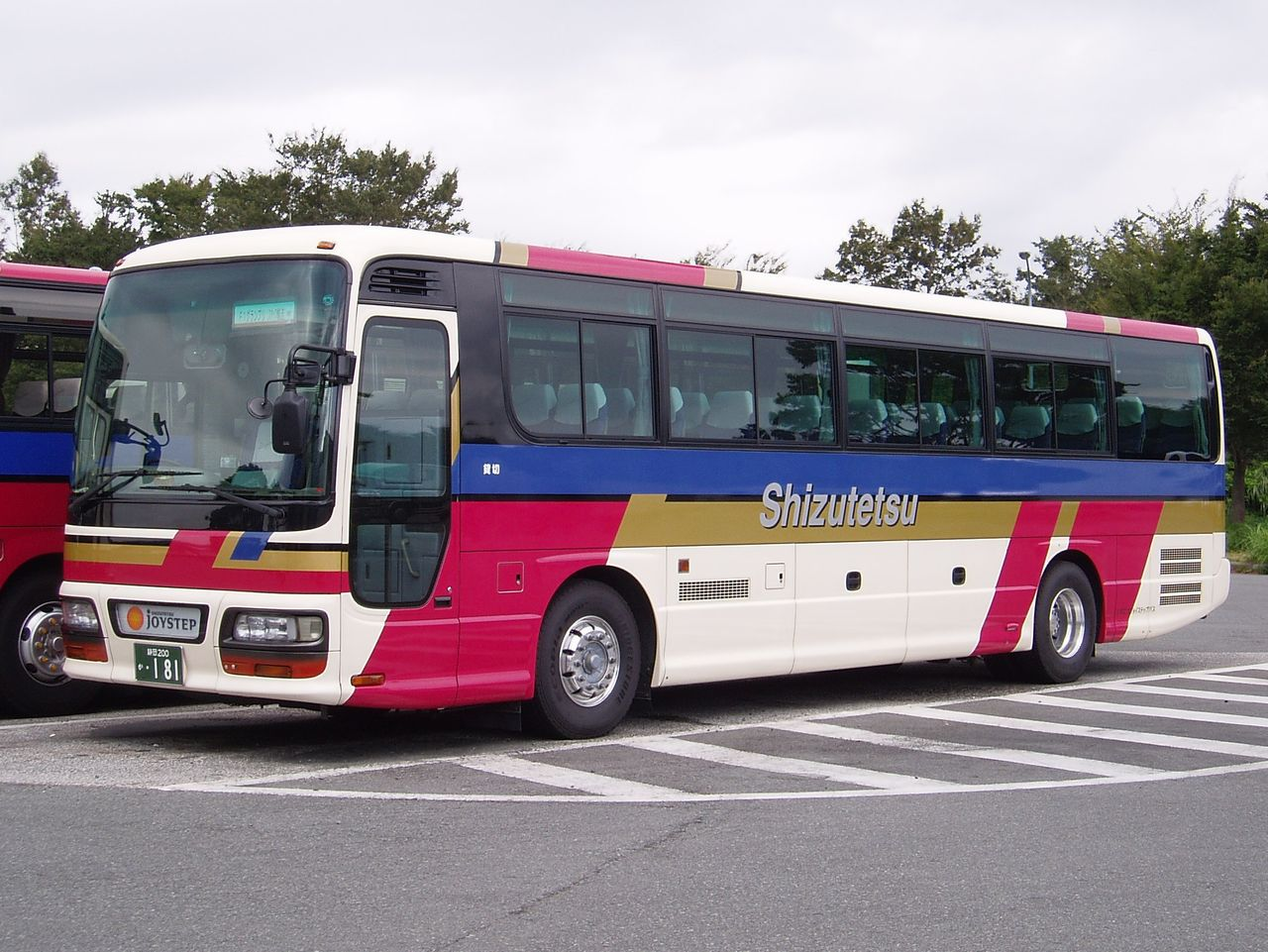
Gala HD KL-LV774R2

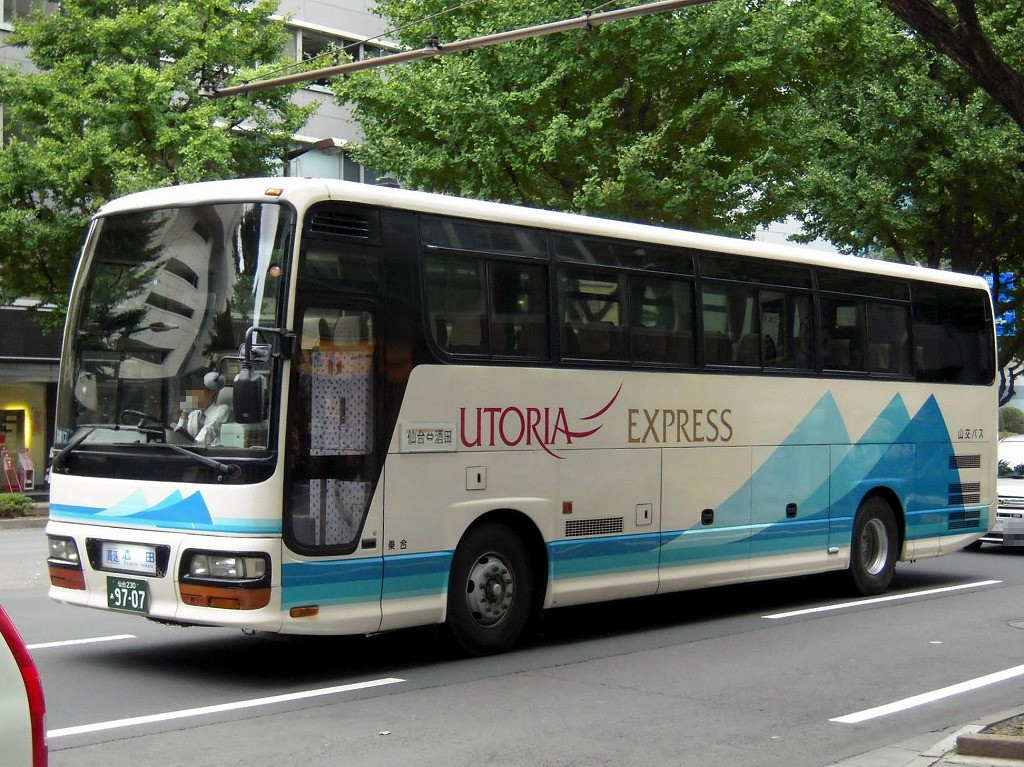
Gala SHD KC-LV782R1

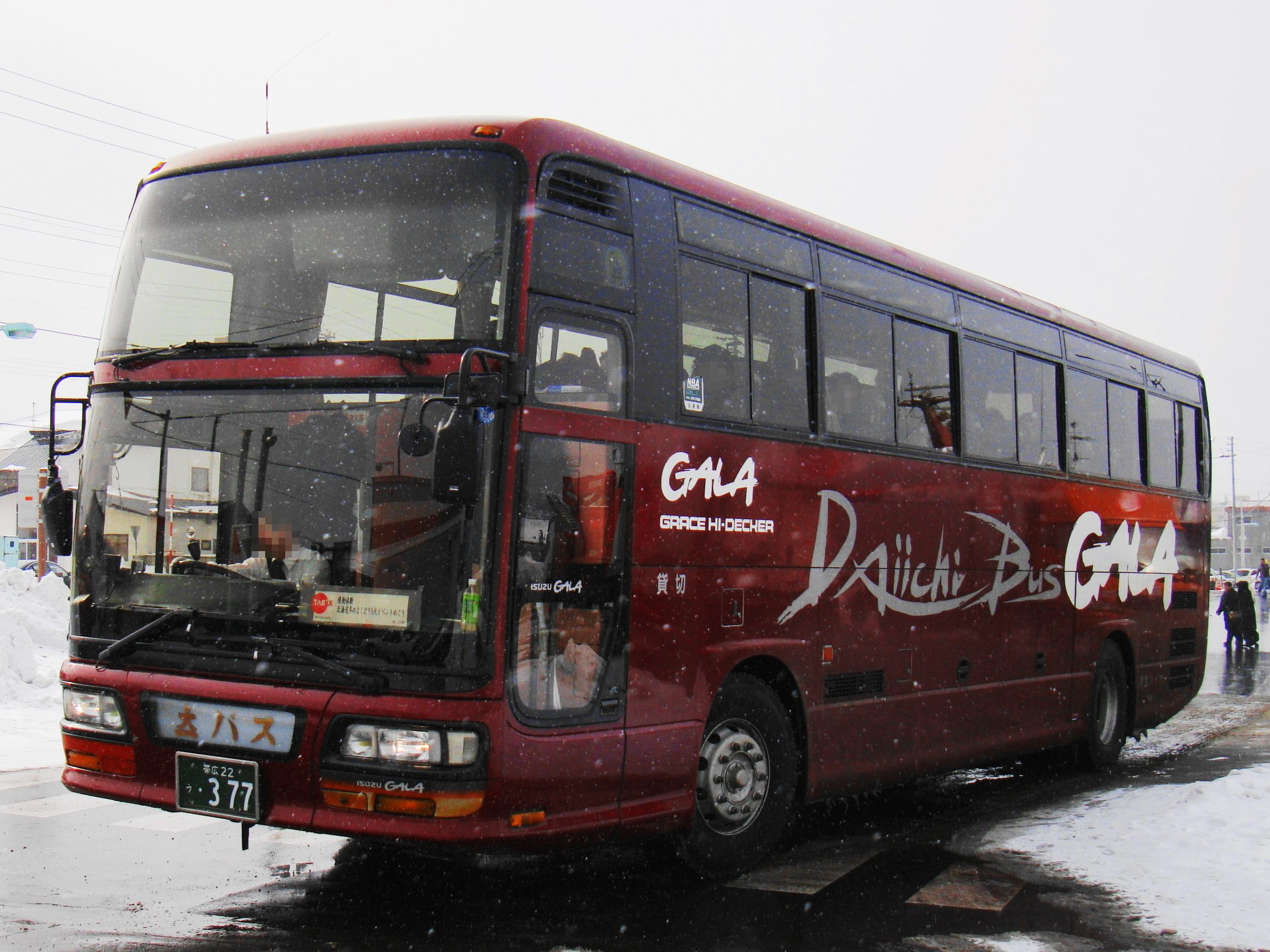
Gala GHD KC-LV782R1 (Gala sample color)

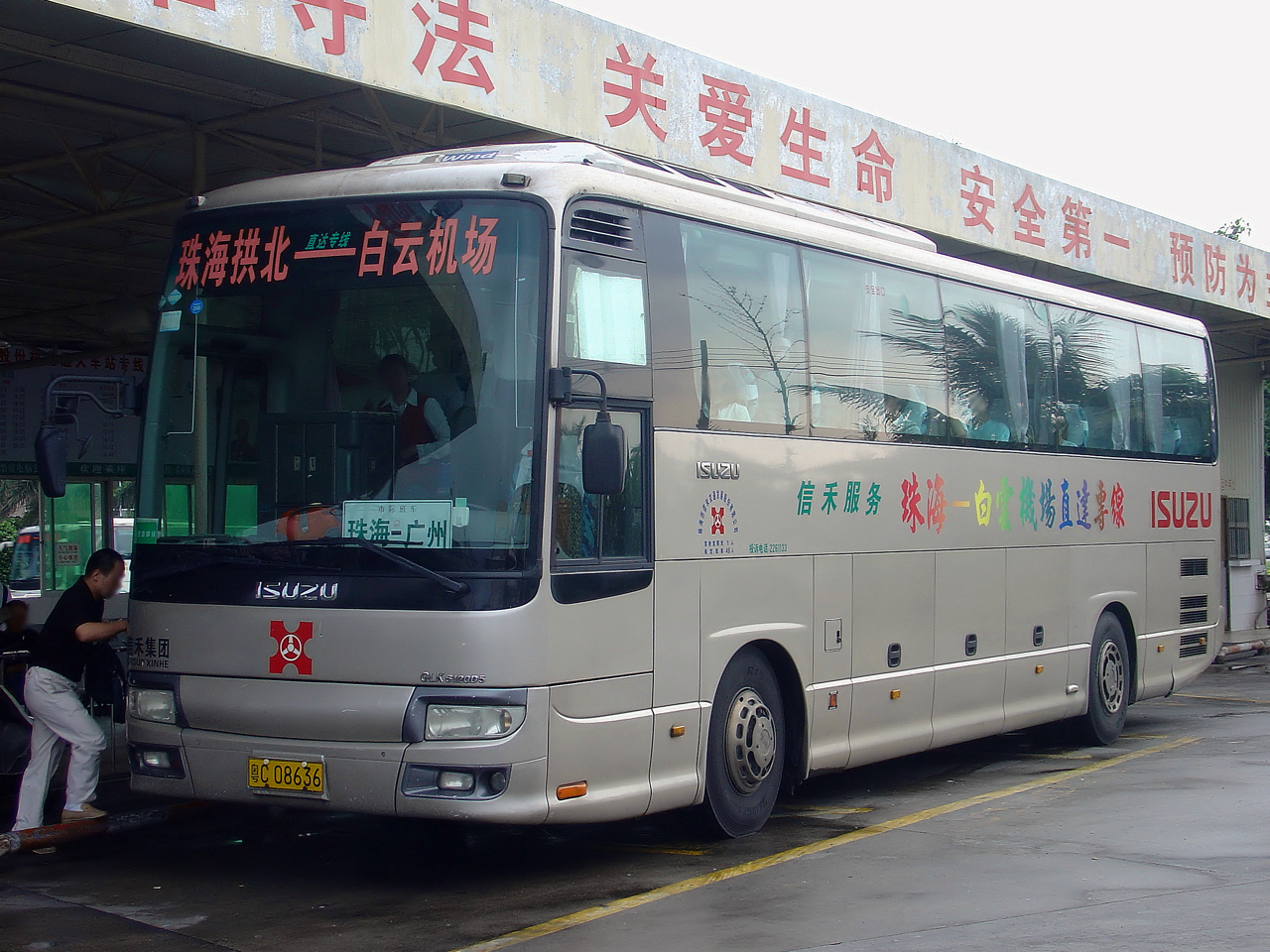
Guangzhou Gala SHD

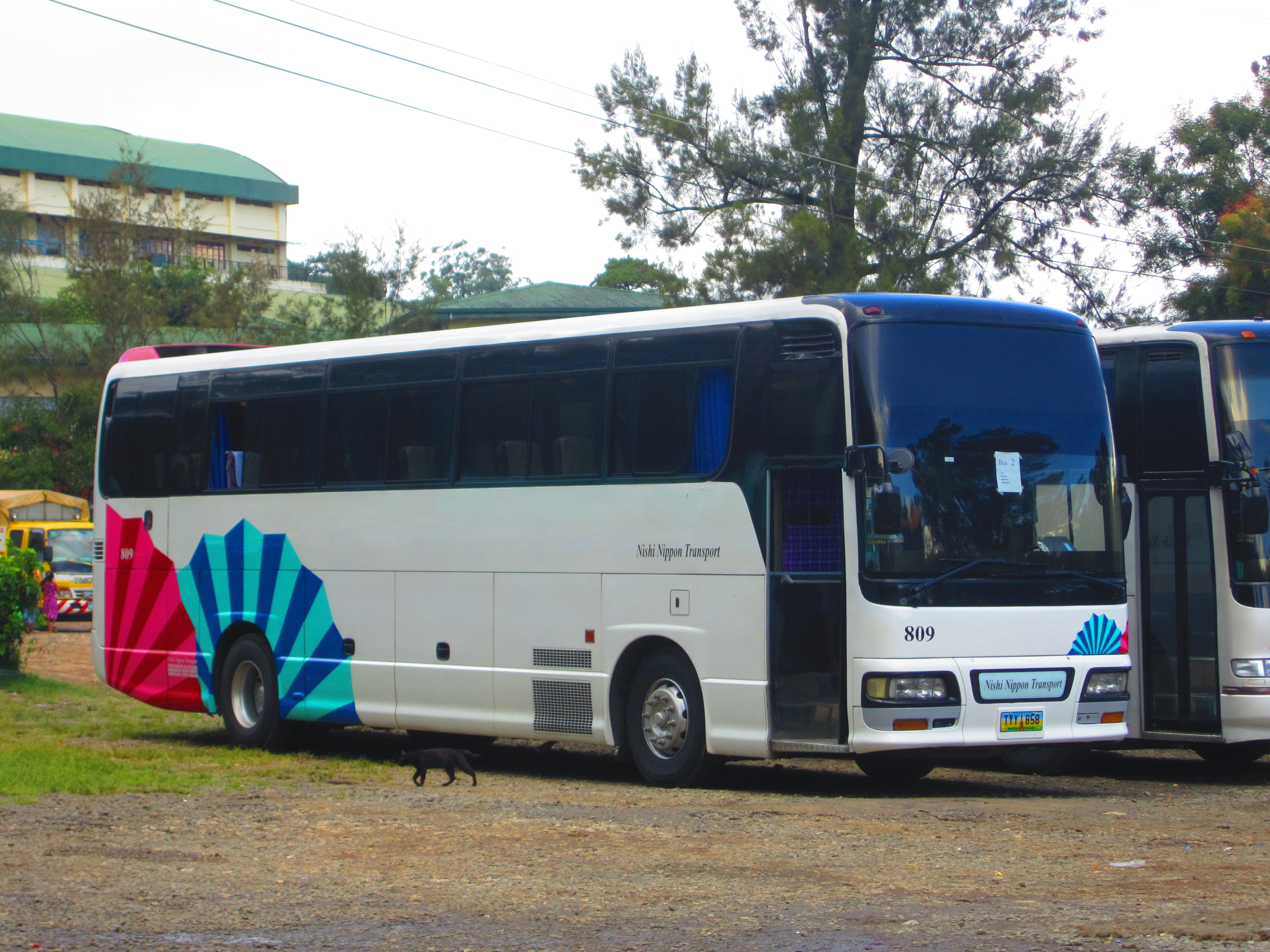
Isuzu Gala SHD in overseas operations (Philippines)

== Second generation (2005-present) ==
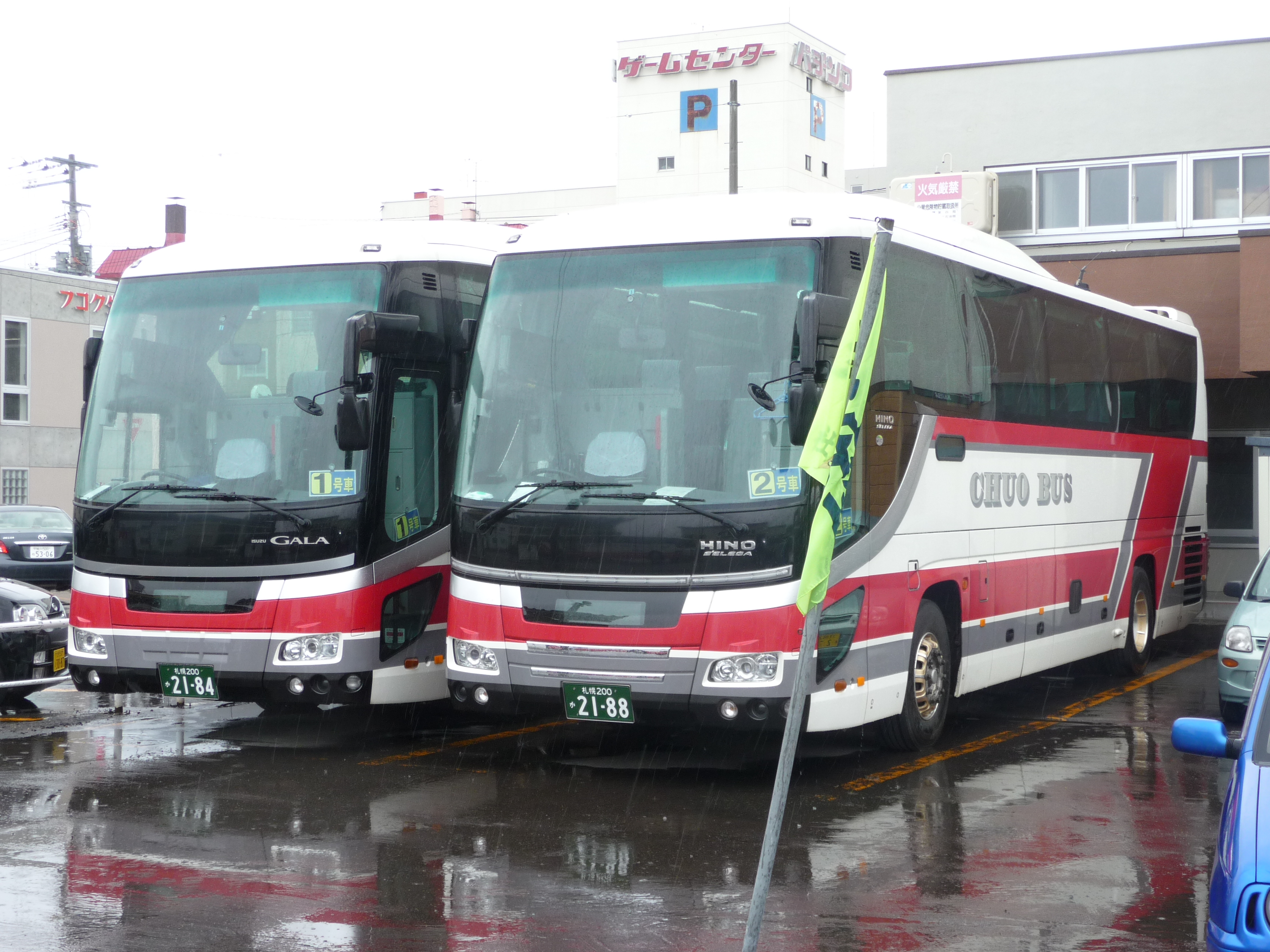
Isuzu Gala (left), Hino S'elega (right)

The Isuzu Gala second generation is a rebadged Hino S'elega.

- ADG-RU1E/8J(2005)
- PKG-RU1E/BDG-RU8J(2006)
- LKG-RU1E/LDG-RU8J/SDG-RU8J(2010)
- QPG-RU1E/QRG-RU1A/LDG-RU8J/SDG-RU8J (2012)
- QRG-RU1E/QRG-RU1A/LDG-RU8J/SDG-RU8J (2014)
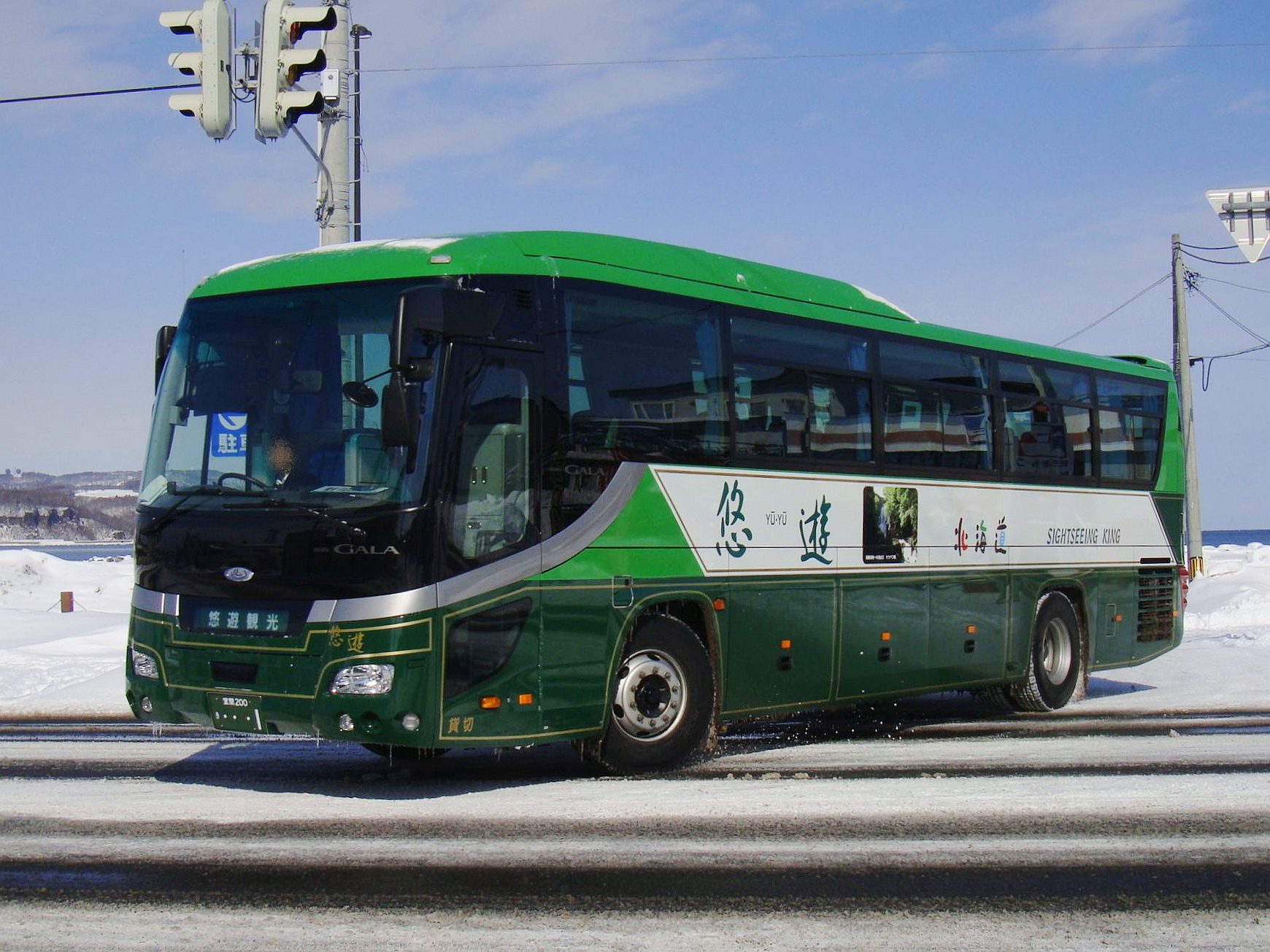
Gala HD LKG-RU1ESBJ

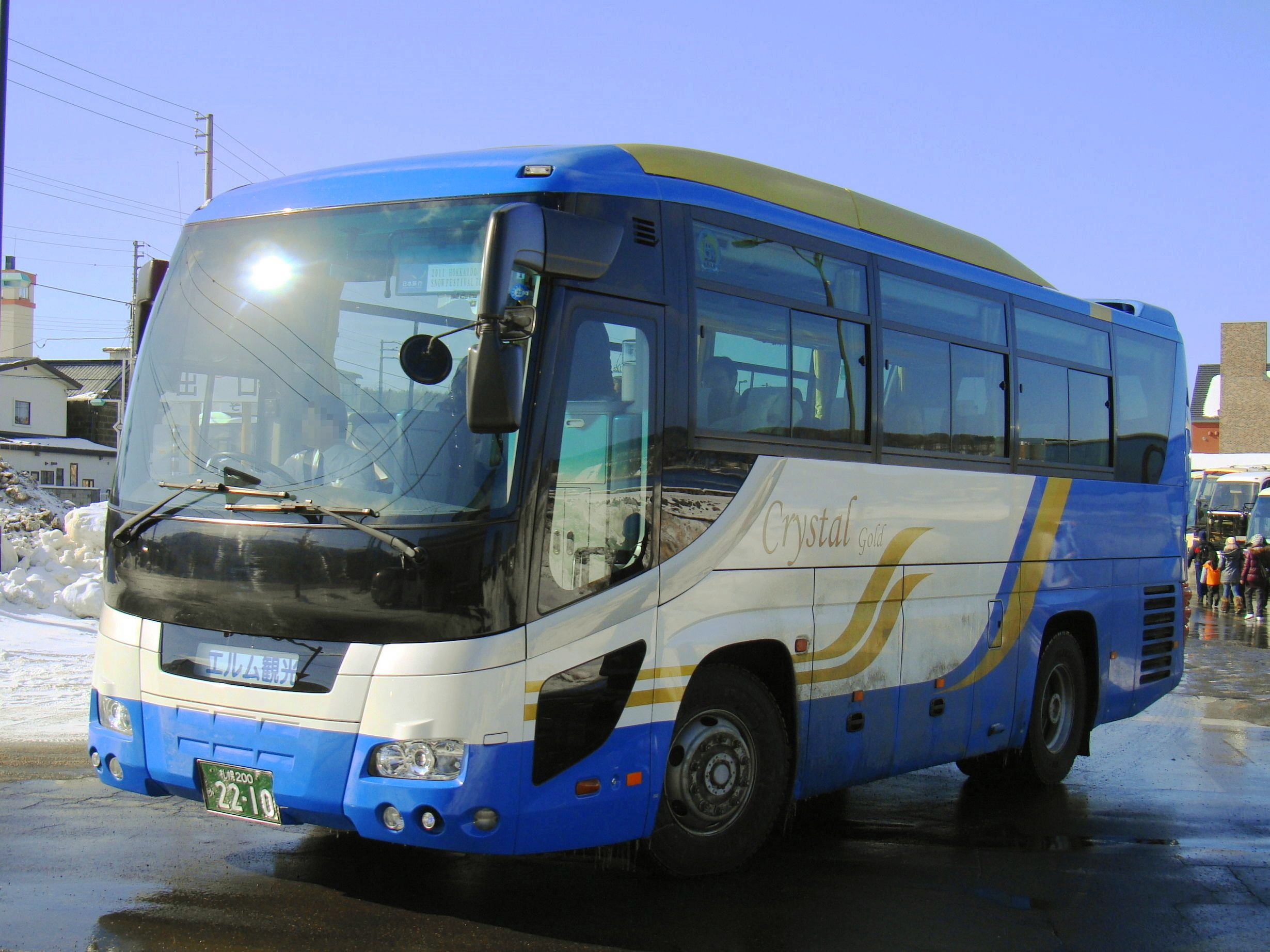
Gala HD-9 BDG-RU8JHAJ

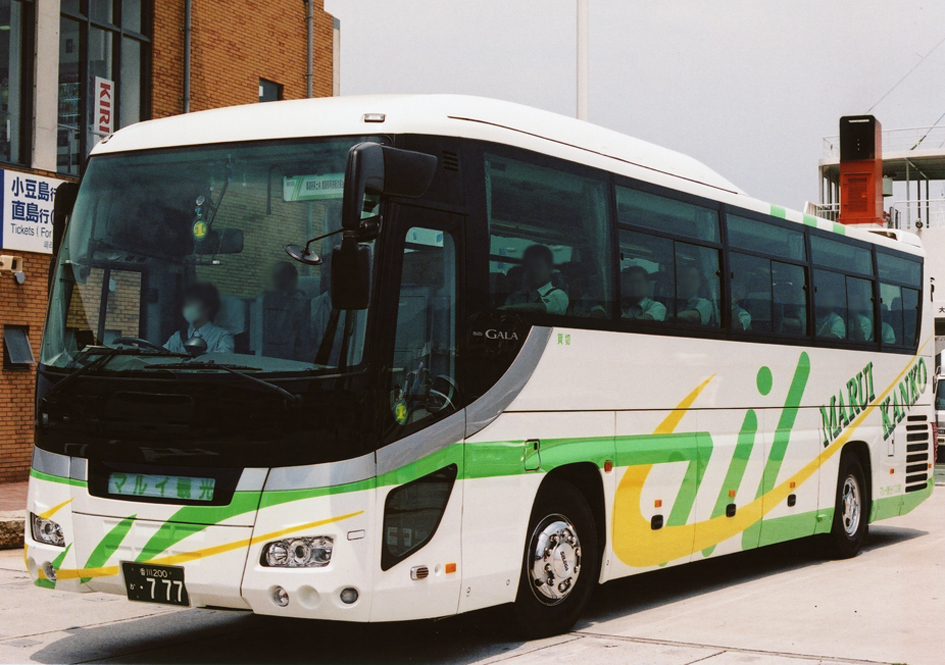
Gala HD PKG-RU1ESAJ

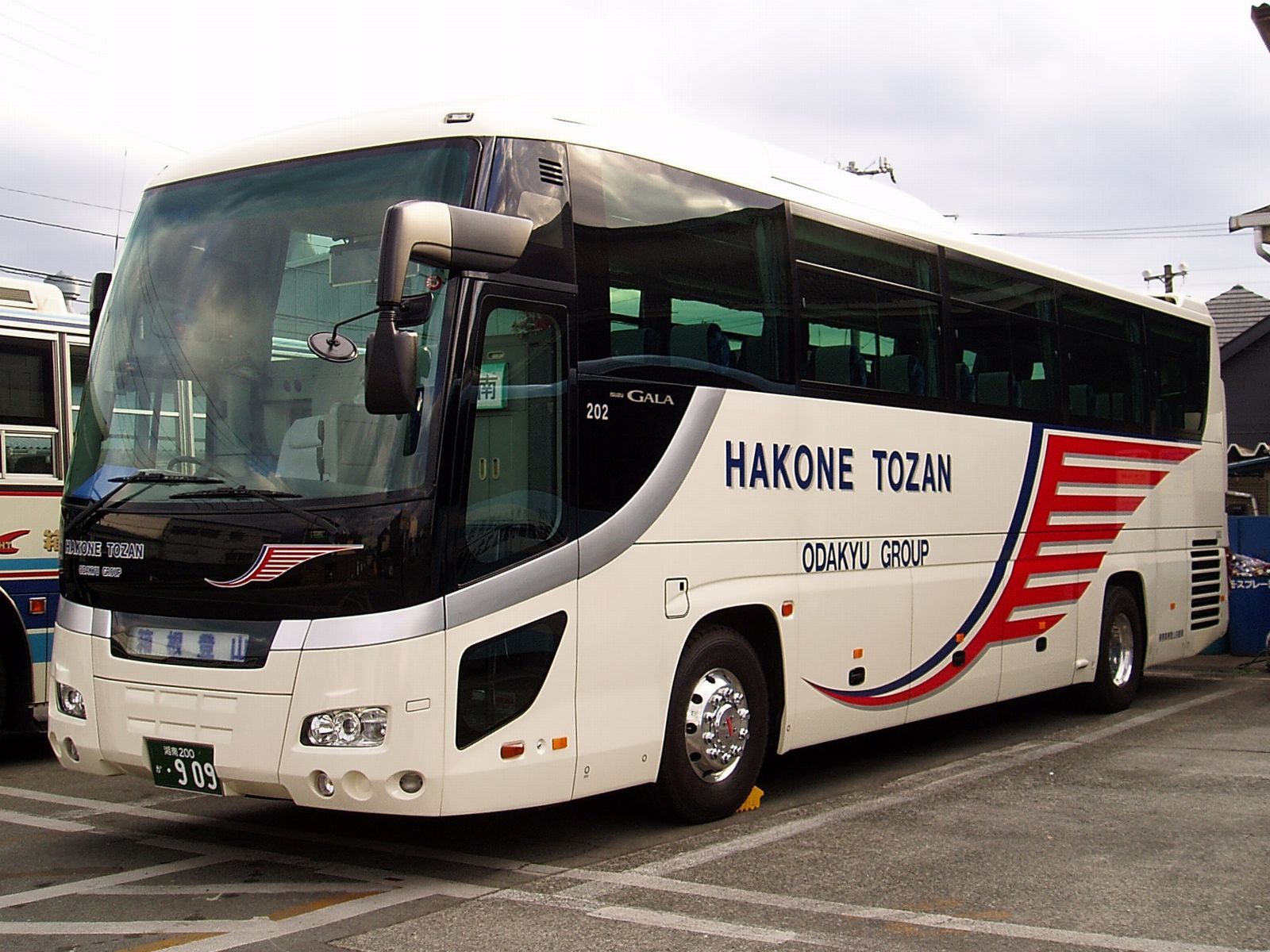
Gala SHD ADG-RU1ESAJ

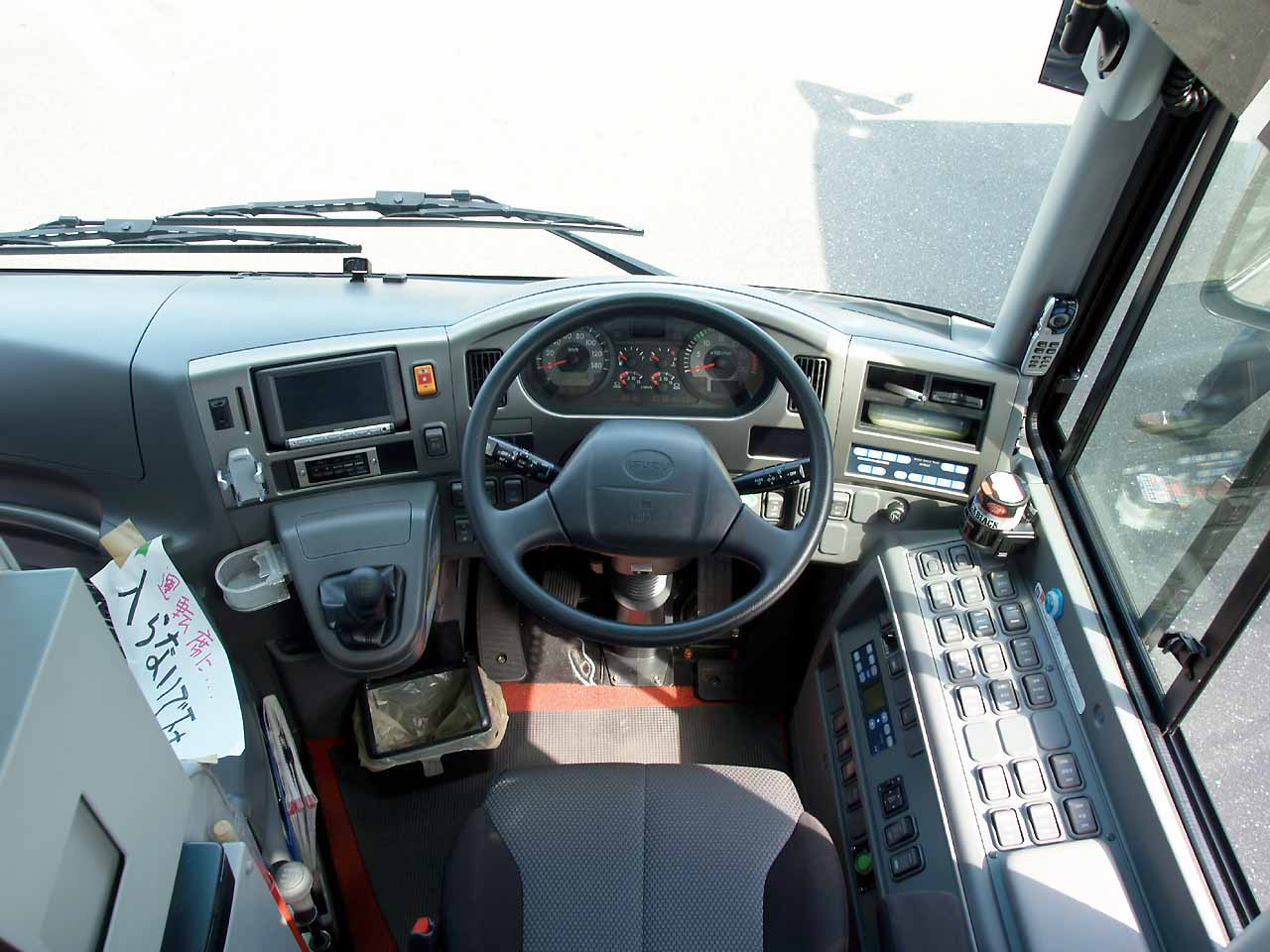
Gala cockpit

== Model lineup ==
- First generation
  - Gala I HD (Hi-decker) 12m
  - Gala II SHD (Super hi-decker) 12m
  - Gala III GHD (Grace hi-decker) 12m
  - HD-9 9m
- Second generation
  - SHD 12m
  - HD 12m
  - HD9 9m

== See also ==
- List of buses
