= Hino S'elega =

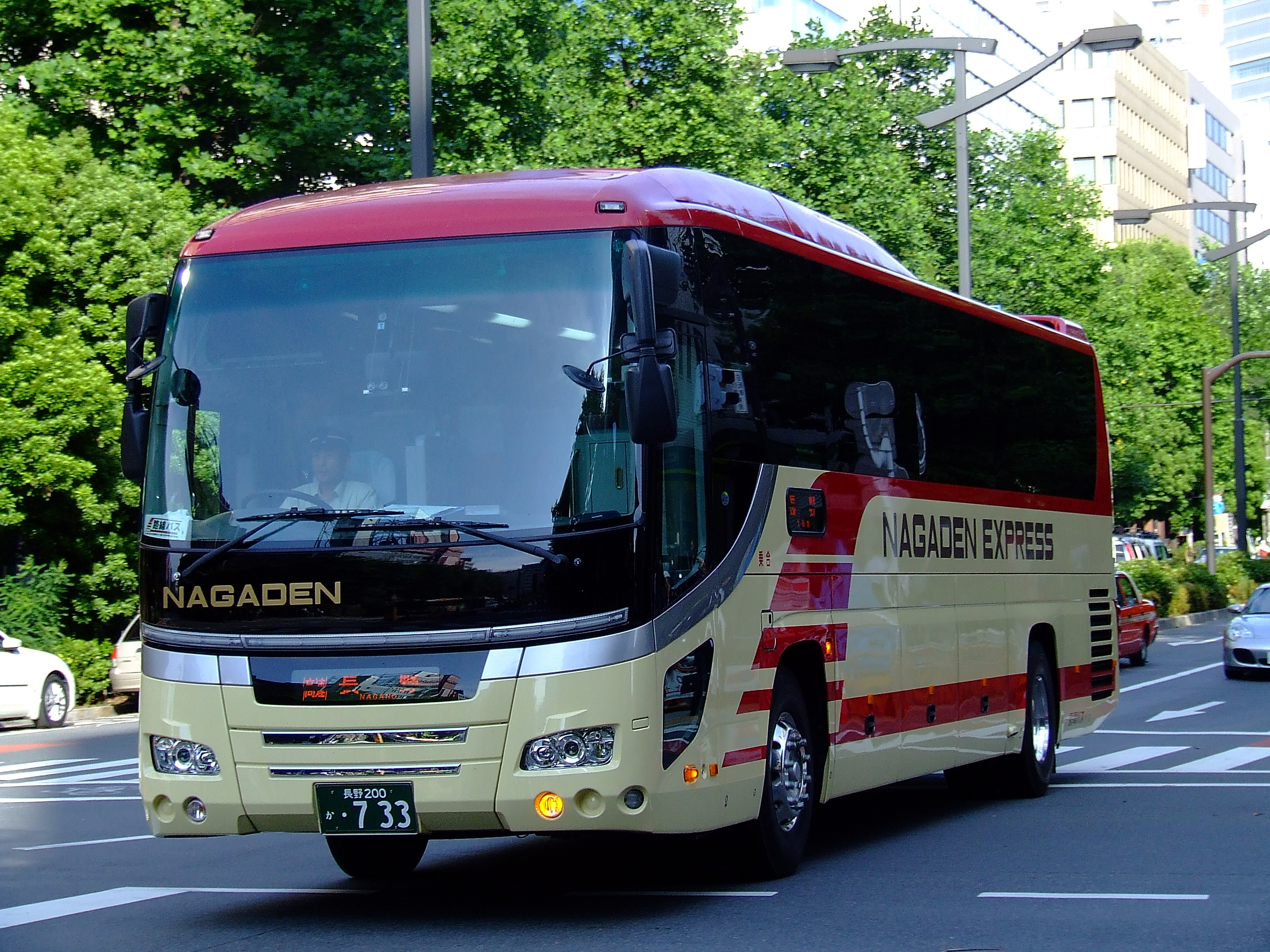

Overview
- Manufacturer: J-Bus
- Also called: Isuzu Gala
- Production: 1990–present

Body and chassis
- Class: Commercial vehicle
- Body style: Single-deck coach
- Related: Isuzu Gala (Second Generation)

Powertrain
- Engine: F17D, F20C, F21C, P11C, E13C, J08E
- Transmission: 6-speed manual

Chronology
- Predecessor: Hino Blue Ribbon

The Hino S'elega (kana:日野・セレガ) is a heavy-duty passenger coach produced by Hino Motors through the J-Bus joint-venture. They have primarily served as a tourist coach since 1990. The name is derived from the words Sexy and ELEGAnt.

== Predecessors ==
=== Hino tourist coach ===
- RX10 (1960)
- RA100/120 (1963)
- RA900 (1969)
- RV100 (1969)
- RV730/750/530/550 (1972)
- RV731/741/761/531/541/561 (1978)
- K-RV732/742/762/531/541/561 (1980)
- P-RY638AA (1985)

=== RS/RU-series ===
- RS120/140/320/360 (1977)
- K-RS121/141/161/320/340/360 (1980)
- K-RU63/60 (1982)
- P-RU63/60 (1984)

== First generation (1990) ==
=== S'elega (1990–2000) ===
- U-RU1/2/3/4 (1990)
  - Wheelbase RU1/2: 6.5 m (21 ft) (long) / RU3/4: 6.2 m (20 ft) (short)
- KC-RU1/2/3/4 (1995)
  - Wheelbase (6.2 meter) (short)
  - Jake brake (named Hino Engine Retarder) equipped: GD/GJ (standard) FD/FS (optional)
  - Hydraulic retarder: optional
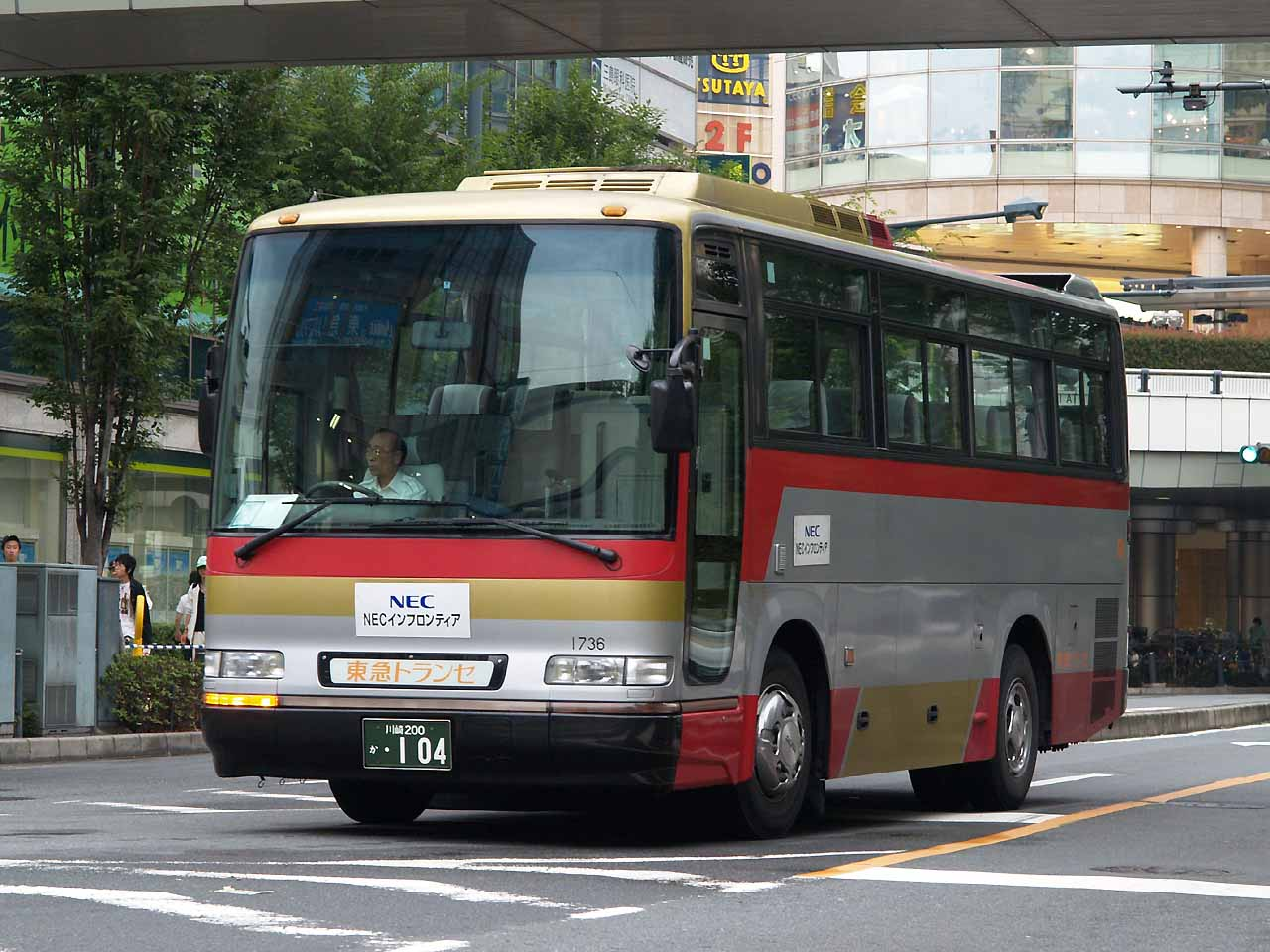
S'elega FC (KC-RU1JHCB)

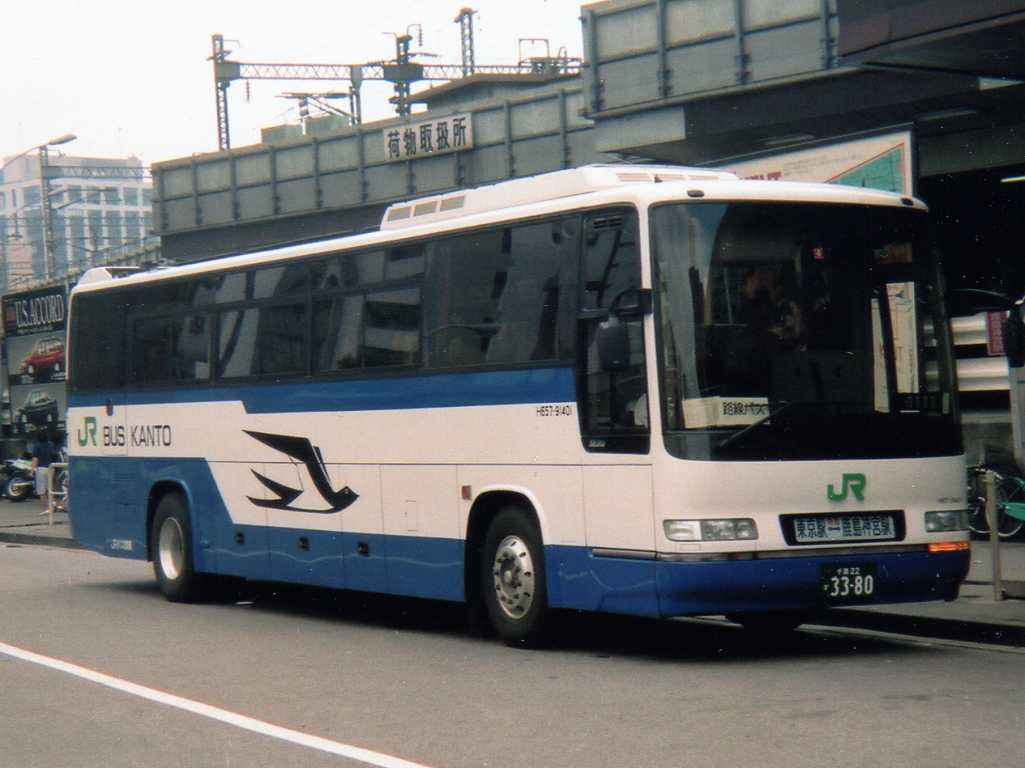
S'elega FD (U-RU3FTAB)

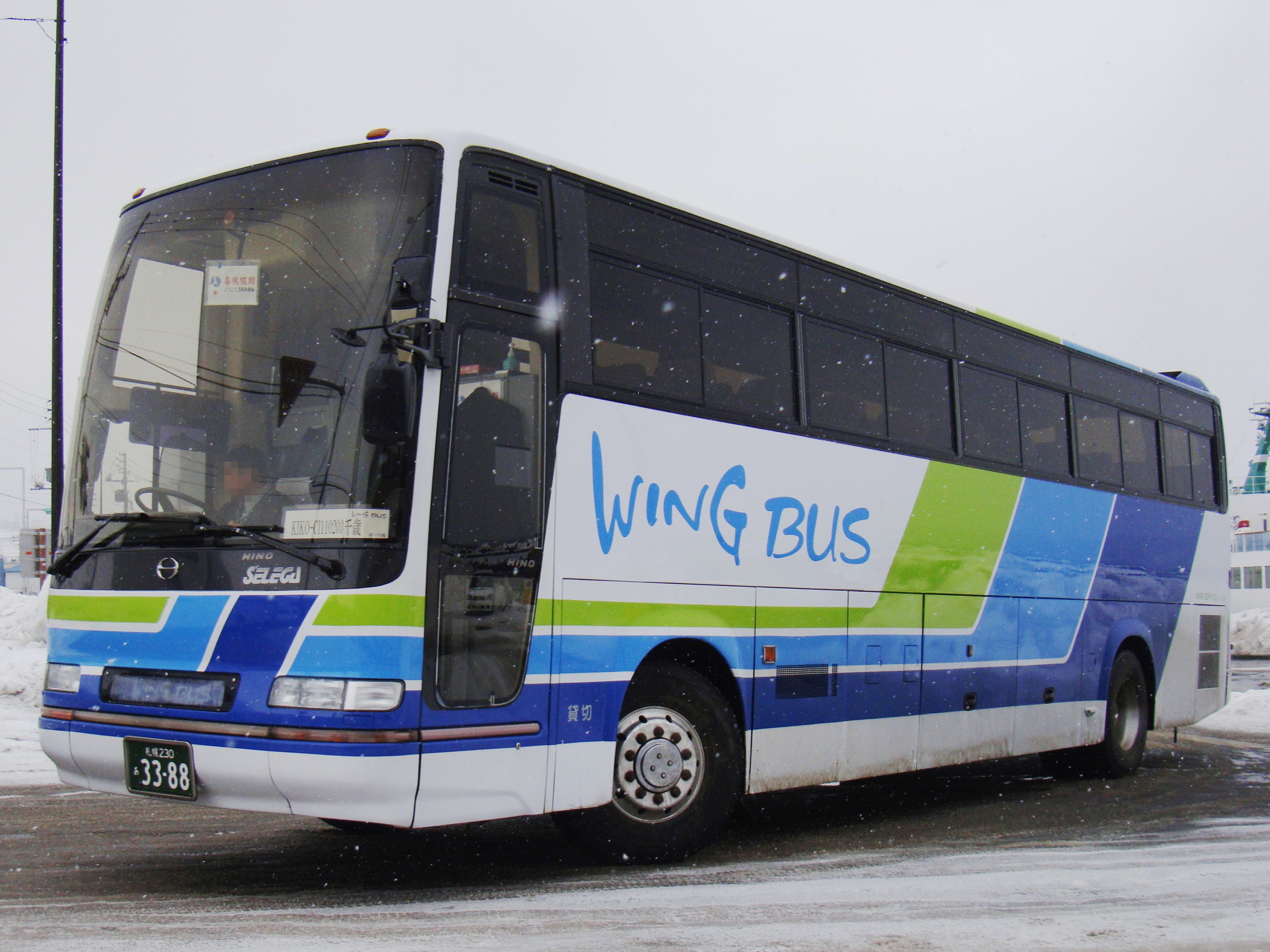
S'elega GD (U-RU3FTAB)

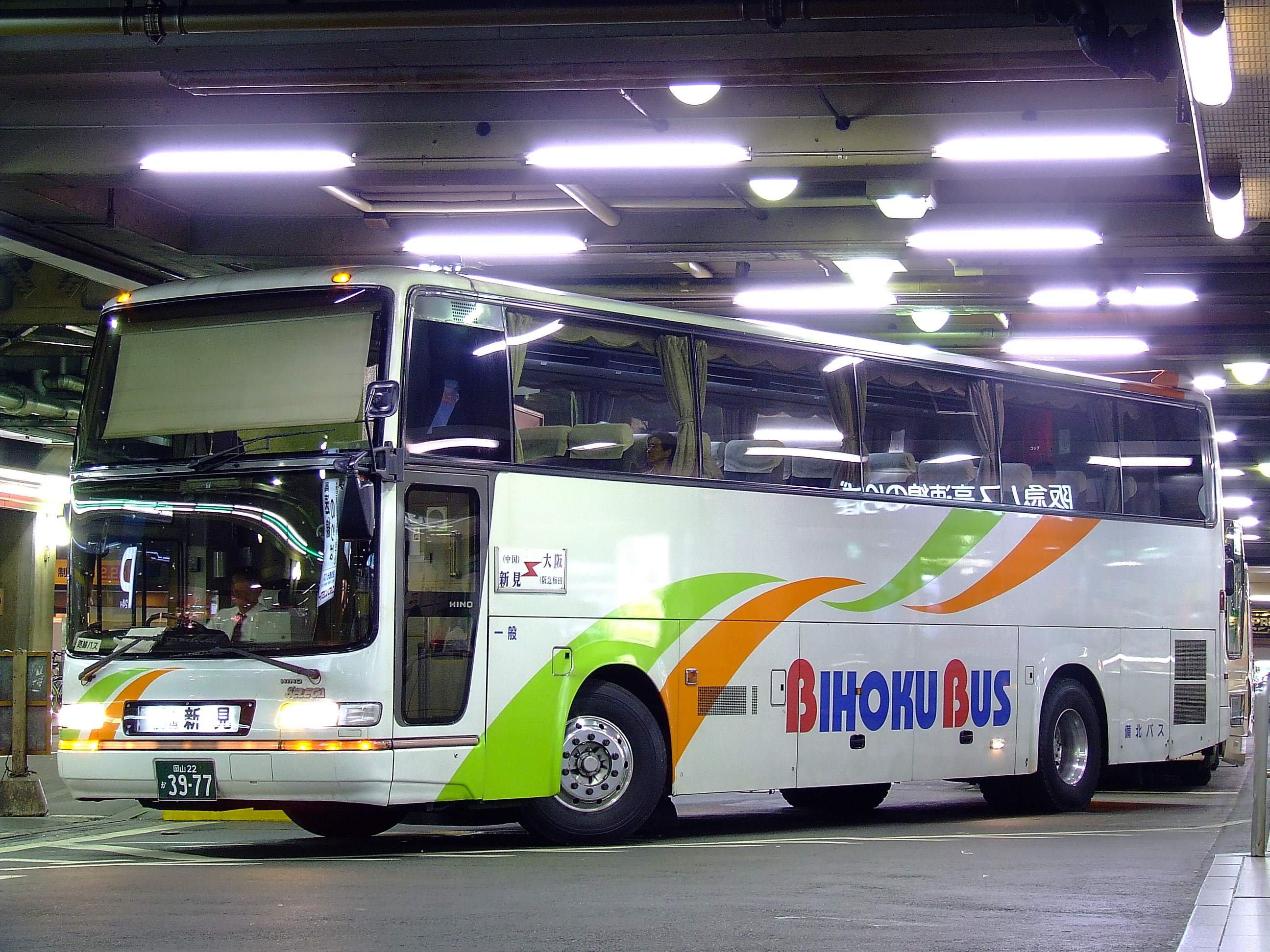
S'elega GJ (KC-RU4FSCB)

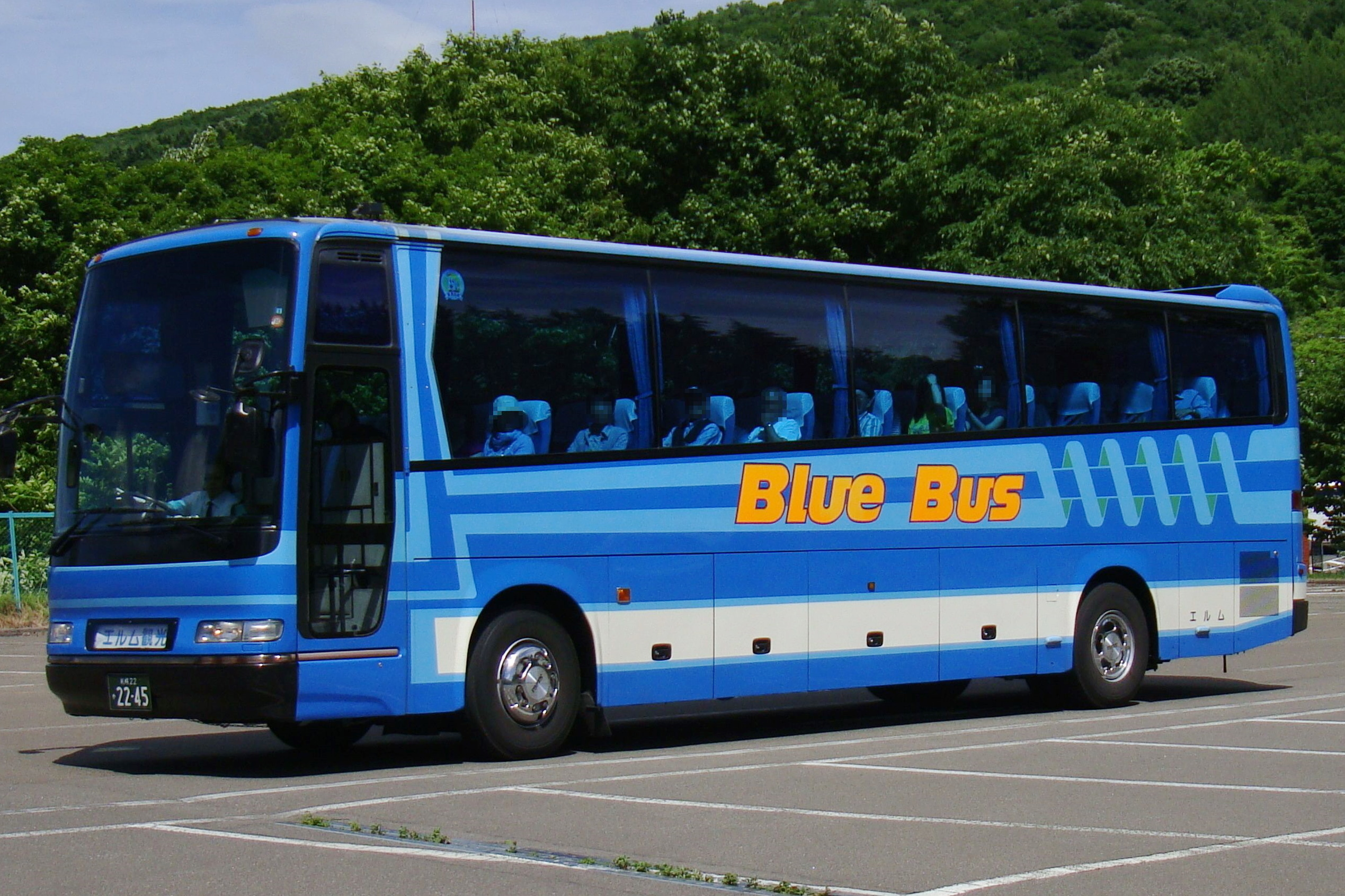
S'elega GT (U-RU2FTAB)

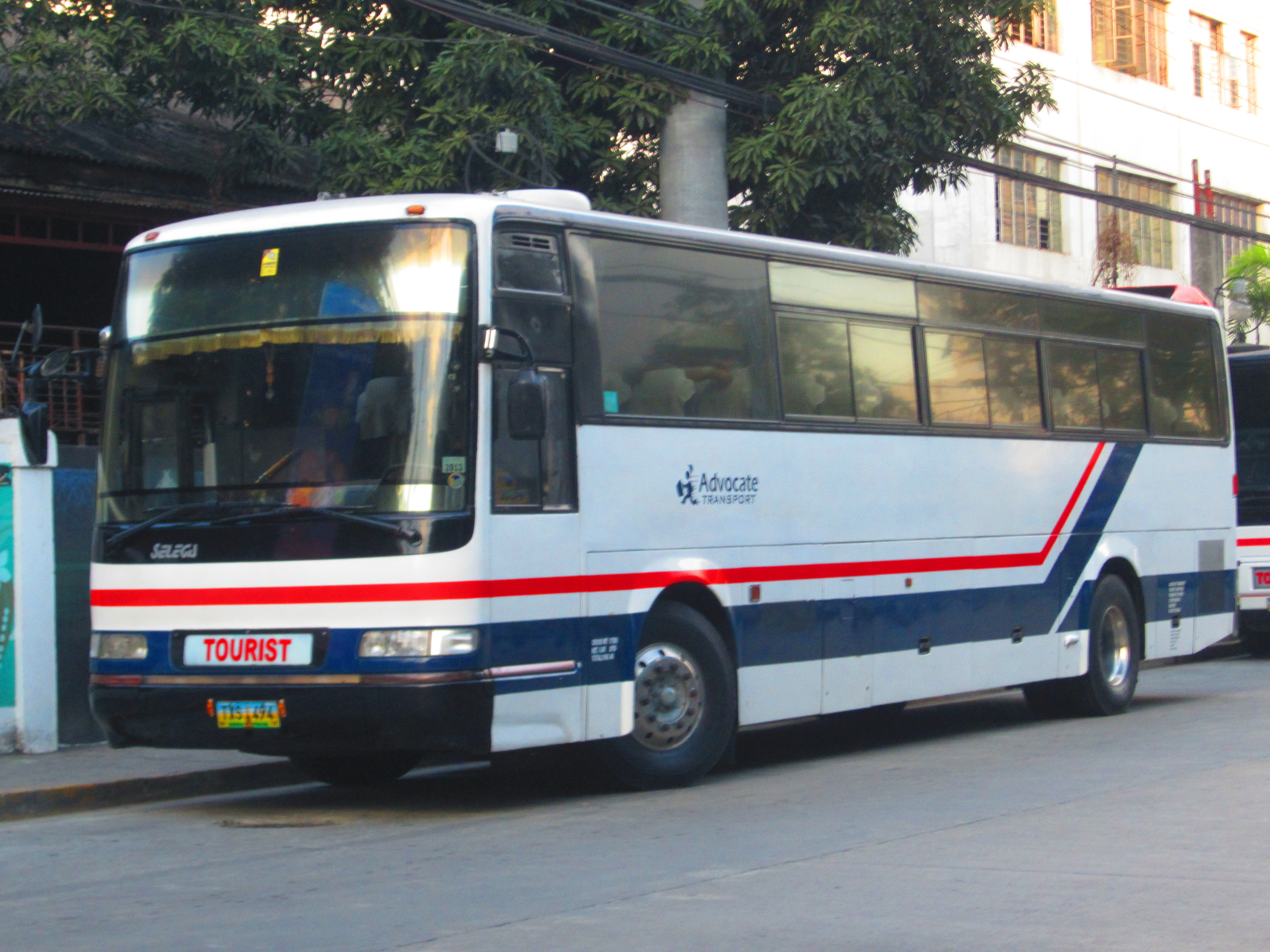
1st Gen. Hino S'elega (The Philippines)

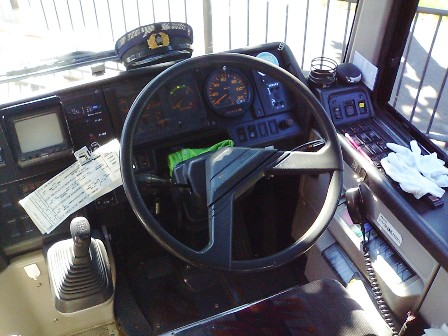
Hino S'elega cookpit

=== S'elega R (2000–2005) ===
- KL-RU1/4 (2000)
  - Magnetic retarder equipped (GD/GJ)
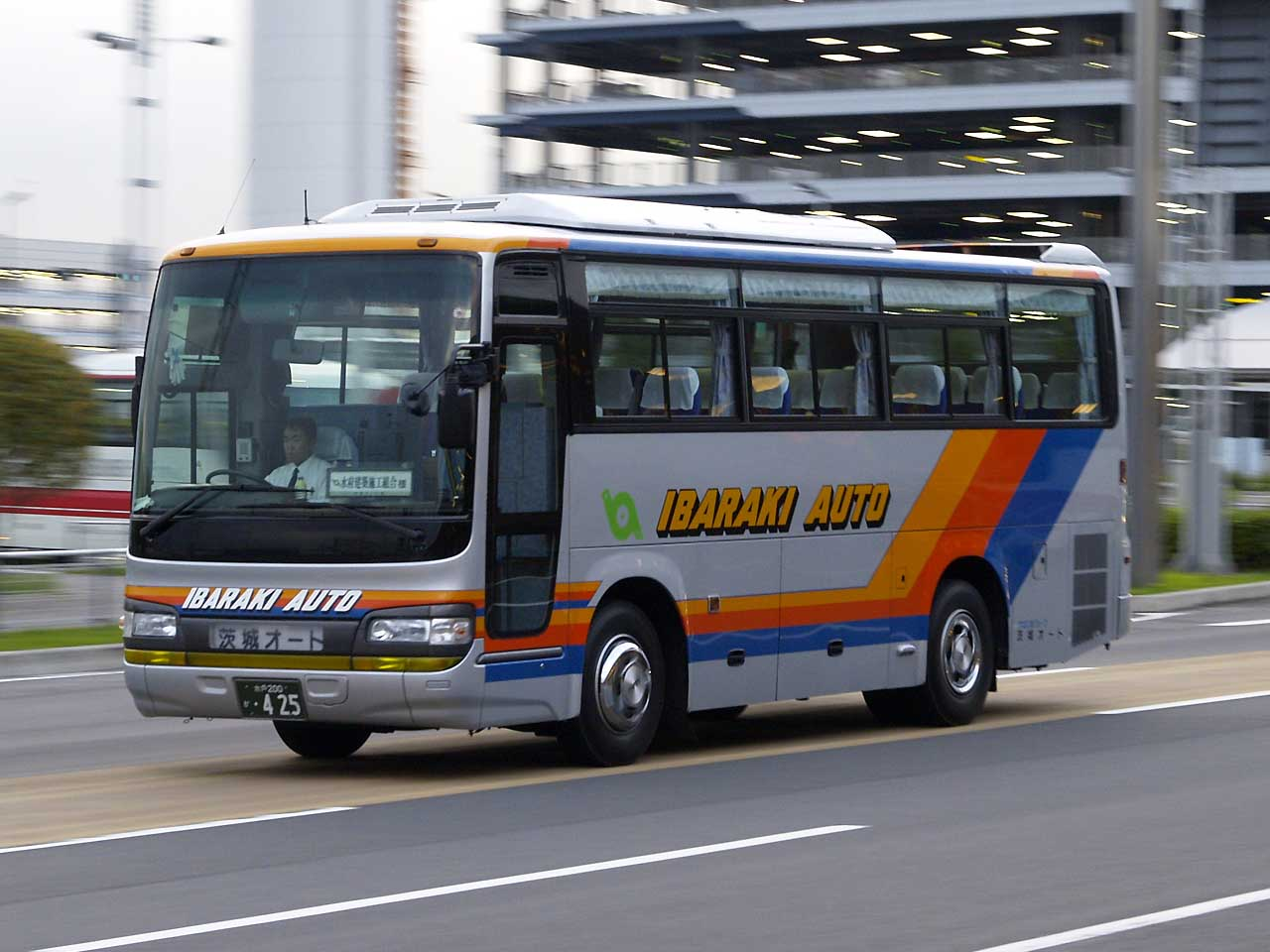
S'elega R FC (KL-RU1JHEA)

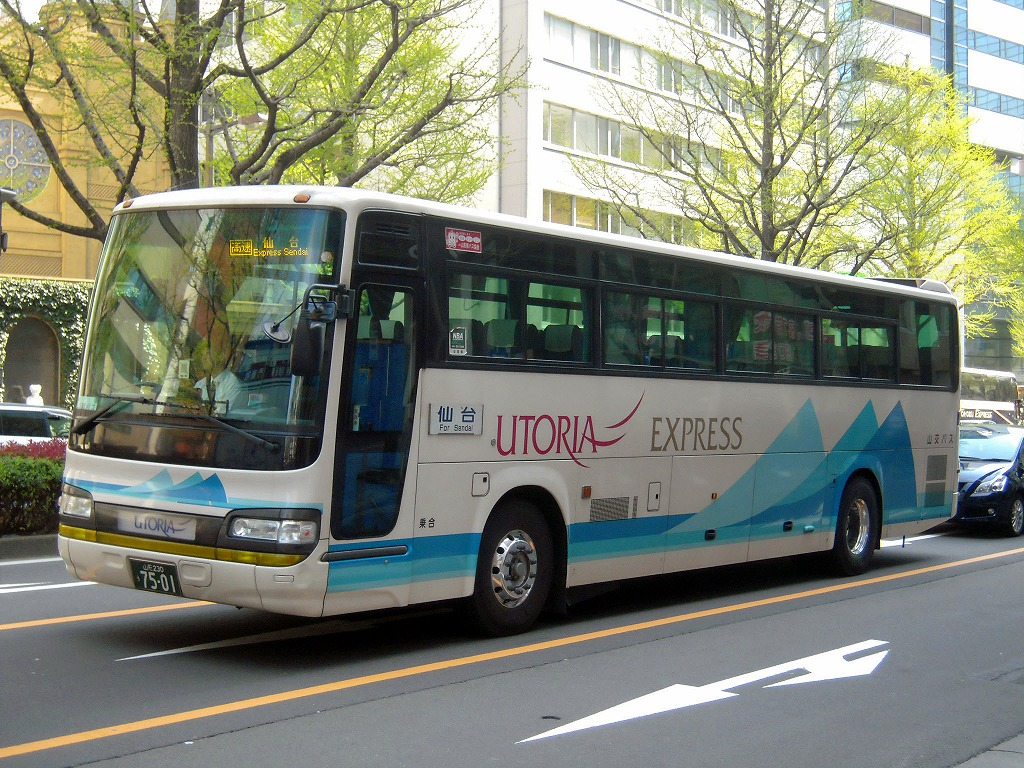
S'elega R FD (KL-RU4FSEA)

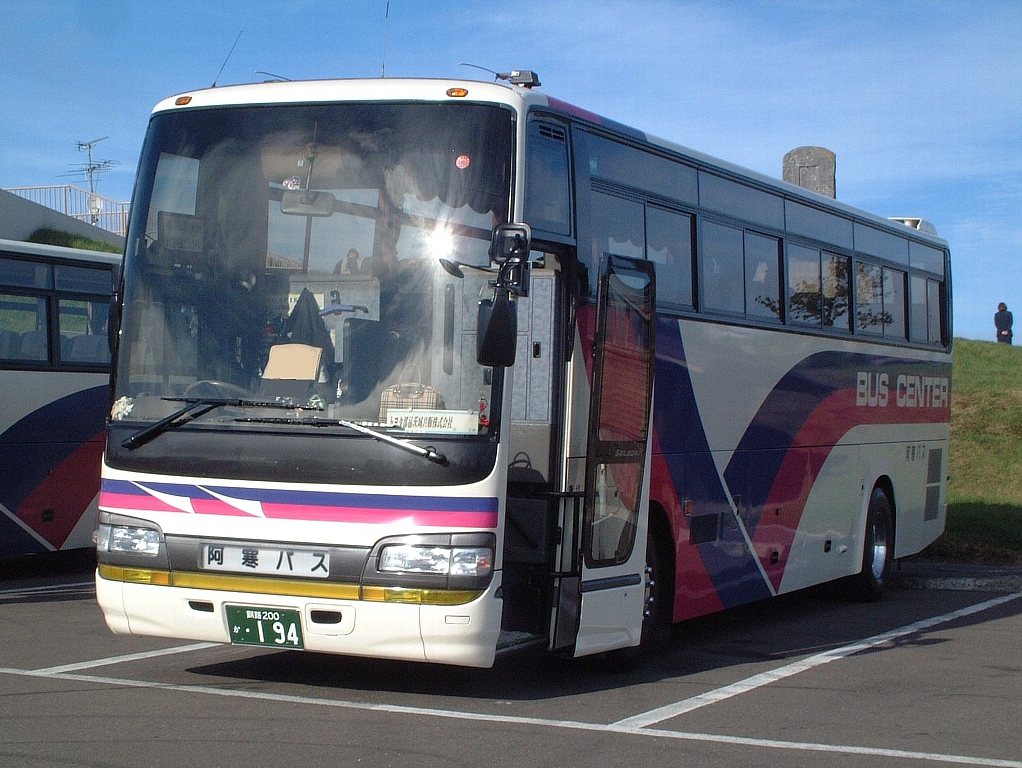
S'elega R GD (KL-RU1FSEA)

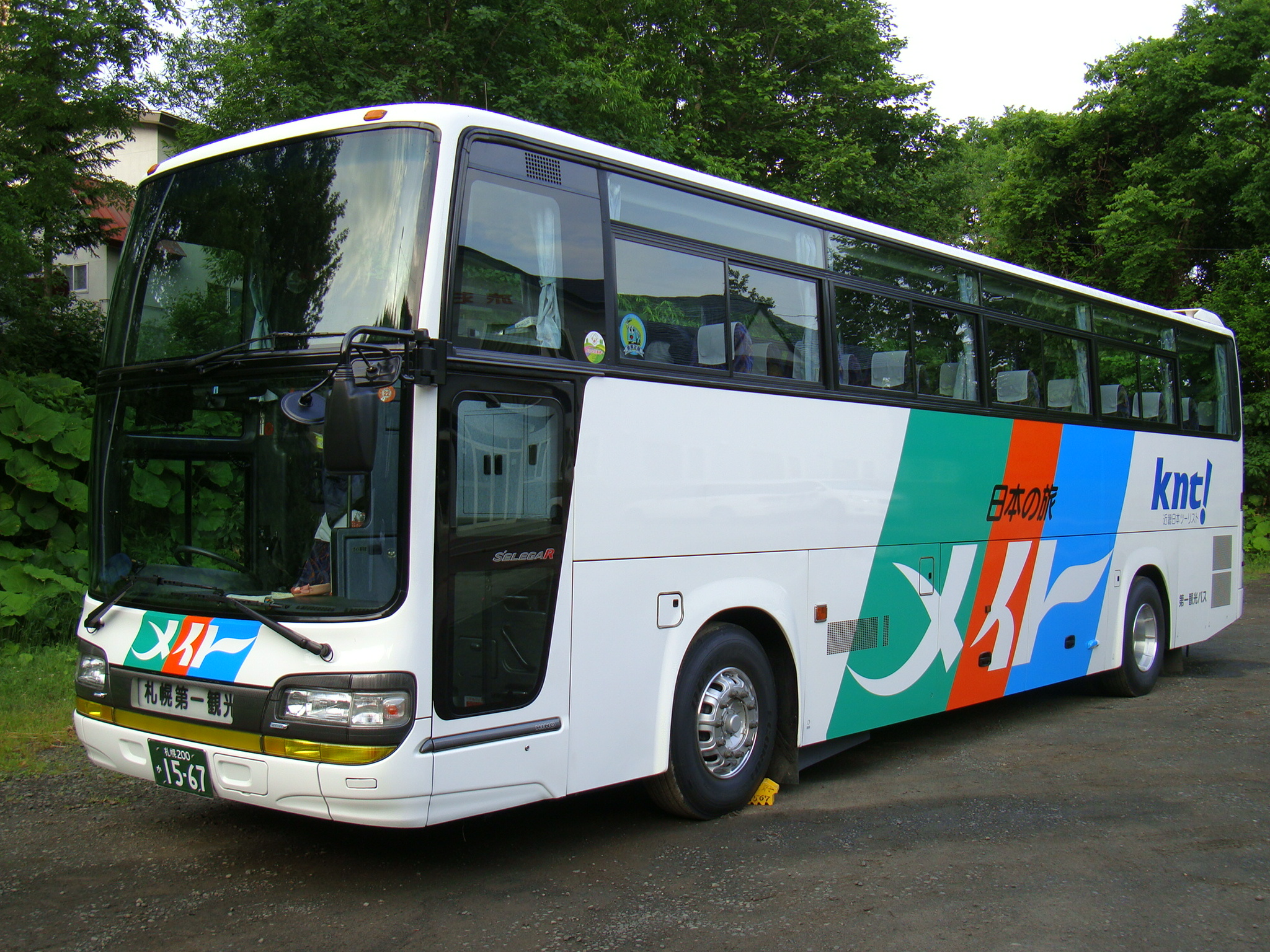
S'elega R (GJ KL-RU1FSEA)

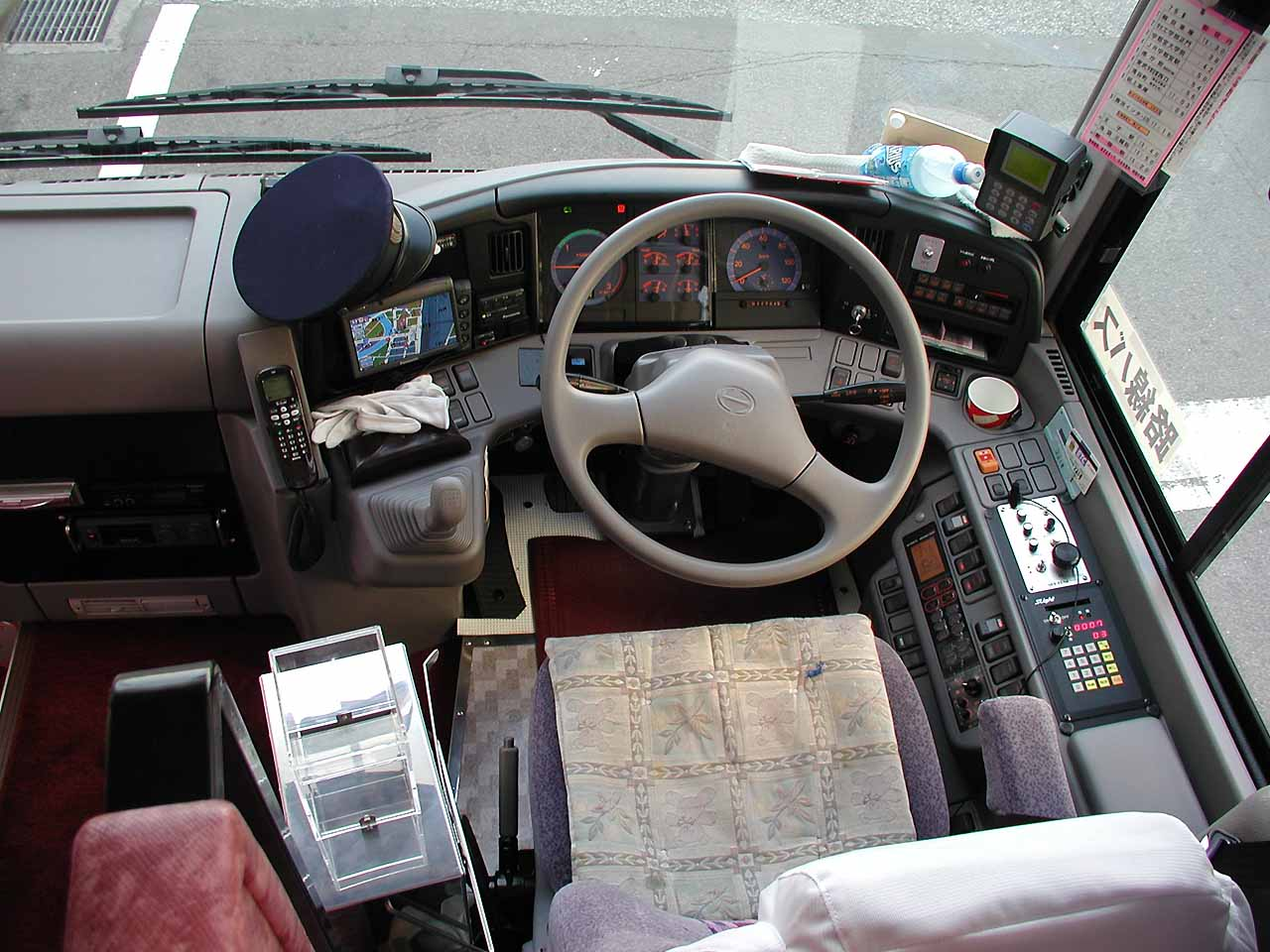
S'elega R cookpit

==== S'elega R Hybrid (2004–2006) ====
- VM-RU2PPFR (2004)
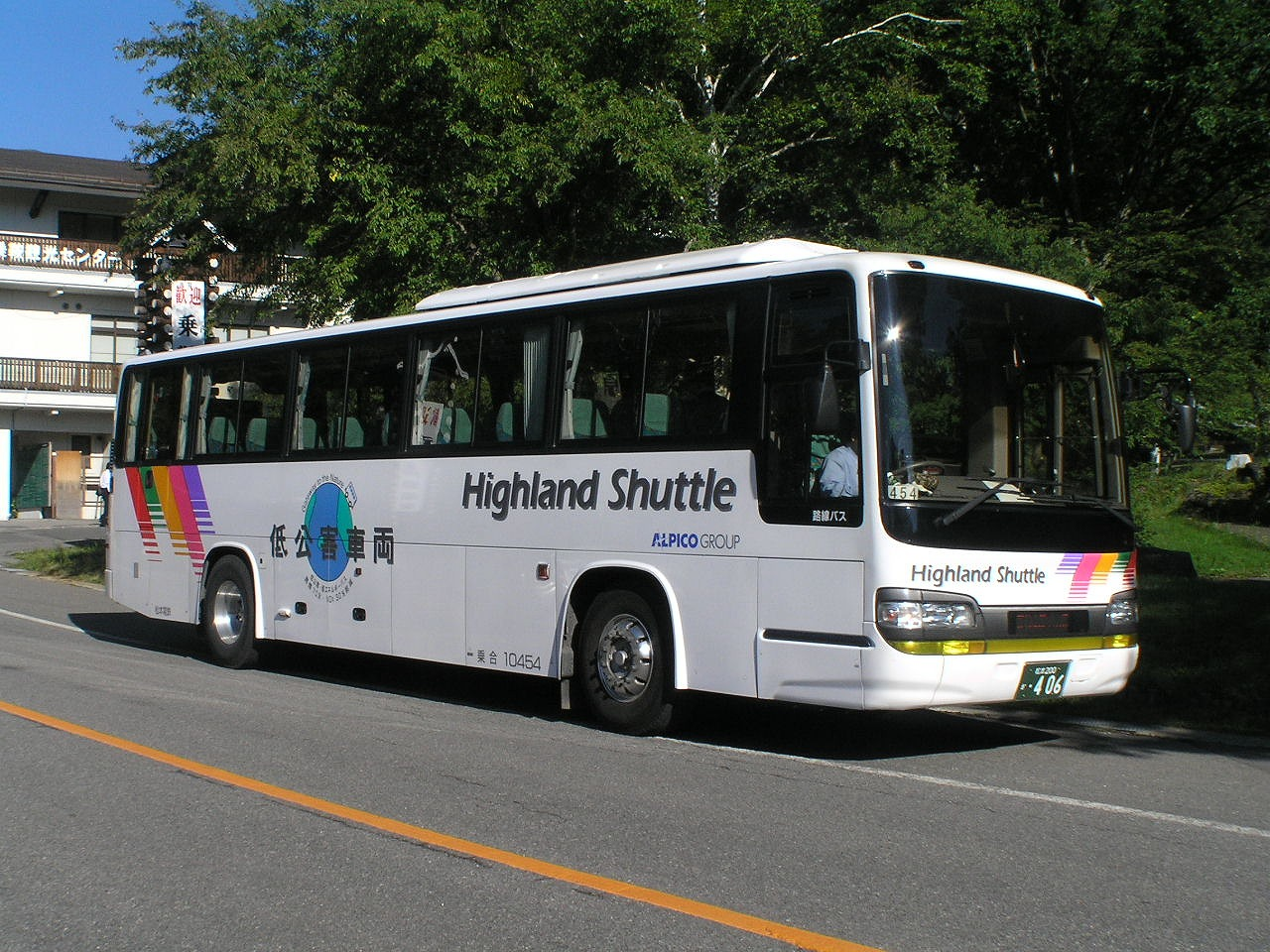
S'elega R Hybrid (VM-RU2PPFR)

=== Engine ===
Standard model: V-8 OHV Diesel

- F17E - Max output: 340 metric horsepower (250 kW)
- F20C - Max output: 400 metric horsepower (294 kW) (U-RU) or 355 horsepower (265 kW)(KC-RU)
- F21C - Max output: 400 metric horsepower (294 kW) or 360 horsepower (268 kW)
- F17D (Turbocharged) - Max output: 450 metric horsepower (331 kW) (for S'elega R KL-RU1FSEA)

Hybrid model: turbocharged straight-6 OHV Diesel

- P11C - Max output: 310 metric horsepower (228 kW)

=== Model line up ===
- GD 12 m (39 ft)
- GJ 12 m
- GT 12 m
- FD 11.5 m (38 ft)/12 m
- FS 12 m
- FM 11 m (36 ft)/11.5 m
- FC 9 m (30 ft)

== Second generation (2005) ==
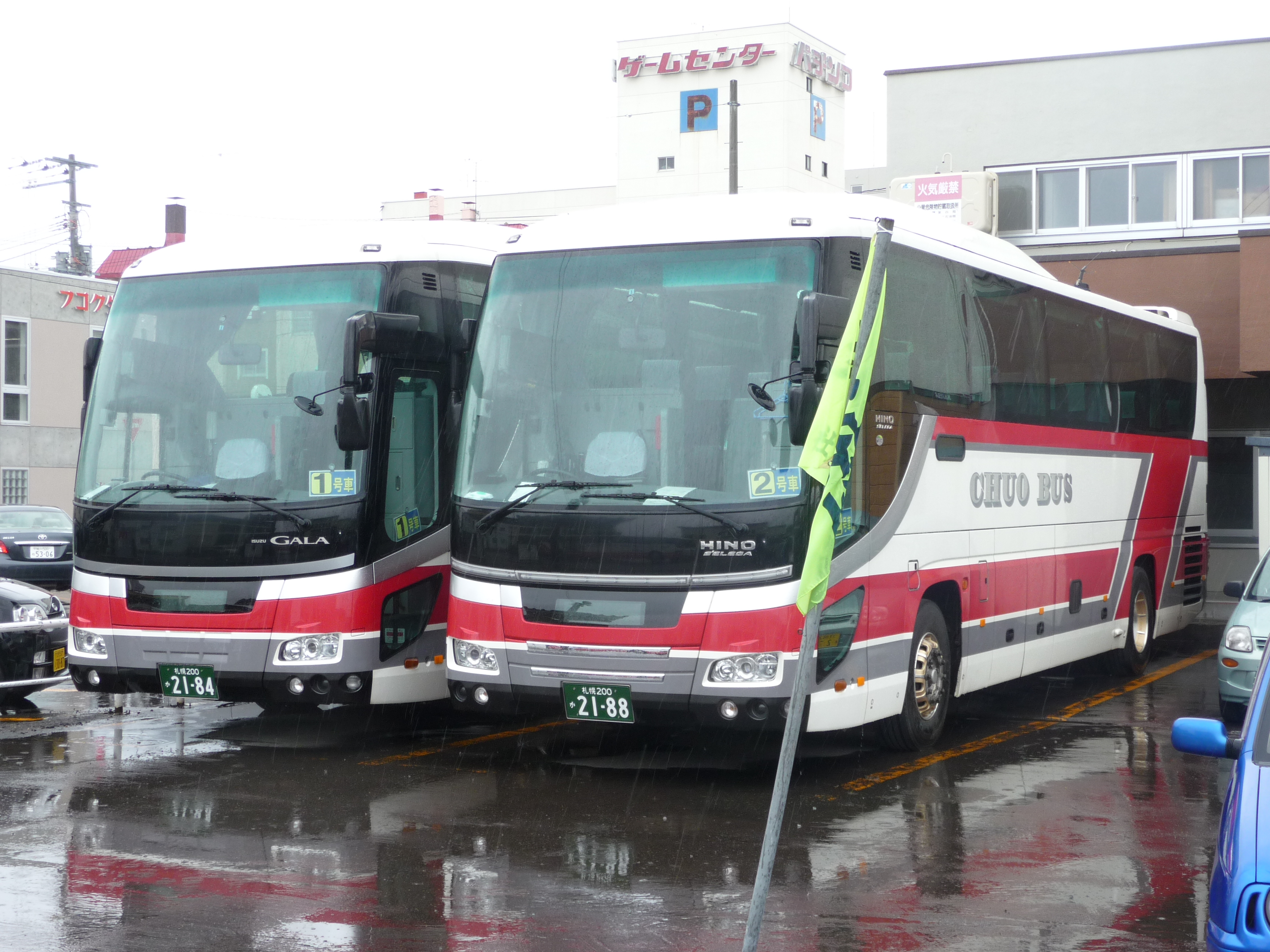
Hino S'elega (right), Isuzu Gala (left)

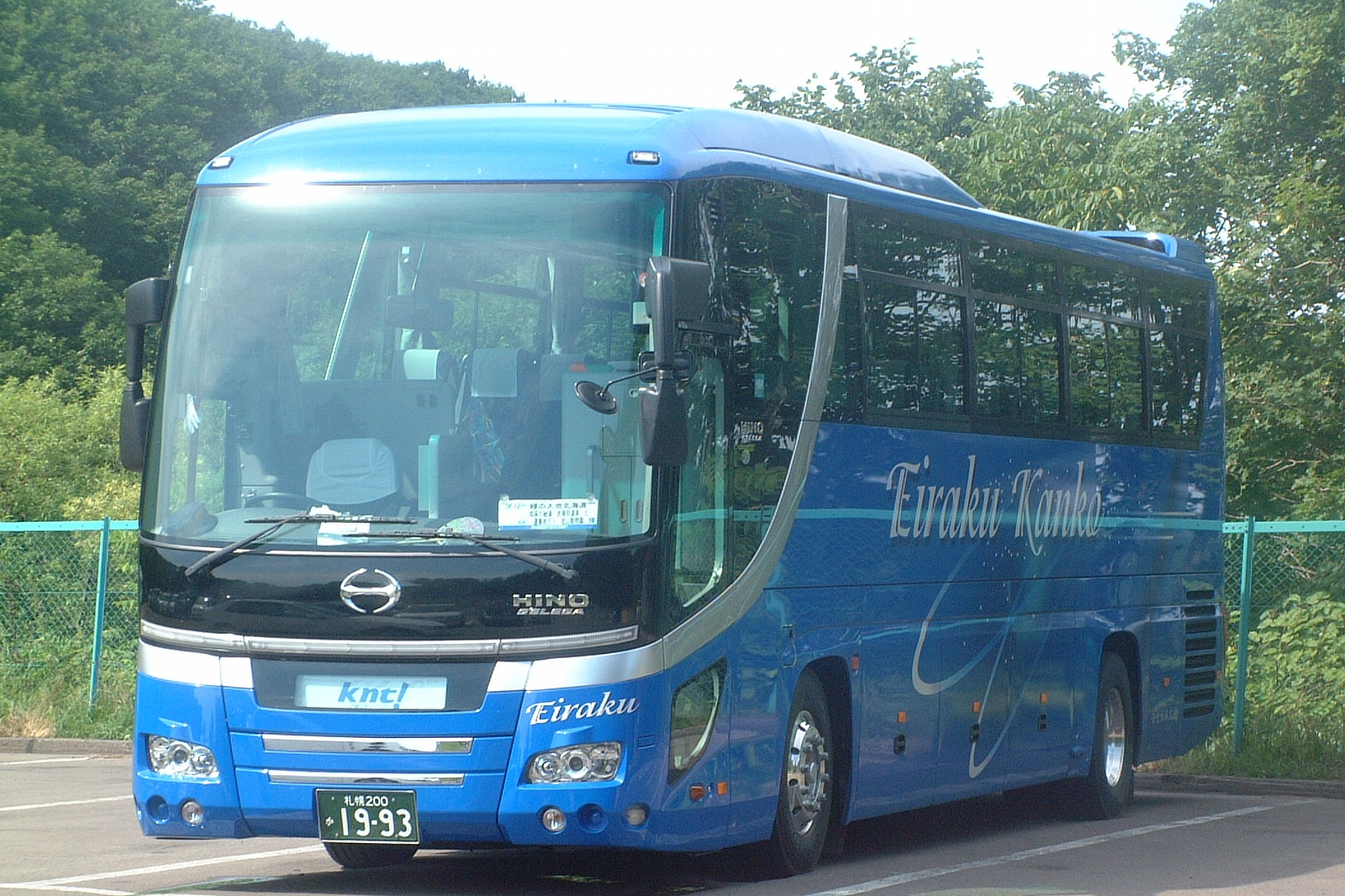
2007 Hino S'elega (RU1ESAA)

The Hino S'elega second generation is also sold as the Isuzu Gala.

- ADG-RU1E/8J (2005)
- PKG-RU1E/BDG-RU8J (2006)
- BJG-RU1ASAR (2008: Hybrid model)

=== Engine ===
All models are turbocharged straight-6 OHC Diesel.

- E13C (12.9 Liter, Max output: 460 metric horsepower (338 kW) or 380 metric horsepower (279 kW), for RU1E: 12 m (39 ft) length model)
- J08E (7.7 Liter, Max output: 270 metric horsepower (199 kW), for RU8J: 9 m (30 ft) length model)
- A09C-1M (8.8 Liter, Max output: 350 metric horsepower (257 kW), for RU1A: hybrid model only)

=== Model line up ===
- SHD (Super High Decker) 12 m
- HD (High Decker) 12 m
- HD-S (High Decker Short) 9 m

The Super High Decker has 10.2 cubic meter and the High Decker has 8.6 cubic meter of trunk space.

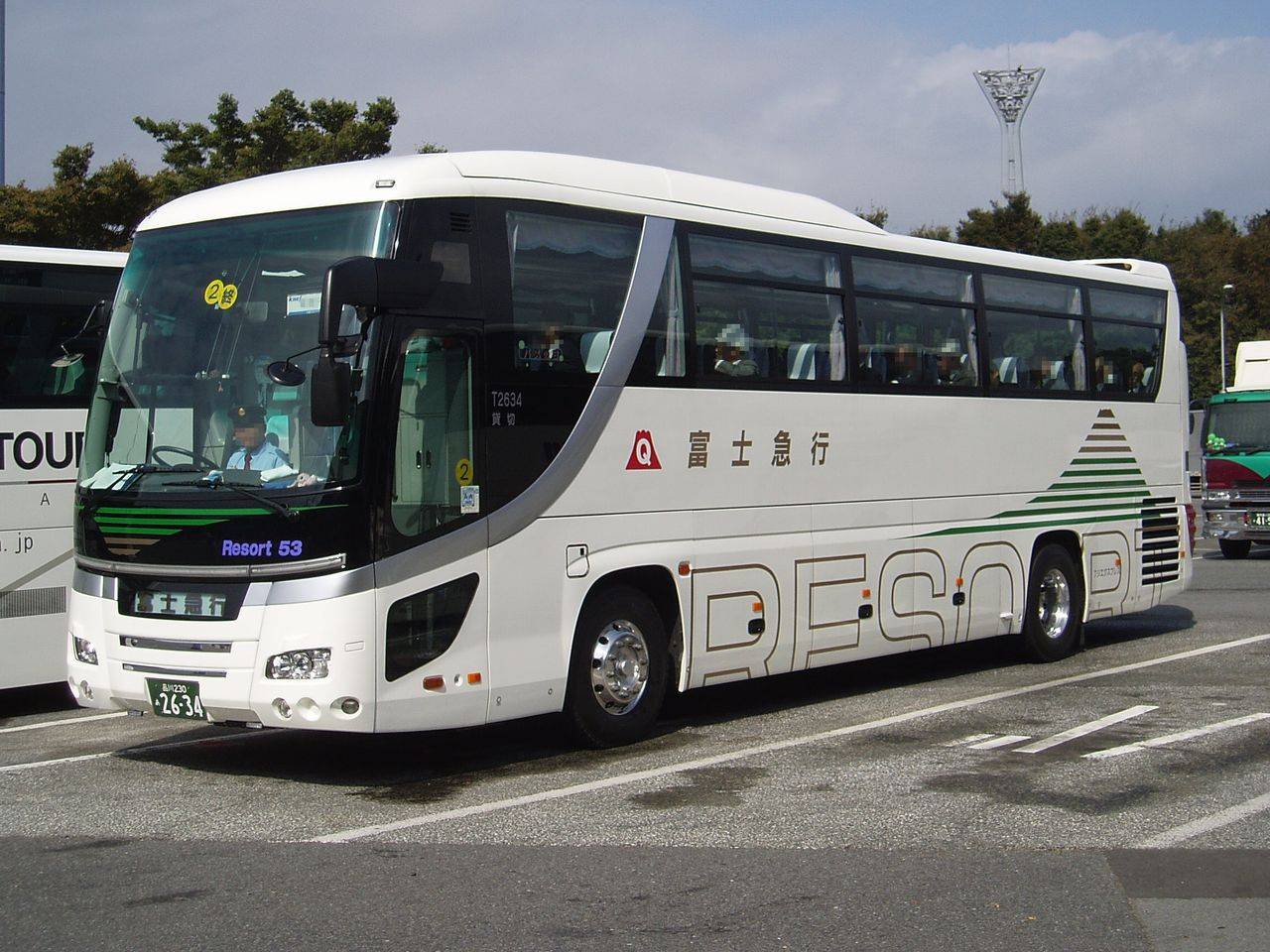
S'elega Super High Decker (ADG-RU1ESAA)

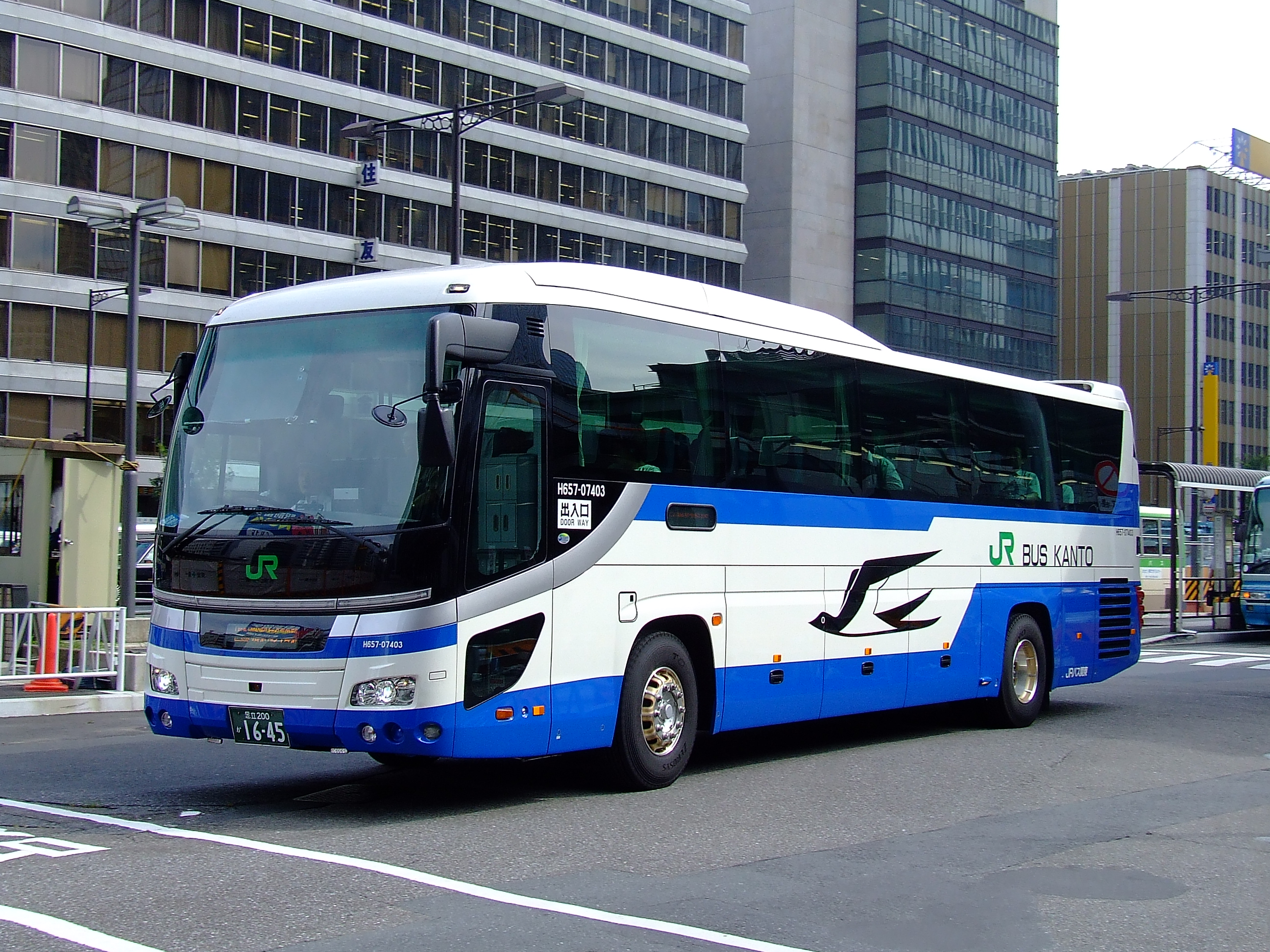
S'elega High Decker (PKG-RU1ESAA)

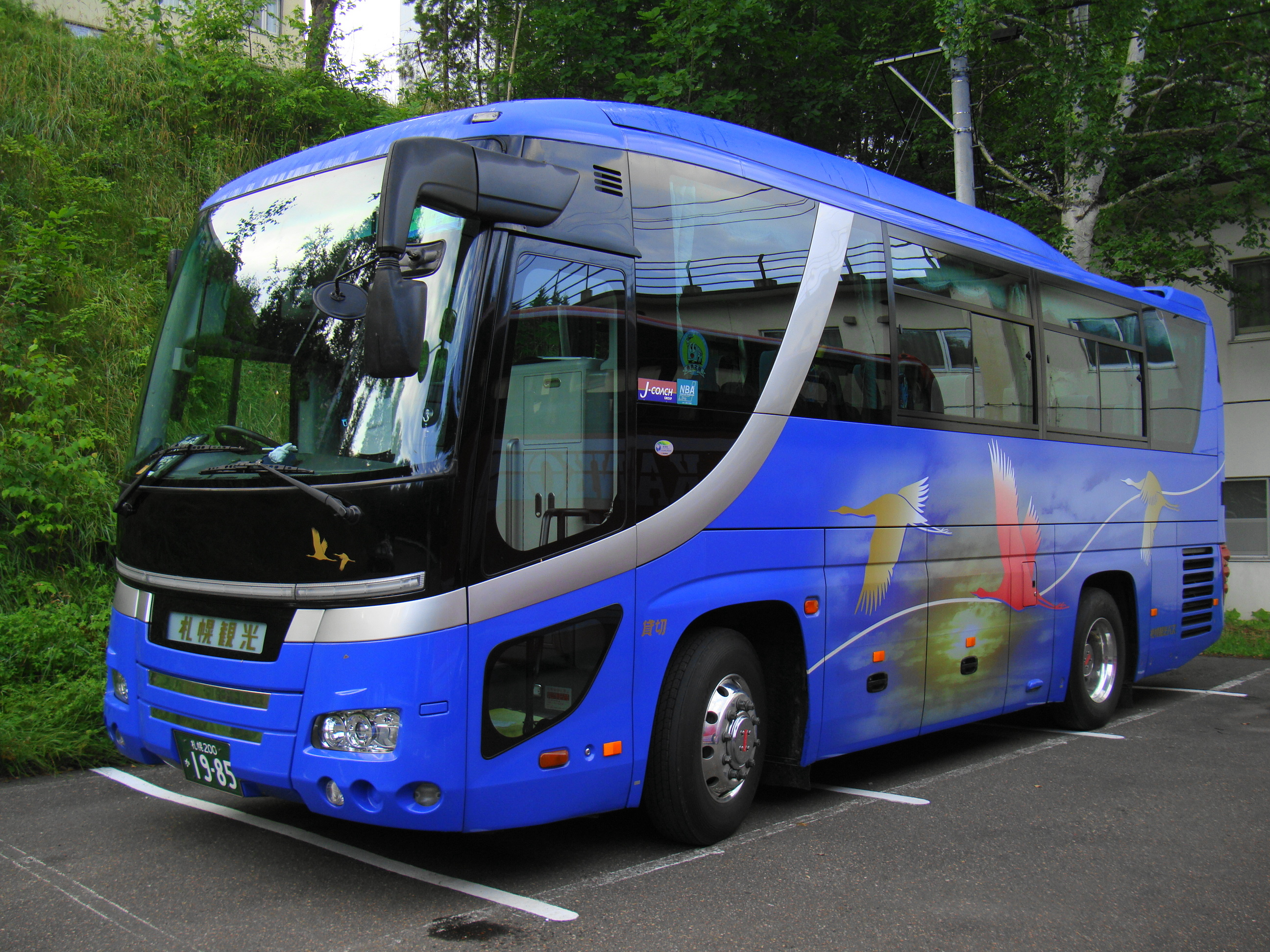
S'elega High Decker Short (BDG-RU8JHAA)

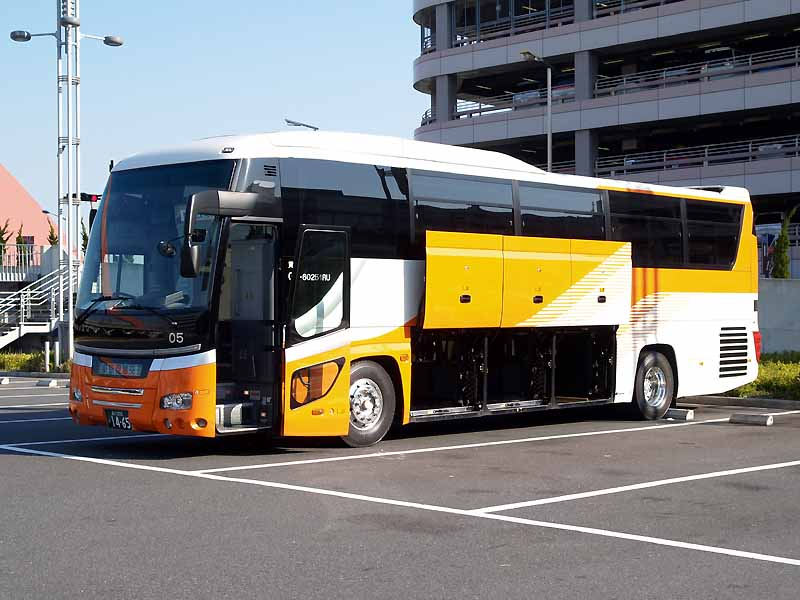
New S'elega equipped with roof-mounted condenser of air-conditioning system; under-floor baggage compartment has a capacity of (HD: 8.6 m^{3} (300 ft^{3}) or 10.2 m^{3} (360 ft^{3}) (SHD)

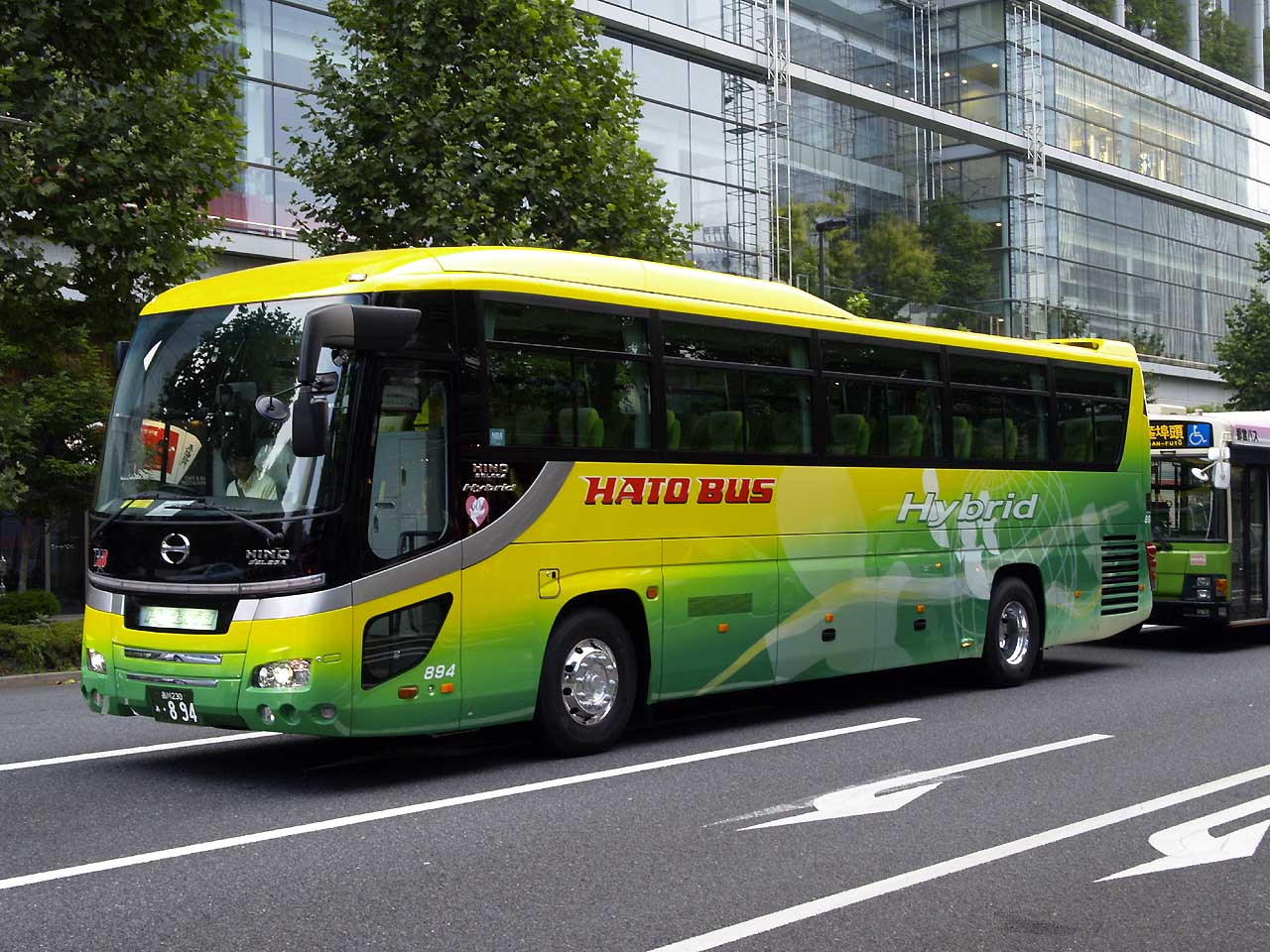
S'elega High Decker Hybrid (BDG-RU1ASAR)

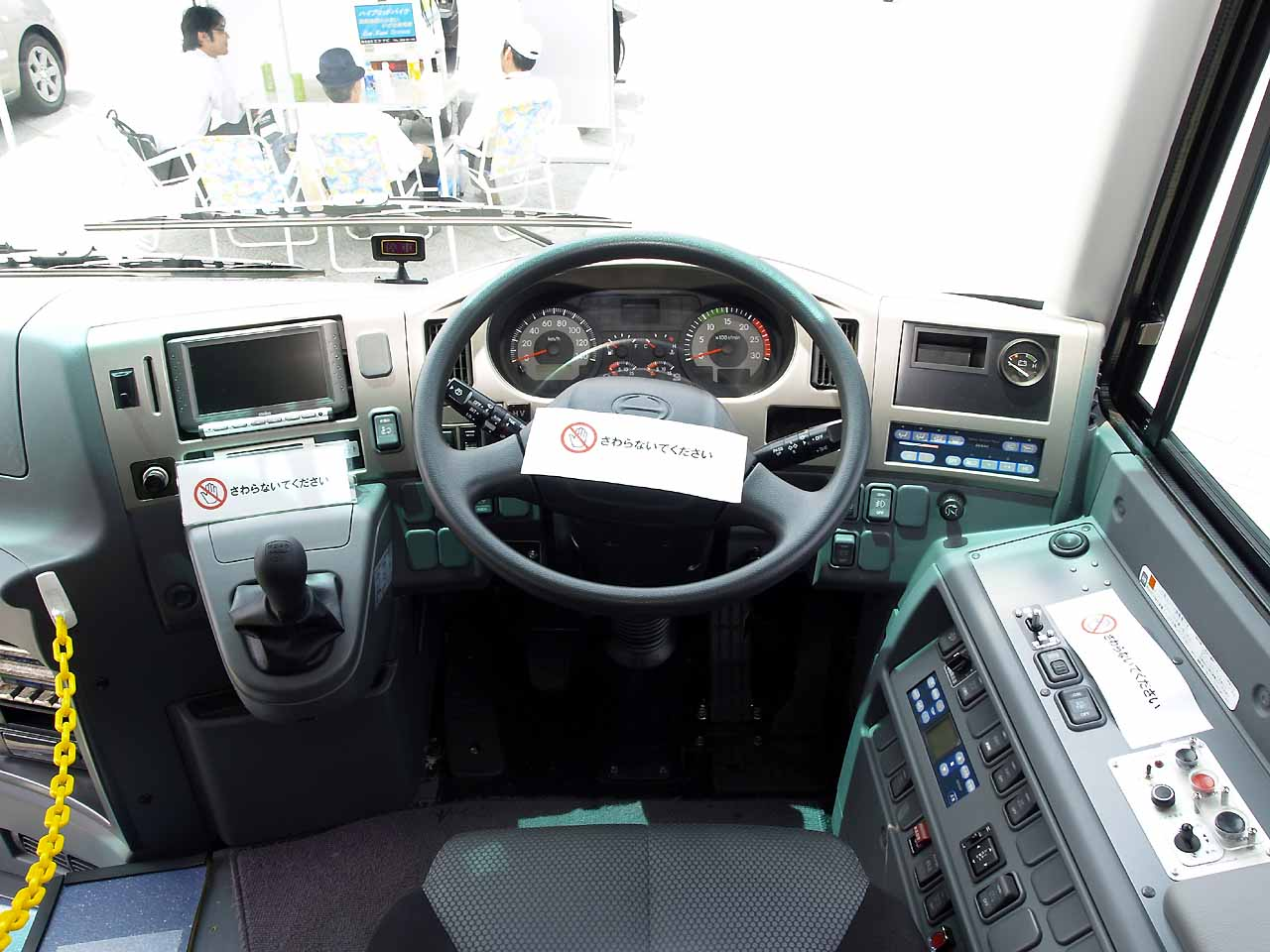
Cockpit

== Third generation (2025) ==
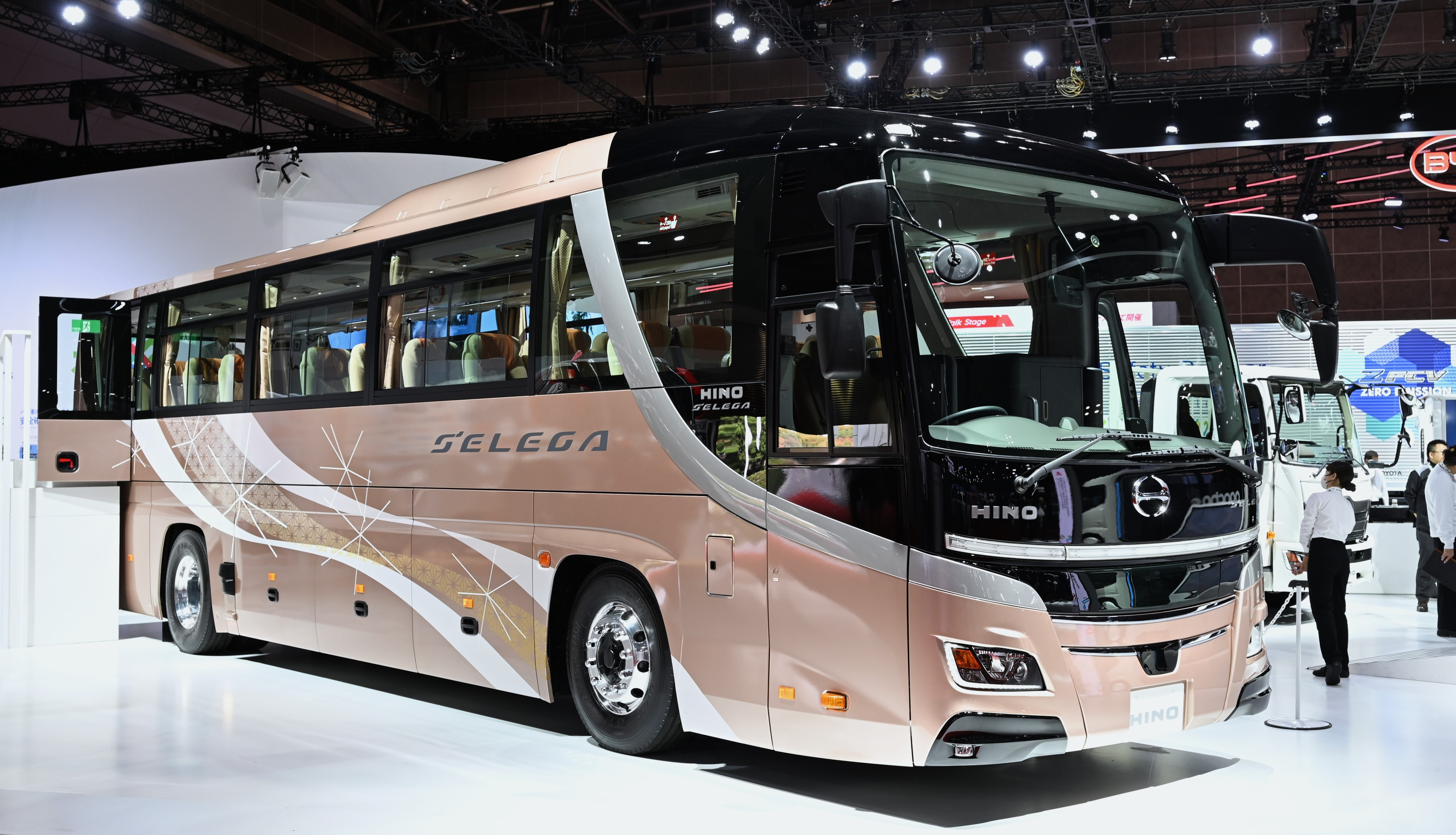
Third-generation S'elega at the 2025 Japan Mobility Show

The third-generation S'elega was introduced in November 2025 at the 2025 Japan Mobility Show, and to be available for sale in the Spring 2026. The new exterior design focuses on "functional beauty" and provides better aerodynamic to enhance fuel efficiency.

- RU1ASDY (2025)

=== Engine ===
All models are turbocharged straight-6 OHC Diesel.

- A09C (8.8 Liter, Max output: 360 metric horsepower (265 kW), for RU1A)
