= Hakoishi Station =

Railway station in Miyako, Iwate Prefecture, Japan

Hakoishi Station 箱石駅
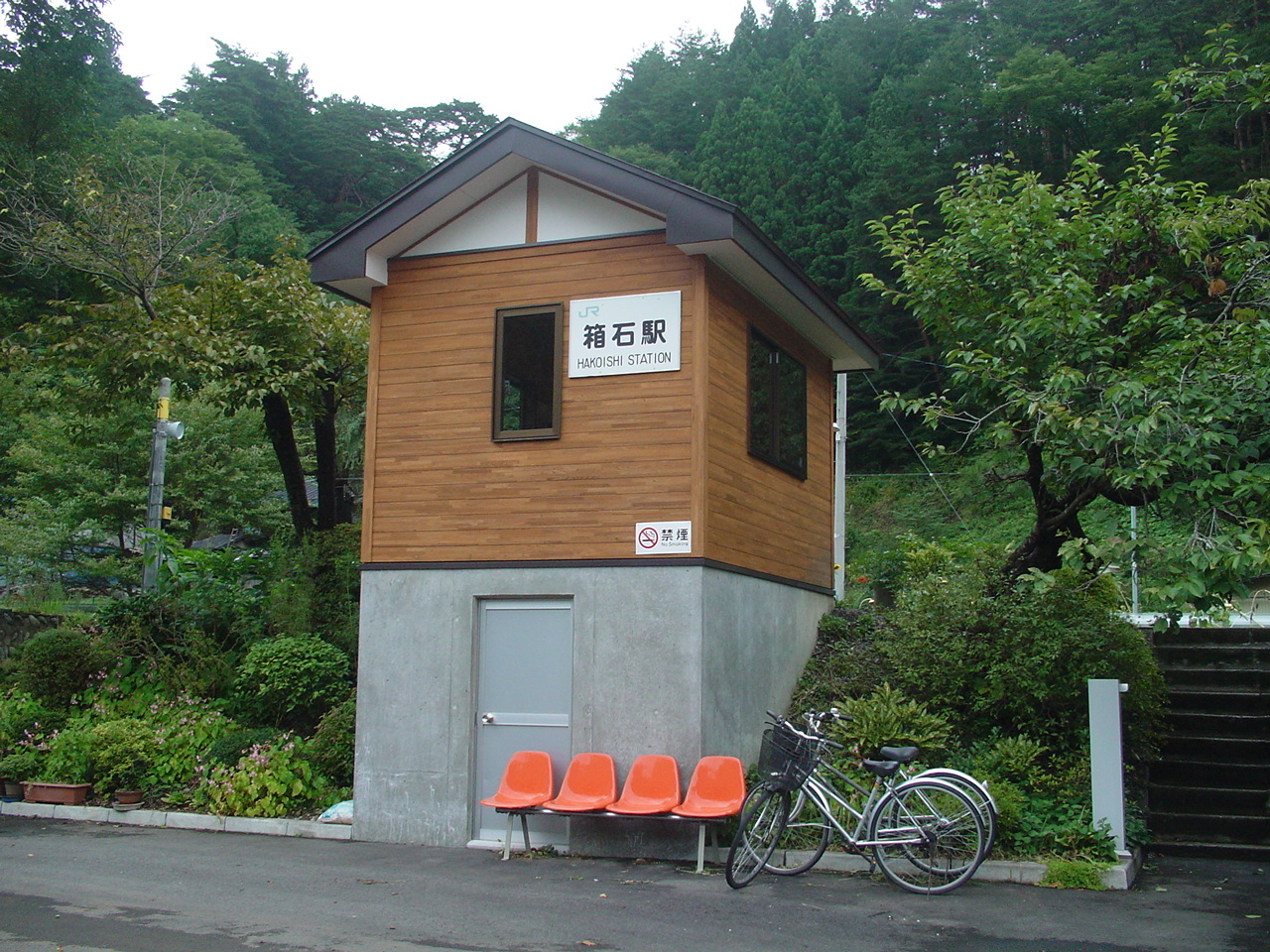
- Hakoishi Station, September 2007

General information
- Location: Hirakawanai Dai-6 jiwari 48-3 Hakoishi, Miyako-shi, Iwate-ken 028-2304; Japan
- Coordinates: 39.6173°N 141.6258°E
- Operator: JR East
- Line: ■ Yamada Line
- Distance: 65.7 km from Morioka
- Platforms: 1 side platform
- Tracks: 1

Construction
- Structure type: At grade

Other information
- Status: Unstaffed
- Website: Official website

History
- Opened: 30 November 1933

Services
Preceding station	JR East	Following station
Kawauchi towards Morioka	Yamada Line Local	Rikuchū-Kawai towards Miyako
Location
- Location within Japan

Hakoishi Station (箱石駅, Hakoishi-eki) is a railway station on the Yamada Line in the city of Miyako, Iwate, Japan, operated by East Japan Railway Company (JR East).

== Lines ==
Hakoishi Station is served by the Yamada Line, and is located 65.7 rail kilometers from the terminus of the line at Morioka Station.

== Station layout ==
Hakoishi Station has a single side platform serving a single bi-directional track. The station is unattended.

== History ==
Hakoishi Station opened on 30 November 1933. The station was closed from 26 November 1946 to 21 November 1954. The station was absorbed into the JR East network upon the privatization of the Japanese National Railways (JNR) on 1 April 1987.

== Surrounding area ==
- Japan National Route 106

== See also ==
- List of railway stations in Japan
