= Kawauchi Station (Iwate) =

Railway station in Miyako, Iwate Prefecture, Japan

Kawauchi Station 川内駅
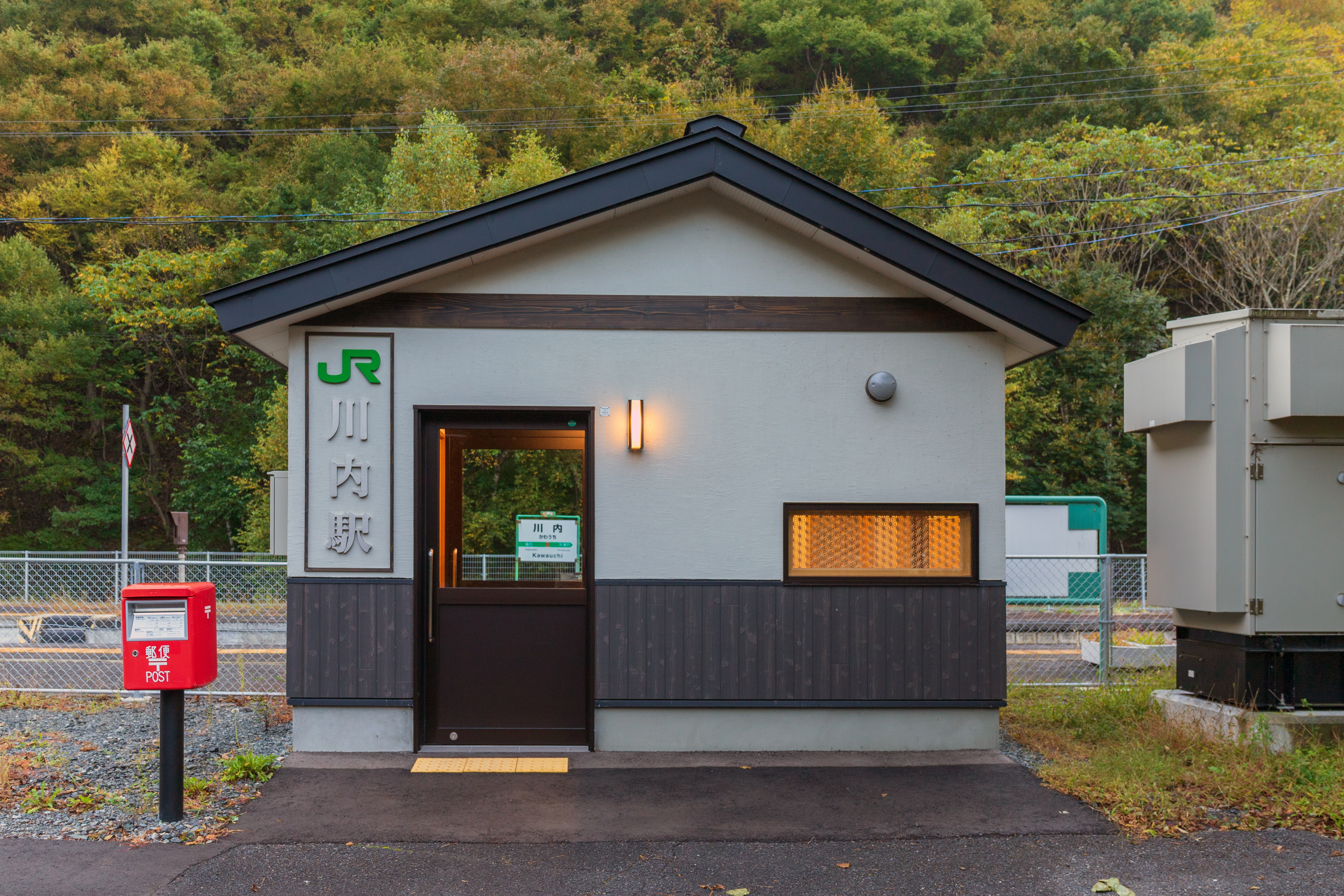
- Kawauchi Station.

General information
- Location: 48-3 Kawauchi dai-roku jiwari, Miyako-shi, Iwate-ken 028-2513; Japan
- Coordinates: 39.6409°N 141.5976°E
- Operator: JR East
- Line: ■ Yamada Line
- Distance: 61.5 km from Morioka
- Platforms: 1 side + 1 island platform
- Tracks: 3

Construction
- Structure type: At grade

Other information
- Status: Unstaffed
- Website: Official website

History
- Opened: 30 November 1933

Passengers
- FY2015: 13

Services
Preceding station	JR East	Following station
Hiratsuto towards Morioka	Yamada Line Local	Hakoishi towards Miyako
Location
- Location within Japan

Kawauchi Station (川内駅, Kawauchi-eki) is a railway station on the Yamada Line in the city of Miyako, Iwate, Japan, operated by East Japan Railway Company (JR East).

== Lines ==
Kawauchi Station is served by the Yamada Line, and is located 61.5 kilometers from the starting point of the line at Morioka Station.

== Station layout ==
Kawauchi Station has a single side platform and an island platform serving three tracks, connected to the station building by a level crossing. The station is unattended.

=== Platforms ===
1	■ Yamada Line	for Moichi and Miyako
2	■ Yamada Line	for Kuzakai and Morioka
3	■ Yamada Line	passing loop

== History ==
Kawauchi Station opened on 30 November 1933. The station was closed from 26 November 1946 to 21 November 1954. The station was absorbed into the JR East network upon the privatization of the Japanese National Railways (JNR) on 1 April 1987. Because of changes on signalling block system, the use of the third track was stopped on 25 March 2018. Then the station became unstaffed on 22 April 2018.

== Passenger statistics ==
In fiscal 2015, the station was used by an average of 53 passengers daily (boarding passengers only).

== Surrounding area ==
- Japan National Route 106

== See also ==
- List of railway stations in Japan
- Kawauchi Station (Miyagi), a similarly named station on the Sendai Subway Tozai Line in Miyagi Prefecture
