= Hiratsuto Station =

Railway station in Miyako, Iwate Prefecture, Japan

Hiratsuto Station 平津戸駅
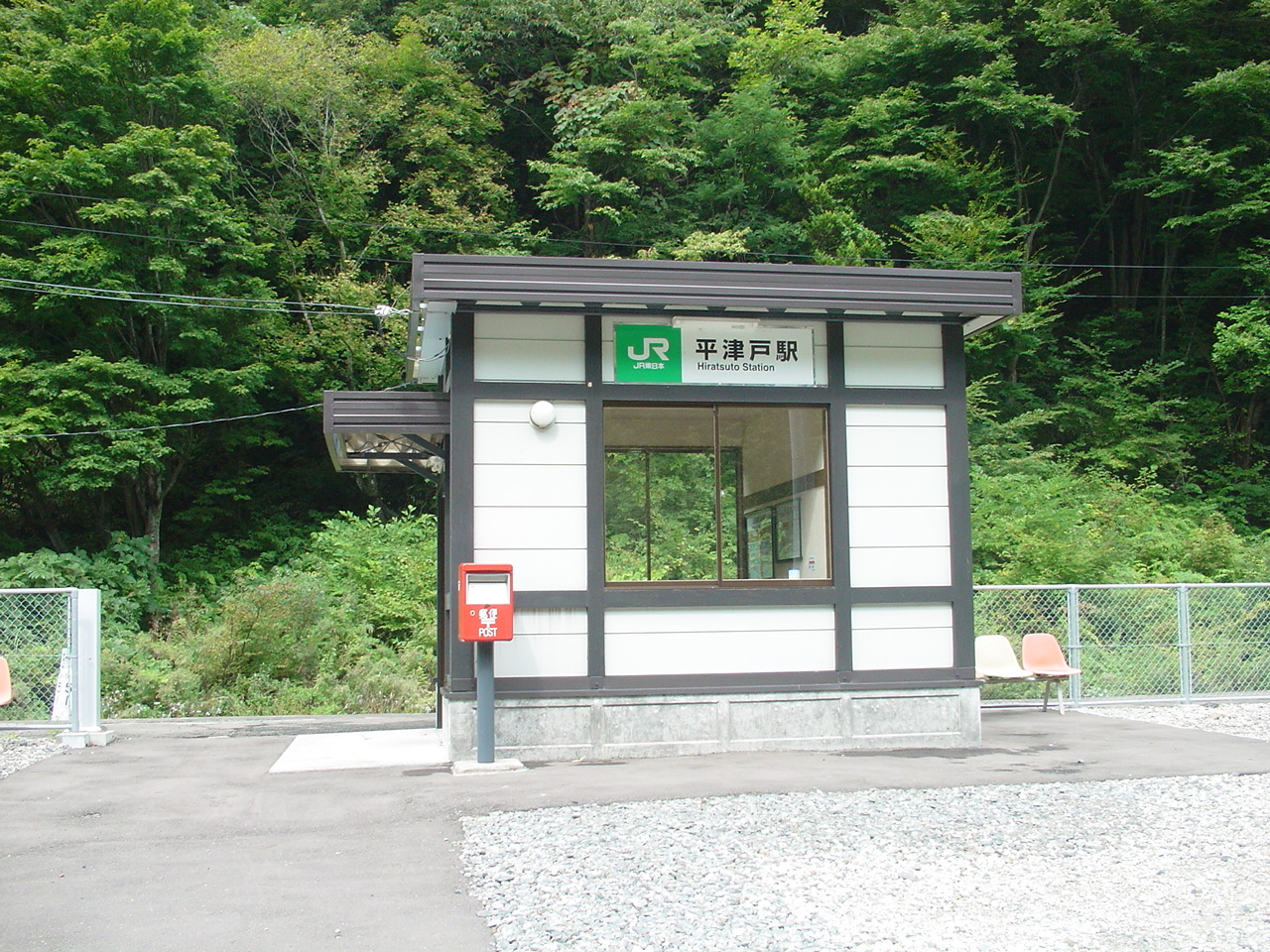
- Hiratsuto Station in September 2007

General information
- Location: Hiratsuto, Miyako-shi, Iwate-ken 028-2633; Japan
- Coordinates: 39.6235°N 141.5113°E
- Operator: JR East
- Line: ■ Yamada Line
- Distance: 52.2 km from Morioka
- Platforms: 1 side platform
- Tracks: 1

Construction
- Structure type: At grade

Other information
- Status: Unstaffed
- Website: Official website

History
- Opened: 31 October 1931
- Closed: 17 March 2023

Services
Preceding station	JR East	Following station
Matsukusa towards Morioka	Yamada Line Local	Kawauchi towards Miyako
Location
- Location within Japan

Hiratsuto Station (平津戸駅, Hiratsuto-eki) was a railway station on the Yamada Line in the city of Miyako, Iwate, Japan, operated by East Japan Railway Company (JR East).

== Lines ==
Hiratsuto Station was served by the Yamada Line, and was located 52.2 kilometers from the terminus of the line at Morioka Station.

== Station layout ==
Hiratsuto Station had a single side platform serving a single bi-directional line. The station was unattended.

== History ==
Hiratsuto Station opened on 31 October 1931. The station was absorbed into the JR East network upon the privatization of the Japanese National Railways (JNR) on 1 April 1987. It closed permanently on 17 March 2023, due to declining passenger numbers.

== Surrounding area ==
- National Route 106

== See also ==
- List of railway stations in Japan
