= Matsukusa Station =

Railway station in Miyako, Iwate Prefecture, Japan

Matsukusa Station 松草駅
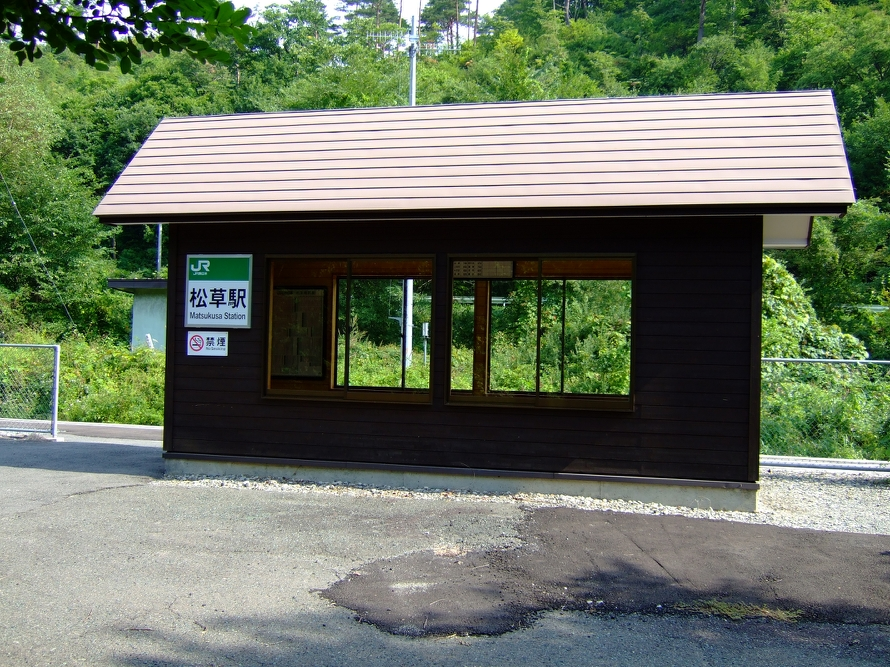
- Matsukusa Station, August 2006

General information
- Location: Kuzakai Dai-yon jiwari 28, Miyako-shi, Iwate-ken 028-2631; Japan
- Coordinates: 39.6359°N 141.4373°E
- Operator: JR East
- Line: ■ Yamada Line
- Distance: 43.3 km from Morioka
- Platforms: 1 side platform
- Tracks: 1

Construction
- Structure type: At grade

Other information
- Status: Unstaffed
- Website: Official website

History
- Opened: 31 October 1930

Services
Preceding station	JR East	Following station
Kuzakai towards Morioka	Yamada Line Local	Hiratsuto towards Miyako
Location
- Location within Japan

Matsukusa Station (松草駅, Matsukusa-eki) is a railway station on the Yamada Line in the city of Miyako, Iwate, Japan, operated by East Japan Railway Company (JR East). And, passengers who use this station should use route bus which operates a lot because only one round-trip train stops at this station on specific days.

== Lines ==
Matsukusa Station is served by the Yamada Line, and is located 43.3 rail kilometers from the terminus of the line at Morioka Station.

== Station layout ==
Matsukusa Station has a single side platform serving a single bi-directional track. There is no station building, but there is a weather shelter on the platform. The station is unattended.

== History ==
Matsukusa Station opened on 31 October 1930. The station was absorbed into the JR East network upon the privatization of the Japanese National Railways (JNR) on 1 April 1987.

== Surrounding area ==
- Japan National Route 106

== Bus routes ==
- 106 Express bus - For Miyako Station/Morioka Station

== See also ==
- List of railway stations in Japan
