= Yonai =

Yonai (米内, lit. "rice inside") is a Japanese surname. It may refer to:

- Kami-Yonai Station, a railway station on the Yamada Line in Morioka, Iwate, Japan

== People ==
- Mitsumasa Yonai (1880–1948), 37th Prime Minister of Japan
- Yonai Norimoto, founder of Japanese animation studio Lay-duce
