= Yamagishi Station =

Railway station in Morioka, Iwate Prefecture, Japan

Yamagishi Station 山岸駅
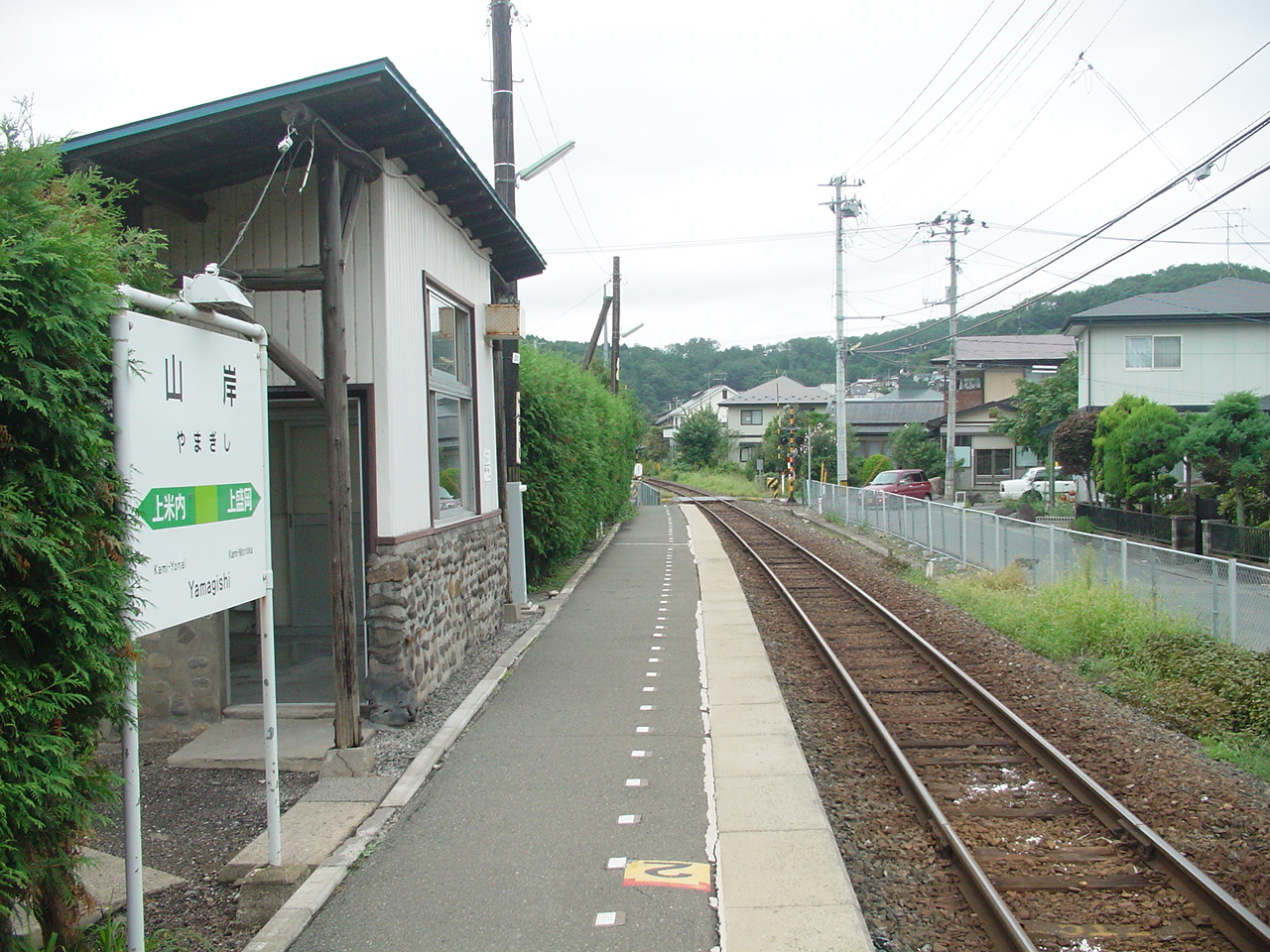
- Yamagishi Station, September 2007

General information
- Location: Yamagishi 2-chome 15, Morioka-shi, Iwate-ken 020-0004; Japan
- Coordinates: 39.7159°N 141.1712°E
- Operator: JR East
- Line: ■ Yamada Line
- Distance: 4.9 km from Morioka
- Platforms: 1 side platform
- Tracks: 1

Construction
- Structure type: At grade

Other information
- Status: Unstaffed
- Website: Official website

History
- Opened: 10 February 1952

Services
Preceding station	JR East	Following station
Kamimorioka towards Morioka	Yamada Line Rapid Rias; Local	Kamiyonai towards Miyako
Location
- Location within Japan

Yamagishi Station (山岸駅, Yamagishi-eki) is a railway station on the Yamada Line in the city of Morioka, Iwate, Japan, operated by the East Japan Railway Company (JR East).

== Lines ==
Yamagishi Station is served by the Yamada Line, and is located 4.9 rail kilometers from the terminus of the line at Morioka Station.

== Station layout ==
Yamagishi Station has a single side platform serving a single bi-directional track. The station is unattended.

== History ==
Yamagishi Station opened on 10 February 1952. The station was absorbed into the JR East network upon the privatization of the Japanese National Railways (JNR) on 1 April 1987.

== Surrounding area ==
- Iwate Prefectural Office
- Morioka City Zoo
- Nakatsu River
