= Kamimorioka Station =

Railway station in Morioka, Iwate Prefecture, Japan

Kamimorioka Station 上盛岡駅
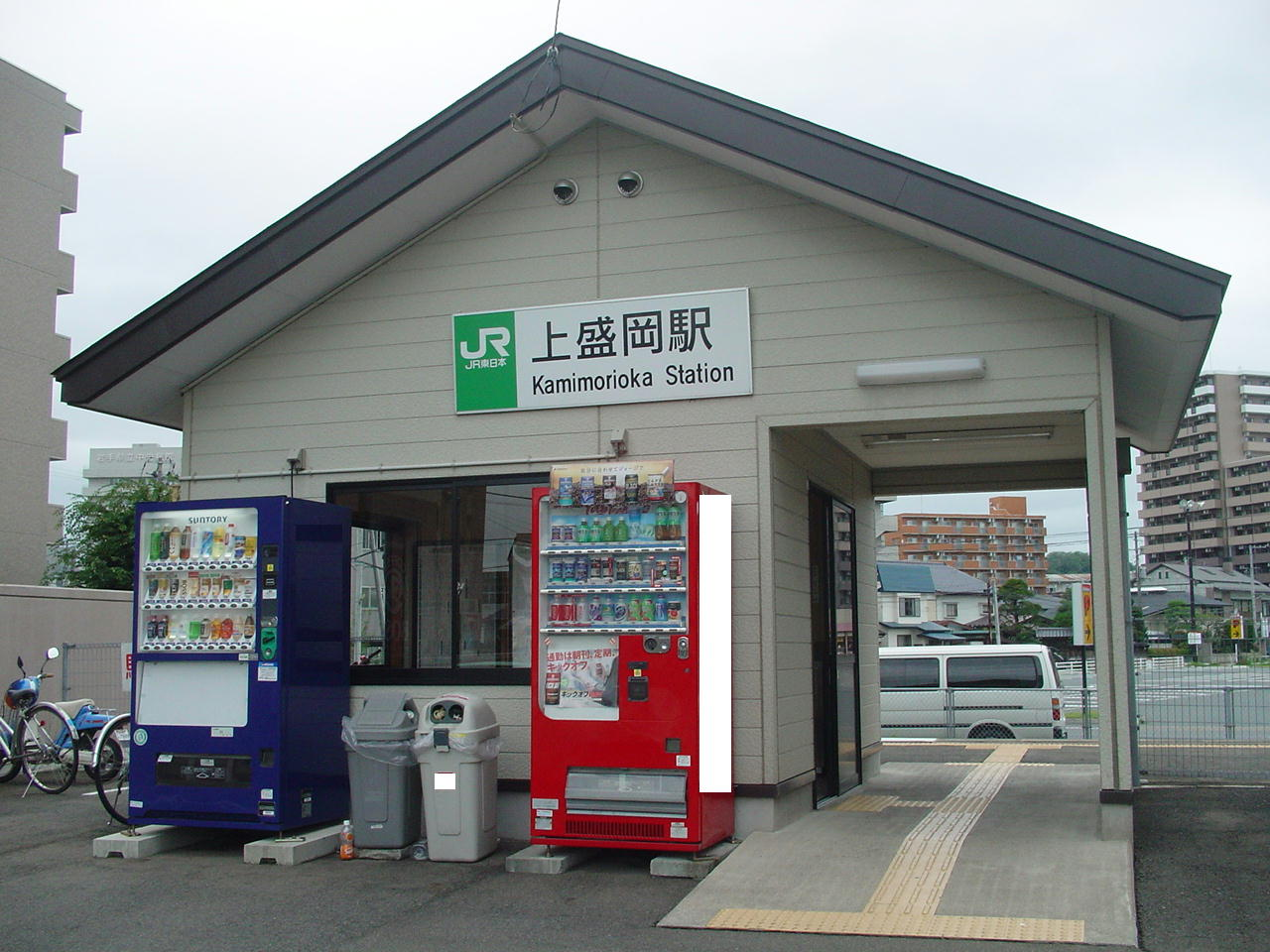
- Kamimorioka Station, September 2007

General information
- Location: 3-11 Honchōdōri, Morioka-shi, Iwate-ken 020-0015; Japan
- Coordinates: 39.7113°N 141.1482°E
- Operator: JR East
- Line: ■ Yamada Line
- Distance: 2.8 km from Morioka
- Platforms: 1 side platform
- Tracks: 1

Construction
- Structure type: At grade

Other information
- Status: Unstaffed
- Website: Official website

History
- Opened: 10 October 1923

Services
Preceding station	JR East	Following station
Morioka Terminus	Yamada Line Rapid Rias; Local	Yamagishi towards Miyako
Location
- Location within Japan

Kamimorioka Station (上盛岡駅, Kamimorioka-eki) is a railway station on the Yamada Line in the city of Morioka, Iwate, Japan, operated by East Japan Railway Company (JR East).

== Lines ==
Kamimorioka Station is served by the Yamada Line, and is located 2.8 rail kilometers from the terminus of the line at Morioka Station.

== Station layout ==
Kamimorioka Station has a single side platform serving a single bi-directional track. The station is unattended.

== History ==
Kamimorioka Station opened on 10 October 1923. The station was absorbed into the JR East network upon the privatization of the Japanese National Railways (JNR) on 1 April 1987.

== Surrounding area ==
- Iwate Prefectural Office
- Morioka City Hall
- Morioka City Library
- Iwate University
- Iwate Medical University
- National Route 4
- National Route 46
- National Route 455
