= Asagishi Station =

Former railway station in Morioka, Iwate Prefecture, Japan

Coordinates: 39.7111°N 141.3389°E

Asagishi Station 浅岸駅
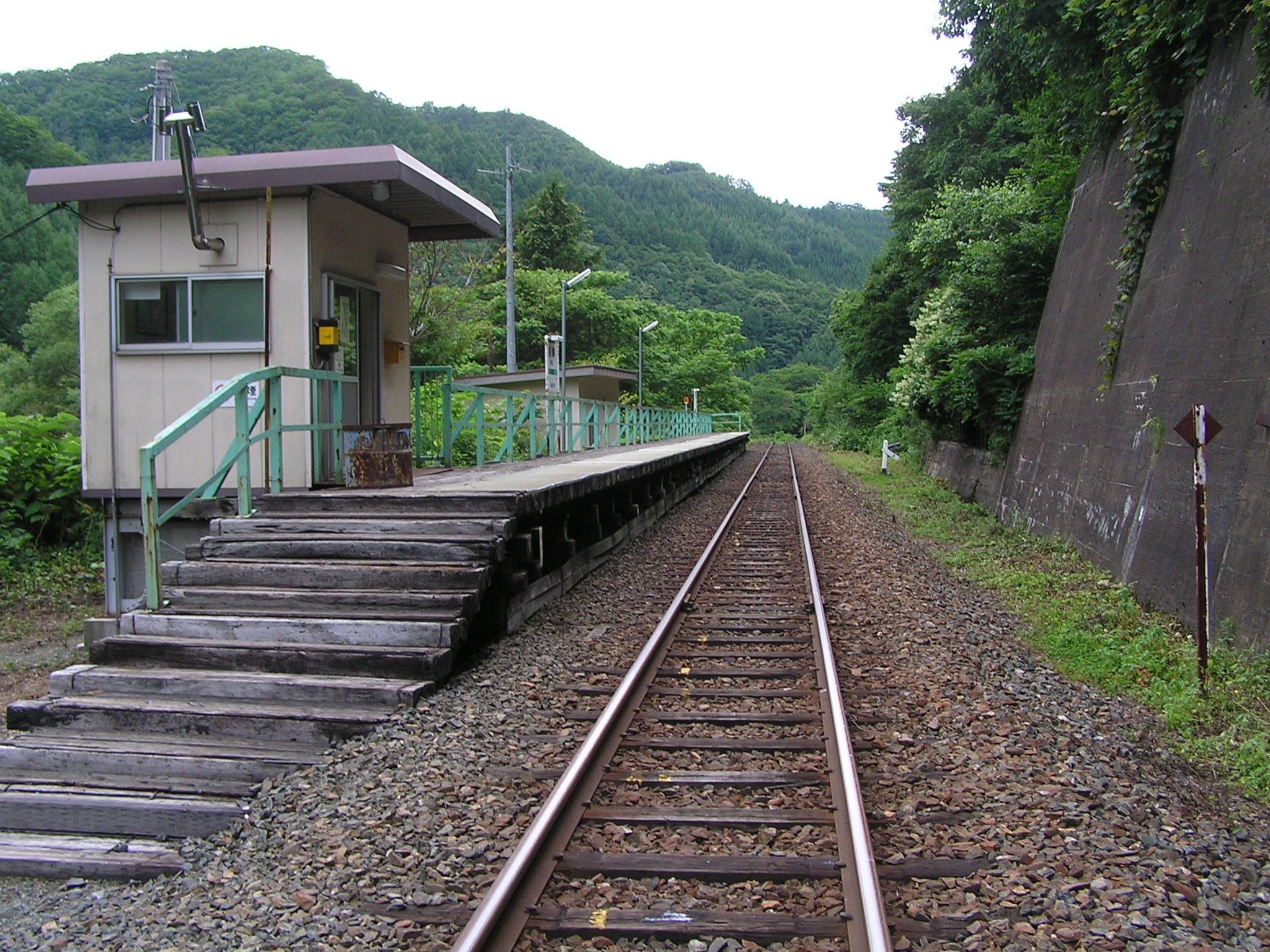
- Asagishi Station in August 2006

General information
- Location: Nakatsugawa, Shinjo, Morioka-shi, Iwate-ken 020-0803; Japan
- Operator: JR East
- Line: ■ Yamada Line
- Distance: 27.6 km from Morioka
- Platforms: 1 side platform
- Tracks: 1

Other information
- Status: Closed

History
- Opened: 25 September 1928
- Closed: 25 March 2016

Passengers
- 0.3 per day (FY2015)
Location
- Location within Japan

Asagishi Station (浅岸駅, Asagishi-eki) was a railway station on the Yamada Line in Morioka, Iwate, Japan, operated by East Japan Railway Company (JR East). Opened in 1928, the station closed in March 2016.

== Lines ==
Asagishi Station was served by the Yamada Line from Morioka to Kamaishi, and was located 27.6 kilometers from the line's starting point at Morioka Station.

== Station layout ==
Asagishi Station has a single side platform serving traffic in both directions. The station is unstaffed.

== Services ==
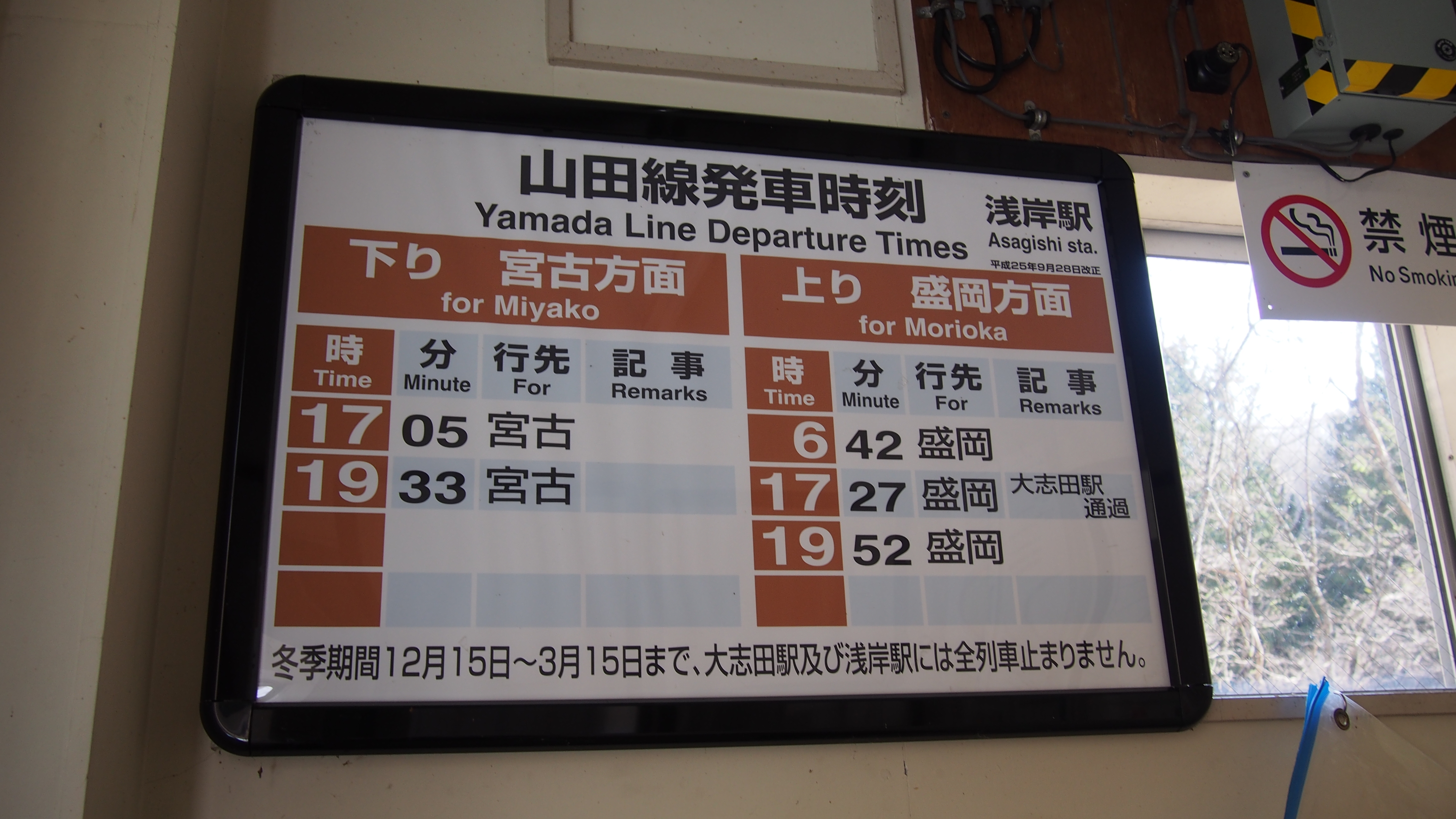
The station timetable in September 2013

By late 2013, the station was normally served by a total of just five services daily, but from January until 15 March 2013, no trains stopped at this station during the winter period.

== Adjacent stations ==
«	Service	»
Yamada Line
Ōshida		Kuzakai

== History ==
Asagishi Station opened on 25 September 1928. With the privatization of Japanese National Railways (JNR) on 1 April 1987, the station came under the control of JR East.

=== Closure ===
In August 2015, JR East notified the city of Morioka that it was considering closing Asagashi and Ōshida Station on the Yamada Line, possibly by March 2016, due to low patronage. In December 2015, JR East announced that it would be formally closing the station from the start of the following timetable revision.

The station closed following the last day of services on 25 March 2016.

== Passenger statistics ==
As of August 2015, the station was used by an average of just 0.3 passengers daily (boarding passengers only).

== Surrounding area ==
The station was situated in a remote area location with just two households living within a radius of 2.5 km (as of August 2015).

== See also ==
- List of railway stations in Japan
