= Yamada Line (JR East) =

Railway line in Iwate Prefecture, Japan

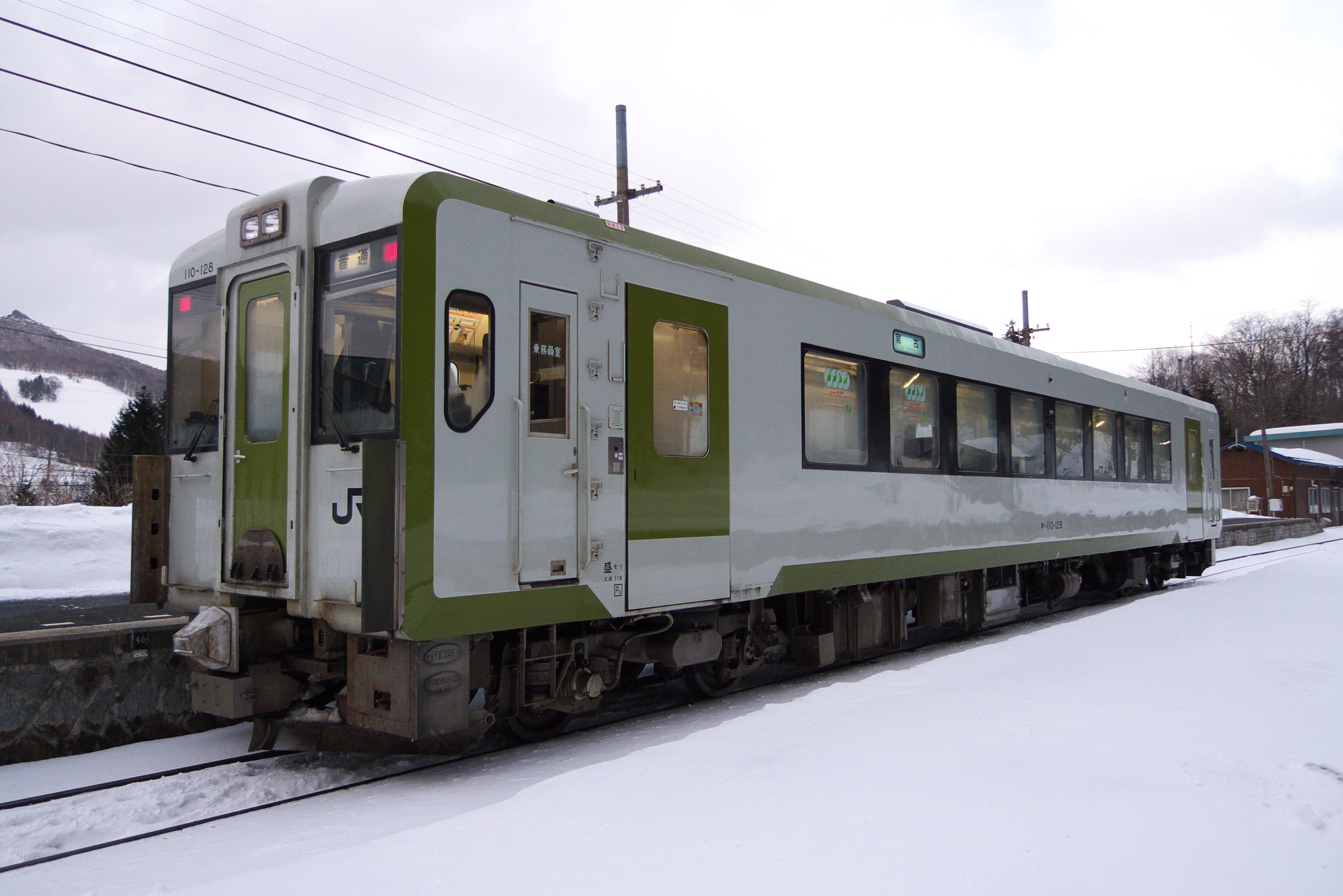
- A KiHa 110 series DMU car on the Yamada Line in March 2012

Overview
- Native name: 山田線
- Status: In operation
- Owner: JR East
- Locale: Iwate Prefecture
- Termini: Morioka; Miyako
- Stations: 15

Service
- Type: Heavy rail
- Operator: JR East
- Rolling stock: KiHa 110 series DMU

History
- Opened: 10 October 1923

Technical
- Line length: 102.1 km (63.4 mi)
- Number of tracks: Entire line single tracked
- Character: Rural
- Track gauge: 1,067 mm (3 ft 6 in)
- Electrification: None
- Operating speed: 85 km/h (53 mph)
Route map

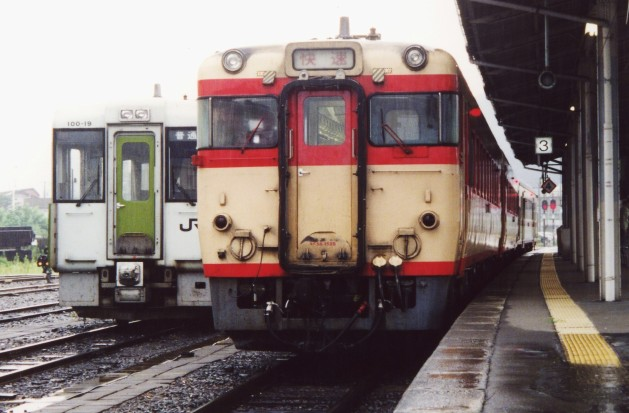
Old type Yamada Line diesel cars (right) and new type ones (left) at Miyako Station in 2002

The Yamada Line (山田線, Yamada-sen) is a regional railway line in Japan operated by East Japan Railway Company (JR East). The railway line connects Morioka Station in Morioka City to Miyako Station in Miyako City, and is named after the town of Yamada in Iwate Prefecture, which the line used to serve. The railway line traverses through the Kitakami Mountains, running parallel to National Route 106 for most of its length. In April 2025, JR East commenced to cooperate with Iwate Kempoku Bus and you are able to ride 106 Express Bus that Iwate Kempoku Bus operates by tickets of JR East Yamada Line. In March 2026, almost all trains were replaced by 106 Express Bus which is parallel running.

== History ==
=== 19th to 20th century ===
The Yamada Line was planned to connect Morioka with the Sanriku region, and was originally planned to run from Morioka to Rikuchu-Yamada, as stipulated in the Railway Construction Law of 1892. An environmental survey was carried out, but because the proposed route of the Yamada Line was to cross through the Kitakami Mountains between Morioka and Miyako at an altitude of over 1,000m (751m above sea level), construction of the line initially failed to materialise. It was not until 1920, when Hara Takashi, who had become the Prime Minister of Japan two years prior and had been a native of Iwate Prefecture, made the decision to build the line. The Yamada Line later opened in stages; the section from Morioka to Kami-Yonai opened on 10 October 1923, and the rest of the line to Rikuchu-Yamada opened by 1935.

An extension of the Yamada Line south of Rikuchu-Yamada was planned to be constructed as part of the "Railway from Yamada to Kamaishi to Ofunato in Iwate Prefecture", as defined in Appendix No. 7 of the Revised Railway Construction Act. The extension of the Yamada Line from Rikuchu-Yamada up to Kamaishi was opened by 1939, prior to the outbreak of World War II.

After the opening of the Yamada Line, passenger trains travelling between Morioka and Miyako became so congested that it was often impossible to sit down and people had to stand up on the trains. Prior to the final extension of the Kamaishi Line in 1950 to Kamaishi, the Yamada Line was the only direct line between the coast and the inland areas of northern Iwate, and upon the extension of the Yamada Line to Kamaishi by 1939, freight traffic began using the Yamada Line throughout the day and night, as it formed the sole rail connection between Kamaishi and the Tohoku Main Line.

In November 1946, after the Pacific War, the Yamada Line was closed for a long time between Hiratsuto and Toyomane Stations due to wind and flood damage. As a replacement for the closed section of the Yamada Line, the Supreme Commander for the Allied Powers ordered the Kamaishi Line to be rebuilt and extended to Kamaishi. Following the opening of the Kamaishi Line extension to Kamaishi, the principal route for inland freight transport from Kamaishi was shifted away from the Yamada Line to the Kamaishi Line, and the relative importance of the Yamada Line declined. Freight services on the Yamada Line would later cease altogether on 1 November 1986, and ownership of the Yamada Line was transferred over to JR East following the privatisation of Japanese National Railways (JNR) on 1 April 1987, which integrated the line into the JR East network.

=== 21st century ===
The 2011 Tohoku earthquake and tsunami on 11 March 2011 flooded 21.7 km of the railway line between Miyako and Kamaishi (55.4 km), destroying four of the 13 stations, 10% of the tracks, six railway bridges and ten embankments, forcing the closure of the entire Yamada Line. While the section of the Yamada Line between Morioka and Miyako reopened on 26 March 2011, the railway line between Miyako and Kamaishi, which parallels the Sanriku-Kaigan area of the Pacific coast, was extensively damaged or washed away altogether. Rail service on this section would not resume for eight years.

Ōshida and Asagishi Stations were temporarily closed from January until 15 March 2013 due to low passenger numbers during the winter months. The two stations would later be closed permanently, following the last day of services on 25 March 2016.

Hiratsuto Station was closed permanently on 17 March 2023, owing to declining passenger numbers.

==== Failed temporary BRT proposals ====
In February 2012, JR East submitted a proposal to formally close the Yamada Line permanently between Miyako and Kamaishi, and the line's right-of-way converted into a bus rapid transit (BRT) route instead. On 25 June 2012, a Public Transport Security Council, which consisted of the representatives of four cities and towns along the Yamada Line, Iwate Prefecture, and other organisations, was convened in a meeting held behind closed doors to discuss the restoration of the remaining section of the Yamada Line between Miyako and Kamaishi. The meeting discussed measures to ensure the continuity of alternative forms of public transport until the restoration of the Yamada Line, which was damaged in the earthquake, and concluded that the restoration of the line would take a considerable amount of time, as there were many issues to be addressed in each area, such as ensuring safety and consistency with urban development. JR East proposed to convert the damaged section of the Yamada Line into a right-of-way for a bus rapid transit route as a "temporary" measure; the conversion would be similar to how the Kesennuma Line and Ofunato Line had their heavily damaged sections converted into BRT routes. The cost of paving the railway line's right-of-way into a deliciated road for BRT buses would be borne by JR East, but as the Yamada Line has many damaged railway bridges, the proposed BRT route would use the parallel National Route 45 in areas where the railway line was too damaged to be repaired, with the dedicated road being approximately 10 km long. However, the representatives of the four cities and towns criticised JR East's BRT proposal, citing how the BRT would have to compete with existing private buses that have been running since before the earthquake, and that their "town planning is based on the premise that the railway line will be restored". As a result, the four local municipalities rejected JR East's BRT proposal.

On 25 September 2013, JR East re-proposed the introduction of BRT on the Yamada Line. In response to criticism of JR East's previous BRT proposal, the new proposal by JR East would have restored four bridges that were washed out by the tsunami, and increased the total length of the dedicated road by approximately 16 km compared to the previous proposal, for a total length of 25.3 km (which is 46% of the distance between Miyako and Kamaishi). However, the four local municipalities again rejected the new proposal.

==== Transfer to Sanriku Railway ====
On 31 January 2014, JR East stated that it would bear ¥14 billion of the estimated ¥21 billion cost of restoring the line and facilities to their original state; the remaining ¥7 billion cost would be borne by local authorities and public funds. The restoration of the damaged railway tracks and station buildings, and the cost of ¥500 million to make up for the deficit over 10 years, would be borne by JR East, and the damaged section of the Yamada Line would be transferred to Sanriku Railway. As a result, the two former lines of Sanriku Railway (Kita-Rias in the north and Minami-Rias in the south), were connected and began operation as a single line (the Rias Line), allowing for a "compact, community-based management and a highly sustainable management structure".

Consequently, JR East abandoned its BRT proposals in 2015 and the closed section of the line began to be rebuilt, with the aim of transferring the closed section to Sanriku Railway.

On 23 March 2019, the section of the Yamada Line between Miyako and Kamaishi reopened, and was transferred to the Sanriku Railway, which integrated the section to become part of the Rias Line.

==== Corporation with other company ====
Since 2025, only one round-trip has stopped at all stations of Yamada Line on specific days. And, two round-trip has run as rapid train in all sections on specific days. So, route buses that Michinori Holdings Group Iwate Kenpoku bus operates replaced almost all trains of Yamada Line and the bus timetable displays on a timetable of JR East. At present, local trains run everyday between Morioka Station and Kamiyonai Station or between Kawauchi Station and Miyako Station, because too many passengers who are workers and highschool students to carry by bus use.

== Operation ==
=== Service ===
JR East offers two different services on the Yamada Line:

- Local - Trains stop at all stations along the line. This train runs one round-trip between Morioka and Miyako on specific days. Almost all local trains run between Kamiyonai Station and Morioka Station or between Kawauchi Station and Miyako Station.
- Rapid Rias - Trains stop at selected stations along the line. This train runs two round-trip on specific days.

=== Station list ===
Rapid Rias trains stop at stations marked "●" and skip stations marked "｜".

Station	Japanese	Distance (km)	Rapid Rias	Transfers	Location	
Morioka	盛岡	0.0	●	Tohoku Shinkansen; Akita Shinkansen; ■ Tohoku Main Line; ■ Tazawako Line; Iwate Galaxy Railway Line	Morioka	Iwate Prefecture
Kami-Morioka	上盛岡	2.8	●		Morioka	Iwate Prefecture
Yamagishi	山岸	4.9	●		Morioka	Iwate Prefecture
Kami-Yonai	上米内	9.9	●		Morioka	Iwate Prefecture
~~Ōshida~~ (Note: Closed on 25 March 2016.)	大志田	19.2	｜		Morioka	Iwate Prefecture
~~Asagishi~~	浅岸	27.6	｜		Morioka	Iwate Prefecture
Kuzakai	区界	35.6	｜		Miyako	Iwate Prefecture
Matsukusa	松草	43.6	｜		Miyako	Iwate Prefecture
~~Hiratsuto~~ (Note: Closed on 17 March 2023.)	平津戸	52.2	｜		Miyako	Iwate Prefecture
Kawauchi	川内	61.5	｜		Miyako	Iwate Prefecture
Hakoishi	箱石	65.7	｜		Miyako	Iwate Prefecture
Rikuchū-Kawai	陸中川井	73.5	●		Miyako	Iwate Prefecture
Haratai	腹帯	82.6	｜		Miyako	Iwate Prefecture
Moichi	茂市	87.0	●	~~■~~ ~~Iwaizumi Line~~ (Closed on 1 April 2014)	Miyako	Iwate Prefecture
Hikime	蟇目	91.5	｜		Miyako	Iwate Prefecture
Kebaraichi	花原市	94.2	｜		Miyako	Iwate Prefecture
Sentoku	千徳	98.8	●		Miyako	Iwate Prefecture
Miyako	宮古	102.1	●	■ Sanriku Railway Rias Line	Miyako	Iwate Prefecture

== See also ==
- List of railway lines in Japan
