= Yamaguchi Danchi Station =

Railway station in Miyako, Iwate Prefecture, Japan

Yamaguchi Danchi Station 山口団地駅
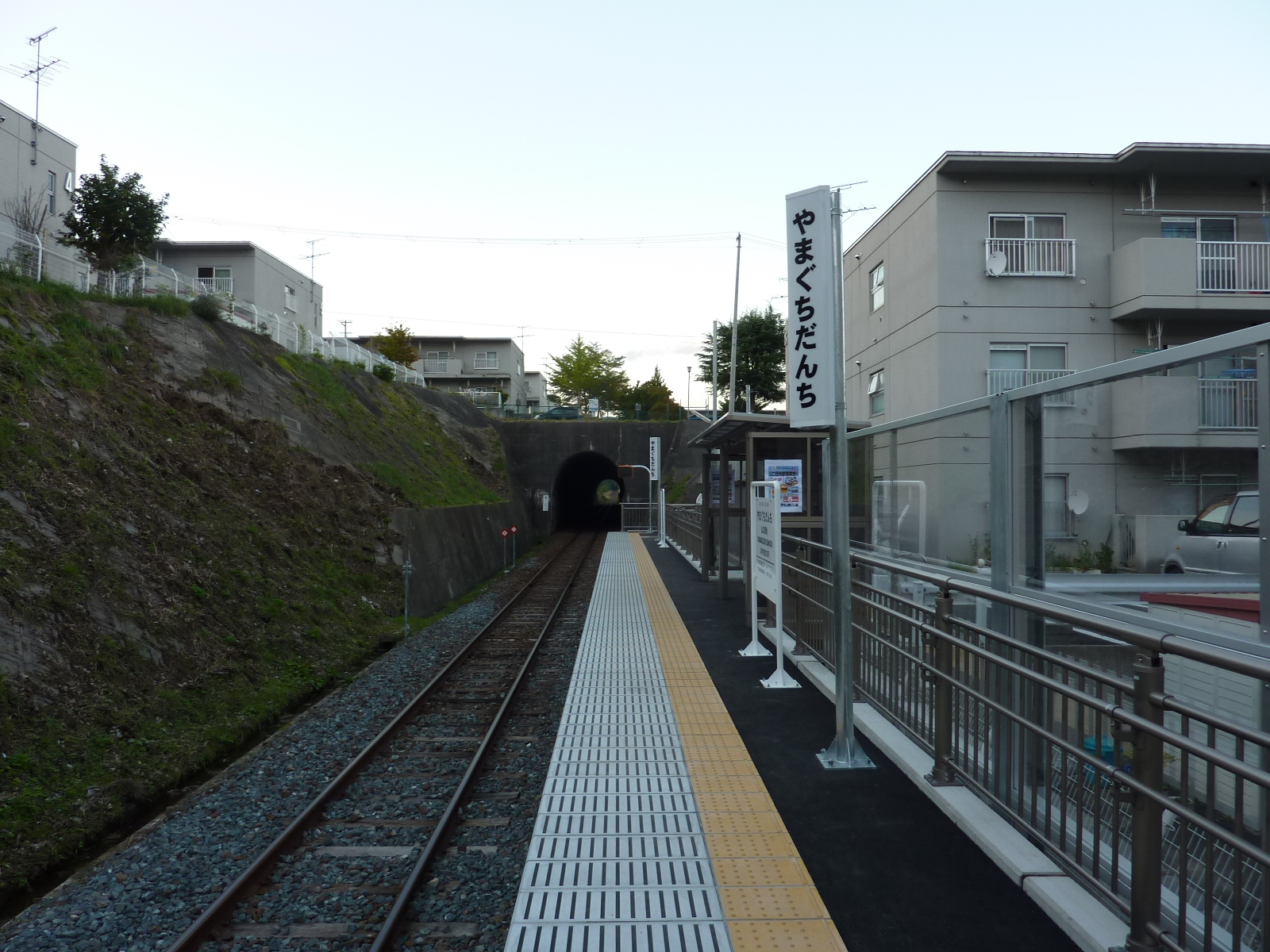
- Yamaguchi Danchi Station in October 2010

General information
- Location: Yamaguchi 3-203-1, Miyako-shi, Iwate-ken 027-0063; Japan
- Coordinates: 39°38′46.79″N 141°55′59.60″E
- Operator: Sanriku Railway
- Line: ■ Rias Line
- Distance: 93.6 km from Sakari
- Platforms: 1 side platform
- Tracks: 1

Construction
- Structure type: At grade

Other information
- Status: Unstaffed
- Website: Official website

History
- Opened: 16 October 2010

Passengers
- FY2015: 6 daily
Location
- Location within Japan

Yamaguchi Danchi Station (山口団地駅, Yamaguchi Danchi-eki) is a railway station on the Sanriku Railway Company’s Rias Line located in the city of Miyako, Iwate Prefecture, Japan.

== Lines ==
Yamaguchi Danchi-eki Station is served by the Rias Line, and is located 93.6 rail kilometers from the terminus of the line at Sakari Station.

== Station layout ==
The station has a single side platform serving a single bi-directional track. There is no station building, but only a rain shelter on the platform.

== Adjacent stations ==
←	Service	→
Sanriku Railway Company
Miyako	Local	Ichinowatari

== History ==
Yamaguchi Danchi Station opened on 16 October 2010. During the 11 March 2011 Tōhoku earthquake and tsunami, part of the tracks and the station building at Shimanokoshi were swept away, thus suspending services on a portion of the Sanriku Railway. However, the portion of the line from Miyako to Tarō resumed operations on 20 March 2011. Minami-Rias Line, a portion of Yamada Line, and Kita-Rias Line constitute Rias Line on 23 March 2019. Accordingly, this station became an intermediate station of Rias Line.

== Passenger statistics ==
In fiscal 2015, the station was used by 6 passengers daily.。

== Surrounding area ==
- Yamaguchi Danchi public housing

== See also ==
- List of railway stations in Japan
