= Kuzakai Station =

Railway station in Miyako, Iwate Prefecture, Japan

Kuzakai Station 区界駅
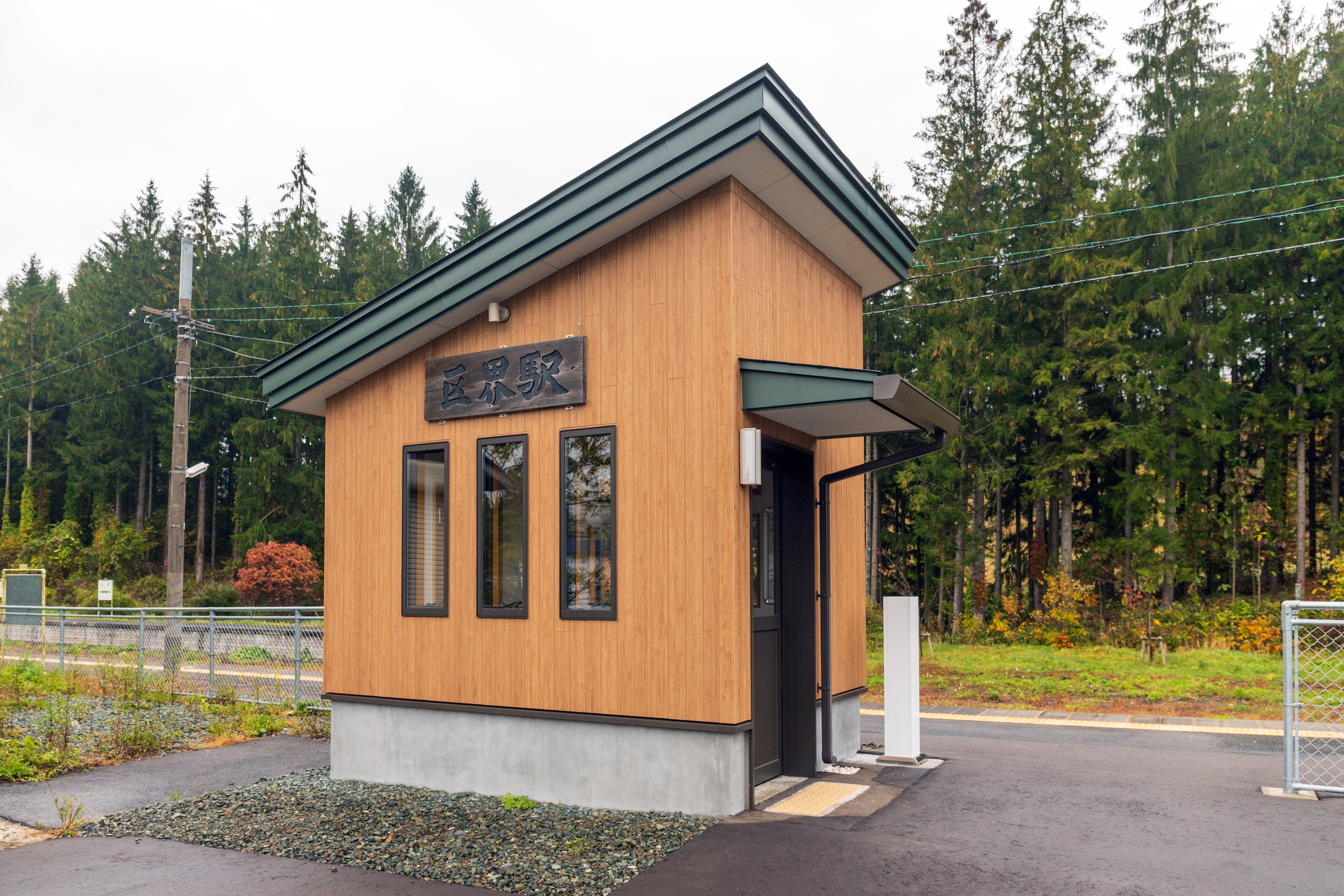
- Kuzakai Station in 2022

General information
- Location: Kuzakai Dai-ichi jiwari 1009, Miyako-shi, Iwate-ken 028-2631; Japan
- Coordinates: 39.6520°N 141.3514°E
- Operator: JR East
- Line: ■ Yamada Line
- Distance: 35.6 km from Morioka
- Platforms: 2 side platforms
- Tracks: 2

Other information
- Website: www.jreast.co.jp/estation/station/info.aspx?StationCd=613

History
- Opened: 25 September 1928

Passengers
- FY2015: 1 (daily)

Services
Preceding station	JR East	Following station
Kamiyonai towards Morioka	Yamada Line Local	Matsukusa towards Miyako
Location

Kuzakai Station (区界駅, Kuzakai-eki) is a railway station on the Yamada Line in the city of Miyako, Iwate, Japan, operated by East Japan Railway Company (JR East). And, passengers who use this station should use route bus which operates a lot because only one round-trip train stops at this station on specific days.

== Lines ==
Kuzakai Station is served by the Yamada Line, and is located 35.6 kilometers from the terminus of the line at Morioka Station.

== Station layout ==
Kuzakai Station has two opposed side platforms connected to the station building by a level crossing. The station is staffed.

=== Platforms ===
1	■ Yamada Line	for Moichi and Miyako
2	■ Yamada Line	for Kamiyonai and Morioka

== History ==
Kuzakai Station opened on 25 September 1928. The station was absorbed into the JR East network upon the privatization of the Japanese National Railways (JNR) on 1 April 1987.

2020: New station building opened

== Passenger statistics ==
In fiscal 2015, the station was used by an average of 1 passenger daily (boarding passengers only).

== Surrounding area ==
- National Route 106

== Bus routes ==
- 106 Express Bus - For Miyako Station/Morioka Station

== Climate ==
Climate data for Kuzakai Station (1993−2020 normals, extremes 1993−present)
Month	Jan	Feb	Mar	Apr	May	Jun	Jul	Aug	Sep	Oct	Nov	Dec	Year
Record high °C (°F)	8.0 (46.4)	12.7 (54.9)	15.0 (59.0)	24.0 (75.2)	28.6 (83.5)	28.0 (82.4)	30.9 (87.6)	31.6 (88.9)	28.6 (83.5)	23.4 (74.1)	19.9 (67.8)	14.0 (57.2)	31.6 (88.9)
Mean daily maximum °C (°F)	−2.7 (27.1)	−1.6 (29.1)	2.3 (36.1)	9.5 (49.1)	16.1 (61.0)	19.7 (67.5)	23.1 (73.6)	24.1 (75.4)	19.9 (67.8)	13.6 (56.5)	6.9 (44.4)	0.3 (32.5)	10.9 (51.7)
Daily mean °C (°F)	−6.1 (21.0)	−5.4 (22.3)	−1.8 (28.8)	4.5 (40.1)	10.7 (51.3)	14.8 (58.6)	19.0 (66.2)	19.8 (67.6)	15.5 (59.9)	8.8 (47.8)	2.8 (37.0)	−3.0 (26.6)	6.6 (43.9)
Mean daily minimum °C (°F)	−11.2 (11.8)	−10.8 (12.6)	−7.1 (19.2)	−0.9 (30.4)	4.7 (40.5)	9.7 (49.5)	15.3 (59.5)	15.8 (60.4)	11.1 (52.0)	3.5 (38.3)	−2.1 (28.2)	−7.4 (18.7)	1.7 (35.1)
Record low °C (°F)	−24.1 (−11.4)	−22.9 (−9.2)	−20.3 (−4.5)	−11.5 (11.3)	−4.0 (24.8)	0.4 (32.7)	4.7 (40.5)	2.7 (36.9)	−1.6 (29.1)	−6.2 (20.8)	−13.5 (7.7)	−18.9 (−2.0)	−24.1 (−11.4)
Average precipitation mm (inches)	59.3 (2.33)	48.6 (1.91)	98.2 (3.87)	111.1 (4.37)	127.6 (5.02)	130.7 (5.15)	218.7 (8.61)	208.8 (8.22)	177.3 (6.98)	133.5 (5.26)	112.9 (4.44)	89.4 (3.52)	1,517.7 (59.75)
Average snowfall cm (inches)	142 (56)	134 (53)	125 (49)	33 (13)	0 (0)	0 (0)	0 (0)	0 (0)	0 (0)	0 (0)	21 (8.3)	114 (45)	571 (225)
Average rainy days	13.8	12.2	14.8	13.3	13.1	11.8	15.6	13.6	13.8	13.3	14.9	15.0	165.2
Average snowy days	16.8	14.7	14.4	4.1	0	0	0	0	0	0	2.7	13.6	66.3
Mean monthly sunshine hours	64.0	75.1	107.2	146.4	174.3	148.9	121.9	139.8	123.7	132.8	100.0	64.2	1,403.2
Source 1: JMA
Source 2: JMA

== See also ==
- List of railway stations in Japan
