= Miyako, Iwate =

Miyako 宮古市
- City
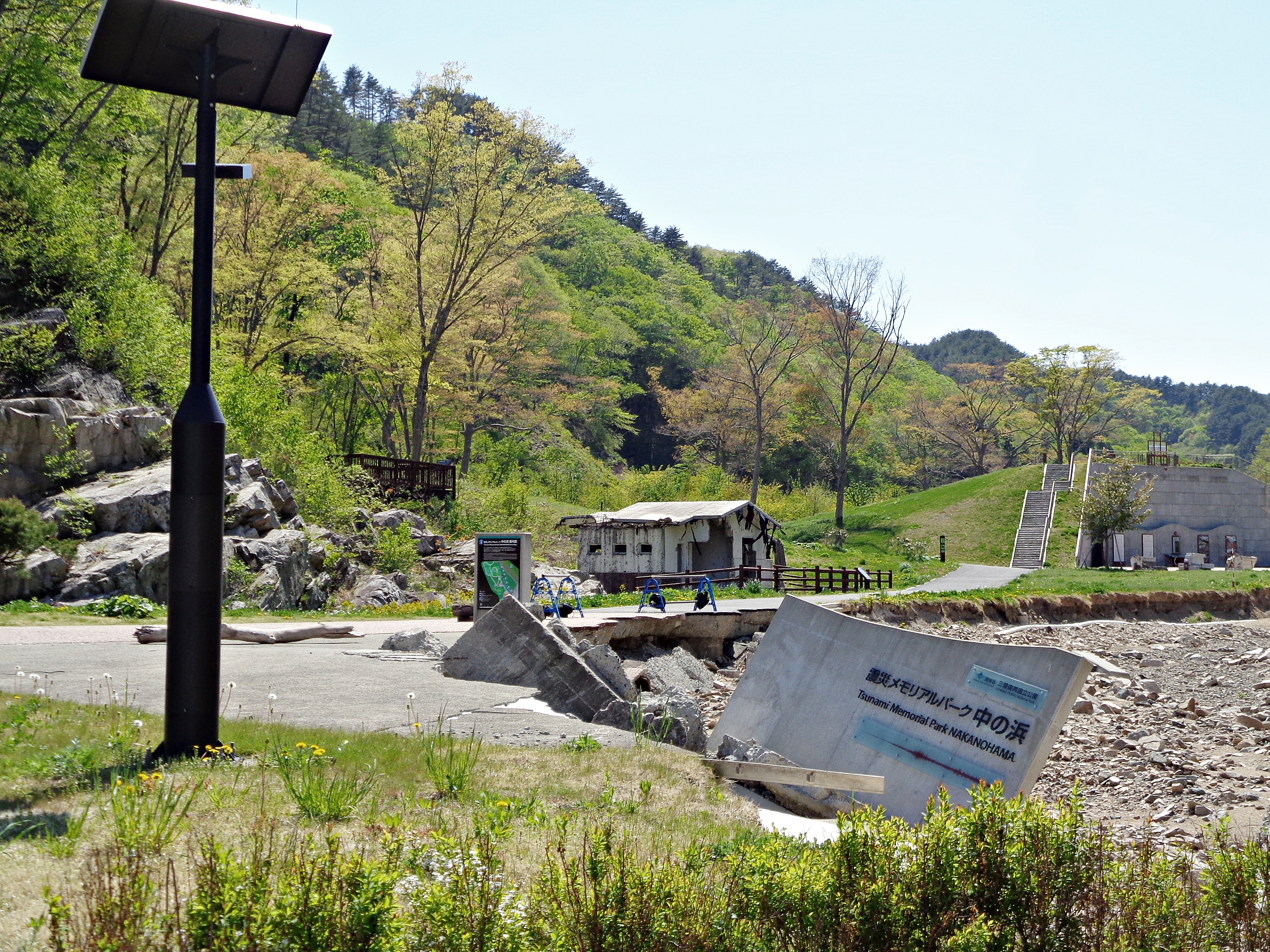
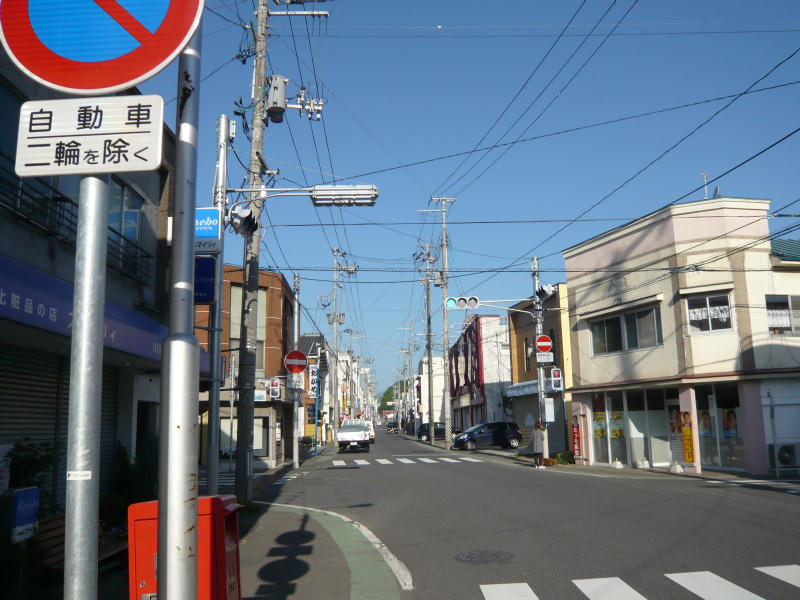
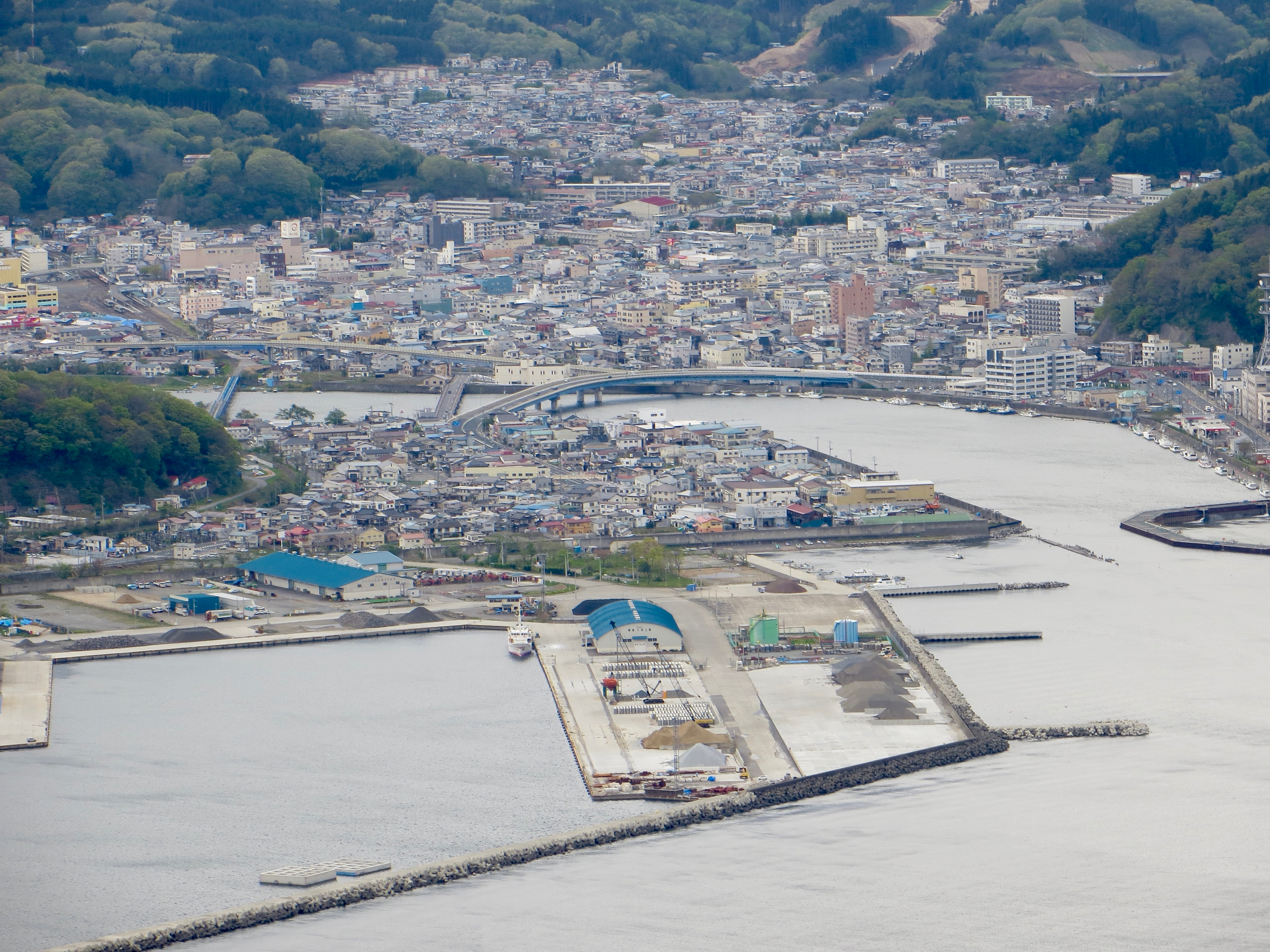
- Earthquake Memorial Park Miyako downtown Miyako skyline

- Flag Seal
- Interactive map of Miyako
- Coordinates: 39°38′29.1″N 141°57′25.7″E
- Country: Japan
- Region: Tōhoku
- Prefecture: Iwate

Government
  - -Mayor: Masanori Yamamoto (since 2009)

Area
  - Total: 1,259.15 km^{2} (486.16 sq mi)

Population (April 1, 2020)
  - Total: 51,150
  - Density: 40.62/km^{2} (105.2/sq mi)
- Time zone: UTC+09:00 (Japan Standard Time)
- City symbols
- Tree: Japanese red pine
- Flower: Montauk daisy (Nipponanthemum nipponicum)
- Bird: Black-tailed gull
- Fish: Chum salmon
- Phone number: 0193-62-2111
- Address: 2-1 Shinkawachō, Miyako-shi, Iwate-ken 027-8501
- Website: Official website

Miyako (宮古市, Miyako-shi) is a city located in Iwate Prefecture, Japan. As of 1 April 2020, the city had an estimated population of 51,150, and a population density of 41 persons per km^{2}. The total area of the city is 1,259.15 square kilometers (486.16 sq mi).

== Geography ==
Miyako is located in central Iwate Prefecture, bordered by the Pacific Ocean to the east, with the main urban area fronting on Miyako Bay. It is located at the northern end of the rias coastal area of the Sanriku Coast, east of the prefectural capital of Morioka. The city area is the largest in Iwate Prefecture and the second largest in the Tōhoku region (after Tsuruoka, Yamagata). However, around 90% of the city area is covered by mountains and forest, so the habitable area is only about 9% of the total area, and therefore although the population density per total area is low, but the population density per habitable area exceeds the prefecture average. Miyako is connected to Morioka by an east–west train line and highway and the coastal highway also goes through the town. The city has a small port but much of the shipping traffic is taken by larger cities along the coast. Parts of the coastal area of the city are within the borders of the Sanriku Fukkō National Park, and part of the mountainous interior is within Hayachine Quasi-National Park. The easternmost point of Honshu island is at Cape Todo (魹ヶ崎, Todogasaki) in Miyako.

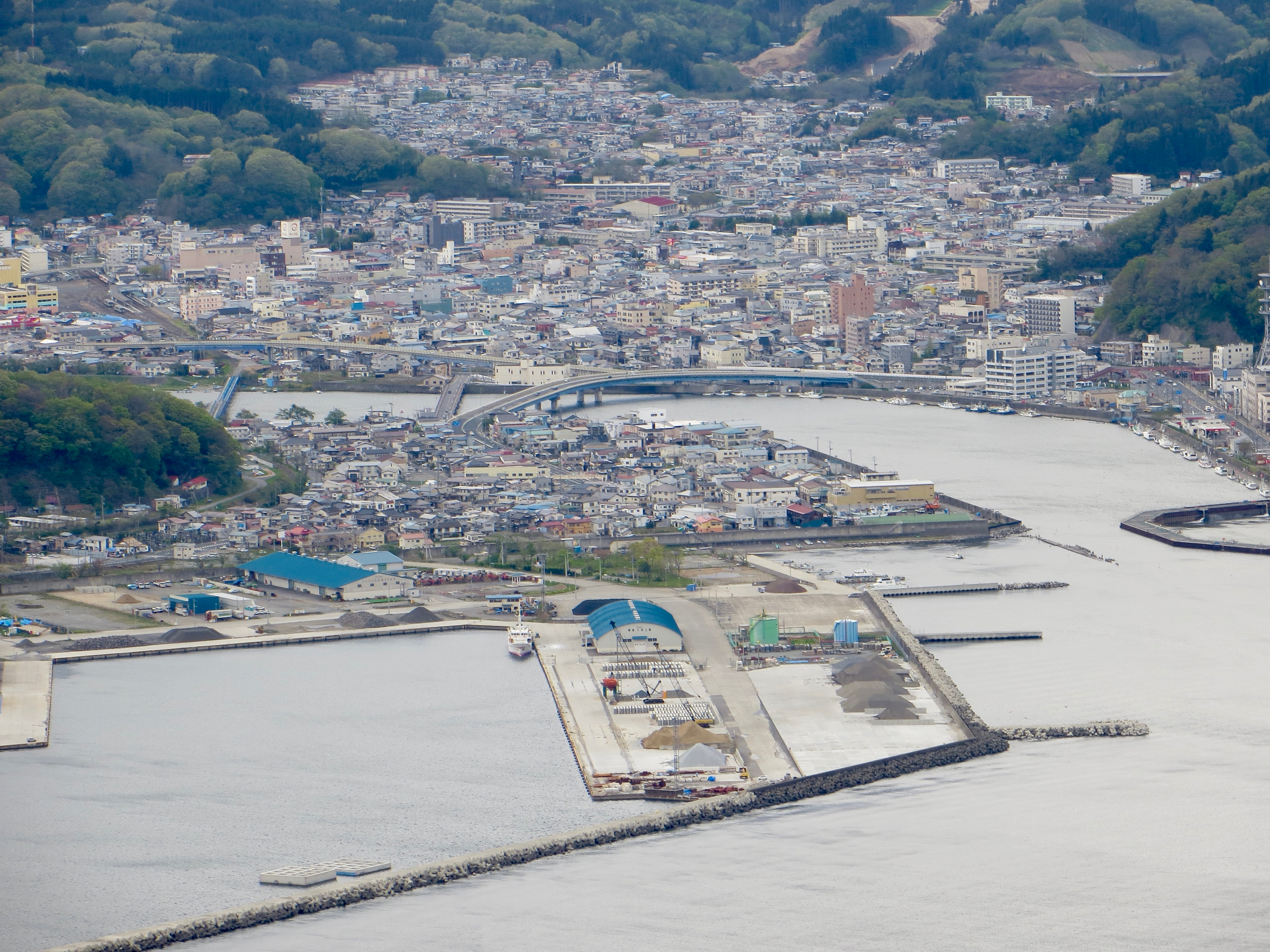
Downtown of Miyako

=== Neighboring municipalities ===
Iwate Prefecture

- Hanamaki
- Iwaizumi
- Morioka
- Ōtsuchi
- Tōno
- Yamada

== Climate ==
Miyako possesses a humid subtropical climate (Köppen climate classification Cfa) with cold winters and moderately hot and humid summers, narrowly avoiding an oceanic climate (Köppen climate classification Cfb), making it one of the only places in Japan which borders the climate classification. It also borders a hot-summer humid continental climate (Köppen climate classification Dfa).

The average annual temperature in Miyako is 10.9 °C. The average annual rainfall is 1282 mm with September as the wettest month and February as the driest month. The temperatures are highest on average in August, at around 22.1 °C which barely avoids an oceanic climate classification under the Köppen climate classification system by .1c, and lowest in January, at around 0.5 °C.

Climate data for Miyako (elevation 42.5 m, 1991–2020 normals, extremes 1883–present)
Month	Jan	Feb	Mar	Apr	May	Jun	Jul	Aug	Sep	Oct	Nov	Dec	Year
Record high °C (°F)	18.9 (66.0)	21.3 (70.3)	24.2 (75.6)	32.1 (89.8)	33.0 (91.4)	35.9 (96.6)	37.3 (99.1)	37.2 (99.0)	34.6 (94.3)	30.5 (86.9)	26.9 (80.4)	23.2 (73.8)	37.3 (99.1)
Mean maximum °C (°F)	11.5 (52.7)	13.7 (56.7)	18.7 (65.7)	24.3 (75.7)	28.3 (82.9)	30.0 (86.0)	32.6 (90.7)	33.8 (92.8)	30.9 (87.6)	25.1 (77.2)	20.6 (69.1)	14.8 (58.6)	34.3 (93.7)
Mean daily maximum °C (°F)	5.2 (41.4)	5.6 (42.1)	9.1 (48.4)	14.6 (58.3)	18.9 (66.0)	21.0 (69.8)	24.4 (75.9)	26.3 (79.3)	23.5 (74.3)	18.8 (65.8)	13.5 (56.3)	7.7 (45.9)	15.7 (60.3)
Daily mean °C (°F)	0.5 (32.9)	0.8 (33.4)	3.9 (39.0)	8.9 (48.0)	13.5 (56.3)	16.5 (61.7)	20.3 (68.5)	22.1 (71.8)	19.1 (66.4)	13.6 (56.5)	8.1 (46.6)	2.9 (37.2)	10.8 (51.4)
Mean daily minimum °C (°F)	−3.5 (25.7)	−3.5 (25.7)	−0.8 (30.6)	3.9 (39.0)	9.0 (48.2)	13.1 (55.6)	17.4 (63.3)	19.2 (66.6)	15.6 (60.1)	9.2 (48.6)	3.0 (37.4)	−1.4 (29.5)	6.8 (44.2)
Mean minimum °C (°F)	−8.3 (17.1)	−8.1 (17.4)	−5.6 (21.9)	−1.6 (29.1)	3.2 (37.8)	8.2 (46.8)	13.3 (55.9)	14.5 (58.1)	9.6 (49.3)	2.9 (37.2)	−2.2 (28.0)	−5.8 (21.6)	−9.1 (15.6)
Record low °C (°F)	−17.3 (0.9)	−15.1 (4.8)	−14.6 (5.7)	−7.3 (18.9)	−1.5 (29.3)	1.6 (34.9)	4.9 (40.8)	9.6 (49.3)	3.7 (38.7)	−2.9 (26.8)	−7.0 (19.4)	−13.4 (7.9)	−17.3 (0.9)
Average precipitation mm (inches)	63.4 (2.50)	54.7 (2.15)	87.5 (3.44)	91.9 (3.62)	98.1 (3.86)	123.4 (4.86)	157.5 (6.20)	177.9 (7.00)	216.4 (8.52)	166.1 (6.54)	62.8 (2.47)	67.6 (2.66)	1,367.3 (53.82)
Average snowfall cm (inches)	20 (7.9)	33 (13)	28 (11)	2 (0.8)	0 (0)	0 (0)	0 (0)	0 (0)	0 (0)	0 (0)	0 (0)	9 (3.5)	91 (36)
Average precipitation days (≥ 0.5 mm)	5.4	6.0	8.2	9.2	10.6	11.1	13.6	12.4	12.1	9.0	6.4	5.5	109.4
Average snowy days (≥ 1 cm)	4.7	5.6	4.0	0.5	0.0	0.0	0.0	0.0	0.0	0.0	0.1	1.8	16.5
Average relative humidity (%)	60	62	63	66	74	84	88	87	85	78	69	63	73
Mean monthly sunshine hours	158.4	153.2	179.7	186.6	185.0	152.6	133.9	153.2	133.8	149.6	146.8	147.6	1,876.2
Source: Japan Meteorological Agency

Climate data for Kawai, Miyako (elevation 192 m, 1991–2020 normals, extremes 1977–present)
Month	Jan	Feb	Mar	Apr	May	Jun	Jul	Aug	Sep	Oct	Nov	Dec	Year
Record high °C (°F)	14.6 (58.3)	18.6 (65.5)	21.7 (71.1)	29.9 (85.8)	34.3 (93.7)	35.4 (95.7)	37.6 (99.7)	37.5 (99.5)	35.1 (95.2)	29.3 (84.7)	25.2 (77.4)	20.9 (69.6)	37.6 (99.7)
Mean daily maximum °C (°F)	2.9 (37.2)	3.8 (38.8)	8.0 (46.4)	14.8 (58.6)	20.5 (68.9)	23.5 (74.3)	26.8 (80.2)	28.0 (82.4)	24.1 (75.4)	18.3 (64.9)	12.3 (54.1)	5.7 (42.3)	15.8 (60.4)
Daily mean °C (°F)	−1.1 (30.0)	−0.6 (30.9)	2.9 (37.2)	8.7 (47.7)	14.1 (57.4)	17.8 (64.0)	21.5 (70.7)	22.4 (72.3)	18.4 (65.1)	12.2 (54.0)	6.6 (43.9)	1.4 (34.5)	10.4 (50.7)
Mean daily minimum °C (°F)	−4.9 (23.2)	−4.8 (23.4)	−1.8 (28.8)	3.0 (37.4)	8.3 (46.9)	13.0 (55.4)	17.5 (63.5)	18.4 (65.1)	14.4 (57.9)	7.5 (45.5)	1.7 (35.1)	−2.3 (27.9)	5.9 (42.6)
Record low °C (°F)	−15.4 (4.3)	−17.7 (0.1)	−12.4 (9.7)	−5.0 (23.0)	−1.5 (29.3)	1.7 (35.1)	8.6 (47.5)	8.8 (47.8)	2.5 (36.5)	−2.3 (27.9)	−6.7 (19.9)	−12.6 (9.3)	−17.7 (0.1)
Average precipitation mm (inches)	46.0 (1.81)	40.7 (1.60)	74.9 (2.95)	85.1 (3.35)	94.0 (3.70)	104.9 (4.13)	158.8 (6.25)	176.7 (6.96)	168.1 (6.62)	131.3 (5.17)	70.6 (2.78)	61.0 (2.40)	1,212.1 (47.72)
Average precipitation days (≥ 1.0 mm)	7.1	6.5	9.4	10.2	10.7	9.4	12.6	11.3	12.0	9.4	9.4	8.0	115.7
Mean monthly sunshine hours	122.1	124.8	158.2	183.0	199.0	168.9	148.3	155.0	132.1	141.9	127.0	112.2	1,772.5
Source: Japan Meteorological Agency

Climate data for Kuzakai, Miyako (elevation 734 m, 1993–2020 normals (snowfall 1991–2020), extremes 1993–present)
Month	Jan	Feb	Mar	Apr	May	Jun	Jul	Aug	Sep	Oct	Nov	Dec	Year
Record high °C (°F)	8.0 (46.4)	12.7 (54.9)	15.5 (59.9)	24.0 (75.2)	28.6 (83.5)	28.0 (82.4)	30.9 (87.6)	31.6 (88.9)	28.6 (83.5)	23.4 (74.1)	19.9 (67.8)	14.0 (57.2)	31.6 (88.9)
Mean daily maximum °C (°F)	−2.7 (27.1)	−1.6 (29.1)	2.3 (36.1)	9.5 (49.1)	16.1 (61.0)	19.7 (67.5)	23.1 (73.6)	24.1 (75.4)	19.9 (67.8)	13.6 (56.5)	6.9 (44.4)	0.3 (32.5)	10.9 (51.6)
Daily mean °C (°F)	−6.1 (21.0)	−5.4 (22.3)	−1.8 (28.8)	4.5 (40.1)	10.7 (51.3)	14.8 (58.6)	19.0 (66.2)	19.8 (67.6)	15.5 (59.9)	8.8 (47.8)	2.8 (37.0)	−3.0 (26.6)	6.6 (43.9)
Mean daily minimum °C (°F)	−11.2 (11.8)	−10.8 (12.6)	−7.1 (19.2)	−0.9 (30.4)	4.7 (40.5)	9.7 (49.5)	15.3 (59.5)	15.8 (60.4)	11.1 (52.0)	3.5 (38.3)	−2.1 (28.2)	−7.4 (18.7)	1.7 (35.1)
Record low °C (°F)	−24.1 (−11.4)	−22.9 (−9.2)	−20.3 (−4.5)	−11.5 (11.3)	−4.3 (24.3)	0.4 (32.7)	4.7 (40.5)	2.7 (36.9)	−1.6 (29.1)	−6.8 (19.8)	−13.5 (7.7)	−18.9 (−2.0)	−24.1 (−11.4)
Average precipitation mm (inches)	59.3 (2.33)	48.6 (1.91)	98.2 (3.87)	111.1 (4.37)	127.6 (5.02)	130.7 (5.15)	218.7 (8.61)	208.8 (8.22)	177.3 (6.98)	133.5 (5.26)	112.9 (4.44)	89.4 (3.52)	1,516.1 (59.68)
Average snowfall cm (inches)	142 (56)	134 (53)	125 (49)	33 (13)	0 (0)	0 (0)	0 (0)	0 (0)	0 (0)	0 (0)	21 (8.3)	114 (45)	571 (225)
Average precipitation days (≥ 1.0 mm)	13.8	12.2	14.8	13.3	13.1	11.8	15.6	13.6	13.8	13.3	14.9	15.0	165.2
Mean monthly sunshine hours	64.0	75.1	107.2	146.4	174.3	148.9	121.9	139.8	123.7	132.8	100.0	64.2	1,398.3
Source: Japan Meteorological Agency

== Demographics ==
Per Japanese census data, the population of Miyako peaked in around the year 1960 and has declined steadily over the past 60 years.

Historical population
Year	Pop.	±%
1920	44,635	—
1930	53,366	+19.6%
1940	70,318	+31.8%
1950	55,744	−20.7%
1960	81,093	+45.5%
1970	79,805	−1.6%
1980	78,617	−1.5%
1990	72,538	−7.7%
2000	66,986	−7.7%
2010	59,442	−11.3%
2020	50,369	−15.3%

== History ==
The area of present-day Miyako was part of ancient Mutsu Province, and has been settled since at least the Jōmon period. The area was inhabited by the Emishi people, and came under the control of the imperial dynasty during the early Heian period with the construction a fortified settlement on the coast. During the Muromachi period, the area came under the control of the Nambu clan, and was the main seaport for Morioka Domain during the Edo period under the Tokugawa shogunate.

On 27 January 1700, the coast of Miyako was hit by a 3-meter-tall (9.8 ft) tsunami that was a product of the 1700 Cascadia earthquake, destroying 20 homes. The record from Miyako helped provide an exact date for the earthquake.

During the Boshin War of the Meiji Restoration, the Battle of Miyako Bay was one of the major naval engagements of the war.

Under the Meiji period establishment of the modern municipalities system, the towns of Miyako and Kuwagasaki were established within Higashihei District. The area was devastated by a 18.9-meter-tall (62 ft) tsunami in 1896, which killed 1,859 inhabitants. Higashihei District became part of Shimohei District on 1 April 1897. Miyako and Kuwagasaki merged on 1 April 1924. On 3 March 1933, much of the town was destroyed by the 1933 Sanriku earthquake, which killed 911 people and destroyed over 98% of the buildings in the town. Miyako attained city status on 20 June 1940.

On 6 June 2005, Miyako absorbed the town of Tarō, and the village of Niisato, more than doubling the old city's size. On 1 January 2010, Miyako absorbed the village of Kawai (also from Shimohei District).

=== 2011 Tōhoku earthquake and tsunami ===
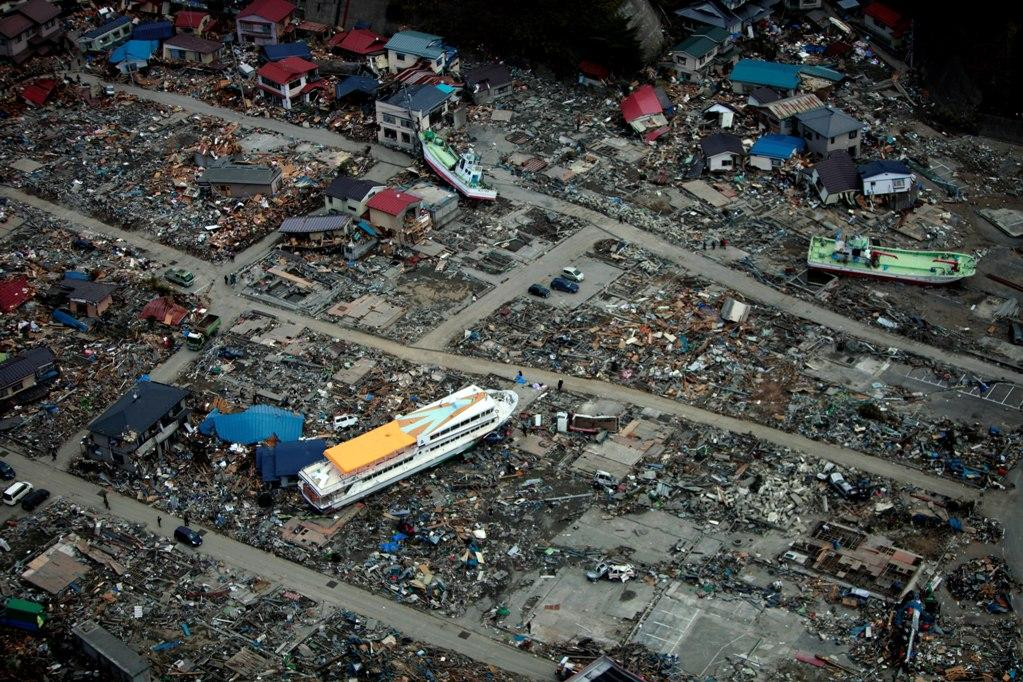
A large ferry boat rests inland amidst destroyed houses after a 9.0 earthquake and subsequent tsunami struck

On 11 March 2011, Miyako was devastated by a tsunami caused by the 2011 Tōhoku earthquake. Only about 30–60 boats survived from the town's 960-ship fishing fleet. A subsequent field study by the University of Tokyo's Earthquake Research Institute revealed that the waters had reached at least 37.9 meters (124 ft) above sea level, almost equaling the 38.2 meters (125 ft) record of the tsunami created by the 1896 Sanriku earthquake. The final reported death toll from the disaster for the Miyako region was 420 confirmed dead, 92 missing, and 4,005 buildings destroyed.

Some of the most iconic footage of the tsunami, repeatedly broadcast worldwide, was shot in Miyako. It shows a dark black wave cresting and overflowing a floodwall and tossing cars, followed by a fishing ship capsizing as it hit the submerged floodwall and then crushed as it was forced beneath a bridge.

== Government ==
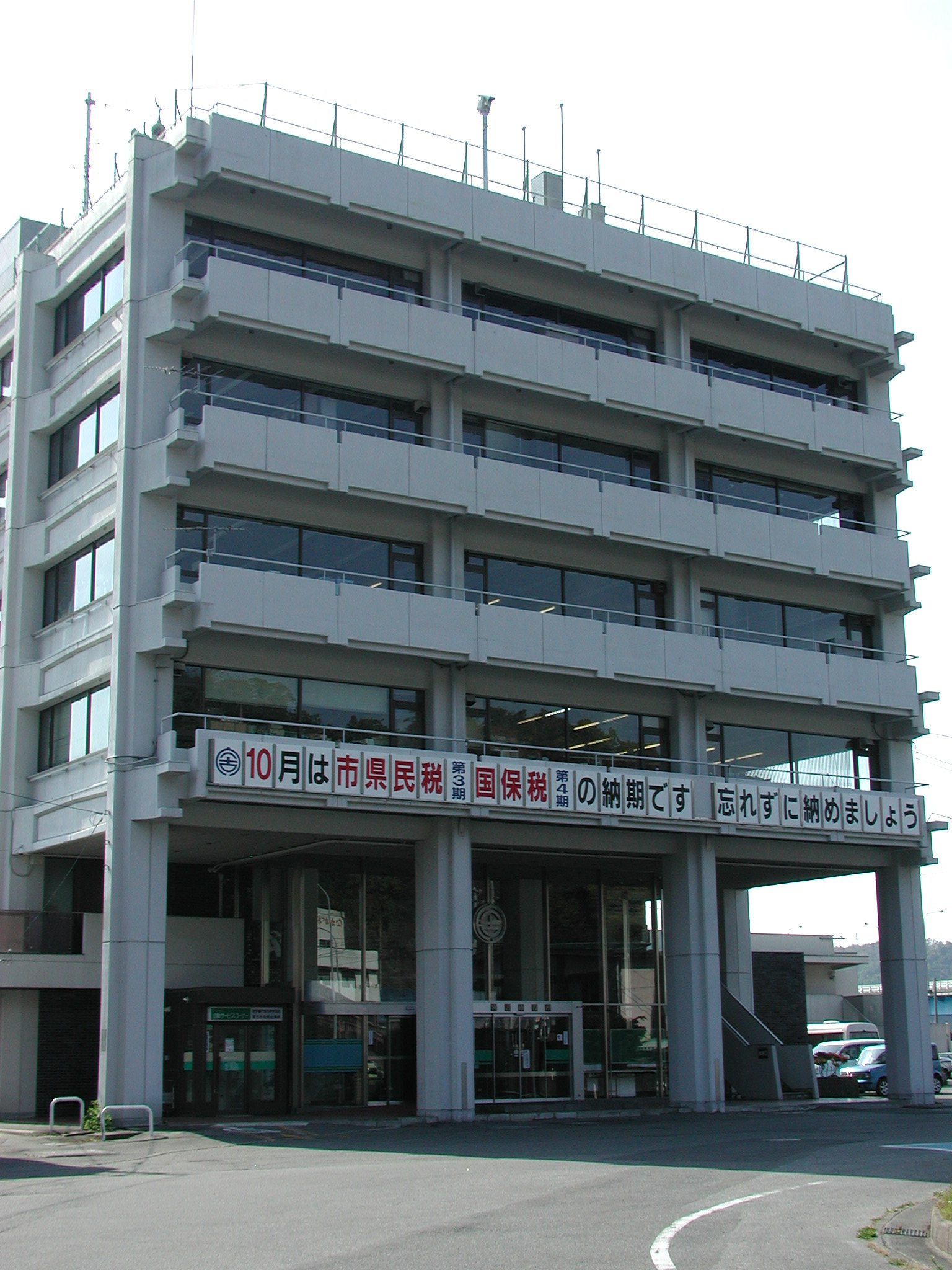
Former Miyako City Hall

Miyako has a mayor-council form of government with a directly elected mayor and a unicameral city legislature of 28 members. Miyako, together with the town of Iwaizumi and the villages of Fudai, Tanohata, and Yamada, collectively contributes three seats to the Iwate Prefectural legislature. In terms of national politics, the village is part of Iwate 2nd district of the lower house of the Diet of Japan.

== Economy ==
The local economy of Miyako is based heavily on commercial fishing and food processing.

== Education ==
=== Colleges ===
- Miyako Junior College

=== Primary and secondary education ===
- Miyako has 21 public elementary schools and 11 public junior high schools operated by the city government. The city has five public high schools operated by the Iwate Prefectural Board of Education and one private high school. Iwate Prefecture also operates one special education school for the handicapped.

== Transportation ==
=== Railway ===
East Japan Railway Company (JR East) - Yamada Line

- Kuzakai - Matsukusa - Hiratsuto - Kawauchi - Hakoishi - Rikuchū-Kawai - Haratai - Moichi - Hikime - Kebaraichi - Sentoku - Miyako

Sanriku Railway – Rias Line

- Haraigawa - Sokei - Yagisawa Miyakotandai - Tsugaruishi - Miyako - Yamaguchi Danchi - Ichinowatari - Sabane - Tarō - Settai

=== Highway ===
- Sanriku Expressway
- Sanriku-kita Jūkan Road
- National Route 45
- National Route 106
- National Route 340

=== Port ===
- Port of Miyako

== Local attractions ==
- Cape Todo
- Jōdogahama, National Place of Scenic Beauty
- Mount Hayachine, one of the 100 Famous Japanese Mountains
- Sakiyama Shell Mound, a Jōmon-period National Historic Site
- Sanriku Fukkō National Park

== International relations ==
- Yantai, Shandong province, China, friendship city since April 1, 1966
- La Trinidad, Benguet, Philippines, friendship city since August 7, 1992

== Noted people from Miyako ==
- Toshio Fujiwara, kick-boxer
- Nobutoshi Hikage, judoka
- Mirai Maiumi, professional wrestler
- Tokuichiro Tamazawa, politician

== In popular media ==
- Miyako was a filming location for Times of Joy and Sorrow starring Hideko Takamine and Keiji Sada in 1957.
- Miyako was the hometown of the heroine from the 2022 anime film Suzume. A door similar to one featured in the film was set up as a pilgrimage destination for fans.
