= Cape Todo =

Easternmost point of the island of Honshu in Japan

Cape Todo とどヶ崎
- Cape
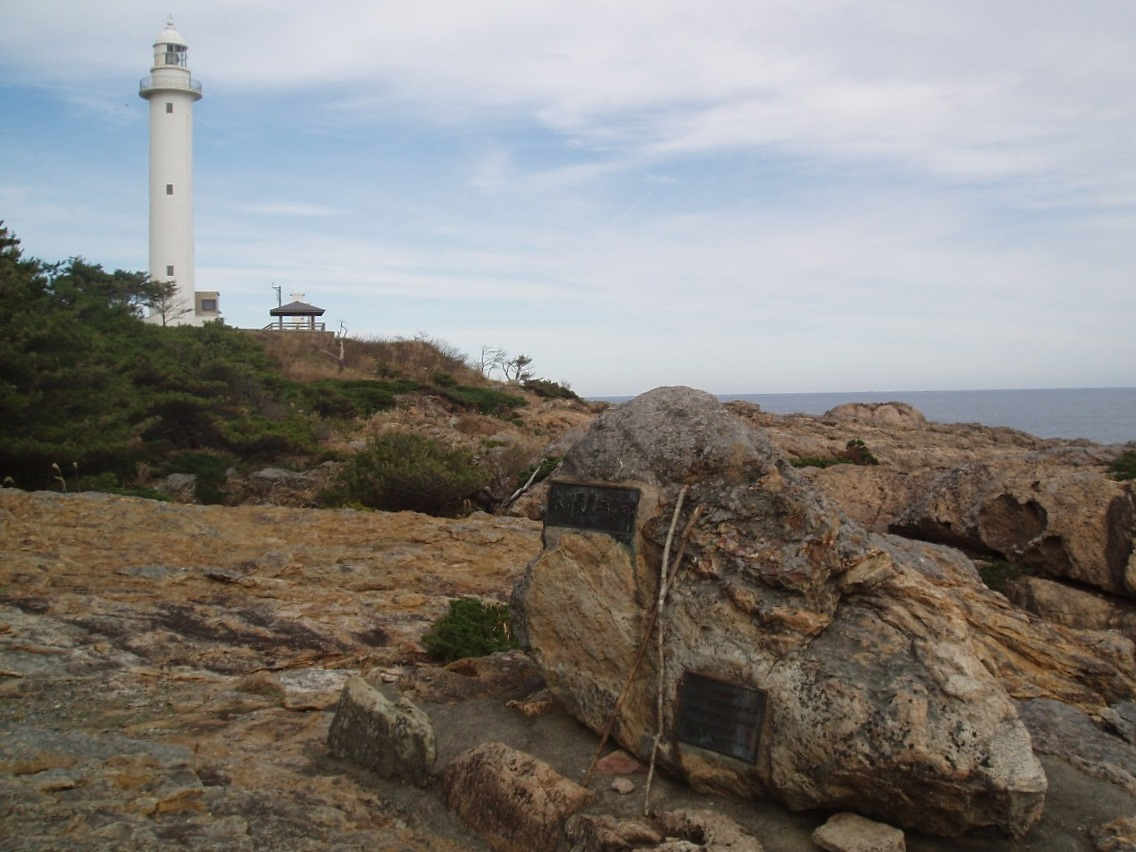
- Todosaki and Todosaki Lighthouse, Miyako, Iwate, Japan

- Location of Todosaki in Iwate Prefecture Cape Todo (Japan)
- Coordinates: 39°32′52.6″N 142°04′20.7″E
- Location: Miyako, Iwate, Japan

Cape Todo (とどヶ崎, Todogasaki), also written as "魹ヶ崎" is the easternmost point of the island of Honshu in Japan. It is located within the borders of the city of Miyako, Iwate, and is part of the Sanriku Fukkō National Park. Although referred to as a "cape", the area is not clearly a peninsula extending into the Pacific Ocean, but is simply the easternmost point on a coastline.

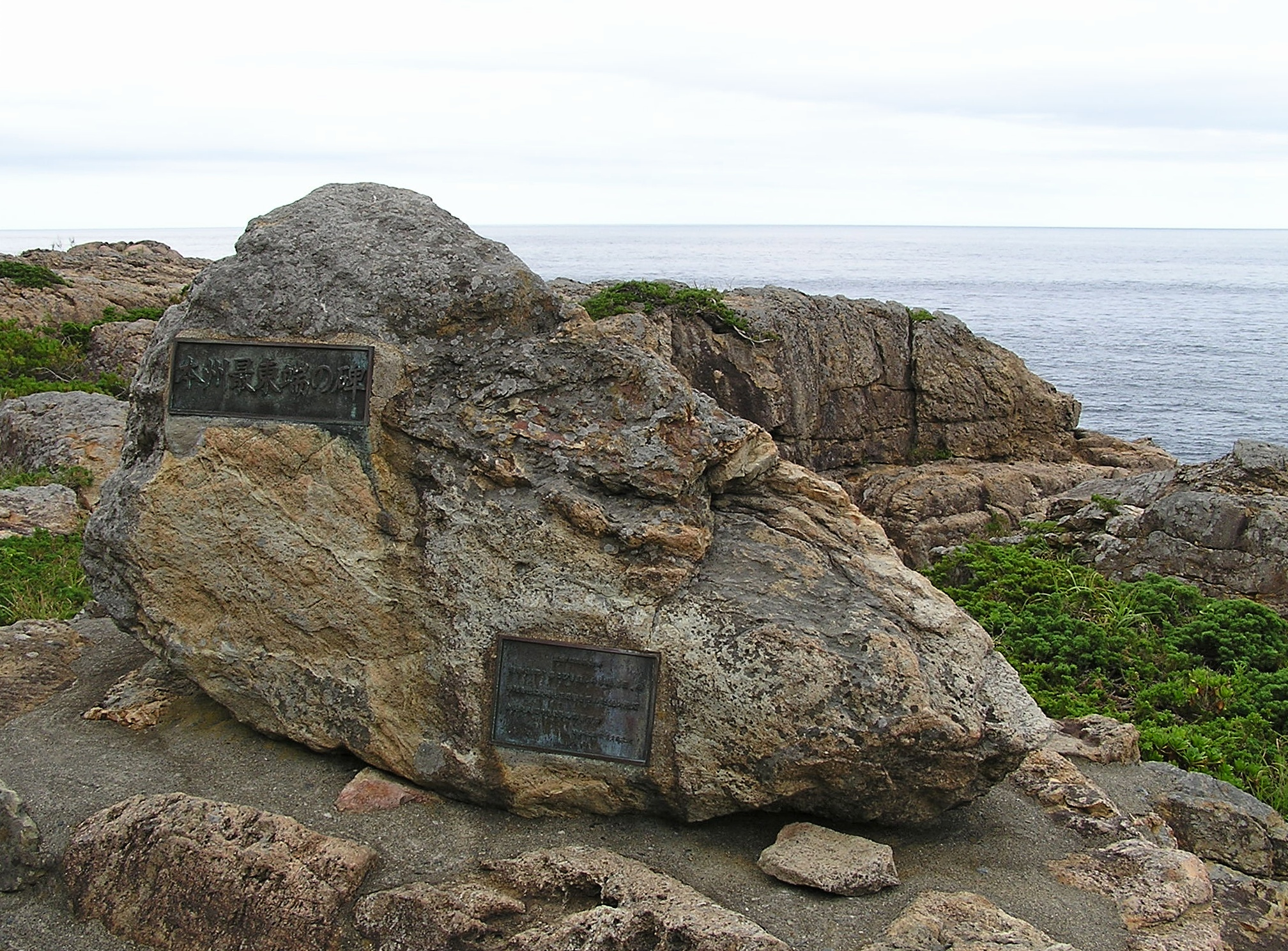
Monument indicating the easternmost point on Honshu
