= Kamiyonai Station =

Railway station in Morioka, Iwate Prefecture, Japan

Kamiyonai Station 上米内駅
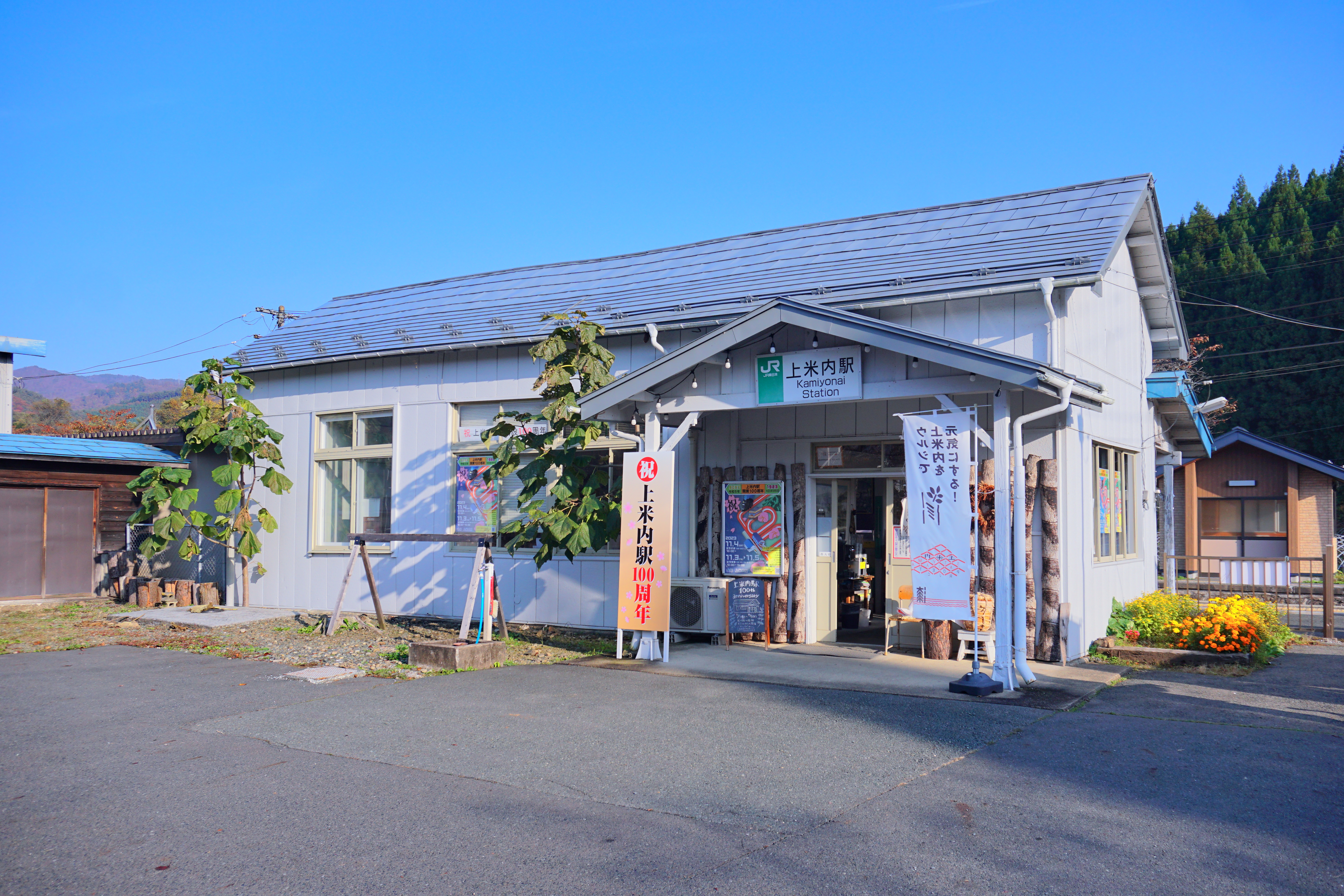
- Kamiyonai Station in November 2023

General information
- Location: 20-2 Kamiyonai-Nakaya, Morioka-shi, Iwate-ken 020–0001; Japan
- Coordinates: 39.7441°N 141.2040°E
- Operator: JR East
- Line: ■ Yamada Line
- Distance: 9.9 km from Morioka
- Platforms: 2 side platforms
- Tracks: 2

Other information
- Website: www.jreast.co.jp/estation/station/info.aspx?StationCd=504

History
- Opened: 10 October 1923

Passengers
- FY2015: 76 daily

Services
Preceding station	JR East	Following station
Yamagishi towards Morioka	Yamada Line Rapid Rias	Rikuchū-Kawai towards Miyako
Yamagishi towards Morioka	Yamada Line Local	Kuzakai towards Miyako
Location
- Location within Japan

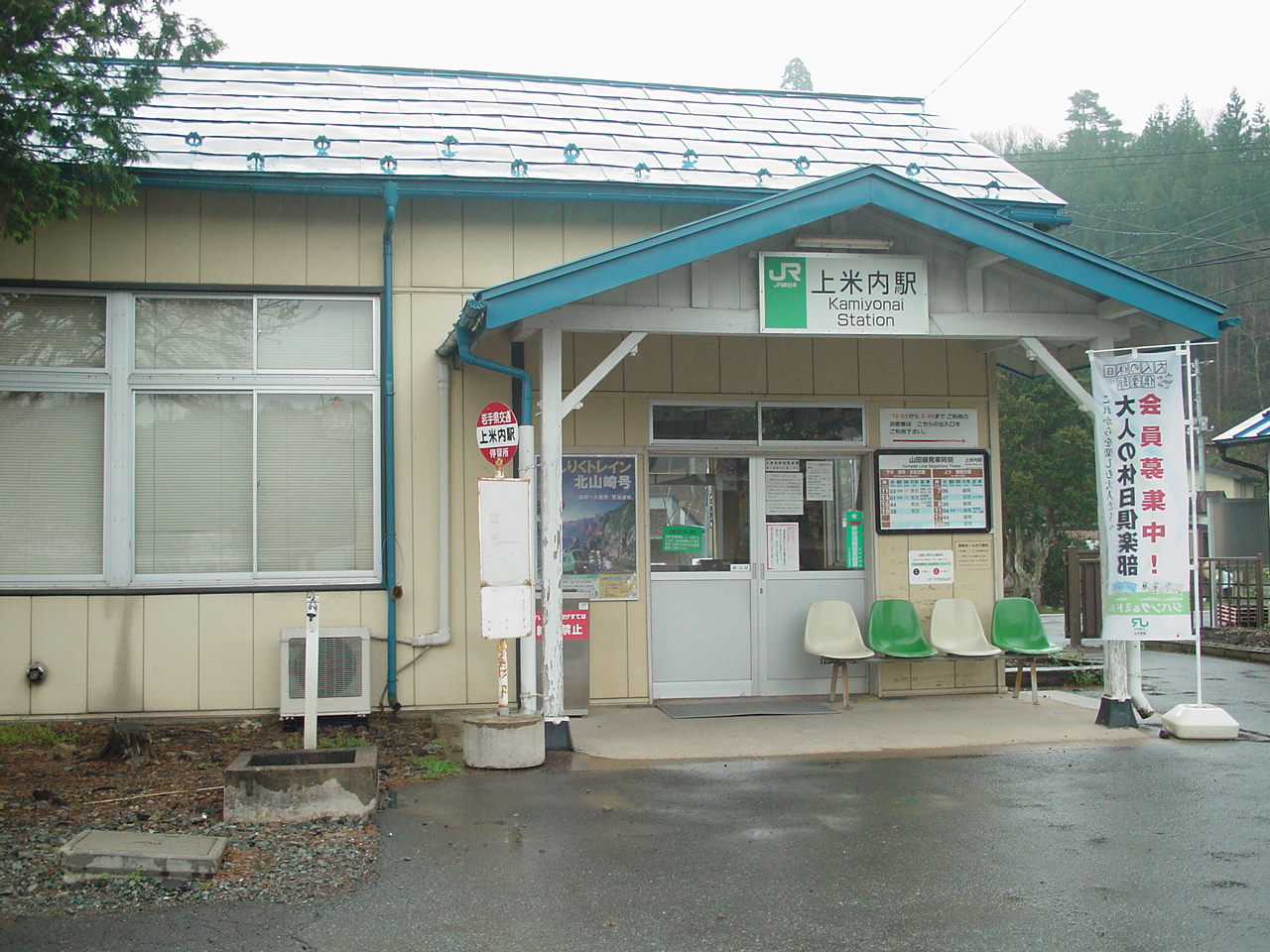
Kamiyonai Station in May 2007

Kamiyonai Station (上米内駅, Kamiyonai-eki) is a railway station on the Yamada Line in the city of Morioka, Iwate, Japan, operated by East Japan Railway Company (JR East).

== Lines ==
Kamiyonai Station is served by the Yamada Line, and is located 9.9 kilometers from the terminus of the line at Morioka Station.

== Station layout ==
Kamiyonai Station has two opposed side platforms connected to the station building by a level crossing. The station is staffed.

=== Platforms ===
1	■ Yamada Line	for Moichi, Miyako for Morioka (starting trains and after 13:50)
2	■ Yamada Line	for Morioka (until 13:50)

== History ==
Kamiyonai Station opened on 10 October 1923. The station was absorbed into the JR East network upon the privatization of the Japanese National Railways (JNR) on 1 April 1987.

== Passenger statistics ==
In fiscal 2015, the station was used by an average of 76 passengers daily (boarding passengers only).

== Surrounding area ==
- National Route 455

== See also ==
- List of railway stations in Japan
