= Japan National Route 106 =

National highway in Iwate Prefecture, Japan

National Route 106
- 国道106号
- Miyako–Morioka Connector (宮古盛岡横断道路, Miyako–Morioka Ōdandōro)
- National Route 106 highlighted in red
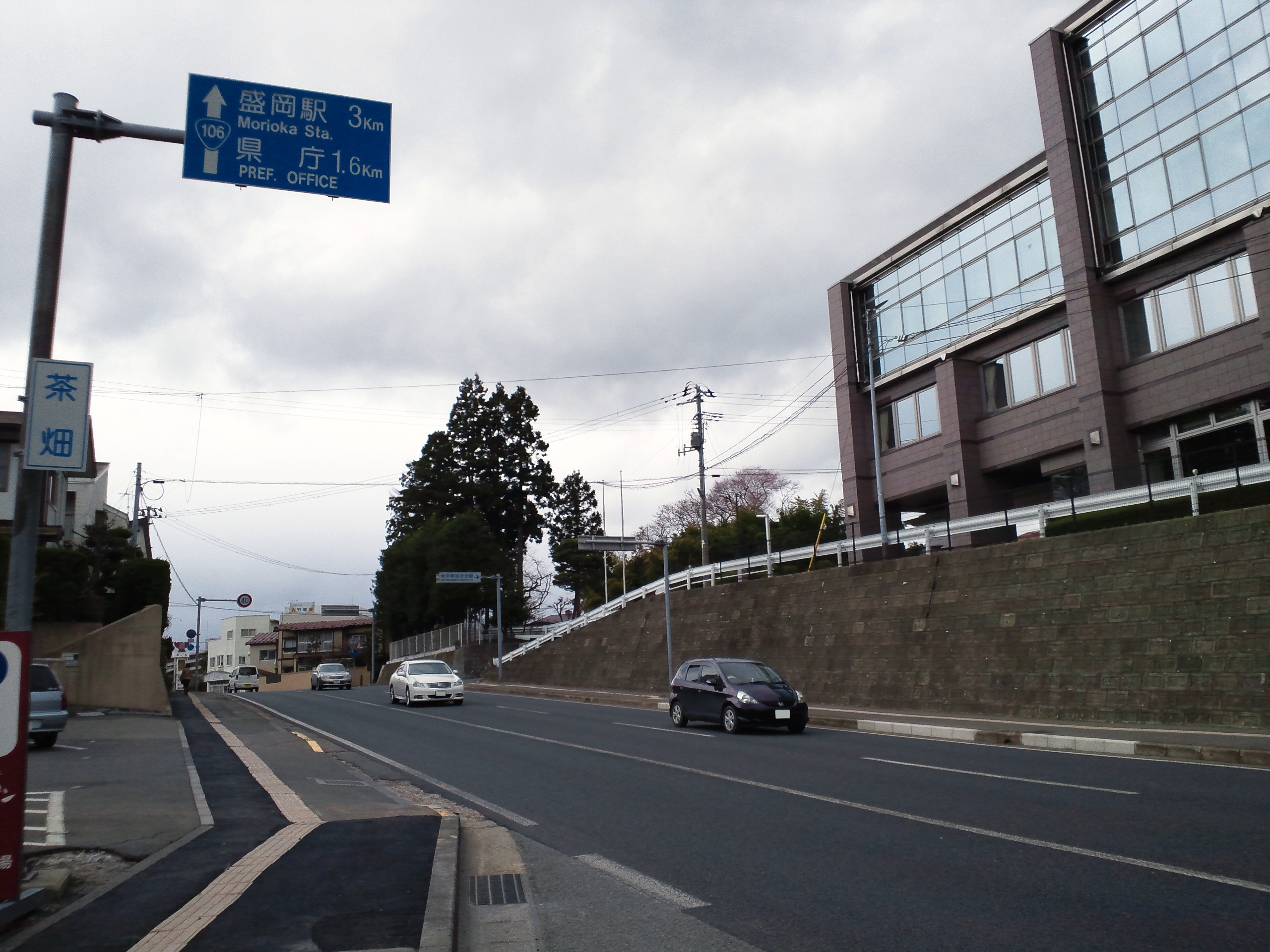

Route information
- Length: 92.4 km (57.4 mi)
- Existed: 1953–present

Major junctions
- East end: National Route 45 in Miyako
- Sanriku Expressway; National Route 340; National Route 4
- West end: National Route 455 in Morioka

Location
- Country: Japan

Highway system
- National highways of Japan; Expressways of Japan
← National Route 105	→ National Route 107

National Route 106 (国道106号, Kokudō Hyaku-rokugō) is a national highway of Japan that connects the cities of Miyako and Morioka in Iwate Prefecture. As of June 2020, it has a total length of 92.4 kilometers (57.4 mi), though the highway is in the process of being upgraded to the Miyako–Morioka Connector (宮古盛岡横断道路, Miyako–Morioka Ōdandōro), which will follow a shorter route than the older highway. It is paralleled for most of its length by JR East's Yamada Line.

== Route description ==
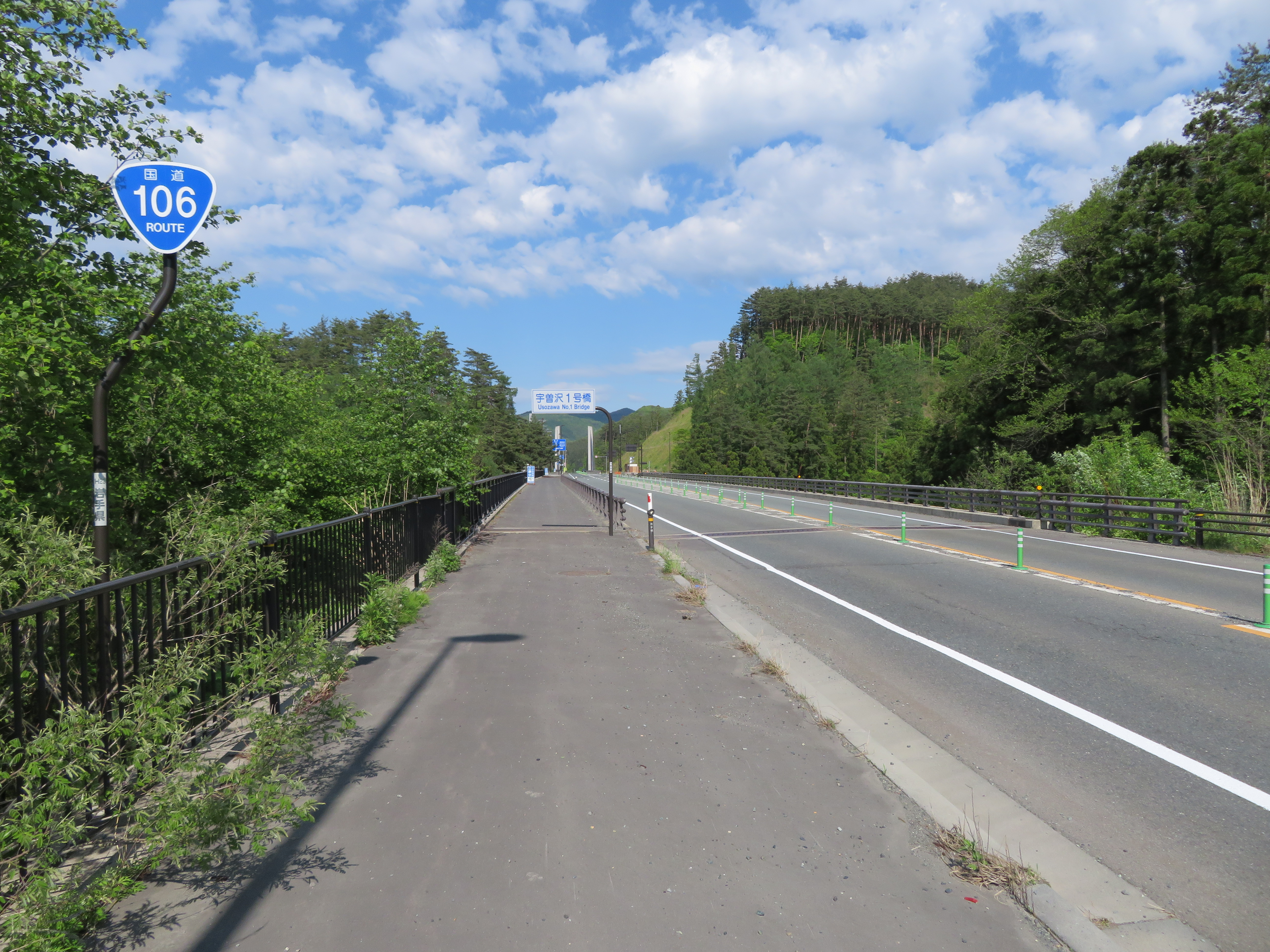
National Route 106 in Morioka

National Route 106 is one of the primary west-east highways in Iwate Prefecture and the main route between the cities of Miyako on the Pacific coast and Morioka in the prefecture's interior plains. It carries traffic across the Kitakami Mountains that separate the two cities. The highway has a total length of 92.4 kilometers (57.4 mi).

== History ==
What would eventually become National Route 106 was the 宮古街道 (Miyako Kaidō), a road linking Morioka and Miyako that was established in 1881. Work began in 1963 to upgrade the Miyako Kaidō to National Route 106 after the route was designated as Secondary National Route 106 in 1953. The secondary route designation was merged with the primary routes in 1963. The upgrades to the route were completed in 1978

After the 2011 Tōhoku earthquake and tsunami, plans were created to streamline the highway's route by a series of tunnels and bridges through the Kitakami Mountains between Miyako and Morioka. Some sections will be upgraded to expressway standards as the highway is rebuilt.

== List of major junctions and features ==
The route lies entirely within Iwate Prefecture.

Location	km	mi	Destinations	Notes
Miyako	0.0	0.0	National Route 45 – Kamaishi, Kuji, Central Miyako, Jōdogahama, Fishery museum	Eastern terminus
Miyako	4.1	2.5	Iwate Prefecture Route 40 north – Central Miyako, Miyako Station; Miyako Road – Sanriku Expressway	
Miyako	4.9	3.0	Iwate Prefecture Route 200 south – Hanawa	
Miyako	6.5	4.0	Miyakonishi Road east – to Sanriku Expressway	Interchange
Miyako	16.8	10.4	Iwate Prefecture Route 115 west – Moichi Station	
Miyako	16.9	10.5	National Route 340 north – Iwaizumi	Eastern end of National Route 340 concurrency
Miyako	31.0	19.3	Iwate Prefecture Route 143 south – Rikuchū-Kawai Station	
Miyako	32.4	20.1	National Route 340 south – Tōno, Ōtsuchi	Western end of National Route 340 concurrency
Miyako	41.5	25.8	Iwate Prefecture Route 142 south – Kawauchi Station	Partial interchange
Miyako	58.7	36.5	Iwate Prefecture Route 171 north – Iwaizumi	
Morioka	79.1	49.2	Iwate Prefecture Route 43 south – Nagano Pass, Nedamo	
Morioka	81.4	50.6	Tonan-Kawame Road west – Kawame	Kawame Interchange
Morioka	82.8	51.4	Iwate Prefecture Route 36 north – Tsunatori Dam	Eastern end of Iwate Prefecture Route 36 concurrency
Morioka	84.3	52.4	Iwate Prefecture Route 36 south – to Tōhoku Expressway, National Route 396, Tōno	Western end of Iwate Prefecture Route 36 concurrency
Morioka	89.6	55.7	National Route 4 (Morioka Bypass) – to Tōhoku Expressway, National Route 46, Hanamaki, Ninohe, Akita	
Morioka	92.4	57.4	National Route 455 east (Chūō-dōri) – Morioka Station, Iwate Prefecture Office	Western terminus
1.000 mi = 1.609 km; 1.000 km = 0.621 mi: Concurrency terminus
