= Miyako Station =

Railway station in Miyako, Iwate Prefecture, Japan

Miyako Station 宮古駅
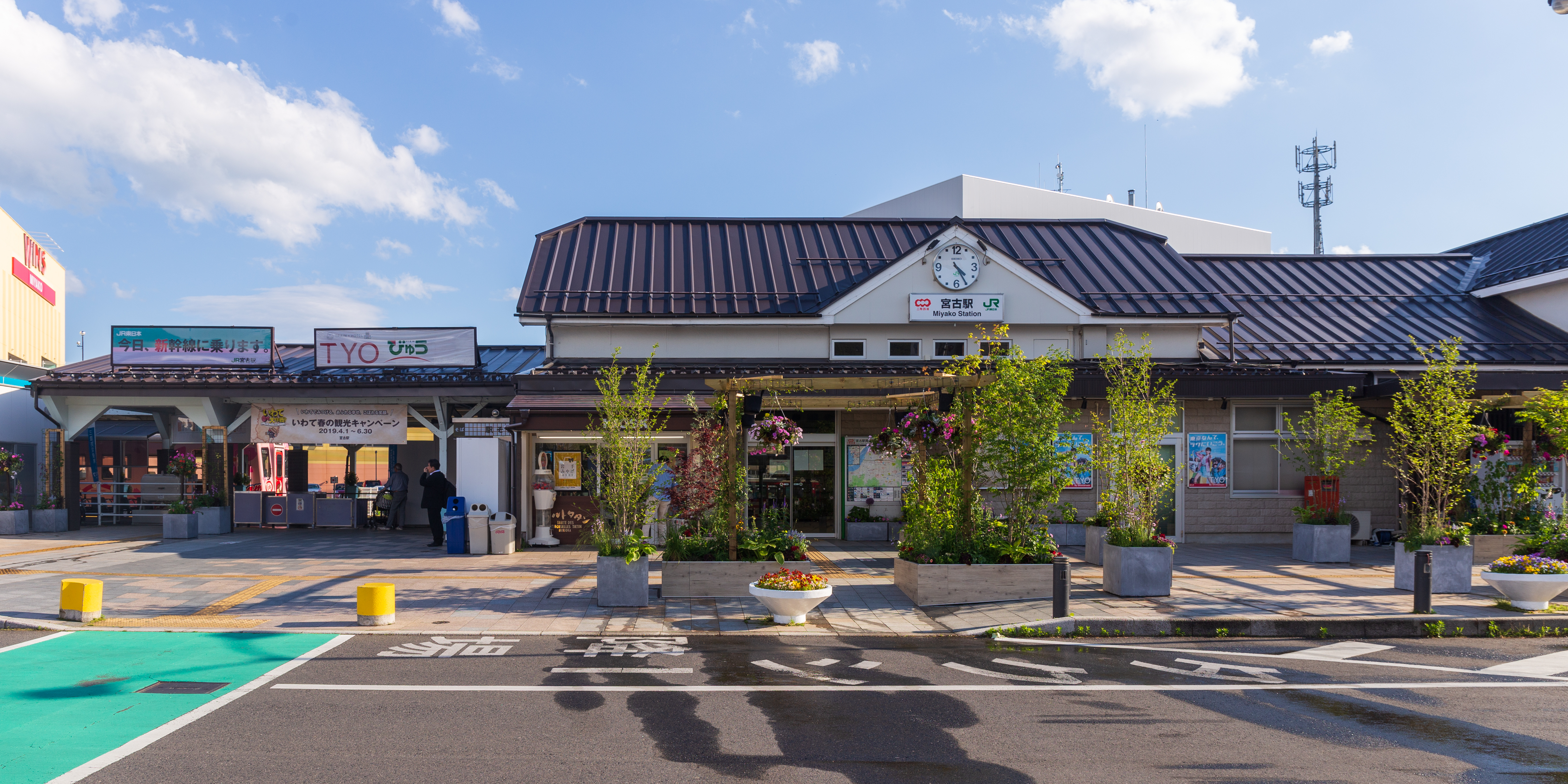
- JR Miyako Station in June 2019

General information
- Location: 1-1-80 Miyamachi, Miyako-shi, Iwate-ken 027-0052; Japan
- Coordinates: 39°38′24″N 141°56′51″E
- Operator: JR East; Sanriku Railway
- Lines: ■ Yamada Line; ■ Rias Line
- Distance: 102.1 km from Morioka; 92.0 km from Sakari
- Platforms: 2 island platform
- Tracks: 3
- Connections: Bus

Construction
- Structure type: At grade

Other information
- Status: Staffed (Midori no Madoguchi)
- Website: Official website

History
- Opened: 8 November 1934

Passengers
- FY2015: 299 (JR East); 247 (Sanriku) daily

Services
Preceding station	JR East	Following station
Moichi towards Morioka	Yamada Line Rapid Rias; Local	Terminus
Preceding station	Sanriku Railway	Following station
Sokei towards Sakari	Rias Line	Yamaguchi Danchi towards Kuji
Location
- Location within Japan

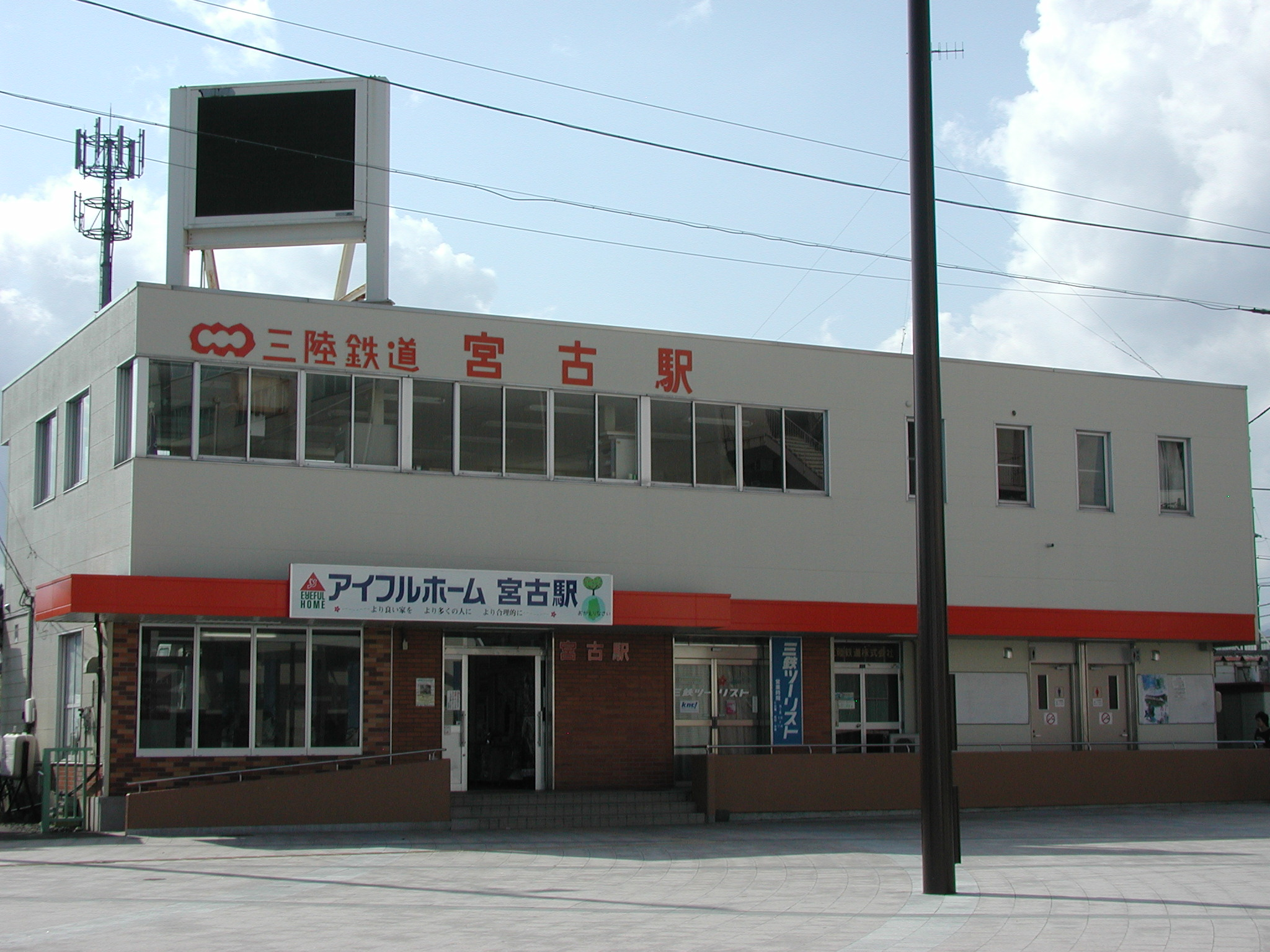
The old Sanriku Miyako Station

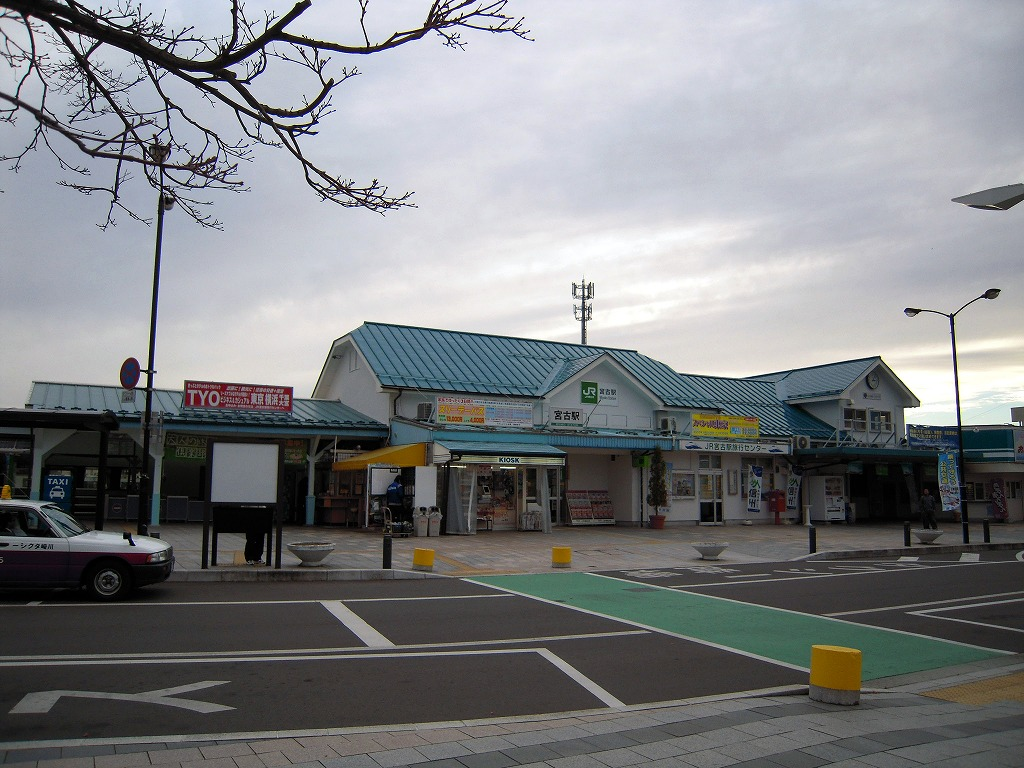
The old JR Miyako Station

Miyako Station (宮古駅, Miyako-eki) is a railway station in the city of Miyako, Iwate, Japan, operated by the Sanriku Railway.

== Lines ==
Miyako Station is a terminal station on the Yamada Line, and is located 102.1 kilometers from the opposing terminus of the line at Morioka Station. It is also a station for the Sanriku Railway's Rias Line, and was located 92.0 rail kilometers from the terminus of the line at Sakari Station.

== Station layout ==
Miyako Station has two island platforms connected to the station building by a footbridge. The station has a Midori no Madoguchi staffed ticket office.

=== Platforms ===
0	■ Rias Line	for Kuji
1	■ Rias Line	for Kamaishi and Sakari
1	■ Rias Line	for Kuji
2	■ Rias Line	for Kuji
3	■ Yamada Line	for Morioka

== History ==
Miyako Station opened on 8 November 1934. The station became a terminal station for the Miyako Line on 27 February 1972. This line was privatized on 1 April 1987, becoming the Sanriku Railway Kita-Rias Line. Miyako Station was absorbed into the JR East network upon the privatization of the Japanese National Railways (JNR) on 1 April 1987. The 2011 Tōhoku earthquake and tsunami on 11 March 2011 destroyed much of the tracks and many stations between Miyako and Kamaishi. In February 2012, JR East officially proposed that this section of the line be scrapped and the right-of-way used as a bus rapid transit (BRT) route. Afterwards, this decision was reversed, and as of 2018 the Yamada Line have been reconstructed between Miyako and Kamaishi. On 23 March 2019, it reopened and be transferred to Sanriku Railway, resulting in a one-seat ride between Kuji and Ofunato. The reconstructed segment joined up with the Kita-Rias Line on one side and the Minami-Rias Line on the other which together constitutes the entire Rias Line. At the same time, Miyako station is also transferred to Sanriku Railway.

== Passenger statistics ==
In fiscal 2015, the JR East portion of the station was used by an average of 299 passenger daily (boarding passengers only). The Sanriku Railway portion of the station was used by 247 passengers during the same period.

== Surrounding area ==
- Miyako Post Office
- Jōdogahama

== See also ==
- List of railway stations in Japan
