= Iwaizumi-Omoto Station =

Railway station in Iwaizumi, Iwate Prefecture, Japan

Iwaizumi-Omoto Station 岩泉小本駅
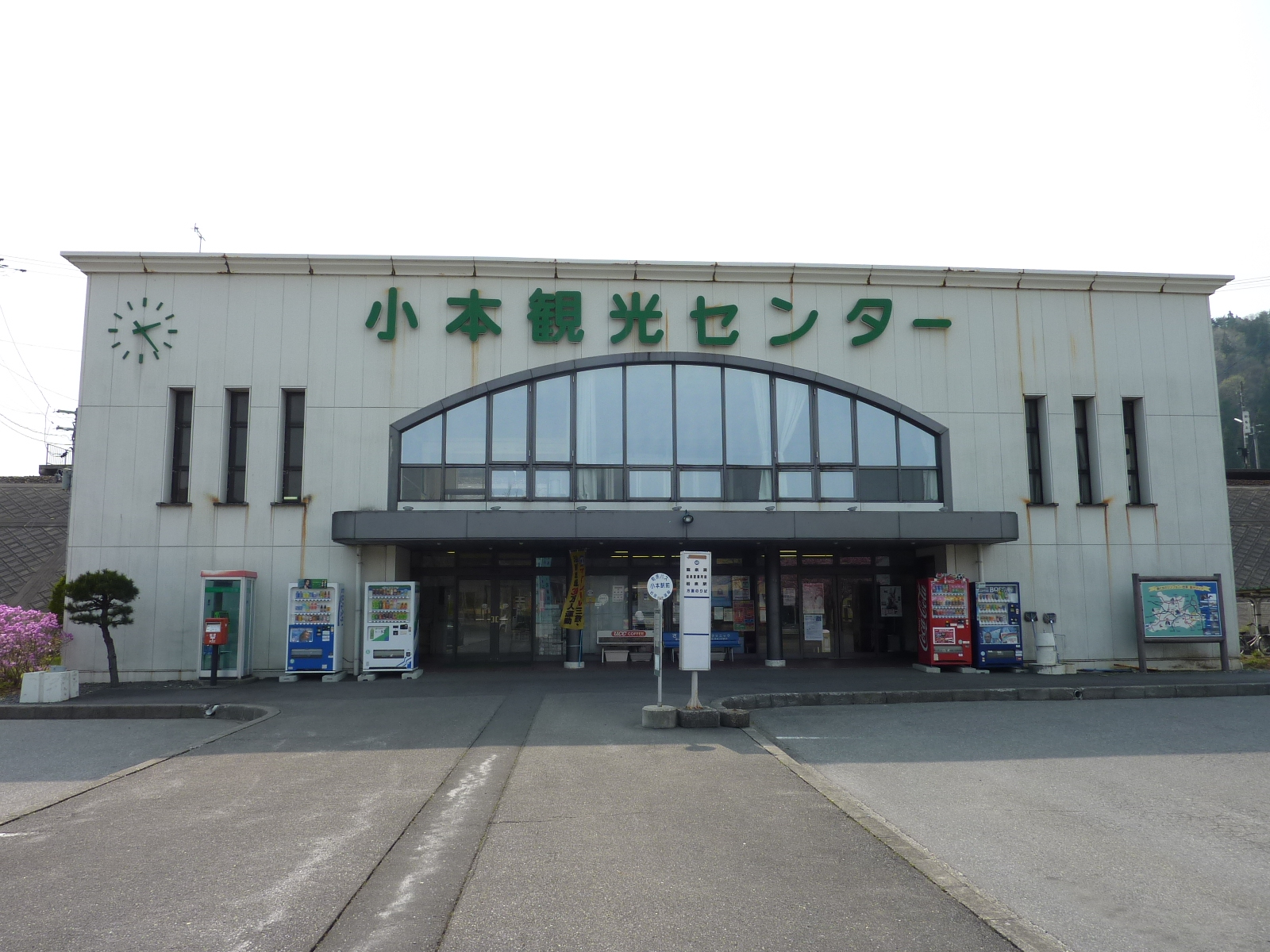
- Omoto Station in May 2010

General information
- Location: Omoto, Iwaizumi-machi, Shimohei-gun, Iwate-ken 027-0421; Japan
- Coordinates: 39°50′33.4″N 141°57′30.5″E
- Operator: Sanriku Railway Company
- Line: ■ Rias Line
- Distance: 117.1 km from Sakari
- Platforms: 1 island platform
- Tracks: 2

Construction
- Structure type: At grade

Other information
- Status: Staffed
- Website: Official website

History
- Opened: 1 April 1984
- Former names: Omoto Station (to 2015)
Location
- Location within Japan

Iwaizumi-Omoto Station (岩泉小本駅, Iwaizumi-Omoto-eki) is a railway station on the North Rias Line in the town of Iwaizumi, Iwate Prefecture, Japan, operated by Sanriku Railway.

== Lines ==
Omoto Station is served by the Rias Line, and lies 117.1 kilometers from the terminus of the line at Sakari Station.

== Station layout ==
Omoto Station has a single island platform connected to the station building by an underground passage. The station building is staffed, and also serves as the Iwaizumi Disaster Relief Centre as well as the Iwaizumi Tourist Information Centre.

=== Platforms ===
1	■ Rias Line	for Miyako, Kamaishi, and Sakari
2	■ Rias Line	for Kuji

== Adjacent stations ==
←	Service	→
Rias Line
Settai	Local	Shimanokoshi

== History ==
The station, originally named Omoto Station (小本駅, Omoto-eki), opened on 1 April 1984.

During the 11 March 2011 Tōhoku earthquake and tsunami, part of the tracks and the station building at Shimanoshi were swept away, suspending services on a portion of the Sanriku Railway. However, the section of the line from Omoto to Tarō reopened on 29 March 2011, and the section from Omoto to Tanohata reopened on 6 April 2014.

From 27 December 2015, the station was renamed Iwaizumi-Omoto Station. The renaming was at the request of the town of Iwaizumi, as no stations serving the town contain the name "Iwaizumi" following the closure of the JR East Iwaizumi Line and Iwaizumi Station in 2014.

Minami-Rias Line, a portion of Yamada Line, and Kita-Rias Line constitute Rias Line on 23 March 2019. Accordingly, this station became an intermediate station of Rias Line.

== Surrounding area ==
- National Route 45
- National Route 455
- Omoto Post Office

== See also ==
- List of railway stations in Japan
