= Shimanokoshi Station =

Railway station in Tanohata, Iwate Prefecture, Japan

Shimanokoshi Station 島越駅
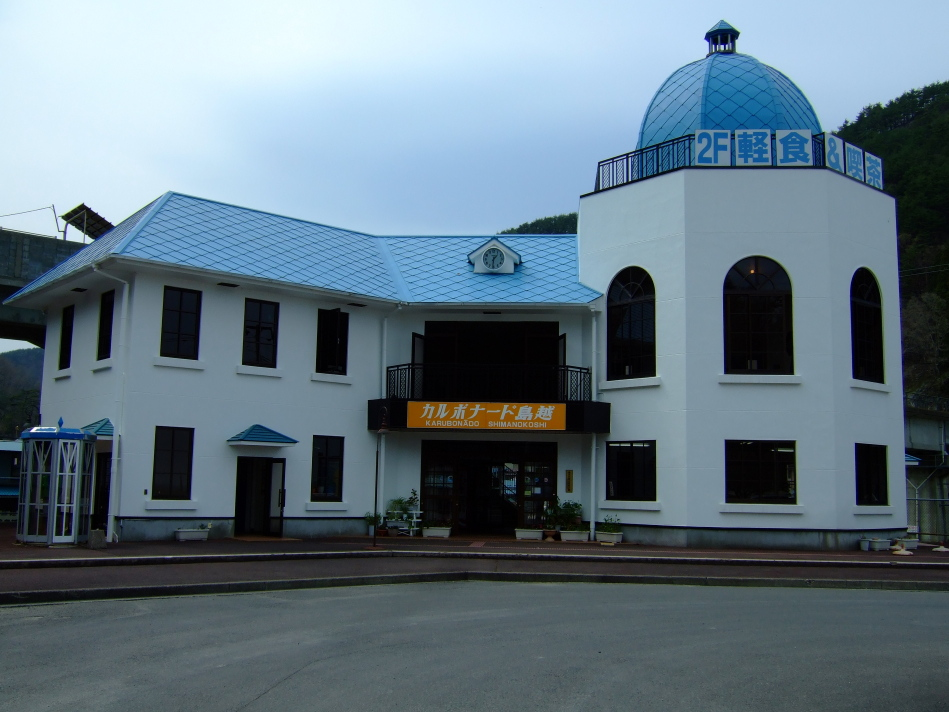
- former Shimanokoshi Station in May 2010

General information
- Location: Dai-2 Matsumaezawa 1-20, Tanohata-mura, Shimohei-gun, Iwate 028-8404; Japan
- Coordinates: 39°54′57.5″N 141°56′22.7″E
- Operator: Sanriku Railway Company
- Line: ■ Rias Line
- Distance: 125.6 km from Sakari
- Platforms: 1 side platform
- Tracks: 1

Construction
- Structure type: At grade

Other information
- Status: Unstaffed
- Website: Official website

History
- Opened: 1 April 1984
- Rebuilt: 27 July 2014
Location
- Location within Japan

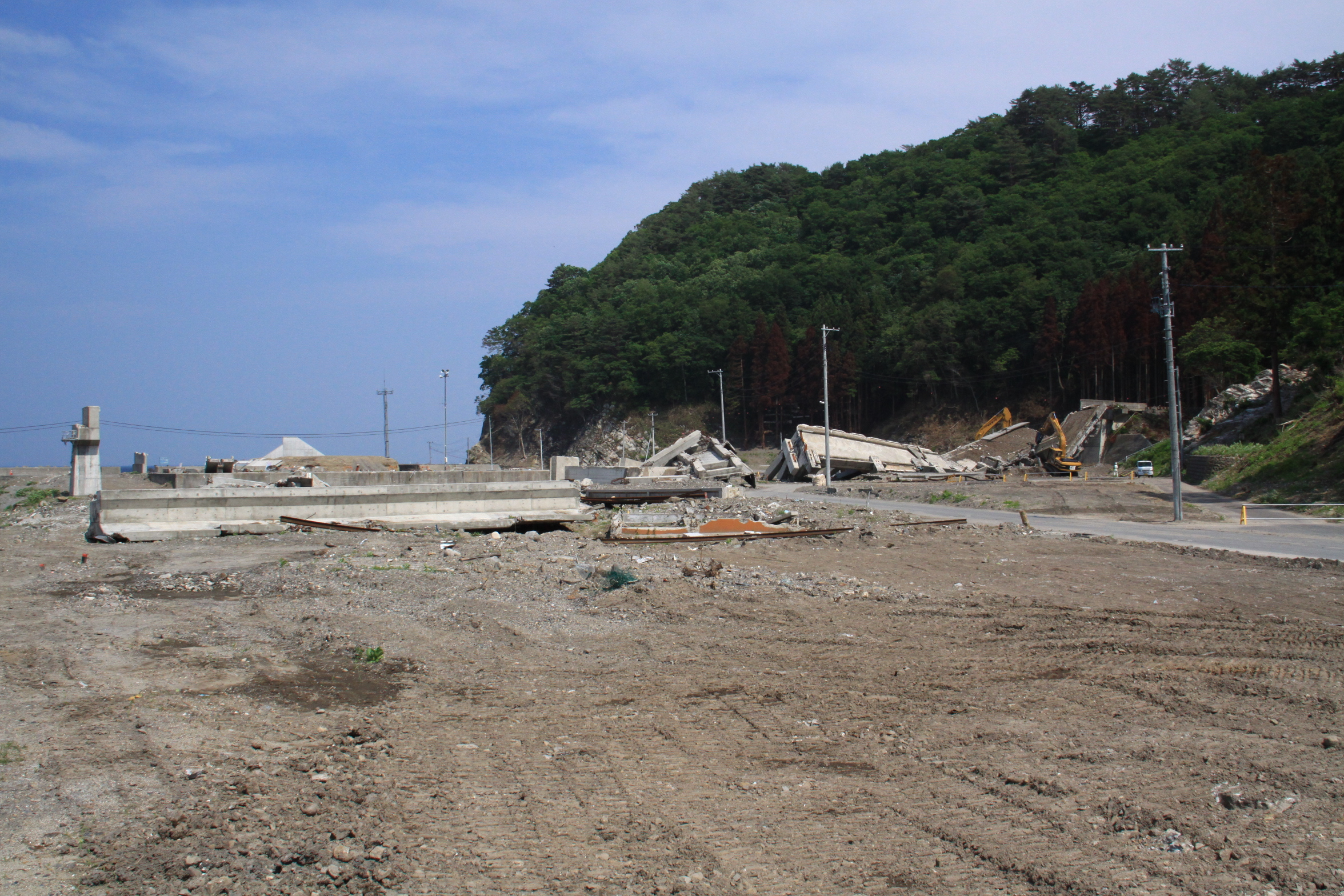
Shimanokoshi Station after the 2011 earthquake and tsunami

Shimanokoshi Station (島越駅, Shimanokoshi-eki) is a railway station on the Sanriku Railway Company’s Rias Line located in the village of Tanohata, Iwate Prefecture, Japan. The station was destroyed by the 2011 Tōhoku earthquake and tsunami and subsequently rebuilt at a new location.

== Lines ==
Shimanokoshi Station is served by the Rias Line, and is located 125.6 rail kilometers from the terminus of the line at Sakari Station.

== Station layout ==
Shimanokoshi Station had a single side platform serving a single bi-directional track, located on an embankment.

== Adjacent stations ==
←	Service	→
Sanriku Railway Company
Iwaizumi-Omoto	Local	Tanohata

== History ==
Shimanokoshi Station opened on 1 April 1984, the same day of the privatization of the Japan National Railway (JNR) Kuji Line (which became the Sanriku Railway Company). During the 11 March 2011 Tōhoku earthquake and tsunami, much of the surrounding area was destroyed by a 20 metres (66 ft) tsunami, which also swept away the station building, and parts of the tracks and suspending services on a portion of the Sanriku Railway. The portion of the line from Rikuchū-Noda to Tanohata resumed operations on 1 April 2012., and services were extended to Omoto on 6 April 2014. The new station building was constructed approximately 100 meters north of the original station, on higher ground.。The new station building was officially opened on 27 July 2014. Minami-Rias Line, a portion of Yamada Line, and Kita-Rias Line constitute Rias Line on 23 March 2019. Accordingly, this station became an intermediate station of Rias Line.

== Surrounding area ==
- Shimanokoshi Post Office

== See also ==
- List of railway stations in Japan
