= Ōtsuchi Station =

Railway station in Ōtsuchi, Iwate Prefecture, Japan

Coordinates: 39.3568°N 141.9030°E

Ōtsuchi Station 大槌駅
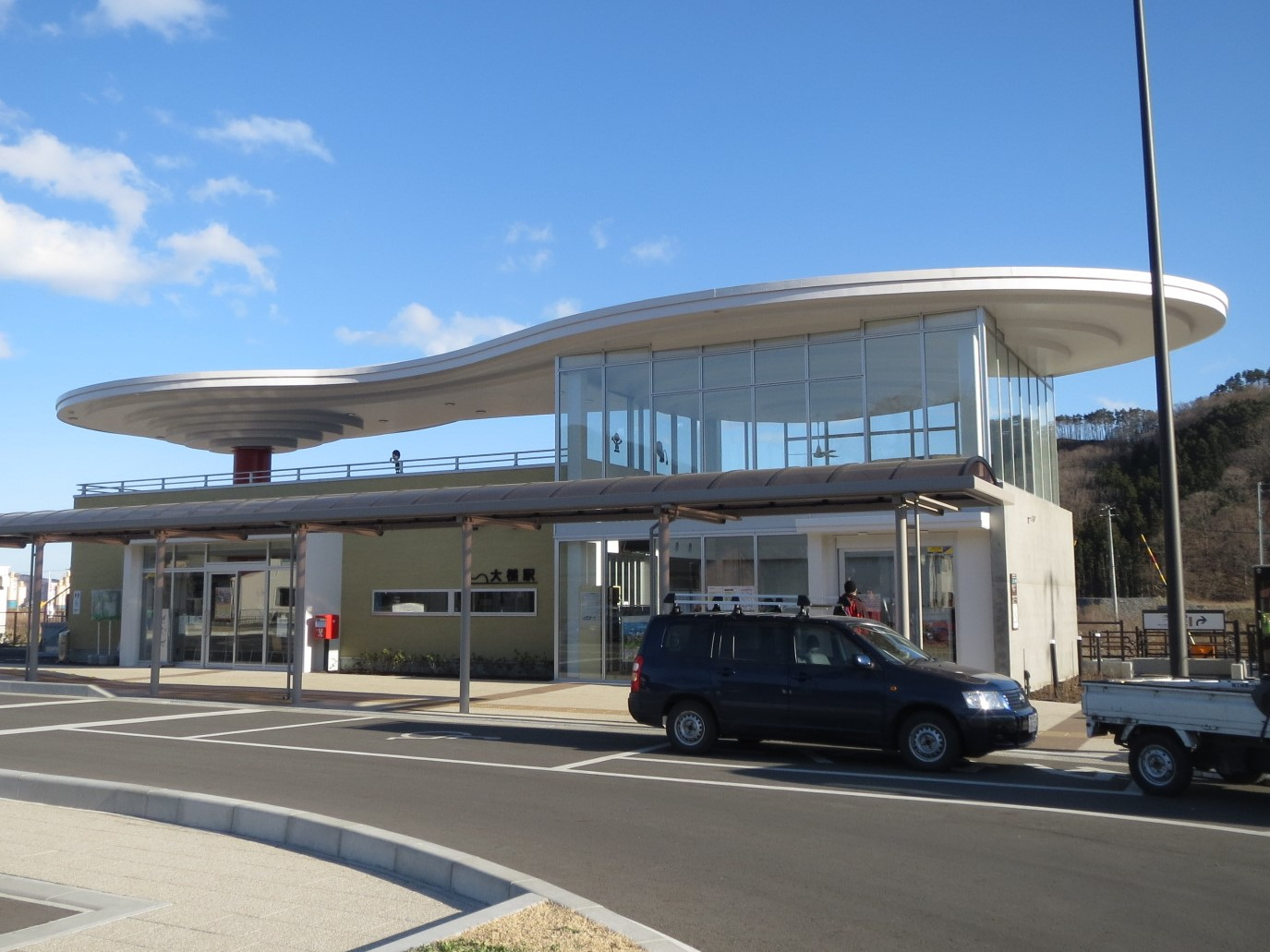
- Ōtsuchi Station in March 2019

General information
- Location: Honchō 1-1, Ōtsuchi, Kamihei, Iwate （岩手県上閉伊郡大槌町本町1-1） Japan
- Operator: Sanriku Railway
- Line: ■ Rias Line
- Distance: 48.9 km from Sakari

History
- Opened: 1938

Passengers
- FY2012: 76 daily
Location

Ōtsuchi Station (大槌駅, Ōtsuchi-eki) is a Sanriku Railway Company station located in Ōtsuchi, Iwate Prefecture, Japan.

== Lines ==
Ōtsuchi Station was served by the Rias Line, and was located 48.9 rail kilometers from the terminus of the line at Sakari Station. Formerly, it was served by the Yamada Line.

== Station layout ==
Ōtsuchi Station has an island platform connected to the station building. Access to the island platform is by means of a level crossing.

=== Platforms ===
| 1 | ■ Rias Line | for Miyako , and Kuji |
| 2 | ■ Rias Line | for Kamaishi , and Sakari |

== Adjacent stations ==
| « | Service | » |
Rias Line
| Unosumai | - | Kirikiri |

== History ==
Ōtsuchi Station opened on 5 April 1938. The station was absorbed into the JR East network upon the privatization of the Japan National Railways (JNR) on 1 April 1987. The station was destroyed by the 11 March 2011, Tōhoku earthquake and tsunami.

As of 2018, the station have been rebuilt along with the rest of the closed segment of the Yamada Line. It was transferred to the Sanriku Railway upon completion on 23 March 2019. This segment joined up with the Kita-Rias Line on one side and the Minami-Rias Line on the other, which together constitutes the entire Rias Line. Accordingly, this station became an intermediate station of Rias Line.

== Surrounding area ==
- National Route 45
- Ōtsuchi Town Hall
