= Rikuchū-Noda Station =

Railway station in Noda, Iwate Prefecture, Japan

Rikuchū-Noda Station 陸中野田駅
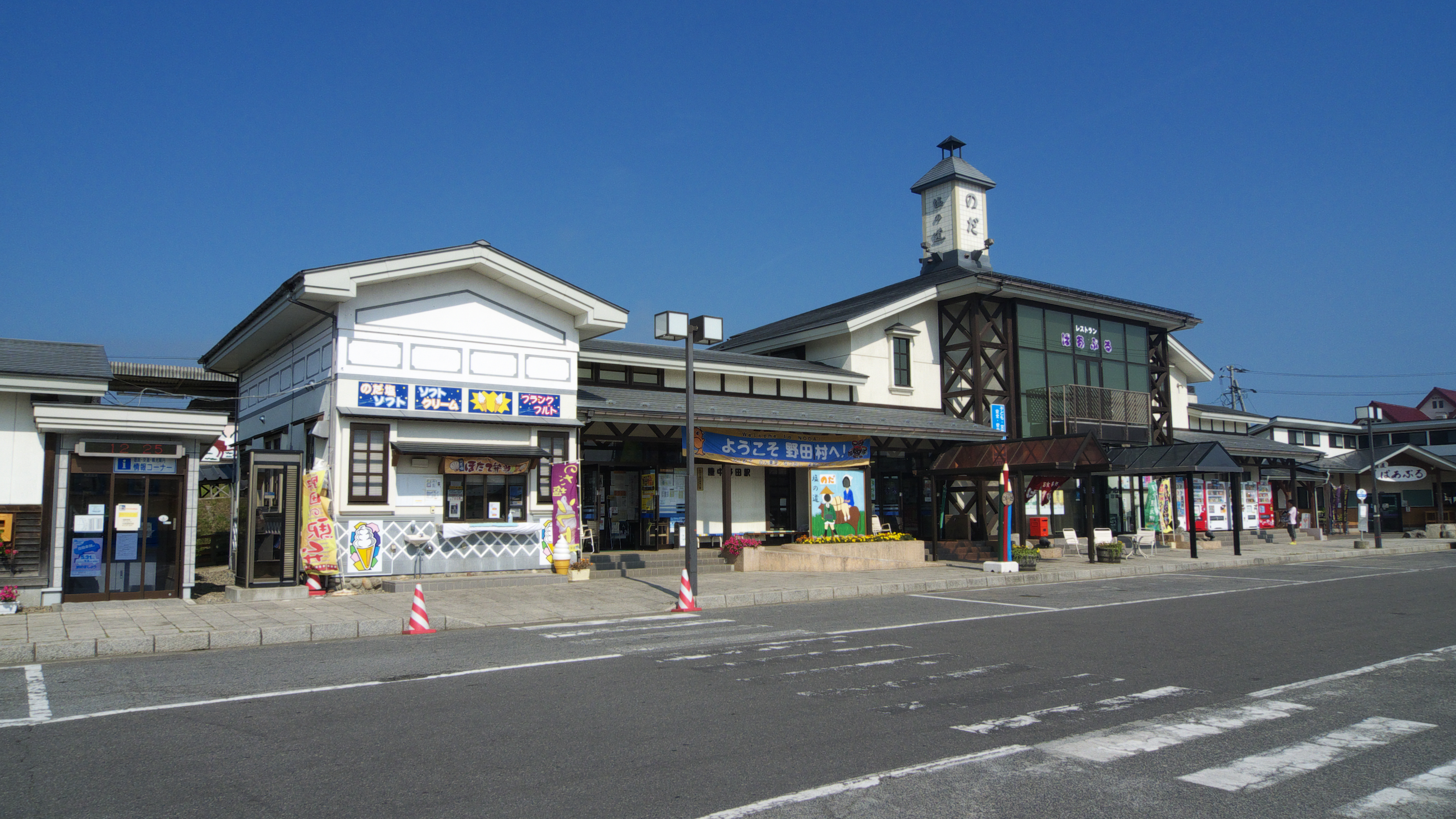
- Rikuchū-Noda Station in September 2012

General information
- Location: Noda dai-31 jiwari, Noda-mura, Kunohe-gun, Iwate-ken 028-8201; Japan
- Coordinates: 40°6′57.5″N 141°49′8″E
- Operator: Sanriku Railway
- Line: ■ Rias Line
- Distance: 151.9 km from Sakari
- Platforms: 1 island platform
- Tracks: 2

Construction
- Structure type: At grade

Other information
- Status: Staffed
- Website: Official website

History
- Opened: 20 July 1975
Location
- Location within Japan

Rikuchū-Noda Station (陸中野田駅, Rikuchū-Noda-eki) is a railway station on the Rias Line in the village of Noda, Iwate, Japan, operated by the third-sector railway operator Sanriku Railway.

== Lines ==
Rikuchū-Noda Station is served by the 71.0 km (44.1 mi) Rias Line between Miyako and Kuji, and lies 151.9 km (94.4 mi) from the starting point of the line at Sakari Station.

== Station layout ==
Rikuchū-Noda Station has a single island platform serving two tracks. The station is staffed.

=== Platforms ===
1	■ Kita-Rias Line	for Kuji
2	■ Kita-Rias Line	for Miyako, Kamaishi, and Sakari

== Adjacent stations ==
←	Service	→
Rias Line
Tofugaura-Kaigan	Local	Rikuchū-Ube

== History ==
Rikuchū-Noda Station opened on 20 July 1975 as a station on the Japanese National Railways (JNR) Kuji Line. On 1 April 1984, the station was transferred to the control of the third-sector Sanriku Railway. Minami-Rias Line, a portion of Yamada Line, and Kita-Rias Line constitute Rias Line on 23 March 2019. Accordingly, this station became an intermediate station of Rias Line.

== Surrounding area ==
- National Route 45
- Rikuchū-Noda Roadside station
- Noda Village Hall
- Noda Post Office

== See also ==
- List of railway stations in Japan
