= Kamaishi Recovery Memorial Stadium =

Rugby stadium in Japan

- 釜石鵜住居復興スタジアム
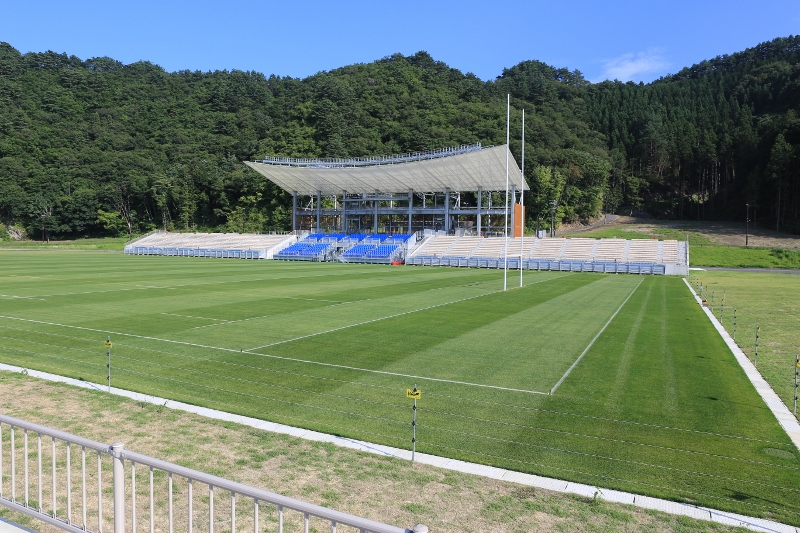
- Interactive map of Kamaishi Recovery Memorial Stadium
- Location: Kamaishi, Iwate, Japan
- Coordinates: 39°19′40″N 141°53′32″E
- Owner: Kamaishi City
- Capacity: 16,187 (Rugby World Cup); 6,000 (permanent)
- Public transit: Unosumai Station

Construction
- Groundbreaking: April 2017
- Opened: 19 August 2018
- Cost: ¥3 billion

Tenant
- 2019 Rugby World Cup

Kamaishi Recovery Memorial Stadium (Japanese: 釜石鵜住居復興スタジアム, Hepburn: Kamaishi Unosumai Fukkō Sutajiamu), a.k.a. the Kamaishi Unosumai Stadium, is a stadium in Unosumai-cho, Kamaishi, Iwate. Construction on the 16,187-seat venue broke ground in April 2017 and it was completed on 19 August 2018. It hosted one pool match during the 2019 Rugby World Cup, with another scheduled match that was cancelled due to Typhoon Hagibis.

== History ==
The city of Kamaishi historically hosted one of Japan's most successful rugby union clubs, Nippon Steel Kamaishi, which won several national titles during the 1970s and 1980s. The club folded in 2001 and was replaced by the Kamaishi Seawaves. Kamaishi suffered major damage during the 2011 Tōhoku earthquake and tsunami, leaving over 1,000 residents dead or missing, and damaging a large portion of the city.

In 2014, the municipal government announced that it would bid to host part of the 2019 Rugby World Cup and build a new stadium as part of the Unosumai area's post-disaster recovery. The stadium, to be located on the former site of schools that were destroyed in the tsunami, was named as one of twelve venues selected in March 2015 by World Rugby for the tournament. The ¥3 billion cost of the stadium attracted criticism from residents and observers, noting that the area was in need of rebuilt infrastructure and permanent housing for displaced residents.

Construction on the stadium began in April 2017, with a groundbreaking and prayer ceremony, and was completed in July 2018. The stadium opened on 19 August 2018 for an exhibition match between the Kamaishi Seawaves and Yamaha Júbilo, attended by 6,000 people. Unosumai Station on JR East's Yamada Line will be rebuilt to serve the stadium. The stadium will be expanded to 16,000 seats for the 2019 Rugby World Cup and host two group matches. The city government also plans to promote the stadium in Japan's bid to host the 2023 FIFA Women's World Cup.

Two pool matches of the 2019 Rugby World Cup were scheduled to be played at the stadium, but only one was contested, with Uruguay achieving an upset victory over Fiji on 25 September. The match between Namibia and Canada scheduled for 13 October 2019 was cancelled due to the effects of Typhoon Hagibis on the local area.

== Design ==
The stadium used 10,000 temporary seats for the 2019 Rugby World Cup, with 6,000 permanent seats remaining after the tournament. The temporary seating uses local Japanese cedar that was harvested after a wildfire in 2017. It is the first venue in Japan to use AirFibr, a type of hybrid grass surface.

== 2019 Rugby World Cup matches ==
Date	Time (JST)	Team #1	Res.	Team #2	Round	Attendance
25 September 2019	14:15	Fiji	27–30	Uruguay	Pool C	14,025
13 October 2019	12:15	Namibia	0–0 (Cancelled)	Canada	Pool B	N/A
