= Kirikiri Station =

Railway station in Ōtsuchi, Iwate Prefecture, Japan

Coordinates: 39.3698°N 141.9389°E

Kirikiri Station 吉里吉里駅
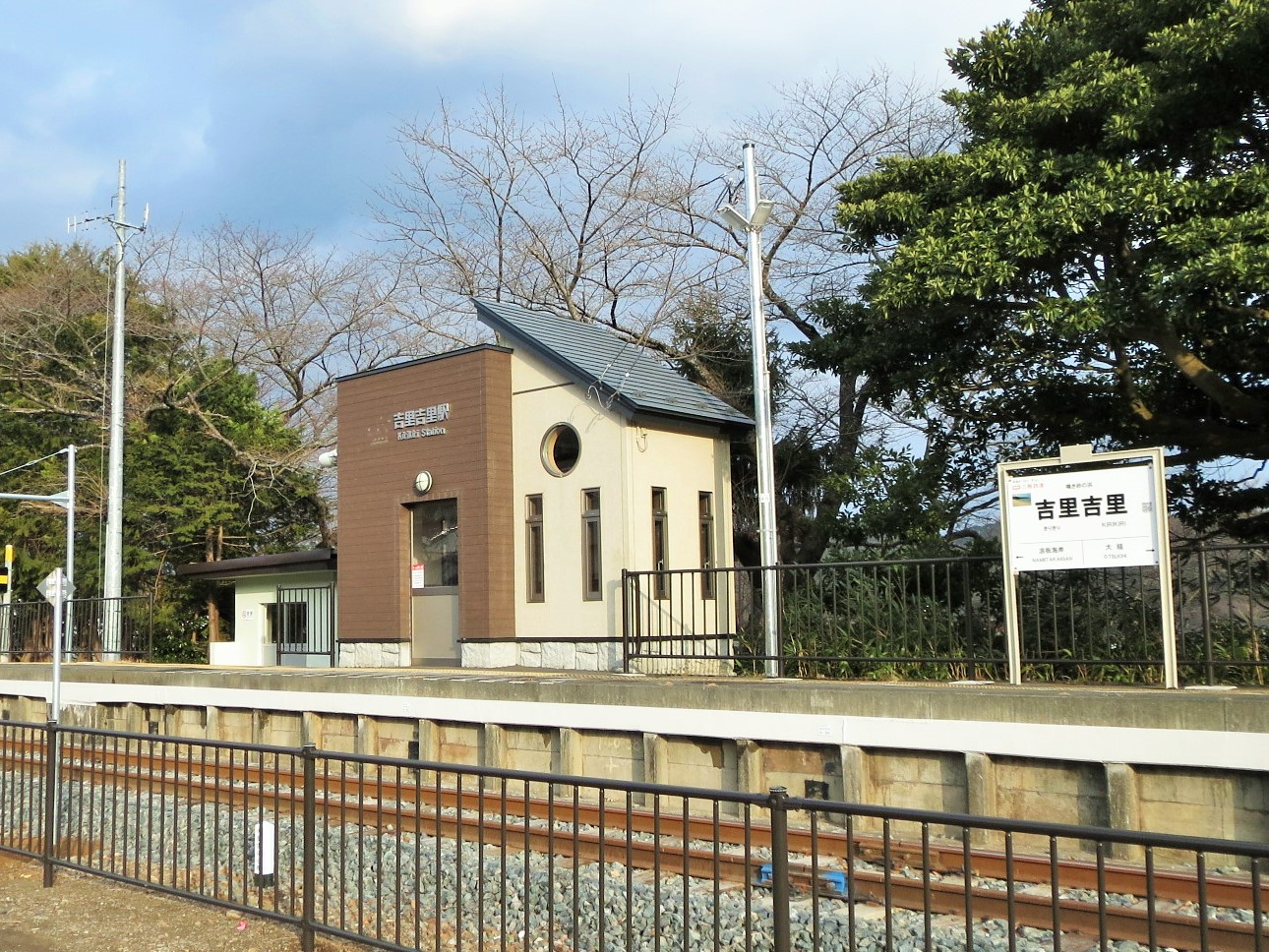
- Kirikiri Station in February 2019

General information
- Location: Kirikiri 2-chome, Ōtsuchi, Kamihei, Iwate （岩手県上閉伊郡大槌町吉里吉里二丁目1） Japan
- Operator: Sanriku Railway
- Line: ■ Rias Line
- Distance: 52.3 km from Sakari

History
- Opened: 1938
Location

Kirikiri Station (吉里吉里駅, Kirikiri-eki) is a JR East railway station in Ōtsuchi, Iwate Prefecture, Japan.

== Lines ==
Kirikiri Station was served by the Rias Line, and was 52.3 rail kilometres (32.5 mi) from the terminus of the line at Sakari Station.

== Station layout ==
Kirikiri Station have a single side platform serving traffic in both directions.

== Adjacent stations ==
«	Service	»
Rias Line
Ōtsuchi	-	Namiitakaigan

== History ==
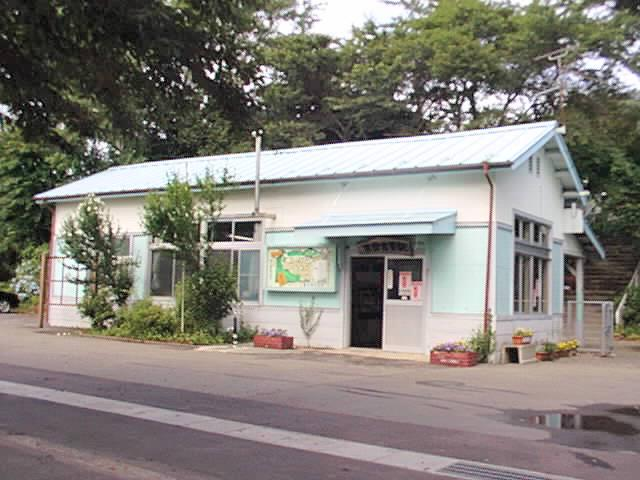
The old station building demolished in February 2012

Kirikiri Station opened on 5 April 1938. The station was absorbed into the JR East network upon the privatization of the Japan National Railways (JNR) on 1 April 1987. Operations on the Yamada Line between Miyako Station and Kamaishi Station were suspended after the 11 March 2011 Tōhoku earthquake and tsunami. The damaged station building was demolished in February 2012. As of 2018, the station have been rebuilt along with the rest of the closed segment of the Yamada Line. It was transferred to the Sanriku Railway upon completion on 23 March 2019. This segment joined up with the Kita-Rias Line on one side and the Minami-Rias Line on the other, which together constitutes the entire Rias Line. Accordingly, this station became an intermediate station of Rias Line.

== Surrounding area ==
- National Route 45
- Kirikiri Post Office
