= Ryōishi Station =

Railway station in Kamaishi, Iwate Prefecture, Japan

Coordinates: 39.3081°N 141.8890°E

Ryōishi Station 両石駅
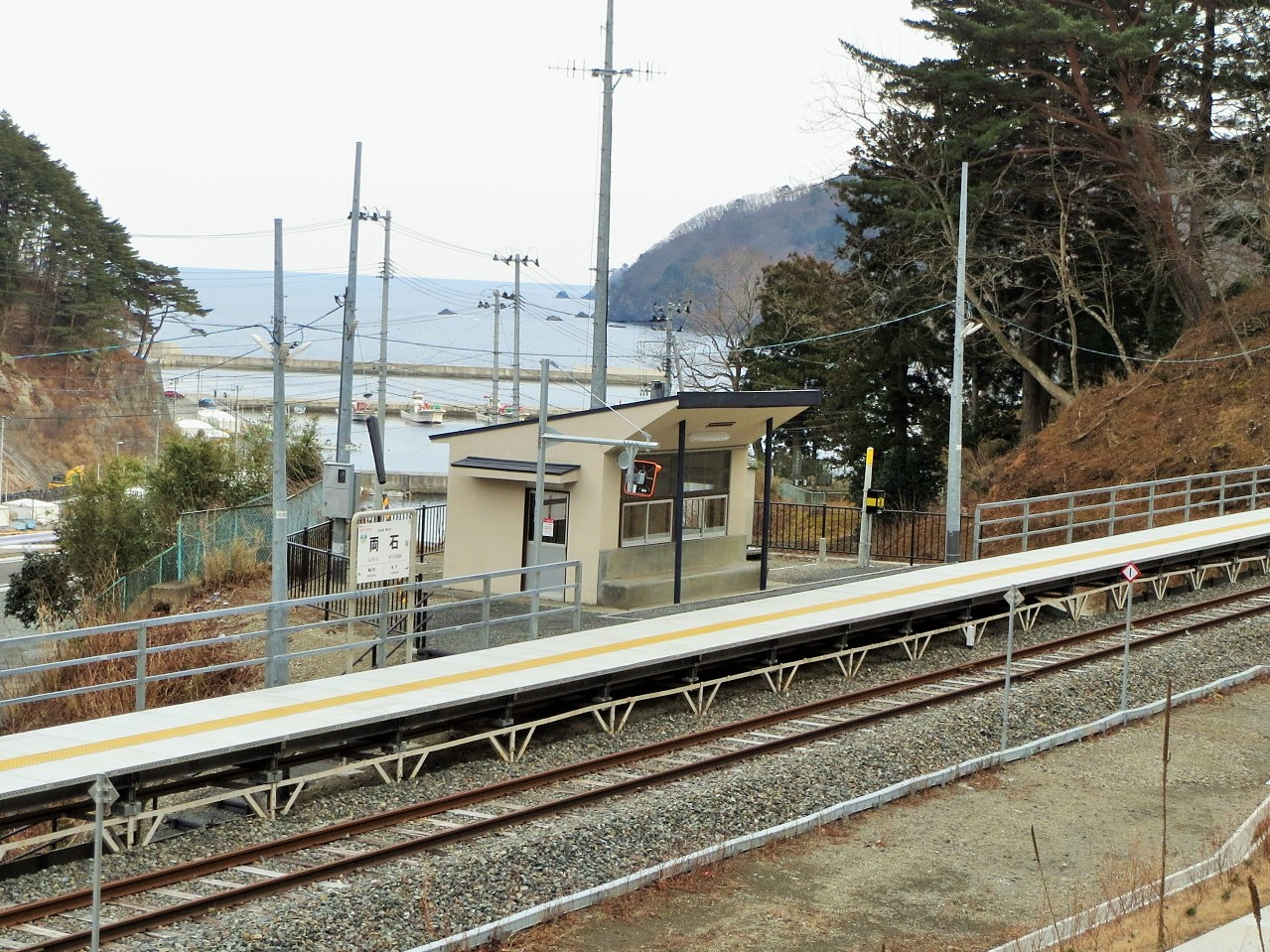
- Ryōishi Station in February 2019

General information
- Location: Ryōishi-chō dai-3 jiwari 14, Kamaishi, Iwate （岩手県釜石市両石町第3地割14） Japan
- Operator: Sanriku Railway
- Line: ■ Rias Line
- Distance: 42.7 km from Sakari

History
- Opened: 1951
Location

Ryōishi Station (両石駅, Ryōishi-eki) is a Sanriku Railway Company station located in Kamaishi, Iwate Prefecture, Japan.

== Lines ==
Ryōishi Station was served by the Rias Line, and was located 42.7 rail kilometers from the terminus of the line at Sakari Station.

== Station layout ==
Ryōishi Station had a single side platform serving traffic in both directions. There was no station building, but only a shelter on the platform. The station was unattended.

== Adjacent stations ==
«	Service	»
Rias Line
Kamaishi	-	Unosumai

== History ==
Ryōishi Station opened on 23 July 1951 as an intermediate station of Yamada Line. The station was absorbed into the JR East network upon the privatization of the Japan National Railways (JNR) on 1 April 1987. Operations on the Yamada Line between Miyako Station and Kamaishi Station were suspended after the 11 March 2011 Tōhoku earthquake and tsunami. As of 2018, the station have been rebuilt along with the rest of the closed segment of the Yamada Line. It was transferred to the Sanriku Railway upon completion on 23 March 2019. This segment joined up with the Kita-Rias Line on one side and the Minami-Rias Line on the other, which together constitutes the entire Rias Line. Accordingly, this station became an intermediate station of Rias Line.

== Surrounding area ==
- National Route 45
- Ryōishi Fishing Port
