= Ryōri Station =

Railway station in Ōfunato, Iwate Prefecture, Japan

Ryōri Station 綾里駅
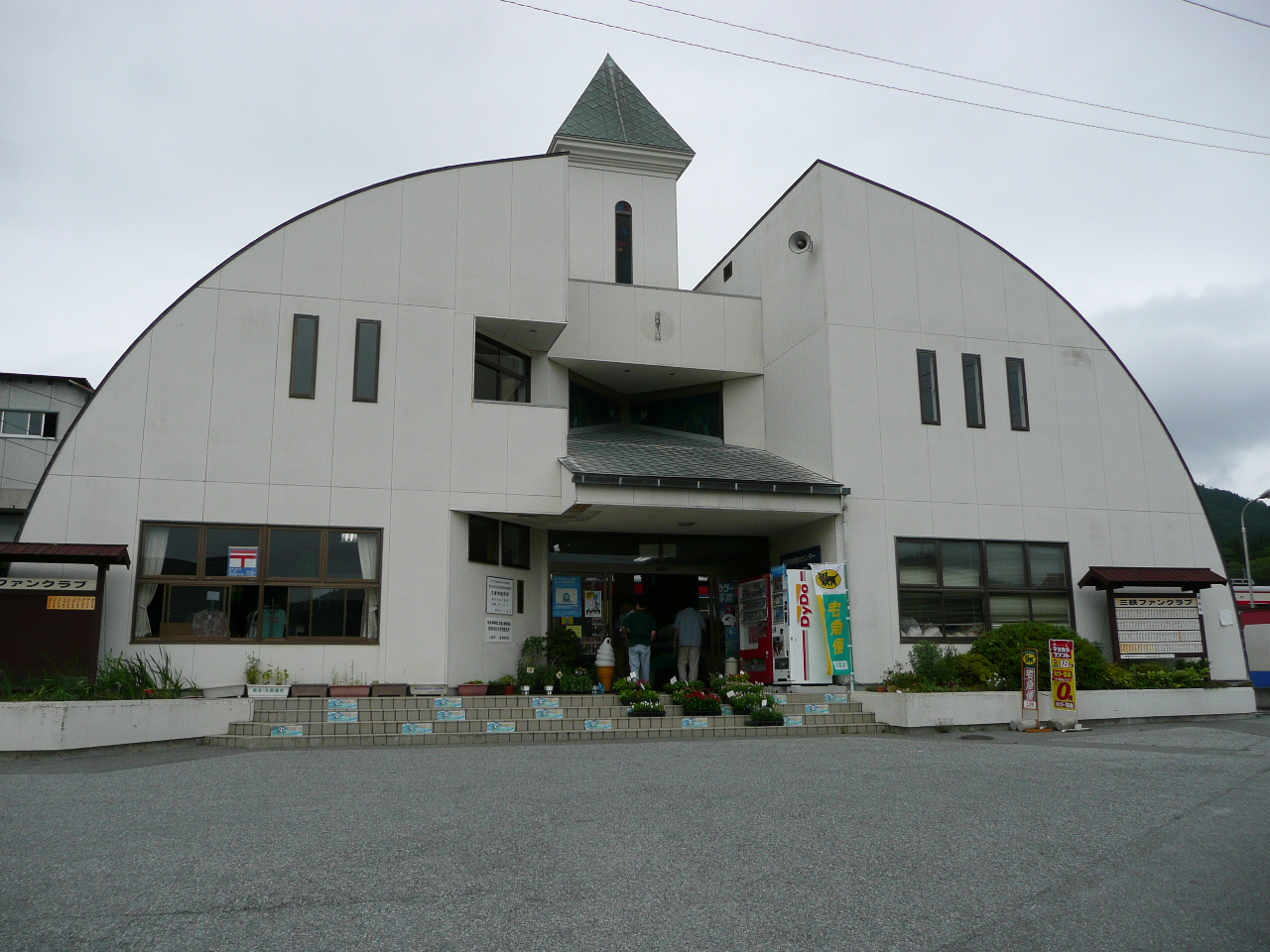
- Ryōri Station in May 2010

General information
- Location: Sanriku-cho Ryōri, Ōfunato-shi, Iwate-ken 022-0211; Japan
- Coordinates: 39°03′14.6″N 141°47′56.6″E
- Operator: Sanriku Railway
- Line: ■ Rias Line
- Distance: 9.1 km from Sakari
- Platforms: 2 side platforms
- Tracks: 1

Other information
- Status: Staffed
- Website: Official website

History
- Opened: 1 July 1973
- Former names: 47
Location
- Location within Japan

Ryōri Station (綾里駅, Ryōri-eki) is a railway station on the Sanriku Railway Company’s Rias Line located in the city of Ōfunato, Iwate Prefecture, Japan. It is 9.1 rail kilometers from the terminus of the line at Sakari Station.

== Station layout ==
Ryōri Station has two opposed side platforms. The station is staffed.

=== Platforms ===
| 1 | ■ Sanriku Railway | for Sakari |
| 2 | ■ Sanriku Railway | for Kamaishi, Miyako and Kuji |

== History ==
Ryōri Station opened on 1 March 1970 as a station on the Japan National Railway (JNR). It was privatized on 1 April 1984, becoming a station on the Sanriku Railway. During the 11 March 2011 Tōhoku earthquake and tsunami, part of the tracks on the Minami-Rias Line were swept away, thus suspending services. The line resumed operations on 3 April 2013 between Sakari and Yoshihama. Services between Yoshihama and Kamaishi resumed on 5 April 2014. Minami-Rias Line, a portion of Yamada Line, and Kita-Rias Line constitute Rias Line on 23 March 2019. Accordingly, this station became an intermediate station of Rias Line.

== Adjacent stations ==
| ← | Service | → |
Sanriku Railway Company
| Rikuzen-Akasaki | Local | Koishihama |

== Surrounding area ==
- Ryōri Post Office
- Ryōri Elementary School

== See also ==
- List of railway stations in Japan
