= Rikuchū-Ube Station =

Railway station in Kuji, Iwate Prefecture, Japan

Rikuchū-Ube Station 陸中宇部駅
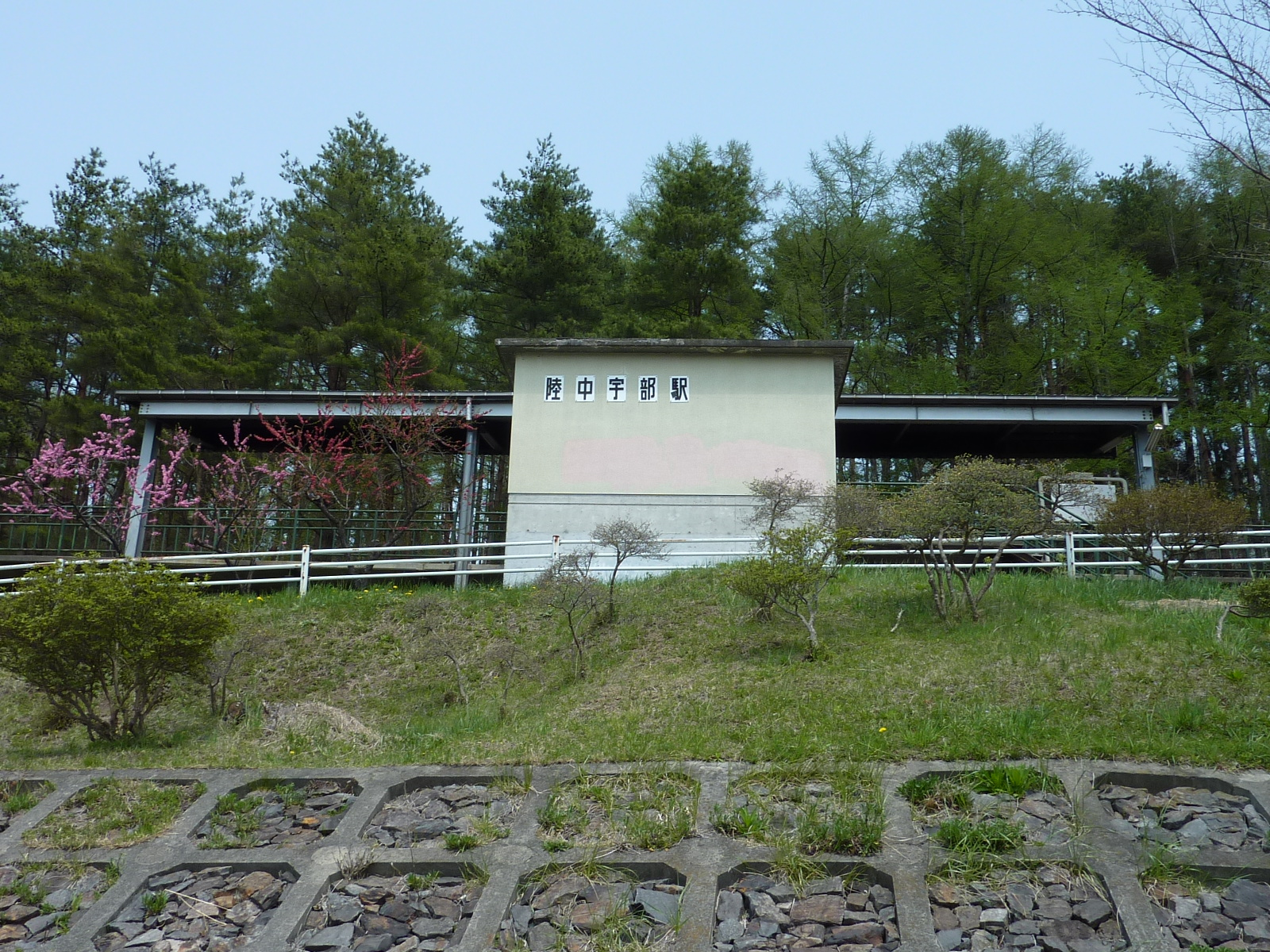
- Rikuchū-Ube Station in May 2010

General information
- Location: Ube-chō dai-5 juwari, Kuji-shi, Iwate-ken 028-8111; Japan
- Coordinates: 40°07′56.77″N 141°47′9.31″E
- Operator: Sanriku Railway Company
- Line: ■ Rias Line
- Distance: 155.3 km from Sakari
- Platforms: 1 side platform
- Tracks: 1

Construction
- Structure type: At grade

Other information
- Status: Unstaffed
- Website: Official website

History
- Opened: 20 July 1975

Passengers
- FY2014: 24
Location
- Location within Japan

Rikuchū-Ube Station (陸中宇部駅, Rikuchū-Ube-eki) is a railway station on the Rias Line in the city of Kuji, Iwate, Japan, operated by the third-sector railway operator Sanriku Railway Company.

== Lines ==
Rikuchū-Ube Station is served by the 71.0 km (44.1 mi) Kita-Rias Line between Miyako and Kuji, and lies 155.3 km (96.5 mi) from the starting point of the line at Sakari Station.

== Station layout ==
Rikuchū-Ube Station has one side platform serving a single bi-directional track. The station is unattended.

== Adjacent stations ==
←	Service	→
Sanriku Railway Company
Rikuchū-Noda	Local	Kuji

== History ==
Rikuchū-Ube Station opened on 20 July 1975 as a station on the Japan National Railways (JNR) Kuji Line. On 1 April 1984, upon the privatization of the Kuji Line, the station came under the control of the Sanriku Railway Company. Minami-Rias Line, a segment of Yamada Line, and Kita-Rias Line constitute Rias Line on 23 March 2019. Accordingly, this station became an intermediate station of Rias Line.

== Surrounding area ==
- National Route 45
- Ube Post Office

== See also ==
- List of railway stations in Japan
