= Noda-Tamagawa Station =

Railway station in Noda, Iwate Prefecture, Japan

Noda-Tamagawa Station 野田玉川駅
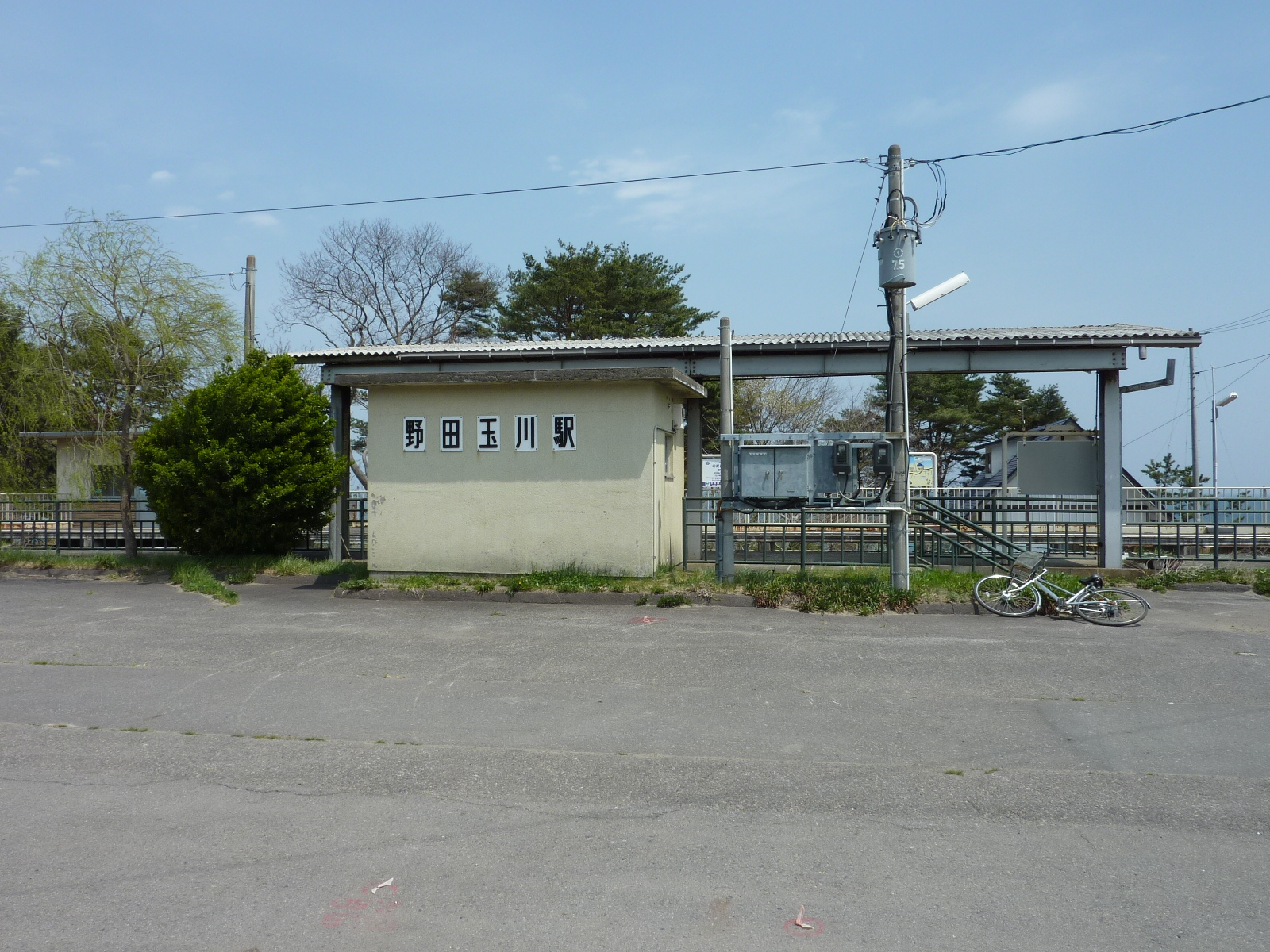
- Noda-Tamagawa Station in May 2010

General information
- Location: Tamagawa, Noda-mura, Kunohe-gun, Iwate-ken 028-8202; Japan
- Coordinates: 40°4′58.13″N 141°49′43.93″E
- Operator: Sanriku Railway
- Line: ■ Rias Line
- Distance: 147.9 km from Sakari
- Platforms: 2 side platforms
- Tracks: 2

Construction
- Structure type: At grade

Other information
- Status: Staffed
- Website: Official website

History
- Opened: 20 July 1975
Location
- Location within Japan

Noda-Tamagawa Station (野田玉川駅, Noda-Tamagawa-eki) is a railway station on the Sanriku Railway's Rias Line in the village of Noda, Iwate Prefecture, Japan.

== Lines ==
Noda-Tamagawa Station is served by the Rias Line, and is located 147.9 kilometers from the terminus of the line at Miyako Station.

== Station layout ==
The station has two opposed side platforms connected by a level crossing. The station is unstaffed.

=== Platforms ===
1	■ Kita-Rias Line	for Kuji
2	■ Kita-Rias Line	for Miyako, Kamaishi, and Sakari

== Adjacent stations ==
←	Service	→
Rias Line
Horinai	Local	Tofugaura-Kaigan

== History ==
Noda-Tamagawa Station opened on 20 July 1975 as a station on the Japanese National Railways (JNR) Kuji Line. On 1 April 1984, upon the privatization of the Kuji Line, the station came under the control of the Sanriku Railway. Following the 11 March 2011 Tōhoku earthquake and tsunami, services on a portion of the Sanriku Railway were suspended. The portion from Rikuchū-Noda to Tanohata resumed operations on 1 April 2012. Minami-Rias Line, a section of Yamada Line, and Kita-Rias Line constitute Rias Line on 23 March 2019. Accordingly, this station became an intermediate station of Rias Line.

== Surrounding area ==
- National Route 45

== See also ==
- List of railway stations in Japan
