= Horinai Station =

Railway station in Fudai, Iwate Prefecture, Japan

Horinai Station 堀内駅
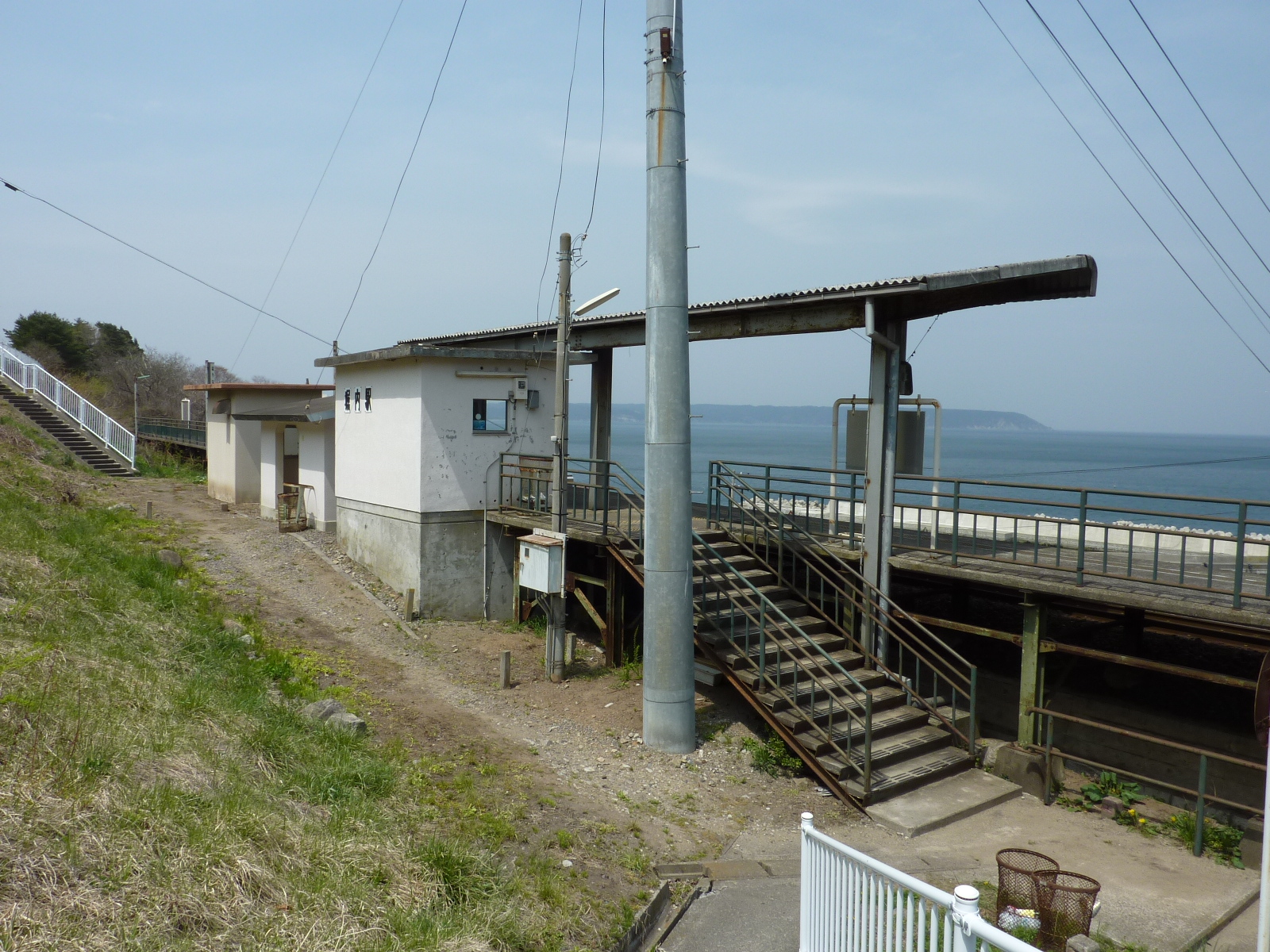
- Horinai Station in May 2010

General information
- Location: Fudai-mura, Shimohei-gun, Iwate-ken 028-8301; Japan
- Coordinates: 40°03′07.03″N 141°51′33.30″E
- Operator: Sanriku Railway Company
- Line: ■ Rias Line
- Distance: 143.4 km from Sakari
- Platforms: 1 side platform
- Tracks: 1

Construction
- Structure type: At grade

Other information
- Status: Unstaffed
- Website: Official website

History
- Opened: 20 July 1975
Location
- Location within Japan

Horinai Station (堀内駅, Horinai-eki) is a railway station on the Sanriku Railway Company’s Rias Line located in the village of Fudai, Iwate Prefecture, Japan.

== Lines ==
Horinai Station is served by the Rias Line, and is located 143.4 rail kilometers from the terminus of the line at Sakari Station.

== Station layout ==
The station has one side platform serving a single bi-directional track. The station is unattended.

== Adjacent stations ==
←	Service	→
Sanriku Railway Company
Shiraikaigan	Local	Noda-Tamagawa

== History ==
Horinai Station opened on 20 July 1975 as a station on the Japan National Railways (JNR) Kuji Line. On 1 April 1984, upon the privatization of the Kuji Line, the station came under the control of the Sanriku Railway Company. Following the 11 March 2011 Tōhoku earthquake and tsunami, services on a portion of the Sanriku Railway were suspended. The portion from Rikuchū-Noda to Tanohata resumed operations on 1 April 2012. The station was used as the set for the fictional “Sodegahama Station” in the NHK morning television drama Amachan which aired from April to September 2013. Minami-Rias Line, a portion of Yamada Line, and Kita-Rias Line constitute Rias Line on 23 March 2019. Accordingly, this station became an intermediate station of Rias Line.

== Surrounding area ==
- National Route 45
- Horinai Post Office
- Horinai Fishing Port

== See also ==
- List of railway stations in Japan
