= Tofugaura-Kaigan Station =

Railway station in Noda, Iwate Prefecture, Japan

Tofugaura-Kaigan Station 十府ヶ浦海岸駅
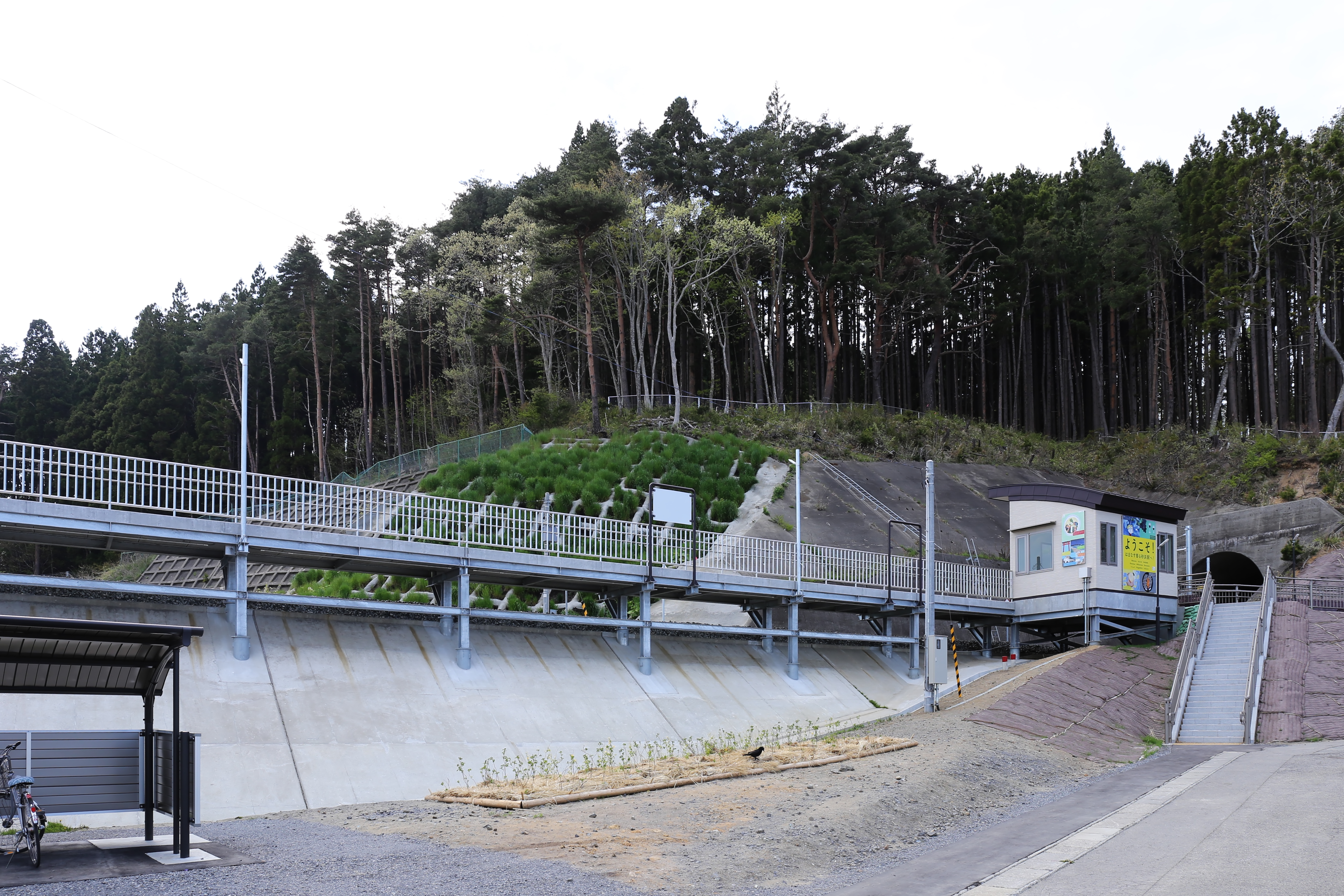
- Tofugaura-Kaigan Station in May 2017

General information
- Location: Noda, Noda-mura, Kunohe-gun, Iwate-ken 028-8201; Japan
- Coordinates: 40°6′2.8″N 141°49′25.3″E
- Operator: Sanriku Railway
- Line: ■ Rias Line
- Distance: 149.6 km from Sakari
- Platforms: 1 side platform
- Tracks: 1

Construction
- Structure type: At grade

Other information
- Status: Unstaffed
- Website: Official website

History
- Opened: 25 March 2017
Location
- Location within Japan

Tofugaura-Kaigan Station (十府ヶ浦海岸駅, Tofugaura-Kaigan-eki) is a railway station on the Rias Line in the village of Noda, Iwate, Japan, operated by the third-sector railway operator Sanriku Railway.

== Lines ==
Tofugaura-Kaigan Station is served by the 149.6 km (93.0 mi) Rias Line between Sakari and Kuji. Located between Noda-Tamagawa and Rikuchū-Noda stations, it lies 149.6 km (93.0 mi) from the starting point of the line at Sakari.

== Station layout ==
The station has one side platform serving a single bi-directional track. The station is unstaffed.

== Adjacent stations ==
←	Service	→
Rias Line
Noda-Tamagawa	Local	Rikuchū-Noda

== History ==
Initially given the provisional name Komeda Station (米田駅), construction work on the new station started on 3 August 2016. The name Tofugaura-Kaigan for the station was selected and formally announced in November 2016. The station opened on 25 March 2017. Minami-Rias Line, a portion of Yamada Line, and Kita-Rias Line constitute Rias Line on 23 March 2019. Accordingly, this station became an intermediate station of Rias Line.

== Surrounding area ==
- National Route 45

== See also ==
- List of railway stations in Japan
