= Fudai Station =

Railway station in Fudai, Iwate Prefecture, Japan

Fudai Station 普代駅
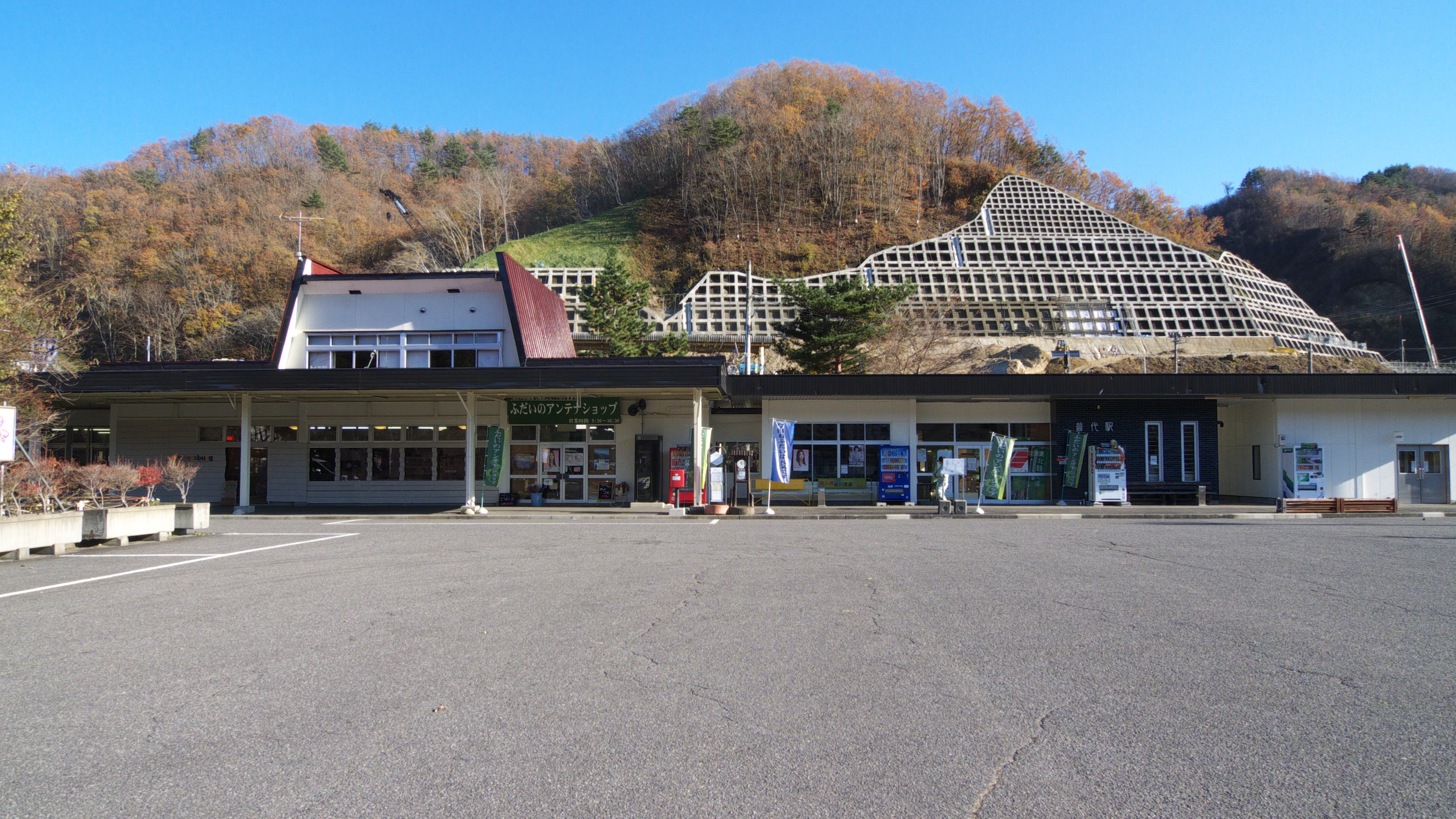
- Fudai Station in March 2013

General information
- Location: Dai-8 jiwari Doya 503, Fudai-muram Shimohei-gun, Iwate-ken 028-8332; Japan
- Coordinates: 40°0′10.08″N 141°53′10.86″E
- Operator: Sanriku Railway Company
- Line: ■ Rias Line
- Distance: 136.9 km from Sakari
- Platforms: 2 side platforms
- Tracks: 2

Construction
- Structure type: At grade

Other information
- Status: Staffed
- Website: Official website

History
- Opened: 20 July 1975
Location
- Location within Japan

Fudai Station (普代駅, Fudai-eki) is a railway station on the Sanriku Railway Company’s Rias Line located in the village of Fudai, Iwate Prefecture, Japan.

== Lines ==
Fudai Station is served by the Rias Line, and is located 136.9 rail kilometers from the terminus of the line at Sakari Station.

== Station layout ==
The station has a two opposed side platforms. The station is staffed.

=== Platforms ===
| 1 | ■ Sanriku Railway | for Kuji |
| 2 | ■ Sanriku Railway | for Miyako, Kamaishi, and Sakari |

== Adjacent stations ==
| ← | Service | → |
Sanriku Railway Company
| Tanohata | Local | Shiraikaigan |

== History ==
Fudai Station opened on 20 July 1975 as a station on the Japan National Railways (JNR) Kuji Line. On 1 April 1984, upon the privatization of the Kuji Line, the station came under the control of the Sanriku Railway Company. Following the 11 March 2011 Tōhoku earthquake and tsunami, services on a portion of the Sanriku Railway were suspended. The portion from Rikuchū-Noda to Tanohata resumed operations on 1 April 2012. Minami-Rias Line, a portion of Yamada Line, and Kita-Rias Line constitute Rias Line on 23 March 2019. Accordingly, this station became an intermediate station of Rias Line.

== Surrounding area ==
- National Route 45
- Fudai Village Hall
- Fudai Post Office
- Kurosaki Lighthouse

== See also ==
- List of railway stations in Japan
