= Shiraikaigan Station =

Railway station in Fudai, Iwate Prefecture, Japan

Shiraikaigan Station 白井海岸駅
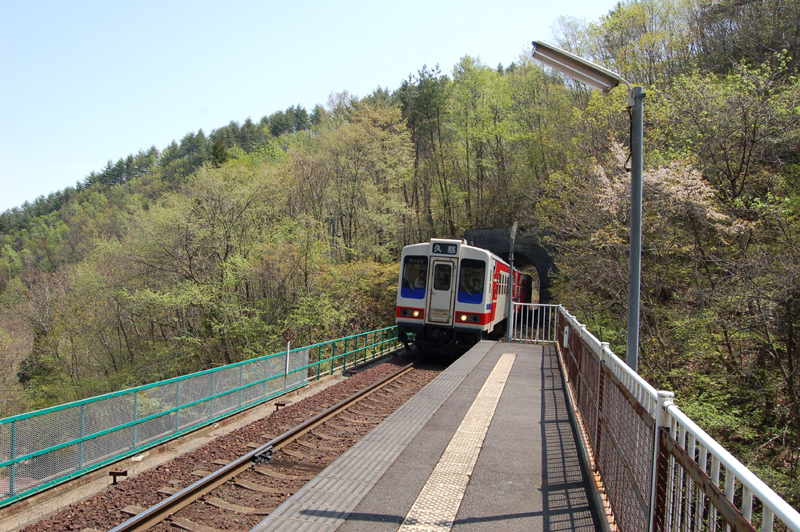
- Shiraikaigan Station in May 2008

General information
- Location: Fudai-mura, Shimohei-gun, Iwate-ken 028-8311; Japan
- Coordinates: 40°01′57.85″N 141°52′58.97″E
- Operator: Sanriku Railway Company
- Line: ■ Rias Line
- Distance: 140.3 km from Sakari
- Platforms: 1 side platform
- Tracks: 1

Construction
- Structure type: At grade

Other information
- Status: Unstaffed
- Website: Official website

History
- Opened: 22 December 1984
Location
- Location within Japan

Shiraikaigan Station (白井海岸駅, Shiraikaigan-eki) is a railway station on the Sanriku Railway Company’s Rias Line located in the village of Fudai, Iwate Prefecture, Japan.

== Lines ==
Shiraikaigan Station is served by the Rias Line, and is located 140.3 rail kilometers from the terminus of the line at Sakari Station.

== Station layout ==
The station has one side platform serving a single bi-directional track. There is no station building. The station is unattended.

== Adjacent stations ==
←	Service	→
Sanriku Railway Company
Fudai	Local	Horinai

== History ==
Shiraikaigan Station opened on 22 December 1984. Following the 11 March 2011 Tōhoku earthquake and tsunami, services on a portion of the Sanriku Railway were suspended. The portion from Rikuchū-Noda to Tanohata resumed operations on 1 April 2012. Minami-Rias Line, a portion of Yamada Line, and Kita-Rias Line constitute Rias Line on 23 March 2019. Accordingly, this station became an intermediate station of Rias Line.

== Surrounding area ==
- National Route 45

== See also ==
- List of railway stations in Japan
