= Noda, Iwate =

Noda 野田村
- Village
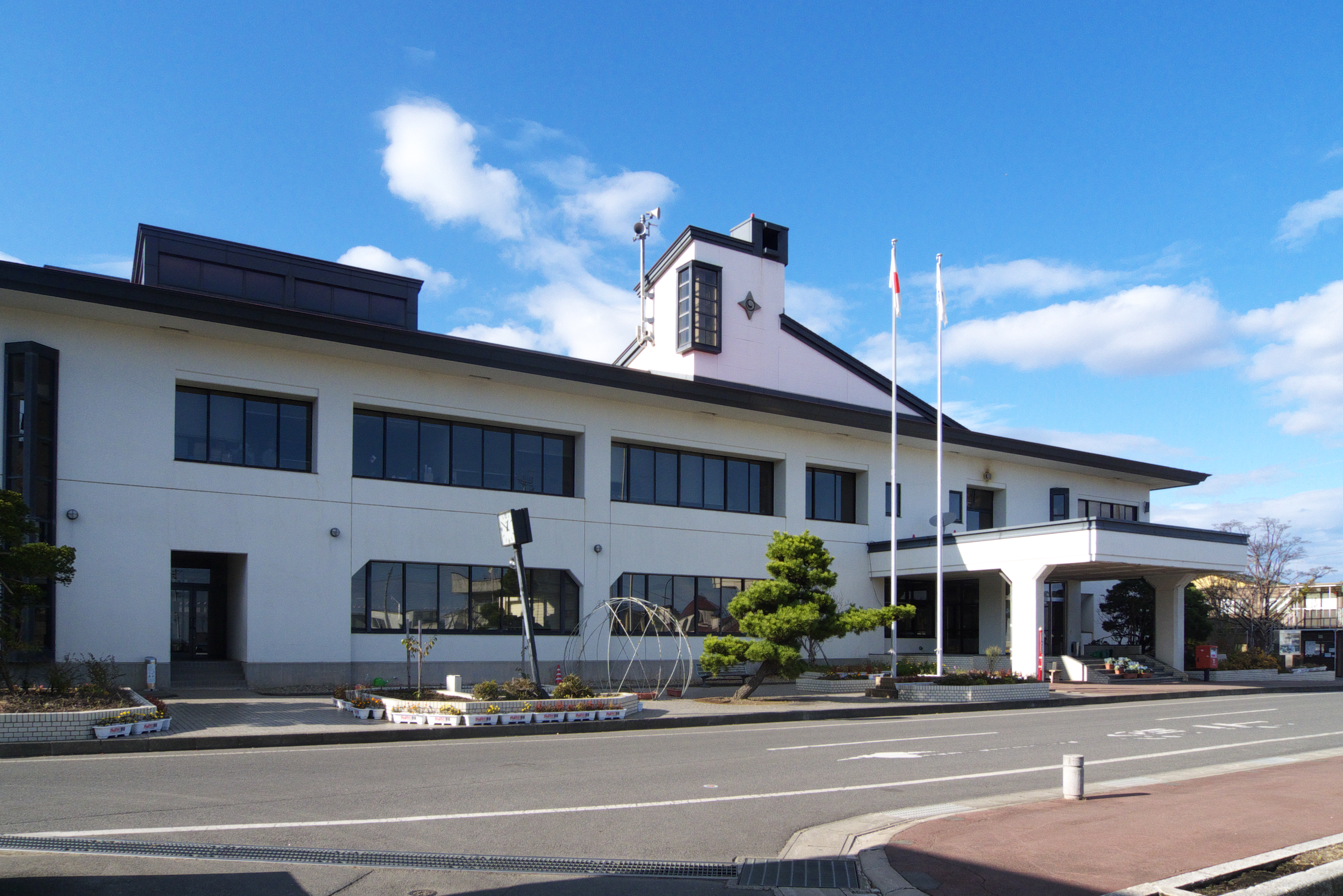
- Noda Village Hall

- Flag Seal

- Location of Noda in Iwate Prefecture

- Coordinates: 40°06′37.1″N 141°49′3.7″E
- Country: Japan
- Region: Tōhoku
- Prefecture: Iwate
- District: Kunohe

Area
  - Total: 80.80 km^{2} (31.20 sq mi)

Population (March 31, 2020)
  - Total: 4,201
  - Density: 51.99/km^{2} (134.7/sq mi)
- Time zone: UTC+9 (Japan Standard Time)
- Phone number: 0194-78-2111
- Address: Noda dai-20 jiwari 14, Noda-mura, Kunohe-gun, Iwate 028-8201
- Website: Official website

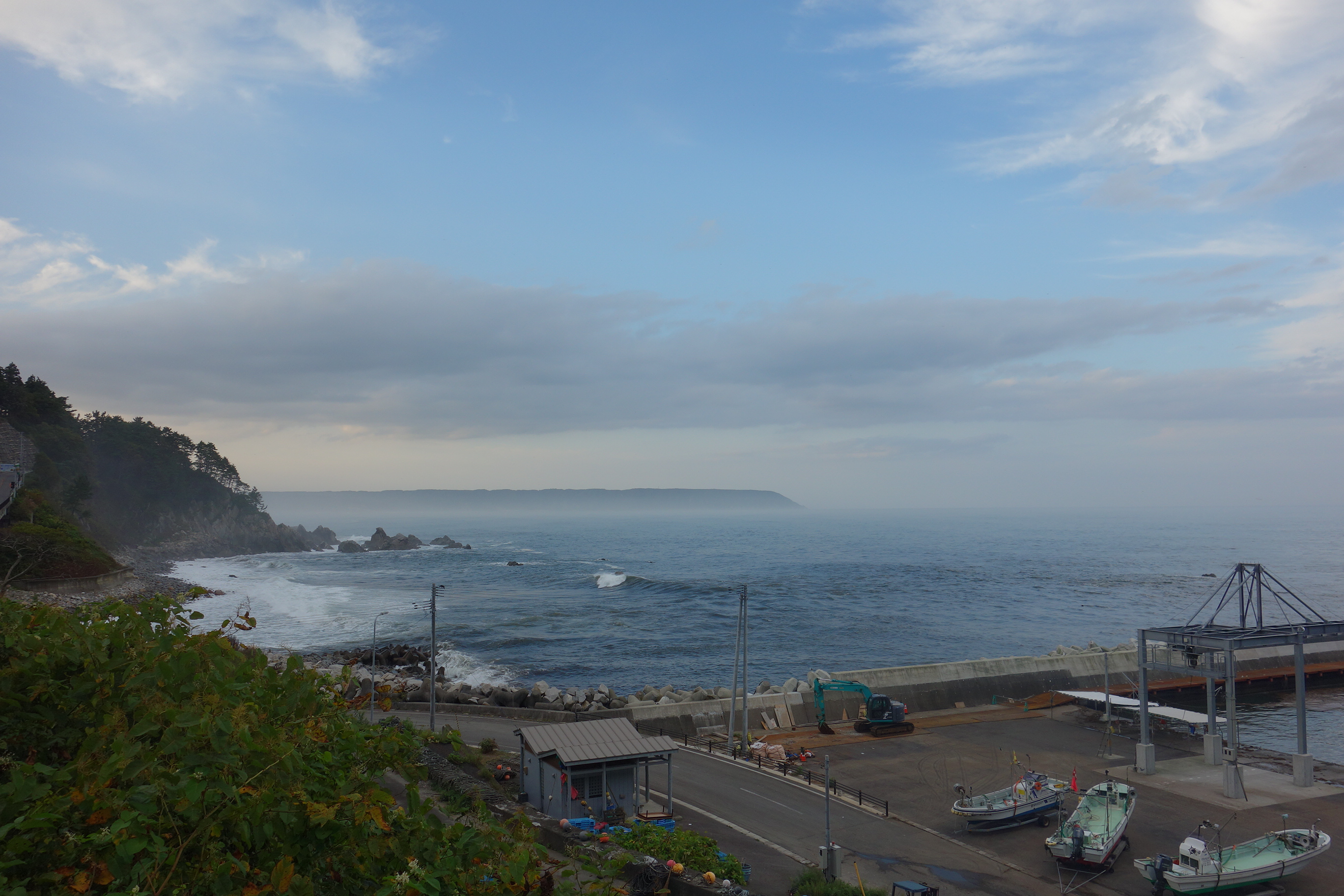
Noda Bay

Noda (野田村, Noda-mura) is a village located in Iwate Prefecture, Japan. As of 31 March 2020, the village had an estimated population of 4,201, and a population density of 52 persons per km^{2} in 1660 households. The total area of the village is 80.84 square kilometres (31.21 sq mi).

== Geography ==
Noda is located in far northeastern Iwate Prefecture, bordered by the Pacific Ocean to the east. The western portion of the village is within the Kitakami Mountains. Parts of the coastline of Noda are within the borders of the Sanriku Fukkō National Park.

=== Neighboring municipalities ===
Iwate Prefecture

- Fudai
- Iwaizumi
- Kuji

=== Climate ===
Noda has a cold oceanic climate (Köppen climate classification Cfb) characterized by mild summers and cold winters with heavy snowfall. The average annual temperature in Noda is 8.7 °C. The average annual rainfall is 1273 mm with September as the wettest month and February as the driest month. The temperatures are highest on average in August, at around 21.4 °C, and lowest in January, at around -2.9 °C.

== Demographics ==
Per Japanese census data, the population of Noda peaked in around 1960 and has declined steadily over the past 60 years.

Historical population
Year	Pop.	±%
1920	3,394	—
1930	3,893	+14.7%
1940	4,301	+10.5%
1950	5,476	+27.3%
1960	5,935	+8.4%
1970	5,863	−1.2%
1980	5,304	−9.5%
1990	5,285	−0.4%
2000	5,195	−1.7%
2010	4,632	−10.8%
2020	3,936	−15.0%

== History ==
The area of present-day Noda was part of ancient Mutsu Province, dominated by the Nambu clan from the Muromachi period, and part of Hachinohe Domain under the Edo period Tokugawa shogunate. During the early Meiji period, the village of Noda was created within Kita-Kunohe District on April 1, 1889, with the establishment of the modern municipalities system. The area was swept by the tsunami created by the 1896 Sanriku earthquake, which killed 261 villagers and destroyed 411 houses. Kita-Kunohe District and Minami-Kunohe Districts merged to form Kunohe District on April 1, 1897. The village again suffered from the effects the tsunami of the 1933 Sanriku earthquake, which killed seven people and destroyed 58 houses. The 2011 Tōhoku earthquake and tsunami also created extensive damage.

== Government ==
Noda has a mayor-council form of government with a directly elected mayor and a unicameral village council of eight members. Noda, together with the neighboring city of Kuji, contributes two seats to the Iwate Prefectural legislature. In terms of national politics, the village is part of Iwate 2nd district of the lower house of the Diet of Japan.

== Economy ==
The local economy is based on commercial fishing and to a lesser extent on agriculture. The area was formerly noted for its salt production.

== Education ==
Noda has one public elementary school and one public middle school operated by the village government. There is one public high school operated by the Iwate Prefectural Board of Education.

== Transportation ==
=== Railway ===
- Sanriku Railway – Rias Line
  - Noda-Tamagawa - Tofugaura-Kaigan - Rikuchū-Noda

=== Highway ===
- National Route 45
