= Sanriku Railway =

Rail company operating in Iwate Prefecture, Japan

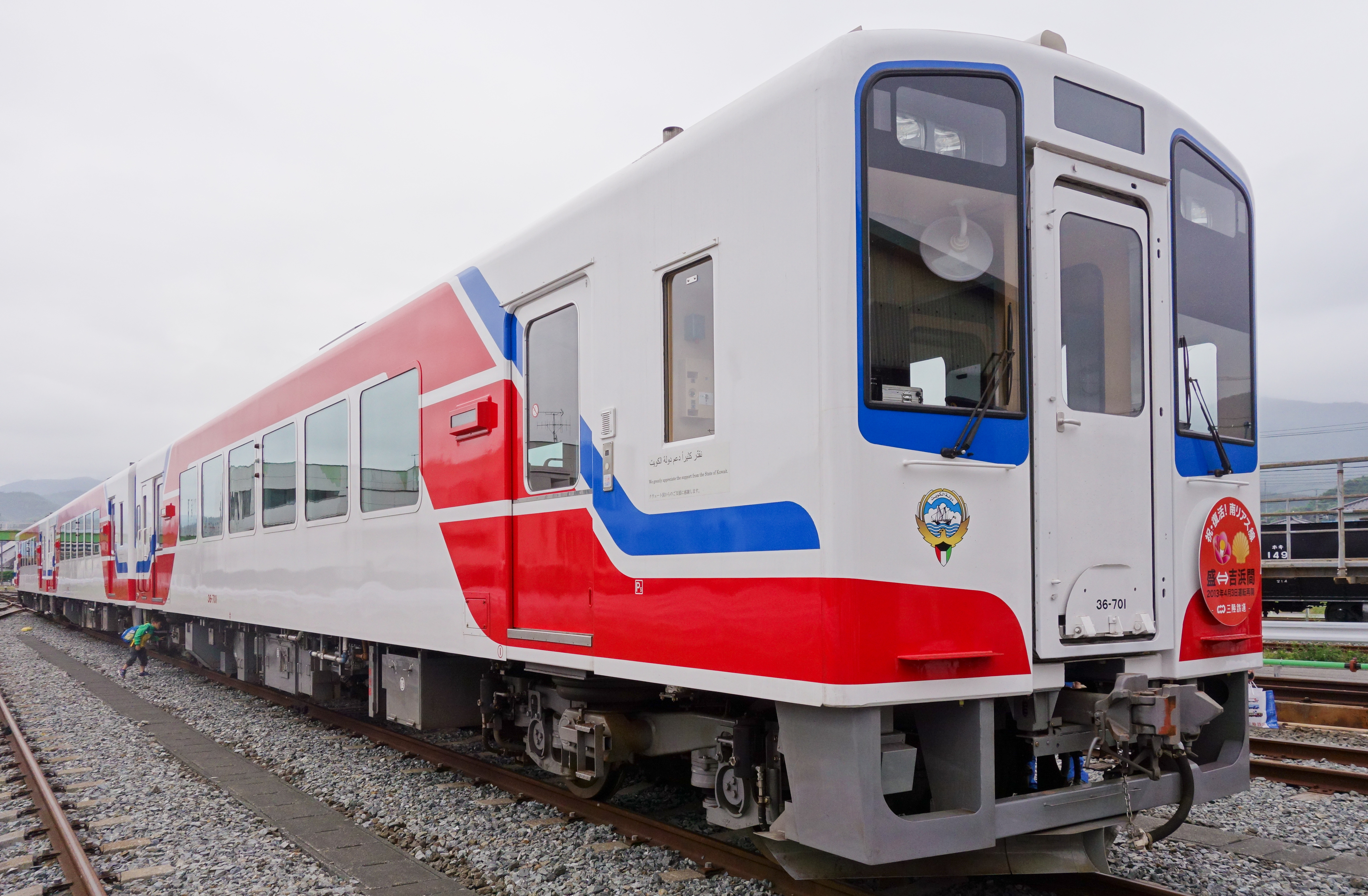
Santetsu 36-700 series DMU

Sanriku Railway (三陸鉄道, Sanriku Tetsudō) is a railway company in Iwate Prefecture in northern Japan. The company and its lines are also known as Santetsu (三鉄). The company was founded in 1981, as the first "third-sector" (half public, half private) railway line in the country, excluding special cases such as freight railways in seaports. Its lines are former Japanese National Railways (JNR) lines, that were going to be closed. Santetsu acquired these lines in 1984. The company also operates a travel agency and other businesses.

== Lines ==
- ■ Rias Line (リアス線 [ja]) (163.0 km, Sakari - Kuji)

== Rias Line ==
Rias Line
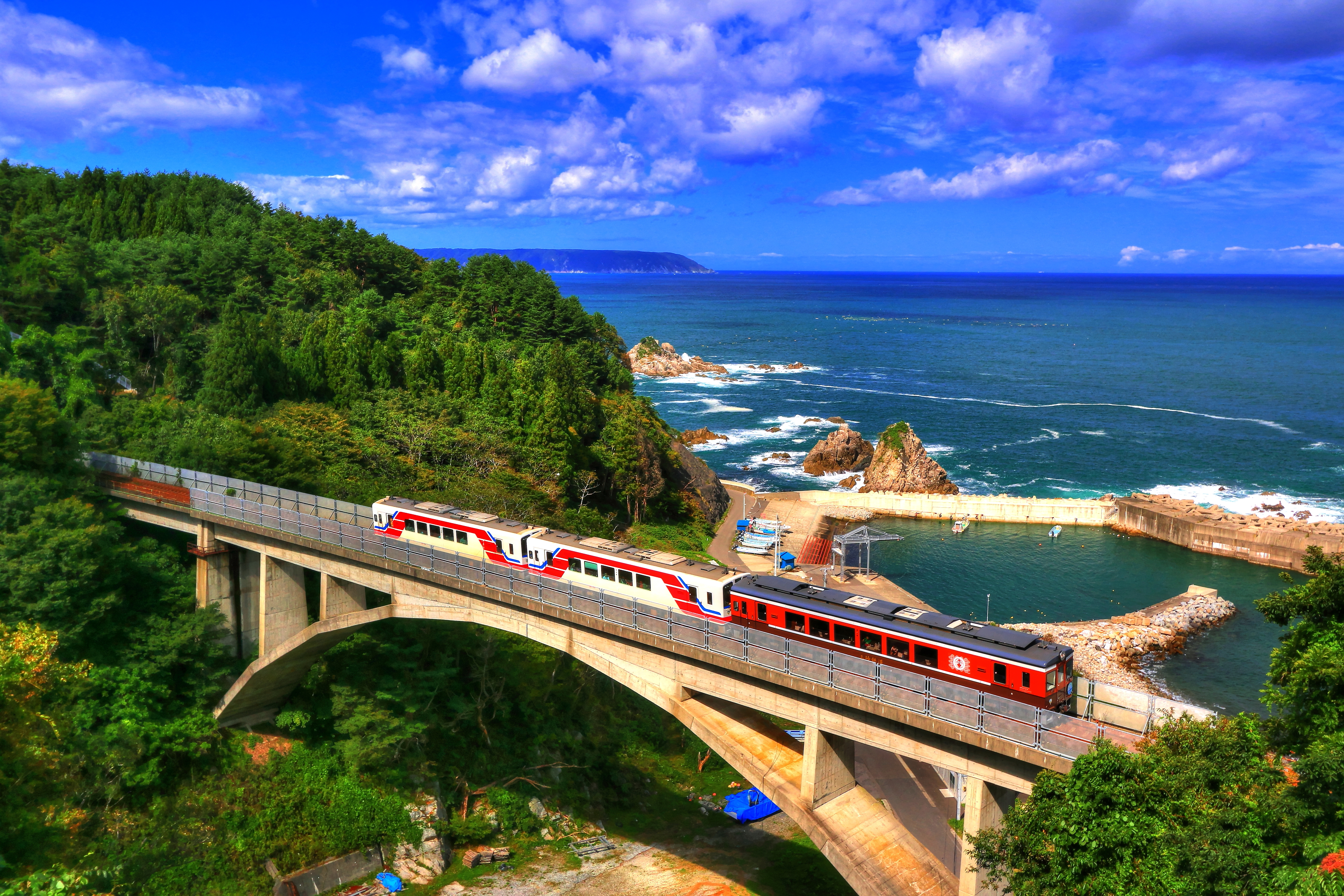
- A train crossing the Ōsawa Viaduct, September 2015

Overview
- Native name: リアス線
- Status: In operation
- Owner: Sanriku Railway
- Locale: Iwate Prefecture
- Termini: Sakari; Kuji
- Stations: 41

Service
- Type: Heavy rail
- Operator(s): Sanriku Railway
- Rolling stock: Sanriku Railway 36 series DMU

History
- Opened: Former JR East Yamada Line joined with Kita-Rias and Minami-Rias Line on 23 March 2019 to make Rias Line

Technical
- Line length: 163.0 km (101.3 mi)
- Number of tracks: Entire line single tracked
- Character: Rural
- Track gauge: 1,067 mm (3 ft 6 in)
- Electrification: None
- Operating speed: 90 km/h (56 mph)

Line map Red:Kita-Riasu Line Blue:Minami-Riasu Line

=== Operation ===
All services on the line are Local trains, stopping at every station.

The line operates in three sections:

- Sakari — Kamaishi (running time ~ 47-53 min)
- Kamaishi — Miyako (running time ~ 80-90 min)
- Miyako — Kuji (running time ~ 90-110 min)

As of September 2025, most services operate in only one section of the line, with a change of train required to continue travel. Some services operate on two sections of the line, while only one service in each direction travels on all three sections of the line (i.e. the entire line between Sakari & Kuji).

Services operate approximately every 1–2 hours. All sections of the line have a similar level of service with 11 or 12 trips in each direction every day.

=== Station list ===
Station		Distance (km)		Transfers	Location
Name	Japanese	Between Stations	Total	Transfers	Location
Sakari	盛	-	0.0	■ Ōfunato Line BRT service	Ōfunato, Iwate
Rikuzen-Akasaki	陸前赤崎	3.7	3.7		Ōfunato, Iwate
Ryōri	綾里	5.4	9.1		Ōfunato, Iwate
Koishihama	恋し浜	2.9	12.0		Ōfunato, Iwate
Horei	甫嶺	2.3	14.3		Ōfunato, Iwate
Sanriku	三陸	2.7	17.0		Ōfunato, Iwate
Yoshihama	吉浜	4.6	21.6		Ōfunato, Iwate
Tōni	唐丹	6.1	27.7		Kamaishi, Iwate
Heita	平田	5.4	33.1		Kamaishi, Iwate
Kamaishi	釜石	3.5	36.6	■ Kamaishi Line	Kamaishi, Iwate
Ryōishi	両石	6.1	42.7		Kamaishi, Iwate
Unosumai	鵜住居	2.2	44.9		Kamaishi, Iwate
Ōtsuchi	大槌	4.0	48.9		Ōtsuchi, Iwate
Kirikiri	吉里吉里	3.4	52.3		Ōtsuchi, Iwate
Namiita-Kaigan	浪板海岸	1.8	54.1		Ōtsuchi, Iwate
Iwate-Funakoshi	岩手船越	6.4	60.5		Yamada, Iwate
Orikasa	織笠	3.8	63.3		Yamada, Iwate
Rikuchū-Yamada	陸中山田	1.2	65.5		Yamada, Iwate
Toyomane	豊間根	11.1	76.6		Yamada, Iwate
Haraigawa	払川	4.1	80.7		Miyako, Iwate
Tsugaruishi	津軽石	2.1	82.8		Miyako, Iwate
Yagisawa-Miyakotandai	八木沢・宮古短大駅	5.4	88.2		Miyako, Iwate
Sokei	磯鶏	1.8	90.0		Miyako, Iwate
Miyako	宮古	2.0	92.0	■ Yamada Line	Miyako, Iwate
Yamaguchi Danchi	山口団地	1.6	93.6		Miyako, Iwate
Ichinowatari	一の渡	4.6	98.2		Miyako, Iwate
Sabane	佐羽根	2.9	101.1		Miyako, Iwate
Tarō	田老	3.6	104.7		Miyako, Iwate
Shin-Tarō	新田老	0.5	105.2		Miyako, Iwate
Settai	摂待	8.3	113.5		Miyako, Iwate
Iwaizumi-Omoto	岩泉小本	3.6	117.1		Iwaizumi, Iwate
Shimanokoshi	島越	8.5	125.6		Tanohata, Iwate
Tanohata	田野畑	2.0	127.6		Tanohata, Iwate
Fudai	普代	9.3	136.9		Fudai, Iwate
Shiraikaigan	白井海岸	3.4	140.3		Fudai, Iwate
Horinai	堀内	3.1	143.4		Fudai, Iwate
Noda-Tamagawa	野田玉川	4.5	147.9		Noda, Iwate
Tofugaura-Kaigan	十府ヶ浦海岸	1.7	149.6		Noda, Iwate
Rikuchū-Noda	陸中野田	2.3	151.9		Noda, Iwate
Rikuchū-Ube	陸中宇部	3.4	155.3		Kuji, Iwate
Kuji	久慈	7.7	163.0	■ Hachinohe Line	Kuji, Iwate

== History ==
=== Kita-Rias Line ===
The Japanese National Railways (JNR) opened the Miyako to Taro section in 1972 and the Kuji to Fudai section in 1975. It constructed the Taro to Fudai section, and transferred the entire line to Sanriku on the day it opened in 1984. The line features 42 tunnels, including the Masaki (6,532 m) and Omoto (5,174 m) tunnels, both opened in 1984.

=== Minami-Rias Line ===
JNR opened the Sakari to Ryori section in 1970, extending the line to Yoshihama in 1973. It constructed the section to Kamaishi and transferred the entire line to Sanriku on the day it opened in 1984. The line features 20 tunnels.

=== 2011 earthquake and tsunami damage ===
Both lines were heavily damaged by the 2011 Tōhoku earthquake and tsunami. The two lines suffered damage at ~300 locations, including damage to station buildings and bridges. The tsunami washed away 5.8 km of railway tracks on the lines. Full restoration of service on the lines was completed in April 2014.

Diesel railcars damaged by the earthquake and tsunami were replaced by three new diesel railcars funded by Kuwait. The new cars were introduced in January 2014.

The two sections of the Sanriku Railway were for a long time separated by a destroyed segment of the Yamada Line.

On 23 March 2019, the Yamada Line section from Miyako to Kamaishi was reopened and transferred to Sanriku Railway. This joined up with the Kita-Rias Line on one side and the Minami-Rias Line on the other, which together constitutes the entire Rias Line restored. The result is a resumption of continuous rail service between Kuji and Sakari Station where it links with the Ōfunato Line.

=== Typhoon Hagibis damage ===
Following the Typhoon Hagibis in 2019 which caused further damage to the railway, the operator Sanriku Railway Co,.Ltd. have received around ¥40 million in donations to help with repairs.

== See also ==
- List of railway companies in Japan
