= Unosumai Station =

Railway station in Kamaishi, Iwate Prefecture, Japan

Coordinates: 39.3271°N 141.8881°E

Unosumai Station 鵜住居駅
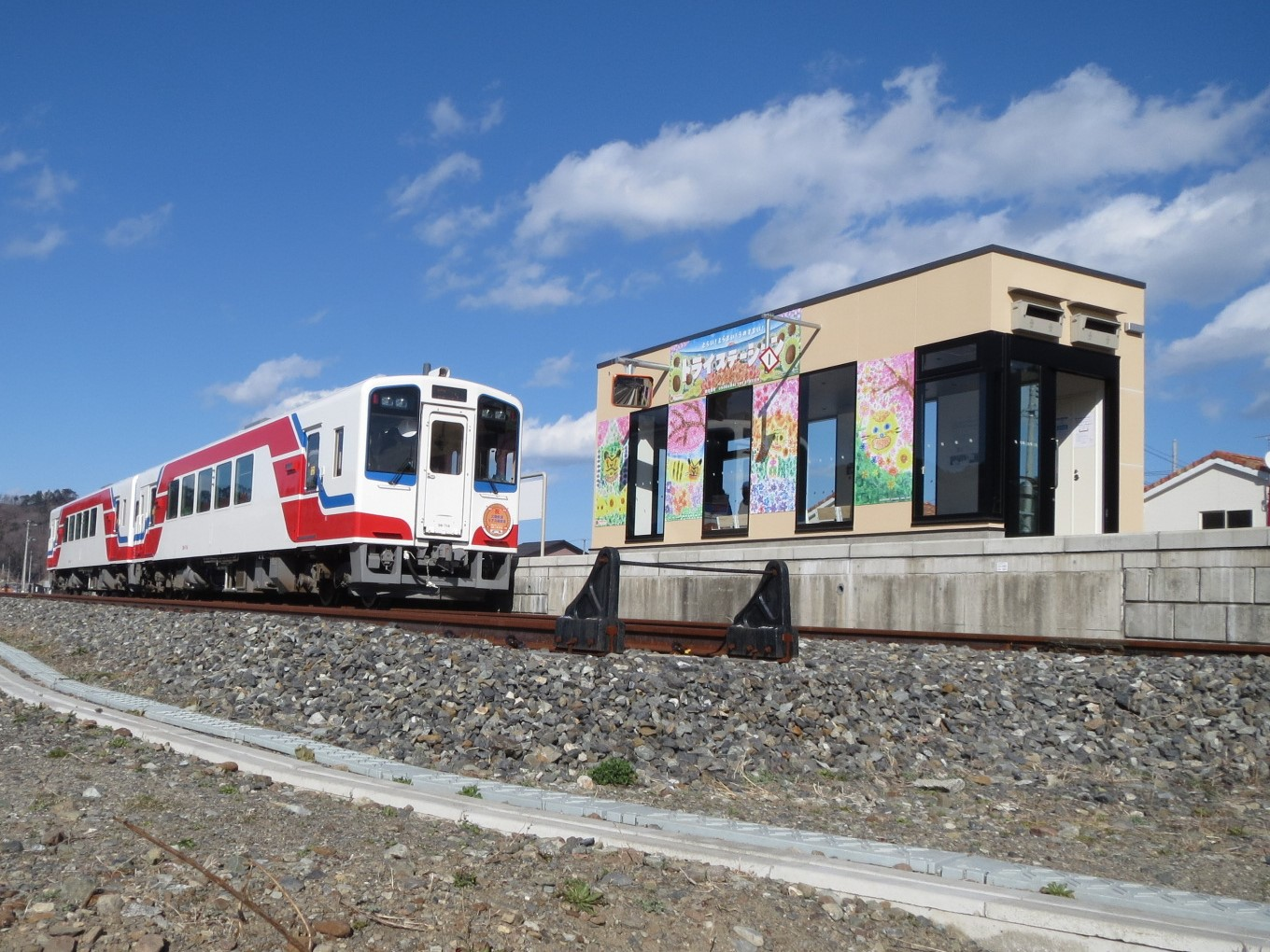
- Unosumai Station in May 2019

General information
- Location: Unosumai-chō 16, Kamaishi, Iwate （岩手県釜石市鵜住居町16） Japan
- Operator: Sanriku Railway
- Line: ■ Rias Line
- Distance: 44.9 km from Sakari

History
- Opened: 1939
Location

Unosumai Station (鵜住居駅, Unosumai-eki) is a Sanriku Railway Company railway station located in Kamaishi, Iwate Prefecture, Japan.

== Lines ==
Unosumai Station is served by the Rias Line. Formerly, it was served by the Yamada Line. The station was located 44.9 rail kilometers from the terminus of the line at Sakari Station.

== Station layout ==
Unosumai Station had a single island platform connected to the station building, by an underground passage. The station was unattended.

=== Platforms ===
1	■ Rias Line	for Miyako , and Kuji
2	■ Rias Line	for Kamaishi , and Sakari

== Adjacent stations ==
«	Service	»
Rias Line
Ryōishi	-	Ōtsuchi

== History ==
Unosumai Station opened on 17 September 1939. The station was absorbed into the JR East network upon the privatization of the Japan National Railways (JNR) on 1 April 1987. The station (along with most of the surrounding area) was destroyed by the 11 March 2011 Tōhoku earthquake and tsunami.

As of 2018, the station have been rebuilt along with the rest of the closed segment of the Yamada Line. It was transferred to the Sanriku Railway upon completion on 23 March 2019. This segment joined up with the Kita-Rias Line on one side and the Minami-Rias Line on the other, which together constitutes the entire Rias Line. Accordingly, this station became an intermediate station of Rias Line.

== Surrounding area ==
- National Route 45
