= Rikuzen-Akasaki Station =

Railway station in Ōfunato, Iwate Prefecture, Japan

Rikuzen-Akasaki Station 陸前赤崎駅
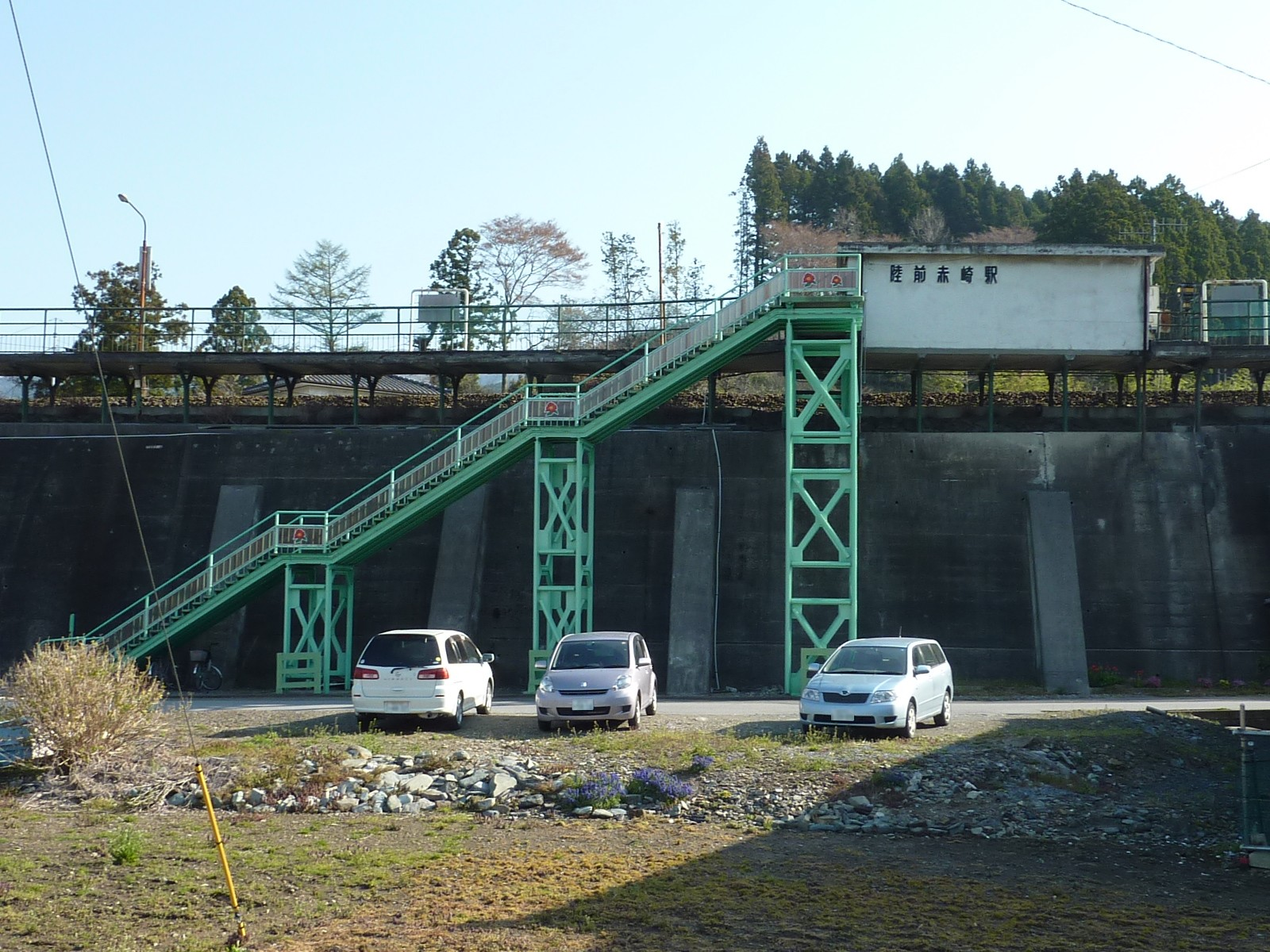
- Rikuzen-Akasaki Station in May 2010

General information
- Location: Akasaki-cho Daido, Ōfunato-shi, Iwate-ken 022-0007; Japan
- Coordinates: 39°04′6.8″N 141°44′27.7″E
- Operator: Sanriku Railway
- Line: ■ Rias Line
- Distance: 3.7 km from Sakari
- Platforms: 1 side platform
- Tracks: 1

Other information
- Status: Unstaffed
- Website: Official website

History
- Opened: 1 March 1970
- Former names: 2
Location
- Location within Japan

Rikuzen Akasaki Station (陸前赤崎駅, Rikuzen-Akasaki-eki) is a railway station on the Sanriku Railway Company’s Rias Line located in the city of Ōfunato, Iwate Prefecture, Japan. It is 3.7 rail kilometers from the terminus of the line at Sakari Station.

== Station layout ==
Rikuzen-Akasaki Station has one elevated side platform serving a single bi-directional track. There is no station building, but only a shelter on the platform.

== History ==
Rikuzen-Akasaki Station opened on 1 March 1970 as a station on the Japan National Railway (JNR). It was privatized on 1 April 1984, becoming a station on the Sanriku Railway. During the 11 March 2011 Tōhoku earthquake and tsunami, part of the tracks on the Minami-Rias Line were swept away, thus suspending services. The line resumed operations on 3 April 2013 between Sakari and Yoshihama). Services between Yoshihama and Kamaishi resumed on 5 April 2014. Minami-Rias Line, a portion of Yamada Line, and Kita-Rias Line constitute Rias Line on 23 March 2019. Accordingly, this station became an intermediate station of Rias Line.

== Adjacent stations ==
←	Service	→
Sanriku Railway Company
Sakari	Local	Ryōri

== Surrounding area ==
- Port of Ōfunato

== See also ==
- List of railway stations in Japan
