= Tanohata Station =

Railway station in Tanohata, Iwate Prefecture, Japan

Tanohata Station 田野畑駅
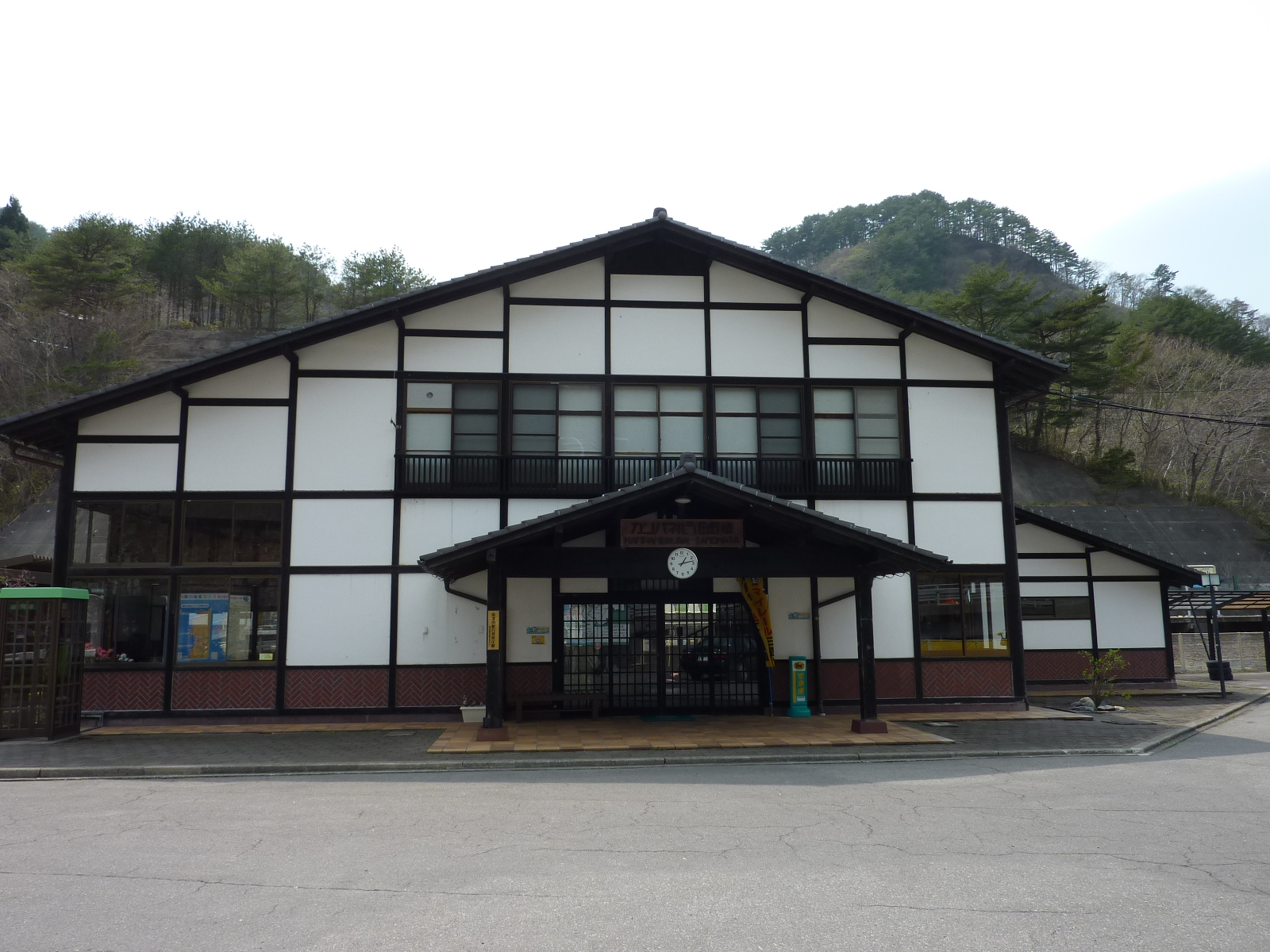
- Tanohata Station in March 2010

General information
- Location: Wano Dai-2 jiwari 46-16, Tanohata-mura, Shimohei-gun, Iwate-ken 028-8407; Japan
- Coordinates: 39°56′2.44″N 141°56′1.35″E
- Operator: Sanriku Railway Company
- Line: ■ Rias Line
- Distance: 127.6 km from Sakari
- Platforms: 1 island platform
- Tracks: 2

Construction
- Structure type: At grade

Other information
- Status: Unstaffed
- Website: Official website

History
- Opened: 1 April 1984
Location
- Location within Japan

Tanohata Station (田野畑駅, Tanohata-eki) is a railway station on the Sanriku Railway Company’s Rias Line located in the village of Tanohata, Iwate Prefecture, Japan.

== Lines ==
Tanohata Station is served by the Rias Line, and is located 127.6 rail kilometers from the terminus of the line at Sakari Station.

== Station layout ==
The station has one island platform. The station is staffed.

=== Platforms ===
1	■ Sanriku Railway	for Miyako, Kamaishi, and Sakari
2	■ Sanriku Railway	for Kuji

== Adjacent stations ==
←	Service	→
Sanriku Railway Company
Shimanokoshi	Local	Fudai

== History ==
Tanohata Station opened on 1 April 1984, the same day of the privatization of the Japan National Railway (JNR) Kuji Line (which became the Sanriku Railway Company). During the 11 March 2011 Tōhoku earthquake and tsunami, much of the surrounding area was destroyed by a 20 metres (66 ft) tsunami, which also swept away parts of the tracks and suspending services on a portion of the Sanriku Railway. However, the station building survived, and the portion of the line from Rikuchū-Noda to Tanohata resumed operations on 1 April 2012., and services were extended to Omoto on 6 April 2014.。The station was used as the set for the fictional “Hatano Station” in the NHK morning television drama Amachan which aired from April to September 2013. Minami-Rias Line, a portion of Yamada Line, and Kita-Rias Line constitute Rias Line on 23 March 2019. Accordingly, this station became an intermediate station of Rias Line.

== Surrounding area ==
- Hiraiga Post Office

== See also ==
- List of railway stations in Japan
