= Fudai, Iwate =

Fudai 普代村
- Village
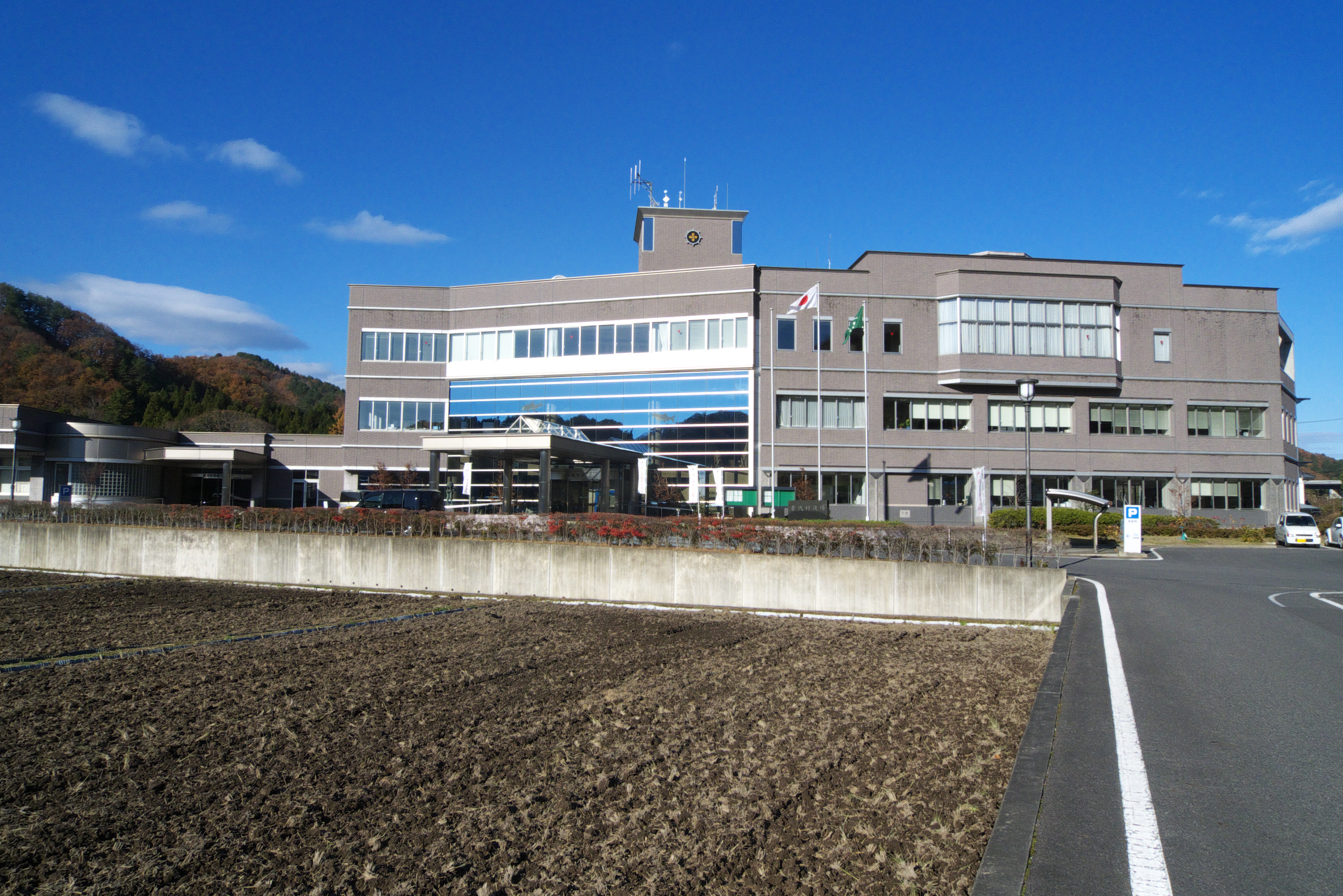
- Fudai Village Hall

- Flag Seal

- Location of Fudai in Iwate Prefecture

- Coordinates: 40°00′18.8″N 141°53′9.4″E
- Country: Japan
- Region: Tōhoku
- Prefecture: Iwate
- District: Shimohei

Area
  - Total: 69.66 km^{2} (26.90 sq mi)

Population (March 31, 2020)
  - Total: 2,607
  - Density: 37.42/km^{2} (96.93/sq mi)
- Time zone: UTC+9 (Japan Standard Time)
- Phone number: 0194-35-2111
- Address: Dai-9 jiwari Doya 13-2, Fudai-mura, Shimohei-gun, Iwate 028-8392
- Climate: Cfb
- Website: Official website
- Symbols
- Bird: Japanese cormorant
- Flower: Bay Lily
- Tree: Japanese pagoda tree

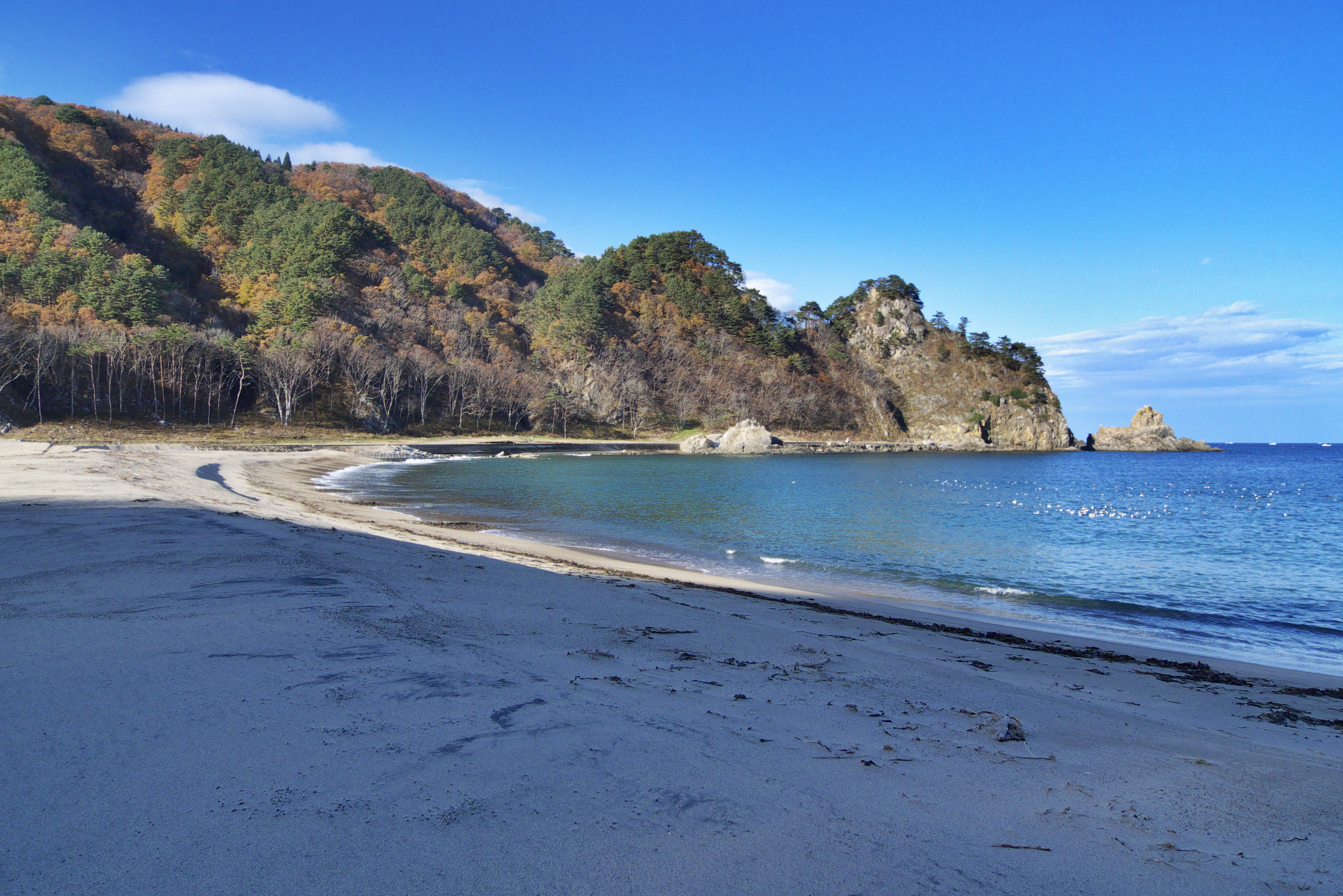
Fudaihama coastline

Fudai (普代村, Fudai-mura) is a village located in Iwate Prefecture, Japan. As of 1 June 2019, the village had an estimated population of 2,607, and a population density of 37.4 persons per km^{2} in 1,126 households. The total area of the village is 69.66 square kilometres (26.90 sq mi).

== Geography ==
Fudai is a coastal mountainous community situated on the Sanriku Coast ria along the Pacific Ocean in northern Iwate. The southern part of the village, an area called Kurosaki (黒崎), included a part of the Rikuchu Kaigan National Park, which is now part of the Sanriku Fukkō National Park. It features an observation point to view scenic 100-metre (330 ft) seaside cliffs.

=== Neighboring municipalities ===
Iwate Prefecture

- Iwaizumi
- Noda
- Tanohata

=== Climate ===
Fudai has a cold humid subtropical climate (Köppen climate classification Cfa) characterized by mild summers and cold winters. The average annual temperature in Fudai is 10.1 °C. The average annual rainfall is 1201 mm with September as the wettest month and February as the driest month. The temperatures are highest on average in August, at around 22.6 °C, and lowest in January, at around -1.1 °C.

Climate data for Fudai (1991−2020 normals, extremes 1976−present)
Month	Jan	Feb	Mar	Apr	May	Jun	Jul	Aug	Sep	Oct	Nov	Dec	Year
Record high °C (°F)	16.6 (61.9)	21.4 (70.5)	23.9 (75.0)	32.2 (90.0)	32.9 (91.2)	33.0 (91.4)	35.9 (96.6)	37.7 (99.9)	34.9 (94.8)	31.1 (88.0)	24.1 (75.4)	22.8 (73.0)	37.7 (99.9)
Mean daily maximum °C (°F)	4.3 (39.7)	4.7 (40.5)	8.4 (47.1)	14.2 (57.6)	18.7 (65.7)	21.0 (69.8)	24.6 (76.3)	26.3 (79.3)	23.5 (74.3)	18.6 (65.5)	13.2 (55.8)	7.0 (44.6)	15.4 (59.7)
Daily mean °C (°F)	−0.7 (30.7)	−0.4 (31.3)	2.8 (37.0)	8.1 (46.6)	12.8 (55.0)	16.1 (61.0)	20.1 (68.2)	21.7 (71.1)	18.5 (65.3)	12.5 (54.5)	6.7 (44.1)	1.6 (34.9)	10.0 (50.0)
Mean daily minimum °C (°F)	−5.3 (22.5)	−5.4 (22.3)	−2.6 (27.3)	1.9 (35.4)	7.3 (45.1)	11.9 (53.4)	16.7 (62.1)	18.1 (64.6)	14.2 (57.6)	7.2 (45.0)	1.0 (33.8)	−3.1 (26.4)	5.2 (41.3)
Record low °C (°F)	−17.3 (0.9)	−20.4 (−4.7)	−13.7 (7.3)	−6.9 (19.6)	−2.5 (27.5)	0.1 (32.2)	5.9 (42.6)	6.9 (44.4)	4.1 (39.4)	−3.7 (25.3)	−7.6 (18.3)	−13.5 (7.7)	−20.4 (−4.7)
Average precipitation mm (inches)	66.6 (2.62)	62.4 (2.46)	88.5 (3.48)	86.0 (3.39)	102.3 (4.03)	144.2 (5.68)	167.1 (6.58)	195.5 (7.70)	224.1 (8.82)	170.1 (6.70)	61.3 (2.41)	64.8 (2.55)	1,430.5 (56.32)
Average precipitation days (≥ 1.0 mm)	5.1	5.9	7.7	7.9	9.8	10.3	12.9	12.6	11.5	7.9	6.0	5.0	102.6
Mean monthly sunshine hours	158.2	157.5	185.7	196.5	198.4	167.2	141.7	155.1	139.2	151.0	151.2	147.1	1,948.8
Source: Japan Meteorological Agency

== Demographics ==
Per Japanese census data, the population of Fudai has declined over the past 60 years.

Fudai has been recognized by Japan's Office for the Promotion of Regional Revitalization (Kishida Cabinet Secretariat), which promotes the development of new technologies to combat depopulation, for meeting a "high standard" of digital transformation/telework infrastructure. Related projects have been awarded over ¥4.8M in government grants.

Historical population
Year	Pop.	±%
1920	2,463	—
1930	2,940	+19.4%
1940	3,201	+8.9%
1950	3,903	+21.9%
1960	4,603	+17.9%
1970	4,162	−9.6%
1980	4,023	−3.3%
1990	3,909	−2.8%
2000	3,583	−8.3%
2010	3,088	−13.8%
2020	2,487	−19.5%

== History ==
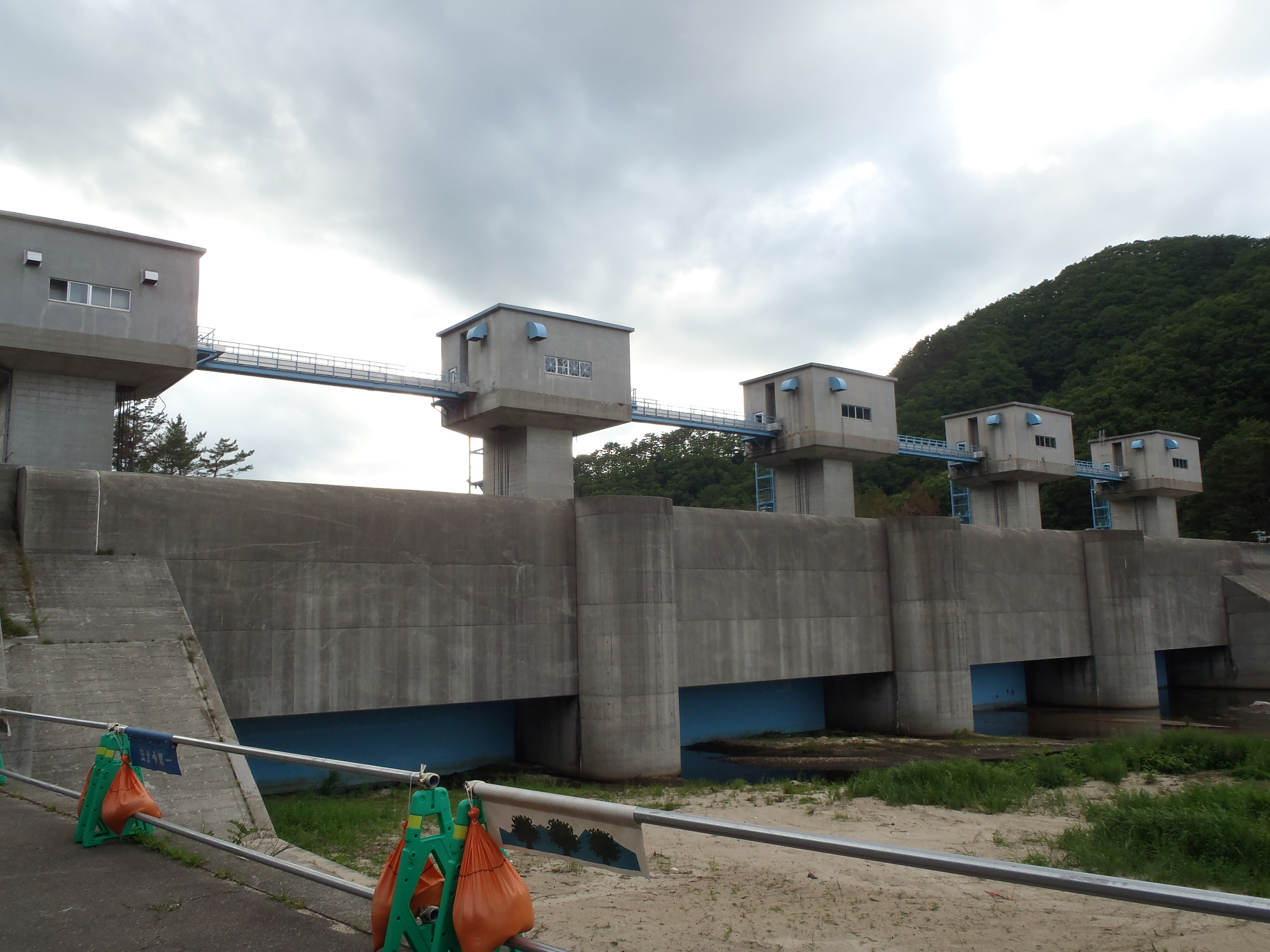
Fudai's floodgate, 4 August 2011. The village escaped destruction during the 2011 Tōhoku earthquake and tsunami as a result of the protection afforded by the floodgate.

The area of present-day Fudai was part of ancient Mutsu Province, dominated by the Nambu clan during the Edo period, who ruled Hachinohe Domain under the Tokugawa shogunate. With the Meiji period establishment of the modern municipalities system, the village of Fudai was created within Kitahei District on April 1, 1889. Kitahei, Nakahei and Higashihei Districts were all merged into Minamihei District on March 29, 1896.

In 1953, the national and prefectural governments targeted Fudai for consolidation with its southern neighbor, Tanohata following the Law for the Consolidation of Cities, Towns and Villages ("the great Shōwa mergers"). Merger talks continued intermittently between 1955 and 1960. The Tanohata delegation was not in favor of the merger, but because of the pressure from the prefecture to implement the government directive, they felt they were not at liberty to directly reject the proposal. At a party in May 1960 to celebrate the end of the long merger negotiations, the mayor of Tanohata drunkenly insulted the delegates from Fudai in a final effort to scuttle the negotiations. The party was abandoned, and no further serious attempts were made to continue with the merger.

=== 2011 tsunami ===
External videos
- Reports containing videos of the village, seawall, and floodgate
- Fudai Tsunami Japan 2011 - A city That has Survived on YouTube
- 岩手県普代村を津波から救った堤防と水門 (Dike and floodgate that saved the village from the tsunami.) on YouTube

The village was spared from the devastation brought to other coastal communities following the 2011 Tōhoku earthquake and tsunami thanks to a 15.5-metre (51 ft) floodgate that protected the town. The floodgate was built between 1972 and 1984 at a cost of ¥3.56 billion (approximately US$30 million in 2011) under the administration of Kōtoku Wamura, the village mayor from 1947 to 1987. Initially derided as a waste of public funds, the floodgate protected the village and the inner cove from the worst of the tsunami waves. After the 2011 tsunami, the villagers gave thanks at Wamura's grave. The village's only casualty was one missing person who went to inspect his boat in the fishing port, located outside of the wall's protection, immediately after the earthquake.

== Government ==
Fudai has a mayor-council form of government with a directly elected mayor and a unicameral village council of 14 members. Fudai, together with the city of Miyako, town of Iwaizumi and the villages of Tanohata and Yamada, collectively contributes three seats to the Iwate Prefectural legislature. In terms of national politics, the village is part of Iwate 2nd district of the lower house of the Diet of Japan.

== Economy ==
The local economy is based on commercial fishing and agriculture.

== Education ==
Fudai has one public elementary school and one public junior high school operated by the village government. The village does not have a high school.

== Transportation ==
=== Railway ===
Sanriku Railway – Rias Line

- Fudai - Shiraikaigan - Horinai

=== Highway ===
- Sanriku-kita Jūkan Road
- National Route 45

== Local attractions ==
- Rikuchū-Kurosaki Light – one of the "50 Noteworthy Lighthouses of Japan"
