= Iwate Development Railway =

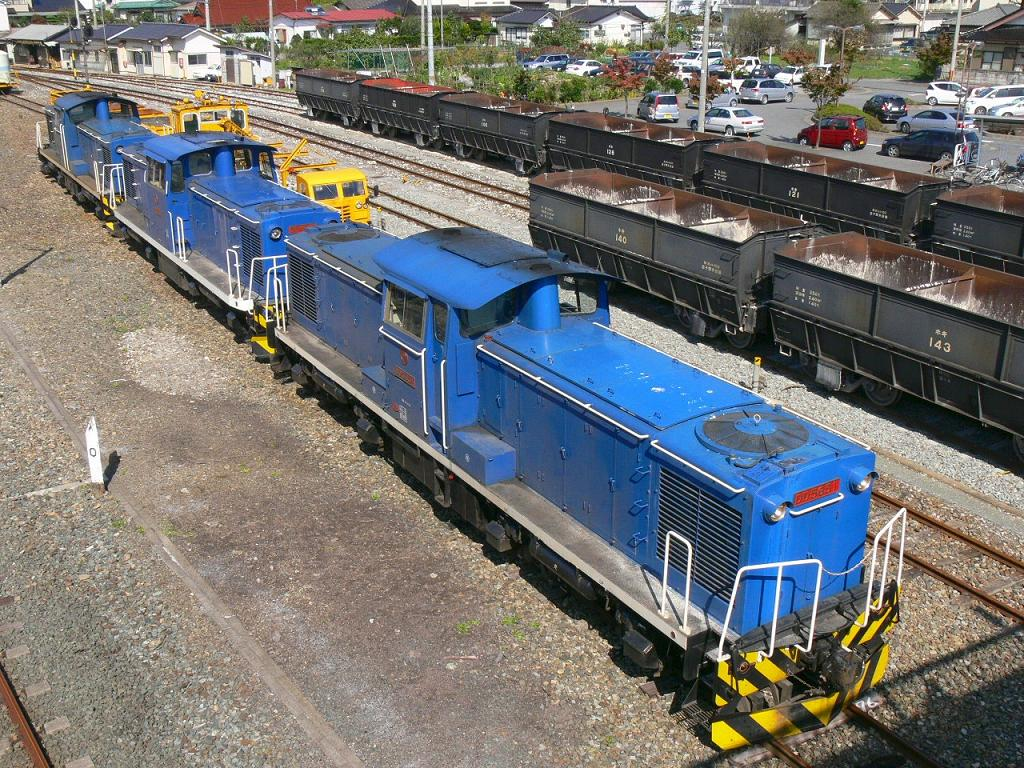
DD56 diesel locomotives at Sakari Station.

The Iwate Development Railway (岩手開発鉄道, Iwate Kaihatsu Tetsudō) is a freight railway company in Ōfunato, Iwate, Japan. This is one of the oldest third sector (half public, half private) railway operator in the country, founded in 1932. Its group also operates bus lines. It also had a passenger service until 1992. The line mainly transports limestones from the mine to Taiheiyō Cement Ōfunato Factory.

== History ==
The Iwate Development Railway started construction of a 6km line to Hikoroichi (日頃市線) in 1941, but work was suspended as a result of the Pacific War. Work recommenced after the war and the line opened in 1950, and was extended 4km to Iwate-Ishibashi in 1960. A 2km freight-only line to Akasaki (赤崎線) opened in 1957. The passenger service ceased in 1992, and the lines are now freight-only.

== See also ==
- List of railway companies in Japan
