= Sakari Station =

Railway station in Ōfunato, Iwate Prefecture, Japan

Sakari Station 盛駅
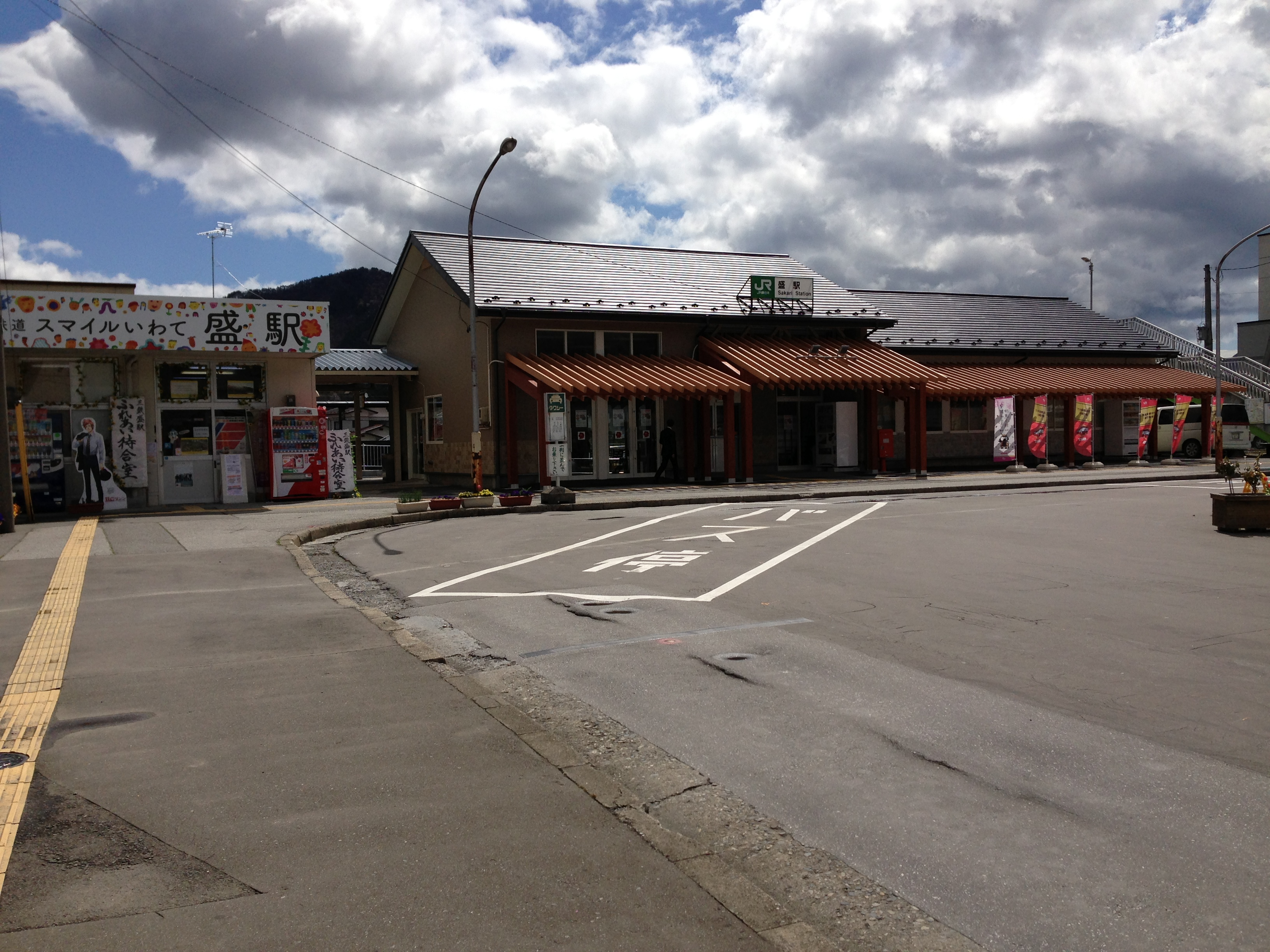
- Sakari Station in May 2013

General information
- Location: 16 Ura, HIgashimachi, Sakari-cho, Ōfunato-shi, Iwate-ken 022-0003; Japan
- Coordinates: 39°05′09″N 141°42′39″E
- Operator: JR East; Sanriku Railway; Iwate Development Railway
- Lines: ■ Ōfunato Line; ■ Sanriku Railway Rias Line; Iwate Development Railway Hikoroichi Line; Iwate Development Railway Akasaki Line
- Platforms: 1 side + 1 island platform

History
- Opened: 19 September 1935

Services
Preceding station	JR East	Following station
Tamoyama towards Maeyachi	Kesennuma / Ōfunato BRT	Terminus
Preceding station	Sanriku Railway	Following station
Terminus	Rias Line	Rikuzen-Akasaki towards Kuji

Former services
Preceding station	JR East	Following station
Ōfunato towards Ichinoseki	Ōfunato Line	Terminus
Location
- Location within Japan

Sakari Station (盛駅, Sakari-eki) is a railway station in the city of Ōfunato in Iwate Prefecture, Japan, jointly operated by East Japan Railway Company (JR East), the third-sector operator Sanriku Railway, and the freight operator Iwate Development Railway.

== Lines ==
Sakari Station is a terminus of the Sanriku Railway Company’s Rias Line and is 163.0 kilometers from the opposing terminus at Kuji. It was also a terminal station for the JR East Ōfunato Line; however all rail services between Kesennuma and Sakari have been suspended indefinitely since the 2011 Tōhoku earthquake and tsunami and have been replaced by a BRT system. The station is also served by the Iwate Development Railway Company for freight operations.

== Station layout ==
Sakari Station has one side platform and one island platform connected to the station building by a footbridge. The station is staffed, and the JR East portion of the station has a Midori no Madoguchi ticket office.

=== Platforms ===
1	■ Ōfunato Line	siding
2	■ Ōfunato Line	for Kesennuma
3	■ Rias Line	for Kamaishi

== History ==
Sakari Station opened on 19 September 1935 as a station on the Ōfunato Line. The Iwate Development Railway Company Hikoroichi Line connected to the station on 21 October 1950 and the Akasaki Line from 21 June 1957. The Minami-Rias Line began operations on 1 March 1970. The Minami-Rias Line was privatized to the Sanriku Railway Company on 1 April 1984, and the Ōfunato Line was privatized on 1 April 1987, becoming part of JR East.

During the 11 March 2011 Tōhoku earthquake and tsunami, the station was flooded and part of the tracks on both the Ōfunato Line and Minami-Rias Line were swept away, thus suspending services. The line resumed operations on the Minami-Rias Line on 3 April 2013 between Sakari and Yoshihama. Services between Yoshihama and Kamaishi resumed on 5 April 2014.

Minami-Rias Line, a portion of Yamada Line, and Kita-Rias Line constitute Rias Line on 23 March 2019. Accordingly, the station became terminus of Rias Line.

== Surrounding area ==
- Ōfunato City Hall
- Ōfunato Post Office
- National Route 45
- National Route 107

== See also ==
- List of railway stations in Japan
