= Firefighting in Japan =

History and current Japanese firefighting

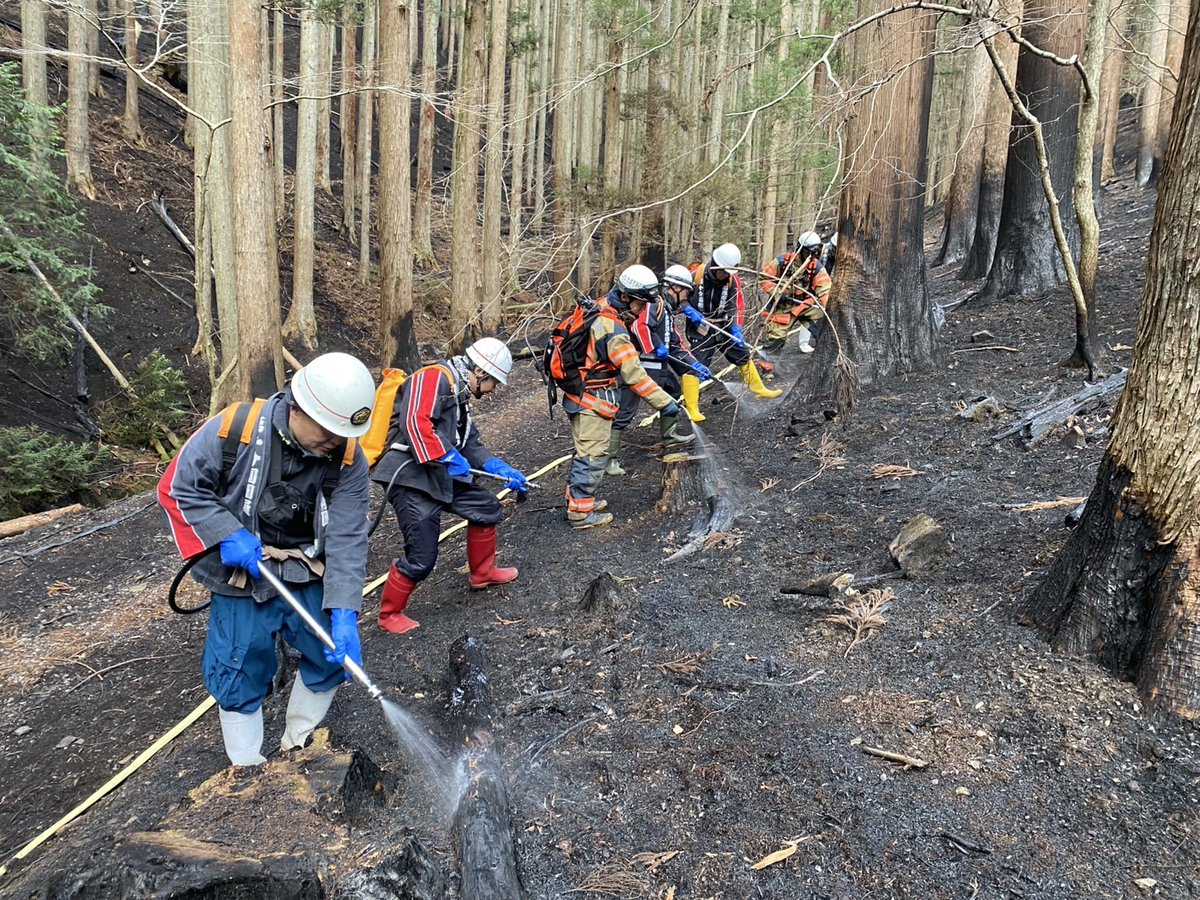
Volunteer and career firefighters work alongside each other to tackle the Ōfunato wildfire.

Firefighting in Japan (Japanese: 消防, Hepburn: Shōbō) is coordinated by local government with assistance and oversight from central government. Organized firefighting was first established in the Edo era to deal with threats posed to government property and power by the frequent devastating fires of the period; it was originally established along the lines of the local feudal system, with samurai and other local officials engaging in firefighting. However, as time went on and Japan adopted a more western-style system of government, organised fire brigades were established similar to those in the western world.

Today, firefighting is mainly provided by professional municipal fire departments, with some assistance from local volunteer fire corps. Fire departments are responsible not only for firefighting, but also for fire safety enforcement, disaster prevention and response, and emergency medical services. Municipalities are responsible for establishing municipal departments and volunteer corps, with assistance and funding provided by prefectures and the Fire and Disaster Management Agency (FDMA).

== History ==
=== Edo period and before ===
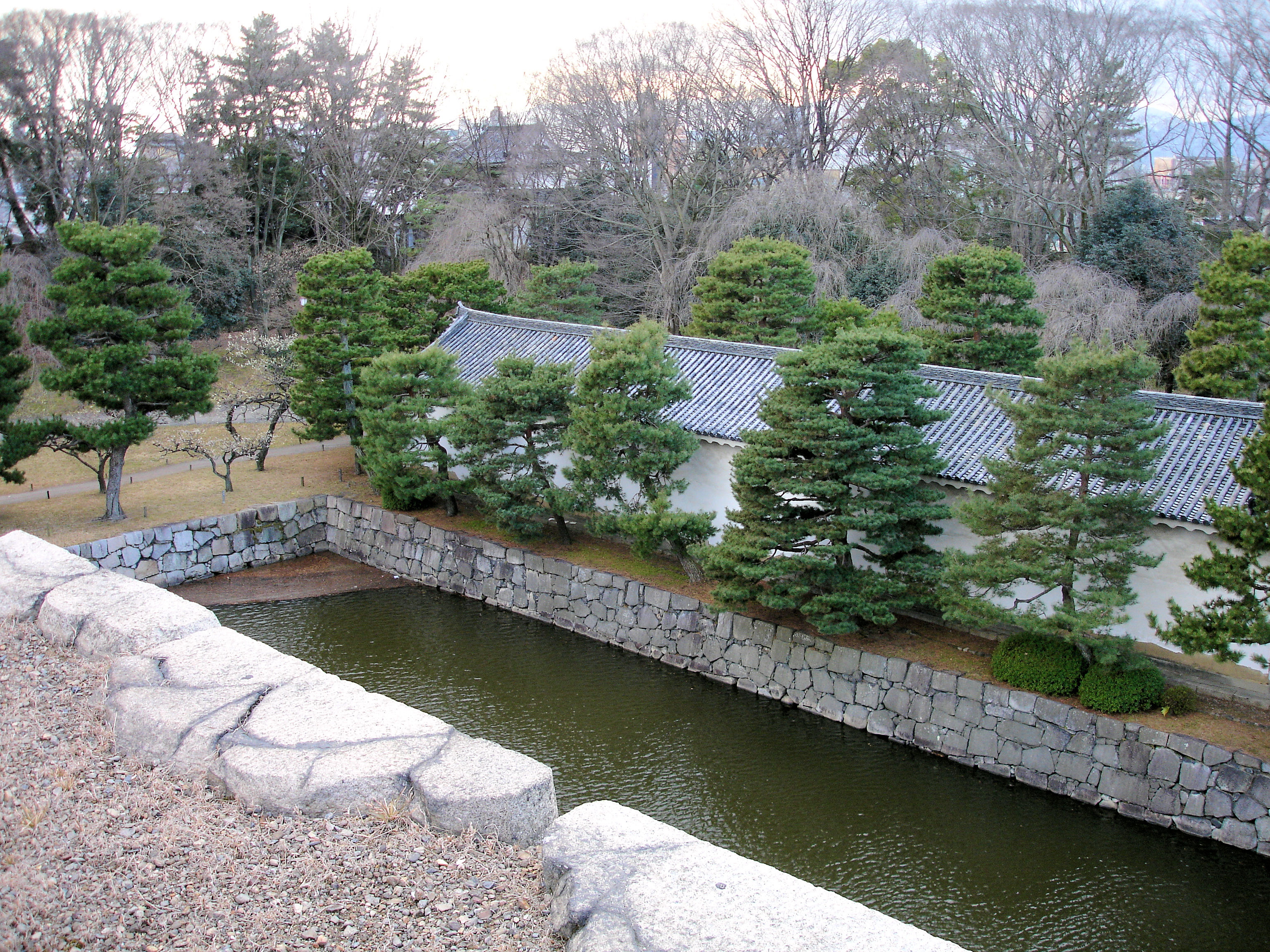
Earthen storehouses (like this one seen at Nijō Castle) were constructed in open outdoor areas away from the flammable buildings of the period.

Prior to the Edo era, there was no organized firefighting organisations, despite frequent devastating conflagrations; these fires found abundant fuel in the buildings of the period, which were mainly constructed with wood and paper as frequent earthquakes and hot summers precluded the use of heavier materials such as stone and brick (which were already in limited supply). Instead, earthen storehouses were used to store valuable goods, and simple wooden construction techniques allowed for easy rebuilding after a fire.

The first firefighting force in Japan is believed to be the hōsho bikeshi, established in 1629, composed of members of more than 10 feudal families. In the event of a fire, the shogun would send a servant to fetch them to fight it; this was evidently a slow process and only yielded a small and unprofessional force, and as a result, the hōsho bikeshi were largely ineffective when confronted with the Fire of Oke-machi in 1641. As a result, the daimyō bikeshi (大名火消) were established in 1643, and were composed of samurai appointed by the local feudal lord or daimyō (大名). As well as firefighting, these samurai enforced strict fire control rules on the local populations, such as maintaining night fire watches, forbidding the lighting of candles in upper-floor rooms, and imprisoning the owners of houses where fires had started.

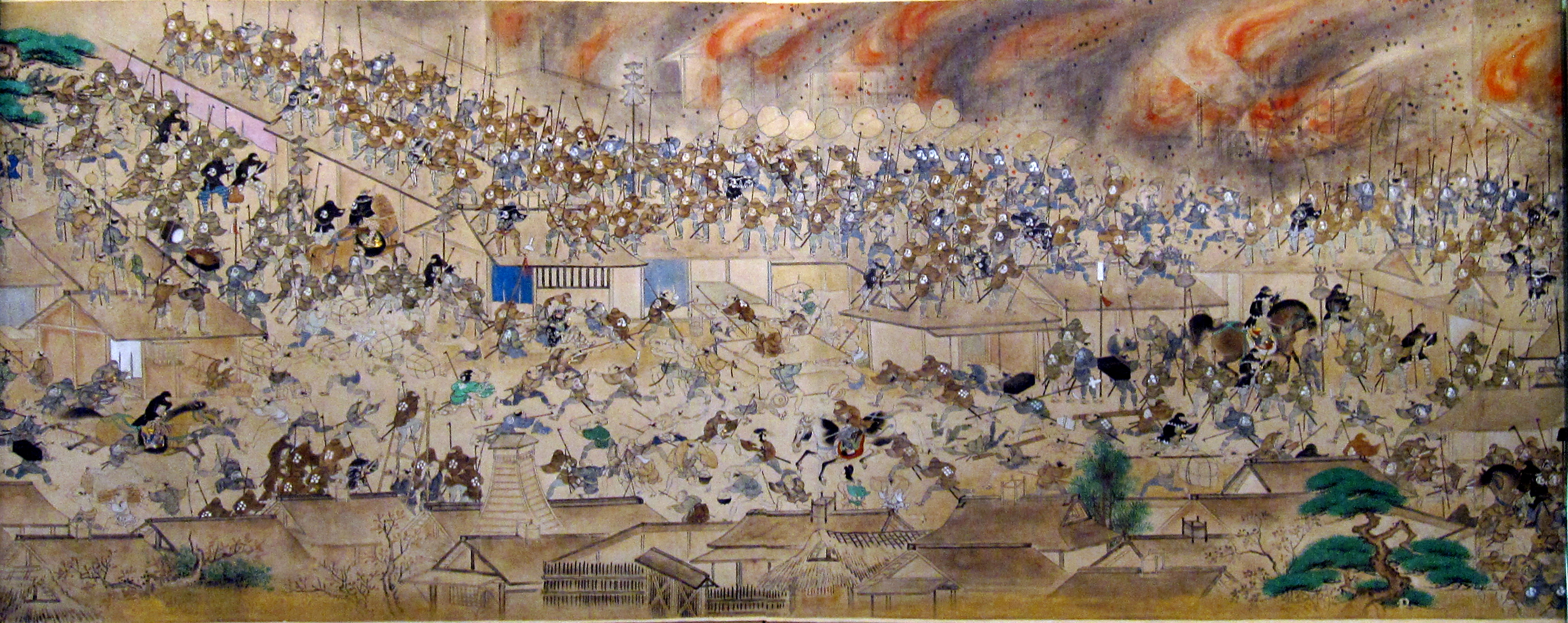
The Great Fire of Meireki depicted in a handscroll held by the Edo-Tokyo Museum.

In 1657, the Great Fire of Meireki ripped through the de facto capital of Edo (the site of modern-day Tokyo), destroying 60-70% of the city and killing over 100,000 people, with the local daimyō bikeshi brigades too undermanned, underequipped, and inexperienced to deal with such a large fire. This failure of fire control represented a severe threat to the authority of the ruling military shogunate, and so one year later the jō bikeshi (定火消) was established as a full-time brigade made up of hatamoto samurai directly under the command of the shogun. This brigade was mainly concerned with the protection of the shogun's properties, such as Edo Castle, however did cooperate with the daimyō bikeshi to deal with fires in common areas, so as to not let them spread.

Alongside the samurai firefighters, local tana bikeshi (店火消) brigades began to form, composed of local commoner businessmen who wished to protect their properties. In 1720, the Kyōhō Reforms reorganised this system, forming machi bikeshi (町火消), composed of commoners appointed by the town official. Over time, these brigades began to grow and were recognised as a competent firefighting force, even assisting the samurai brigades in extinguishing the Edo Castle Fire in 1747.

=== Meiji, Taishō, and pre-war Shōwa periods ===
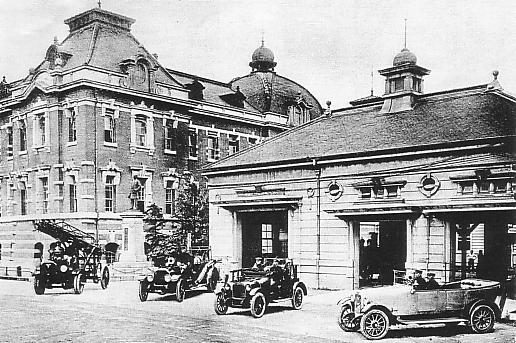
A building of the Tokyo Metropolitan Police Department's Fire Bureau.

By the time the Meiji era emerged, most firefighting across Japan was undertaken by machi bikeshi, and the number of samurai firefighters had dropped significantly. As a result of reforms in the 1880s following the Meiji restoration, career fire brigades across the country were absorbed into local police departments, where they became known as tokusetsu shōbō sho (特設消防署), whereas volunteer firefighters were reorganised into groups known as shōbō gumi (消防組) under the control of the governor of the prefecture. However, there was little change; fire services remained poorly trained and equipped, and Japanese cities remained largely vulnerable to regular major fires.

Throughout the Taishō and early Shōwa eras, this system remained largely unchanged until 1939 when the government, anticipating the Pacific War, reorganised the shōbō gumi into the new keibō dan (警防団) civil defense organizations, and the number of cities with career tokusetsu shōbō sho was increased.

=== Post-war Shōwa period ===
Following the defeat of Japan in the Pacific War, the Supreme Commander for the Allied Powers wished to democratise the fire service, which throughout the war had been linked with militarised police and civil defense units. This began in 1947, when the Volunteer Fire Corps Ordinance (Imperial Ordinance No. 185) was enacted, reorganising the keibō dan into the modern volunteer fire corps; the same year, the Fire Service Organization Act (later to be renamed the Fire and Disaster Management Organization Act) was passed by the National Diet, and came into effect the following year, leading to the creation of the National Fire Defense Agency (Japanese: 国家消防庁, Hepburn: Kokka Shōbōchō), the precursor to the modern FDMA, and the modern municipal fire department system.

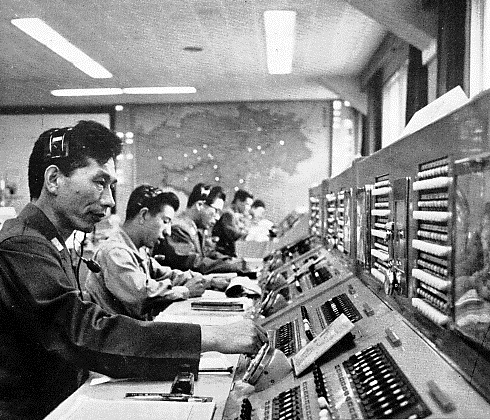
The new control room of the Tokyo Fire Department in the 1960s.

The following year, the Fire Service Act was passed and enacted, making fire prevention a duty of the new departments as well as their existing fire suppression duties. In the early years, the priorities of the new agencies was to form a "preventative and scientific" fire service, focusing on the prevention of fires and the integration of fire science into the core of the system, through the National Fire Institute (Japanese: 消防研究所, Hepburn: Shōbō kenkyūjo), a division of the NFDA. However, a series of major urban conflagrations in this period also highlighted the need for an expansion in firefighting capacity, which lead to the establishment of national standards, subsidies to local municipalities, and the reorganisation of the NFDA into the modern FDMA in 1960, under the new Ministry of Home Affairs, separating it organisationally from the police-led National Public Safety Commission it was previously under.

In 1961, the National Diet passed the Basic Act on Disaster Management, establishing a duty for the fire department to prepare for major disasters such as earthquakes and tsunami.

Emergency medical services were not initially the responsibility of the fire department, but as time went on fire departments became the primary provider of EMS, and so a 1962/1963 amendment to the Fire Service Act established the duty of fire departments to provide an ambulance service.

Another revision of the Fire and Disaster Management Organization Act in 1971 allowed for the establishment of wide-area fire departments covering multiple municipalities.

As Japan entered the early 1970s, the country was rocked by a series of major urban fires, such as the 1972 Sennichi Department Store Building fire and the 1973 Taiyo Department Store fire; in both of these fires investigations revealed that fire safety equipment failed or was not functional at the time, and that the buildings would not have been certified safe if built under new fire safety law. As a result, 1974 saw major additions to the Fire Service Law, including a new inspection system, and for the first time the regulations were made retroactive, forcing old buildings to be brought up to code. This led to a major reduction in fire deaths for a period of time following the fire, leading this revision to be considered a major milestone in Japan's fire safety history.

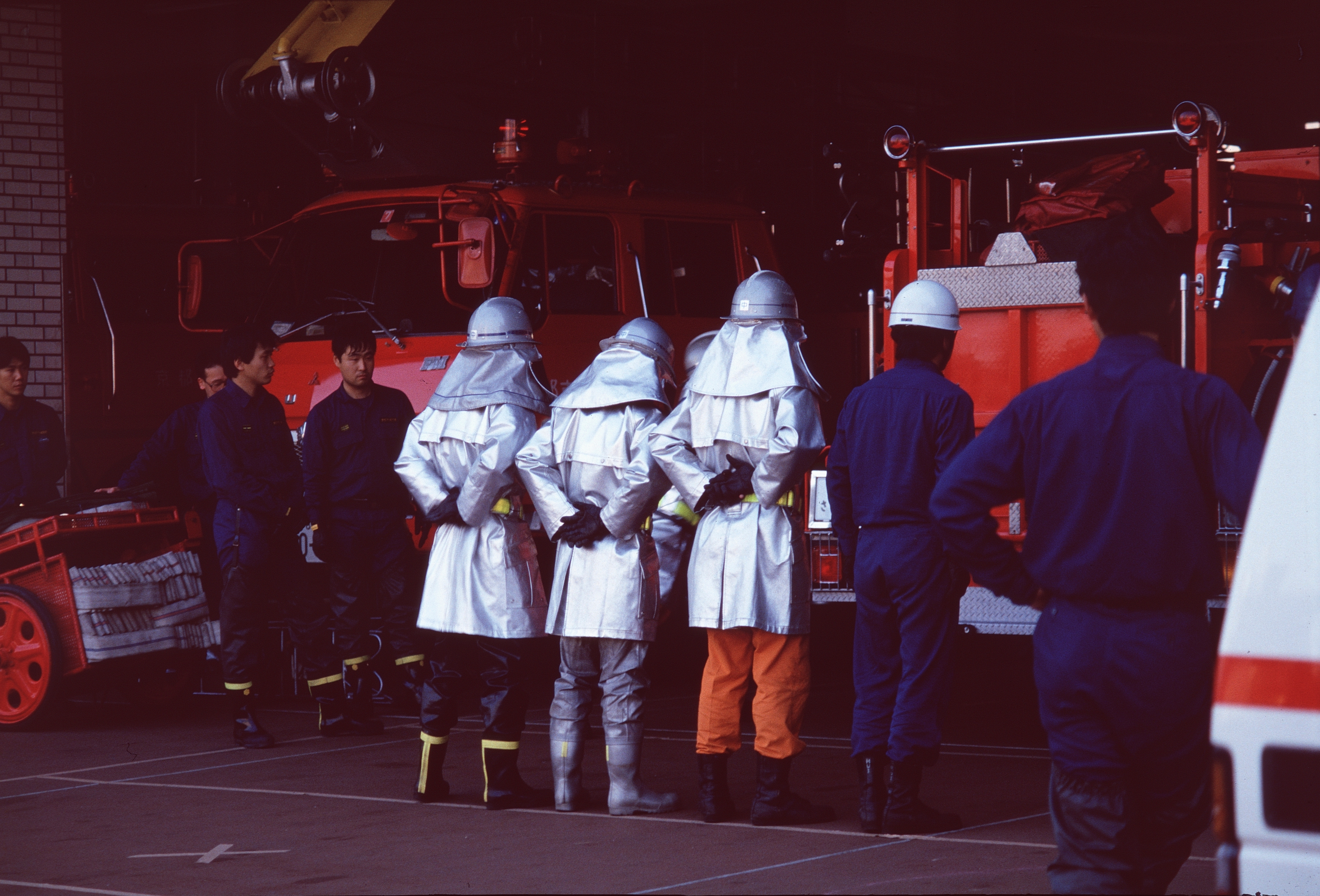
Japanese firefighters in turnout gear lining up for roll-call in 1985; this period saw improvements in the personal protective equipment afforded to firefighters, with heat-reflecting foil fire coats replacing older leather models.

However, the 1980s also saw major fire disasters, such as major hotel fires in Tochigi in 1980 and Tokyo in 1982, a gas explosion in an underground mall in Shizuoka in 1980, a nursing home fire in Tokyo in 1987, and a supermarket fire in Amagasaki in 1990. These fires highlighted new holes in fire safety law related to gas explosions and underground structures, and highlighted that many organisations were flouting the new laws introduced in 1974; this led to more legislative change, including the introduction of the Fire Safety Certification Mark (Japanese: 適マーク, Hepburn: Teki māku), making it clear to the public for the first time whether a building was up to code or not. This period also saw a steady decrease in the number of hazardous materials incidents as a result of the strengthening of the laws surrounding control of chemicals in the 60s and 70s.

The late 80s and early 90s also saw major changes to the way that firefighters engage in rescue operations; in 1985, the Nevado del Ruiz volcano erupted in Colombia, destroying the town of Armero and surrounding areas, killing over 23,000 people. The FDMA wished to send a rescue team to help, but there was no system for selecting and preparing rescue workers from Japan's hundreds of fire departments, all with their own rescue units; the following year, the FDMA established the International Rescue Team of the Japan Fire Service (IRT-JF) (Japanese: 国際消防救助隊, Hepburn: Kokusai shōbō kyūjotai), drawing rescuers from across the country and establishing a structure for them to be deployed abroad to large-scale disasters; the same year they were dispatched to the Lake Nyos disaster and the San Salvador eathquake, and in 1987 the Act Concerning the Dispatch of the Japan Disaster Relief Team was passed, putting in place the statutory authority for the team to deploy.

=== Heisei and Reiwa periods ===
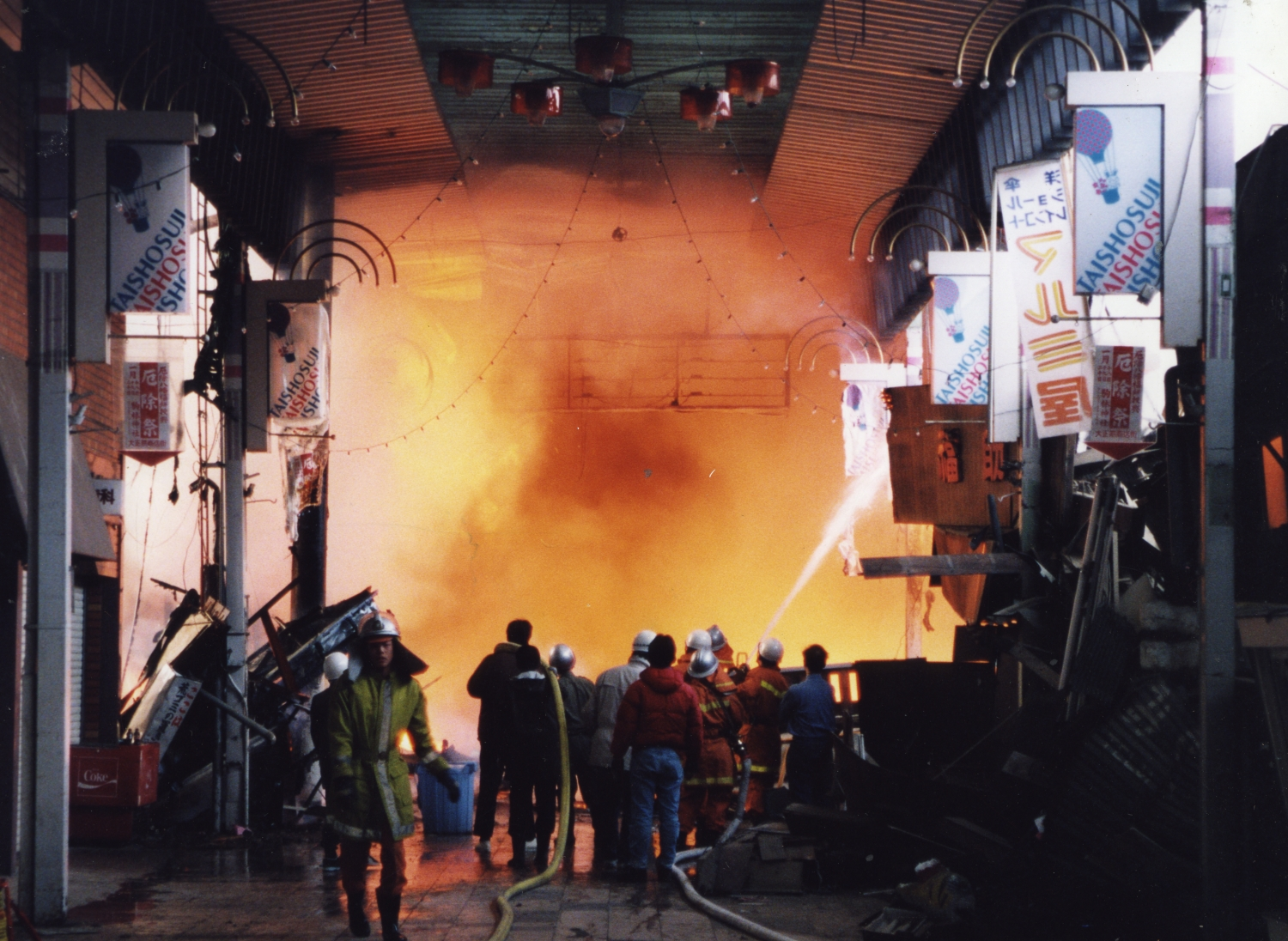
A fire at the Taisho-Suji Market in Kobe during the 1996 earthquake; with water mains ruptured, fires in large parts of the city remained largely unfought.

However, even larger change occurred following the 1995 Great Hanshin-Awaji earthquake (better known in the western world as the Kobe earthquake); the Kobe City Fire Bureau was overwhelmed by the disaster, and communications became intermittent due to damage to telecommunications equipment. In response, the FDMA formed domestic versions of the IRT-JF, known as Emergency Fire Response Teams (EFRTs) (Japanese: 緊急消防援助隊, Hepburn: Kinkyū shōbō enjo-tai), established resilient communications at national, prefectural, and municipal levels, and established a helicopter satellite communication system which allows images to be broadcast to control centres across Japan even if local telecommunications infrastructure is destroyed. These reforms also highlighted the role of the community and local fire prevention organisations, and also lead to a major review of firefighting during earthquakes, in view of the serious damage caused by the conflagrations that devastated Kobe following the quake.

As the new millennium dawned, the Japanese government became increasingly concerned with civil protection; the 1995 Tokyo subway sarin attack had highlighted the vulnerability of Japan's emergency management systems to acts of terrorism, a lesson shortly after reinforced by the September 11th attacks which shocked the world; in addition, the local security situation in East Asia was deteriorating following the emergence of China as a global superpower and the establishment of the North Korean nuclear programme. In response, the National Diet passed the 2005 Act concerning Measures for the Protection of People in Armed Attack Situations, etc. (better known as the Civil Protection Act), requiring the FDMA and fire departments to engage in preparation and response to armed attacks and terrorism.

== Organisations ==
=== Fire and Disaster Management Agency ===
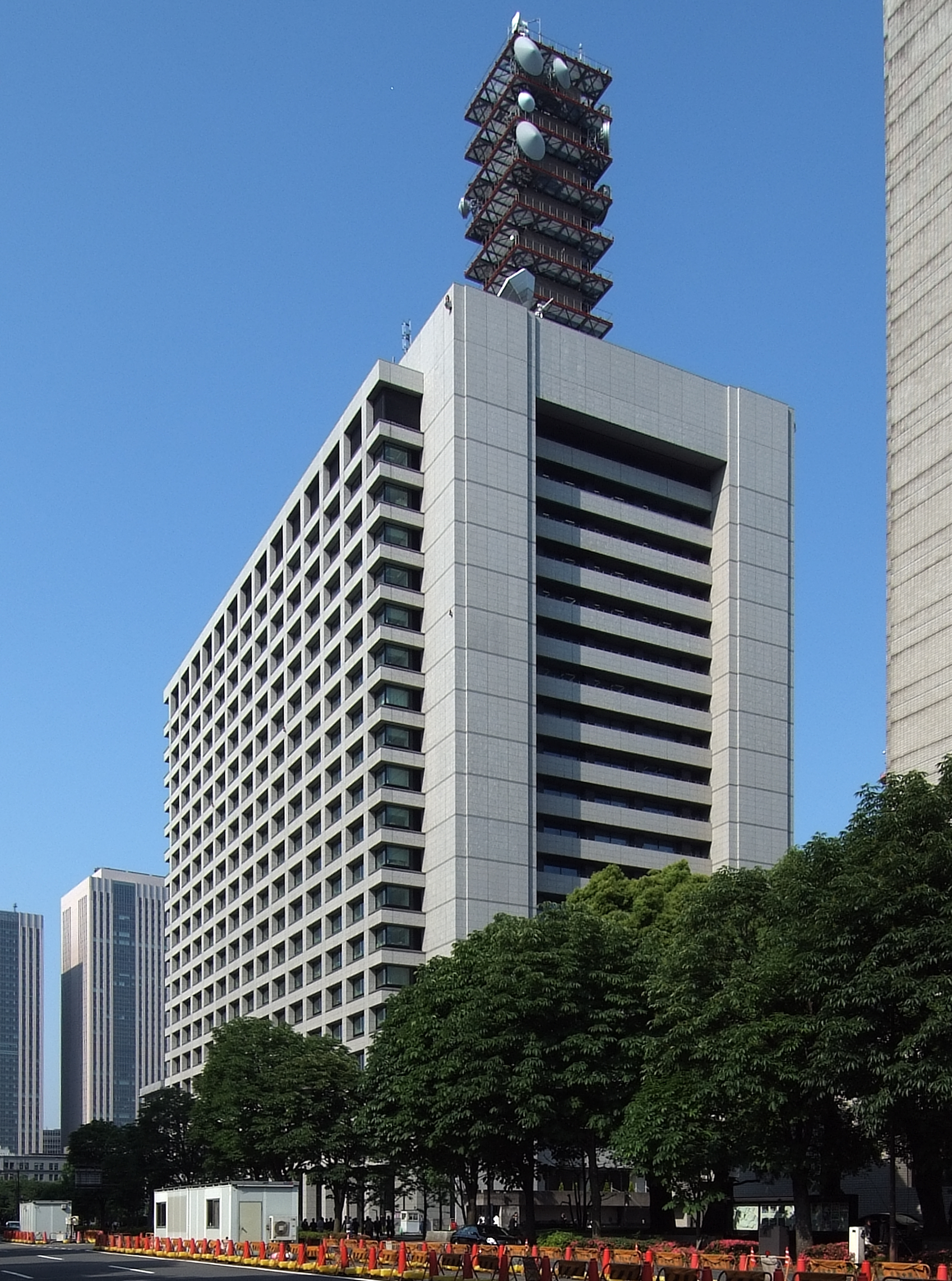
Government Building No. 2 in Minato, Tokyo; home to the agencies and bureaus of the MIC, including the FDMA.

The Fire and Disaster Management Agency (Japanese: 消防庁, Hepburn: Shōbōchō) is an external agency attached to the Ministry of Internal Affairs and Communication. Formed in 1947 as the National Fire Defense Agency, the FDMA has six key missions:

1. Prepare for large-scale disasters.
2. Save life from fire and disasters.
3. Prevent fires and disasters.
4. Enhance community disaster management.
5. Protect people from terrorism and armed attacks.
6. Develop new technologies and human resources.

The day-to-day responsibility of the FDMA is to develop national policy related to firefighting in service of the six missions; for example, the agency regularly produces notices to fire services across the country, both to improve the regular workings of the fire services and to respond to topical concerns in the field of firefighting. During major emergencies, the FDMA acts as a national coordinating body, setting up a command centre and collating information, as well as managing the deployment of national Emergency Fire Response Teams.

The FDMA also has two child institutions, the National Research Institute of Fire and Disaster (Japanese: 消防研究センター, Hepburn: Shōbō kenkyū sentā), which is responsible for the promotion of fire science, disaster risk reduction, and fire protection engineering, and the Fire and Disaster Management College (Japanese: 消防大学校, Hepburn: Shōbō daigaku-kō), which runs national training courses for senior or highly specialized firefighters, as well as providing advice, skills, and instructors to prefectural fire academies.

=== Municipal Fire Departments ===
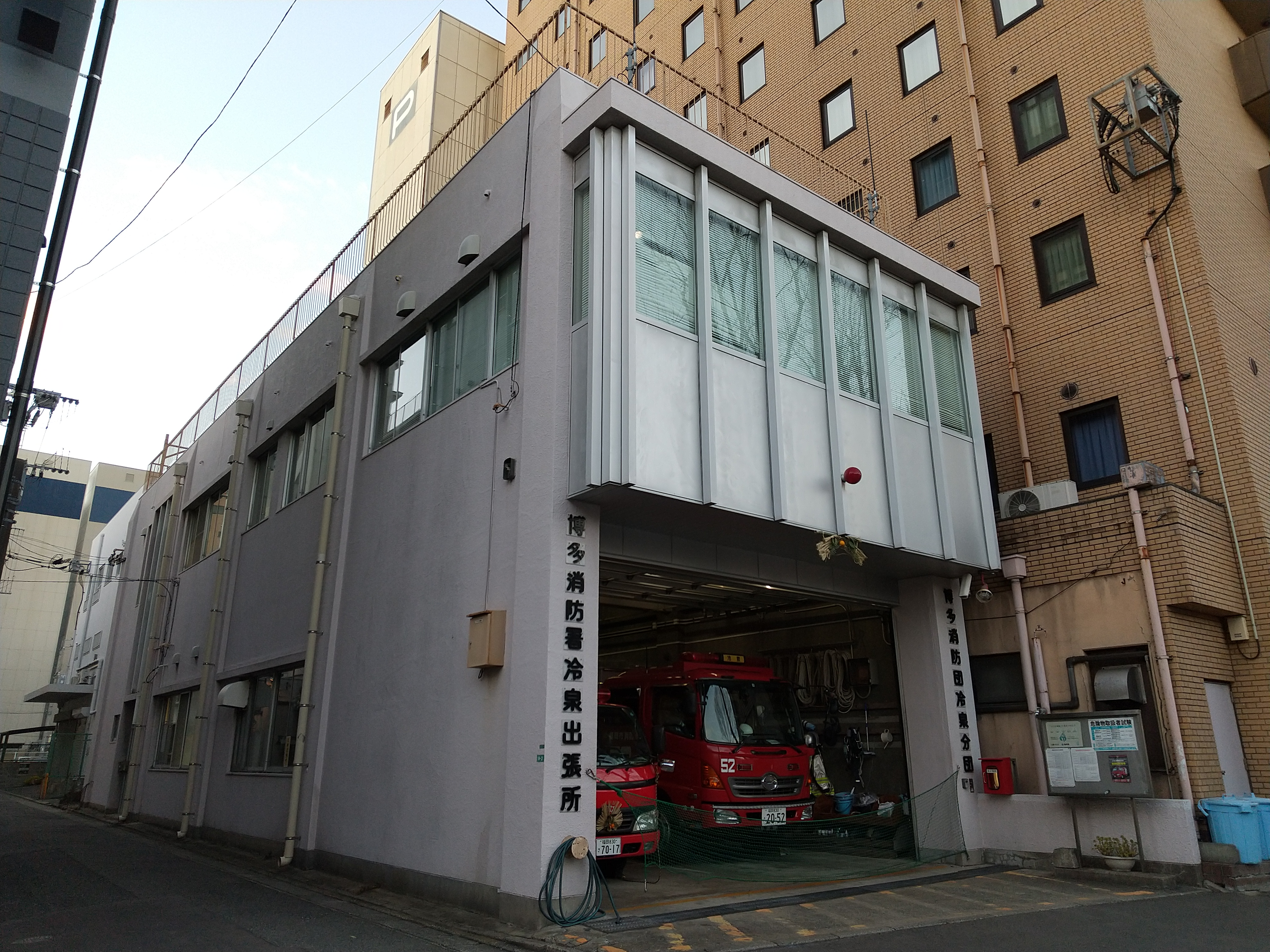
The Reisen branch of the Hakata Fire Station in Fukuoka; branch stations like these are simple emergency response buildings, whereas the larger Fire Station is a district centre for all services.

In Japan, responsibility for day-to-day firefighting is the responsibility of municipal fire departments (Japanese: 消防局, Hepburn: Shōbō-kyoku), sometimes also translated as fire headquarters and fire service institutions; as of 2022 there were 723 fire departments across the country, employing a total of 168,000 professional firefighters. These departments are answerable to the local municipal government or, in the case of the Tokyo Fire Department, the Metropolitan Government.

Fire departments in Japan can be divided into stations; in Japan, a fire station (Japanese: 消 防 署, Hepburn: Shōbō-sho) is a self-contained command structure providing services to a defined area, normally contiguous with a ward or municipal subdivision, as opposed to Anglo-American departments where a station is simply a building which is the base for emergency response vehicles and crew. Each fire station will be based at a large central building (the main fire station) which provides various services on top of emergency response, such as prevention work, fire investigation, liaison with local organisations and businesses etc. as well as several branch offices (Japanese: 出張所, Hepburn: Shutchōjo) which are simple emergency response stations in the Western sense.

These fire stations are assisted in providing frontline and public-facing services by the fire department headquarters (Japanese: 消防本部, Hepburn: Shōbō honbu) which is responsible for the development of policy and procedure via its divisions and sections. In some larger fire departments, the headquarters may host highly specialised frontline units, such as aviation corps. Some typical divisions and sections of fire department headquarters include:

- General Affairs Division (Japanese: 総務部, Hepburn: Sōmu-bu): Responsible for general administration, sections can include: General Affairs, Human Resources, Facilities, Education/Training, and Finance.
- Fire Defence Division (Japanese: 警防部, Hepburn: Keibō-bu): Responsible for frontline lifesaving work, sections can include: Firefighting, Emergency Medical Services, Rescue, and Mobile Command.
- Prevention Division (Japanese: 予防部, Hepburn: Yobō-bu): Responsible for fire safety and prevention, sections can include: Fire Safety Inspections, Public Awareness, Fire Investigations, and Legislation Guidance.
- Information Command Division (Japanese: 情報指揮部, Hepburn: Jōhō shiki-bu): Responsible for both emergency and routine communications, sections can include: 119 Emergency Call Centres, Public Relations, and General Communications.

=== Volunteer Fire Corps ===
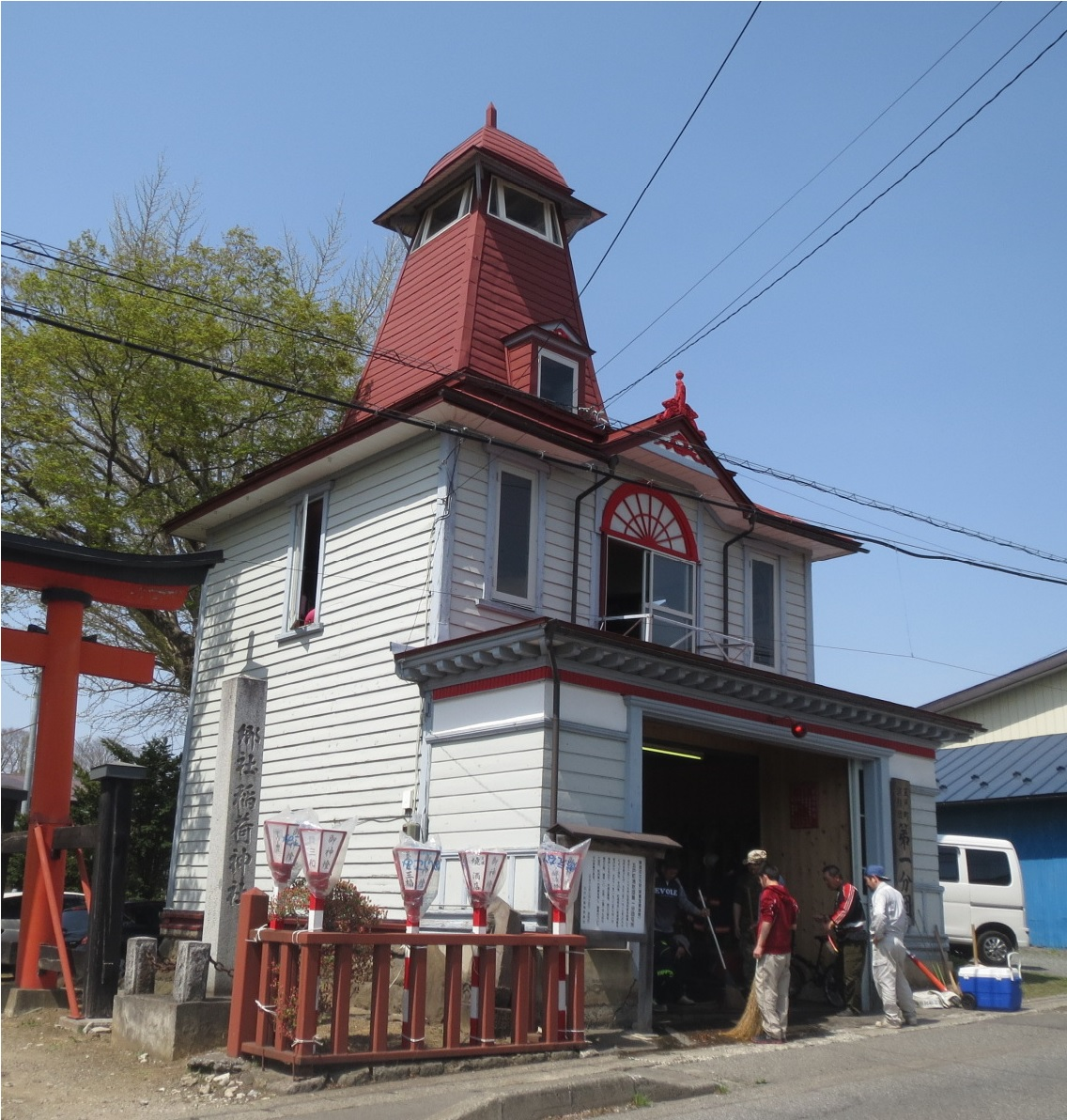
A station of the Gonohe Volunteer Fire Corps; older buildings such as these may still have fire watch towers built in.

Every municipality in Japan, as well as being able to establish a full-time municipal fire department, must establish a Volunteer Fire Corps (Japanese: 消防団, Hepburn: Shōbō-dan), sometimes also translated as a fire brigade; as of 2022 there were 2,196 fire corps across the country (some municipalities have established more than one corps), with a total of 784,000 volunteer firefighters between them. Like their professional counterparts, these corps are also accountable to the local municipal government, with the chief of the local municipal fire department (if one exists) also exercising authority over the volunteer corps during deployments.

Despite being described as volunteer, members of the fire corps are considered public servants (although a special category) and do receive some remuneration for their work. Volunteer firefighters all have day jobs, but may be called away from their work to assist with emergencies, especially in areas without a full-time fire department, and so the municipal government provides remuneration for the potential loss of income this incurs, as well as a stipend for their time training and doing community work; this can be thought of as similar to the retained duty system employed by fire brigades in the United Kingdom.

Volunteer firefighters in Japan generally do little hands-on fire and rescue work in day-to-day life, as over 99% of the country is covered by one of the full-time municipal fire departments; instead, regular work for the corps mainly consists of training, community disaster awareness and first aid education, fire safety visits to vulnerable people, and public relations campaigns. The main purpose of the volunteer fire corps in terms of emergency response, therefore, is to assist the full-time emergency services when a major disaster strikes, such as an earthquake, tsunami, or tropical storm.

=== Prefectural governments ===
The prefectures of Japan play a relatively minor role in firefighting, with most responsibilities being carried out at the municipal level; however, the prefectures are responsible for three major aspects of firefighting: the development of the prefectural disaster plan, the establishment of prefectural fire academies, and the operation of prefectural fire aviation units.

=== Japan Self-Defense Forces ===
Each service branch of the Japan Self-Defense Forces maintains fire and ambulance cover for their installations, and can assist the civil authorities during major emergencies.

== Staffing ==
=== Professional firefighters ===
Employees of municipal fire departments in Japan are known as shōbō shokuin (消防職員), whereas the term shōbō riin (消防吏員) specifically refers to those employed in frontline firefighting, rescue, and ambulance companies, intentionally excluding fire department staff who work in primarily administrative or office-based roles. Regardless, all employees are considered local civil servants, and their rank structure maps on to the standards and pay scales associated with other municipal government staff. Recruitment into the fire department, therefore, largely follows the same process as for all other municipal government officials, in the form of highly competitive examinations followed by training for successful applicants (in this case, at prefectural fire academies); municipal government careers such as firefighting are considered high-status jobs in Japan, and as a result are very competitive.

One unique issue faced by Japanese firefighters, particularly younger ones, is a lack of experience with live fire as a result of fire safety improvements and the subsequent reduction in fire emergencies. In response, companies have been set up to conduct live fire training for firefighters wishing to improve their skills.

==== Women in fire departments ====
Japan has a relatively small proportion of female firefighters by international standards (3.7% of career firefighters and 3.8% of volunteer firefighters in 2024) and they face extra challenges and restrictions that male firefighters do not.

In 2015, 288 of the nation's fire departments (roughly 40%) did not employ any female firefighters; when questioned, 19 of those departments reported that they had a policy of barring women from employment within the department at all (in contravention of national policy), whereas 59 said they had no female applicants, and 165 said they had received applications from women, but had not accepted any of them.

Legal restrictions on the employment of women in workplaces involving heavy lifting and exposure to toxic gases have widely been used by fire departments to bar women from serving on frontline pump, ladder, and rescue squads, despite advice from the Fire and Disaster Management Agency that these restrictions are largely mitigated by teamwork and the use of SCBA. As a result, in 2015, only 6% of career female firefighters surveyed worked in frontline firefighting companies, with a further 25% serving in EMS roles, and 2.4% in mobile command roles, with the remainder working across office-based roles such as prevention, call-handling, and general administration.

The FDMA and Japanese government are looking to increase the proportion of female firefighters via reforms, mainly consisting of the development of alternative workstyles, improving maternity provisions, and upgrading equipment and facilities to accommodate female firefighters.

==== Municipal fire department ranks and insignia ====
The rank structure and insignia of the career municipal fire departments of Japan are dictated in regulations published by the Fire and Disaster Management Agency, the nation's coordinating body for fire and rescue services. In formal and station wear, rank is indicated by a small rectangular badge, normally worn on the left breast, consisting of varying numbers of lines and stars (the star used on the badge is the Firefighter's Emblem of Japan), whereas in operational wear rank is normally indicated by bands on the headwear of varying number and thickness according to rank.

Rank	Roles in a department serving the special wards (Tokyo Fire Department)	Roles in a department serving a designated city or over 700,000 residents	Roles in a department serving 300,000 to 700,000 residents	Roles in a department serving 100,000 to 300,000 residents	Roles in a department serving less than 100,000 residents	Badge Insignia	Helmet Markings
Fire Chief (aka Fire Superintendent-General) Japanese: 消防総監 Hepburn: Shōbō sōkan	Chief of the Department						
Deputy Chief (aka Fire Chief Superintendent) Japanese: 消防司監 Hepburn: Shōbō shikan	Vice-Chief of the Department, HQ Chief of Division	Chief of the Department					
First Assistant Chief (aka Fire Senior Superintendent) Japanese:消防正監 Hepburn: Shōbō seikan	HQ Chief of Division, District Chief	Vice-Chief of the Department, HQ Chief of Division, Station Chief	Chief of the Department				
Assistant Chief (aka Fire Superintendent) Japanese:消防監 Hepburn: Shōbō kan	Counsellor of the Department, HQ Chief of Section, Station Chief	HQ Chief of Section, Station Vice-Chief	Vice-Chief of the Department, HQ Chief of Division, Station Chief	Chief of the Department			
Battalion Chief (aka Fire Senior Commander) Japanese:消防司令長 Hepburn: Shōbō shirei-chō	HQ/Station Chief of Section, Vice-Counsellor of the Department, Station Vice-Chief	HQ/Station Chief of Section, Battalion Commander	HQ Chief of Section, Station Vice-Chief, Battalion Commander	Vice-Chief of the Department, HQ/Station Chief of Section, Station Chief	Chief of the Department		
Fire Captain (aka Fire Commander) Japanese: 消防司令 Hepburn: Shōbō shirei	HQ/Station Assistant Chief of Section, HQ/Station Chief of Subsection, Battalion Commander	HQ Assistant Chief of Section, HQ/Station Chief of Subsection, Company Commander	HQ/Station Assistant Chief of Section, HQ Chief of Subsection, Company Commander, Platoon Commander	HQ/Station Assistant Chief of Section	Vice-Chief of the Department, HQ Chief of Section, HQ Assistant Chief of Section, Station Chief, Station-Vice Chief, Battalion Commander		
Fire Lieutenant (aka Fire Assistant Commander) Japanese: 消防司令補 Hepburn: Shōbō shirei-ho	HQ/Station Senior Staff, Company Commander, Platoon Commander	HQ Senior Staff, HQ Chief Examiner, Station Chief of Subsection, Platoon Commander	HQ/Station Chief Examiner, Station Chief of Subsection	HQ/Station Chief of Subsection, Company Commander	HQ/Station Chief of Subsection, Company Commander, Platoon Commander		
Fire Sergeant (aka Firefighter Chief) Japanese: 消防士長 H Hepburn: Shōbō shichō	HQ Assistant Senior Staff, Station Team Leader, Station Team Member	HQ Assistant Senior Staff, Station Team Leader, Station Team Member	HQ/Station Senior Staff, Station Team Leader, Station Team Member	HQ/Station Chief Examiner, Platoon Commander	HQ/Station Chief of Subsection, HQ/Station Chief Examiner, Platoon Commander		
Assistant Fire Sergeant (aka Assistant Firefighter Chief) Japanese: 消防副士長 Hepburn: Shōbō fuku-shichō	HQ Team Member, Station Team Leader, Station Team Member	HQ Team Member, Station Team Leader, Station Team Member	HQ Assistant Senior Staff, Station Team Leader, Station Team Member	HQ/Station Assistant Chief Examiner	HQ/Station Senior Staff		
Firefighter Japanese: 消防士 Hepburn: Shōbō shi	HQ Team Member, Station Team Leader, Station Team Member	HQ Team Member, Station Team Leader, Station Team Member	HQ Team Member, Station Team Leader, Station Team Member	HQ Team Member, Station Team Leader, Station Team Member	HQ Team Member, Station Team Leader, Station Team Member		

=== Volunteer firefighters ===
Members of volunteer fire corps in Japan are classified as a special class of local civil servant, allowing them to exercise certain powers under the authority of the municipal government.

==== Volunteer fire corps ranks and insignia ====
The rank structure and insignia of the reserve volunteer fire corps of Japan are also dictated by the Fire and Disaster Management Agency. As with the career departments, in formal and station wear, rank is indicated by a small rectangular badge, normally worn on the left breast, consisting of varying numbers of lines and stars (the star used on the badge in this case is the Volunteer Fire Corps Emblem of Japan), whereas in operational wear rank is normally indicated by bands on the headwear of varying number and thickness according to rank.

Rank	Volunteer Firefighter Japanese: 団員 Hepburn: Dan'in	Volunteer Crew Chief Japanese: 班長 Hepburn: Hanchō	Volunteer Company Chief Japanese: 部長 Hepburn: Buchō	Volunteer Assistant Squad Chief Japanese: 副分団長 Hepburn: Fuku-bun danchō	Volunteer Squad Chief Japanese: 分団長 Hepburn: Bun danchō	Volunteer Assistant Fire Chief Japanese: 副団長 Hepburn: Fuku danchō	Volunteer Fire Chief Japanese: 団長 Hepburn: Danchō
Badge Insignia							
Helmet Markings							

== Vehicles and equipment ==
Japanese fire departments generally have many types of vehicles which are highly specialized to a specific role (as opposed to other departments worldwide where the majority of fire engines fulfil multiple roles) which some have linked to Japan's wider cultural traditions of specialization and refinement. All vehicles employed by the fire department or volunteer fire corps are collectively known as fire engines (Japanese: 消防車, Hepburn: Shōbō-sha), with those designed for pumping water known being known as ponpu (ポンプ); all fire engines are classified as special-purpose vehicles under orders issued pursuant to the Road Traffic Act, setting down minimum standards for their design and granting them certain privileges over other road users.

Standard types of fire engine
Type of Vehicle		Function	Minimum Crew	Example Image
Portable Fire Pump Vehicle Japanese: 可搬消防ポンプ積載車 Hepburn: Kahan shōbō ponpu sekisai-sha		An emergency vehicle carrying a portable fire pump and waterways equipment, often employed by Volunteer Fire Corps; these vehicles tend to be small and manoeuvrable to navigate rural roads.	Require a minimum of 4 firefighters	
Fire Pump Car Japanese: 消防ポンプ自動車 Hepburn: Shōbō ponpu jidōsha		A traditional fire engine with an inbuilt pump run on the vehicle's engine, as well as carrying waterways equipment and other ancillary equipment such as breaking in tools, SCBA equipment, and first aid supplies; these vehicles may come with or without an inbuilt water tank. Unlike most western fire engines, these vehicles rarely carry hydraulic rescue equipment, as this is a task reserved for the specialised rescue teams.	Require a minimum of 5 firefighters including a Fire Sergeant/Volunteer Crew Chief or above (except vehicles specially adapted to work with less crew)	
Ladder Car Japanese: はしご自動車 Hepburn: Hashigo jidōsha		Designed with a large ladder for rescuing people from high places or providing a water tower for firefighting from above. There is significant variation between these trucks; some are built on top of pump trucks, whereas some are standalone ladders. Similarly, some have a basket at the top for rescue, whereas others are designed only for firefighting and only have a water cannon on the end of the ladder boom. The boom itself may also either be articulated or straight.	Require a minimum of 5 firefighters including a Fire Sergeant or above (except vehicles specially adapted to work with less crew)	
Chemical Fire Engine Japanese: 化学消防車 Hepburn: Kagaku shōbō-sha		These vehicles, found in communities with chemical or nuclear industry, carry foam and dry chemical extinguishing agents to put out fires involving hazardous materials. Again, there is variation within the class, as some vehicles can be small or large, be armoured against heat and HazMat, can incorporate water cannon ladders, or can act as normal fire pump cars when not required for HazMat emergencies.	Require a minimum of 5 firefighters including a Fire Sergeant or above (except vehicles specially adapted to work with less crew)	
Fireboat Japanese: 消防艇 Hepburn: Shōbō-tei		Fireboats are common across Japan due to the coastal nature of the majority of Japanese cities, although they are generally only found in departments serving those larger cities. They are responsible for fighting fires on watercraft and fires close to the water, such as those on docks or bridges, as well as rescuing people who get into difficulty in the water.	Department HQ to determine minimum crew requirement.	
Emergency Car (Ambulance) Japanese: 救急自動車 Hepburn: Kyūkyū jidōsha		Fire departments in Japan are responsible for providing emergency medical services, and so they run ambulances to respond to calls for medical assistance; ambulances are staffed by at least one Emergency Life Saving Technician (ELST), the Japanese equivalent of a paramedic (although their scope is noticeably narrower than their western counterparts).	Requires a minimum of 3 firefighters including at least 1 ELST and a Fire Sergeant or above (a member of crew can be substituted with hospital staff on transfer missions)	
Rescue Work Vehicle Japanese: 救助工作車 Hepburn: Kyūjo kōsaku-sha		These vehicles are specifically outfitted for technical rescue, carrying equipment such as hydraulic rescue tools, engine cutters, search cameras, and breaking tools. Special or advanced rescue vehicles may also carry winches, cranes, HazMat suits and measuring equipment, rock drills, and Urban Search and Rescue equipment.	Require a minimum of 5 firefighters including a Fire Sergeant or above	
Command Vehicle Japanese: 指揮車 Hepburn: Shiki-sha		These vehicles provide a mobile base from which the Incident Commander can take charge of and plan the response to an emergency; they are generally staffed with firefighters trained in incident command and logistics as well as carrying a senior fire officer to fulfil the incident commander role. The vehicles themselves will be kitted out with advanced telecommunications equipment, maps and plans, methods for tracking resources on scene, and other logistical equipment.	Require a minimum of 3 firefighters (4 in areas deemed to be of high-risk) including a Fire Captain or above	
Specialised Vehicles Japanese: 特殊 Hepburn: Tokushu-sha	Public Information Vehicle Japanese: 広報車 Hepburn: Kōhō-sha	Employed by the public relations sections of departments, these vehicles transport photographers and information managers between job sites and to the scenes of emergencies, allowing them to collect information for communication with news agencies and the public and gather promotional material.	Department HQ to determine minimum crew requirement.	
Specialised Vehicles Japanese: 特殊 Hepburn: Tokushu-sha	Equipment Transport Vehicle Japanese: 資器材搬送車 Hepburn: Shi kizai hansō-sha	These vehicles, normally based on van or truck bodies, are responsible for transporting large amounts of ancillary equipment to the scenes of emergencies as required; they may be marked and equipped with emergency lights, or they may look simply like normal goods vehicles.	Department HQ to determine minimum crew requirement.	
Specialised Vehicles Japanese: 特殊 Hepburn: Tokushu-sha	Water Tanker Vehicle Japanese: 水槽車 Hepburn: Suisō-sha	These large vehicles are capable of carrying multiple tonnes of water to the scenes of emergencies, providing a supply of firefighting water in areas which lack a reliable hydrant system; additionally, many of these vehicles are also designed to be suitable for carrying drinking water, allowing them to provide humanitarian relief after major disasters.	Department HQ to determine minimum crew requirement.	
Specialised Vehicles Japanese: 特殊 Hepburn: Tokushu-sha	Smoke Exhaust/High Foam Vehicle Japanese: 排煙・高発泡車 Hepburn: Haien-kō・happō-sha	These vehicles are designed to respond to fires in underground and confined spaces; they are capable of extracting heavy amounts of smoke from confined areas with large suction fans, creating survivable conditions for people trapped inside, as well as being capable of flooding confined spaces with high-expanding firefighting foam, extinguishing any fires without having to commit firefighters into the dangerous area.	Department HQ to determine minimum crew requirement.	
Specialised Vehicles Japanese: 特殊 Hepburn: Tokushu-sha	Support Vehicle Japanese: 支援車 Hepburn: Shien-sha	These vehicles exist to provide rehabilitation areas for firefighters during protracted incidents; depending on the setup of the vehicle and the equipment provided, they can provide rest areas, hot or cold food and drink, toilets, and showers.	Department HQ to determine minimum crew requirement.	
Specialised Vehicles Japanese: 特殊 Hepburn: Tokushu-sha	Personnel Transport Vehicle Japanese: 人員輸送車 Hepburn: Jin'in yusō-sha	Normally based on a minivan chassis, these vehicles exist to transport large numbers of firefighting personnel to and from the scene of an emergency; in addition, they can also act as a rest area for firefighters on scene or be used to transport large numbers of walking wounded at mass-casualty incidents.	Department HQ to determine minimum crew requirement.	
Specialised Vehicles Japanese: 特殊 Hepburn: Tokushu-sha	Long-Distance Large-Volume Water Transport Vehicle Japanese: 遠距離大量送水車 Hepburn: Enkyori tairyō sōsui-sha	These vehicles, somewhat analogously to the High Volume Pumps used in British fire and rescue services, contain long stretches of wide-bore hose and a high-strength water pump, allowing water to be drawn from open bodies of water (such as rivers, lakes, or the sea) and pumped significant distances to where it is needed for firefighting. These vehicles were introduced following the Great Hanshin-Awaji Earthquake as a response to the lack of water which hindered firefighters in the aftermath.	Department HQ to determine minimum crew requirement.	

The FDMA regulations also require departments to hold a certain number of vehicles as emergency spare trucks for use when frontline vehicles are unavailable.

In addition to the vehicles laid out in the FDMA regulations, many fire departments across Japan, especially those in larger cities, maintain other types of specialist vehicles.

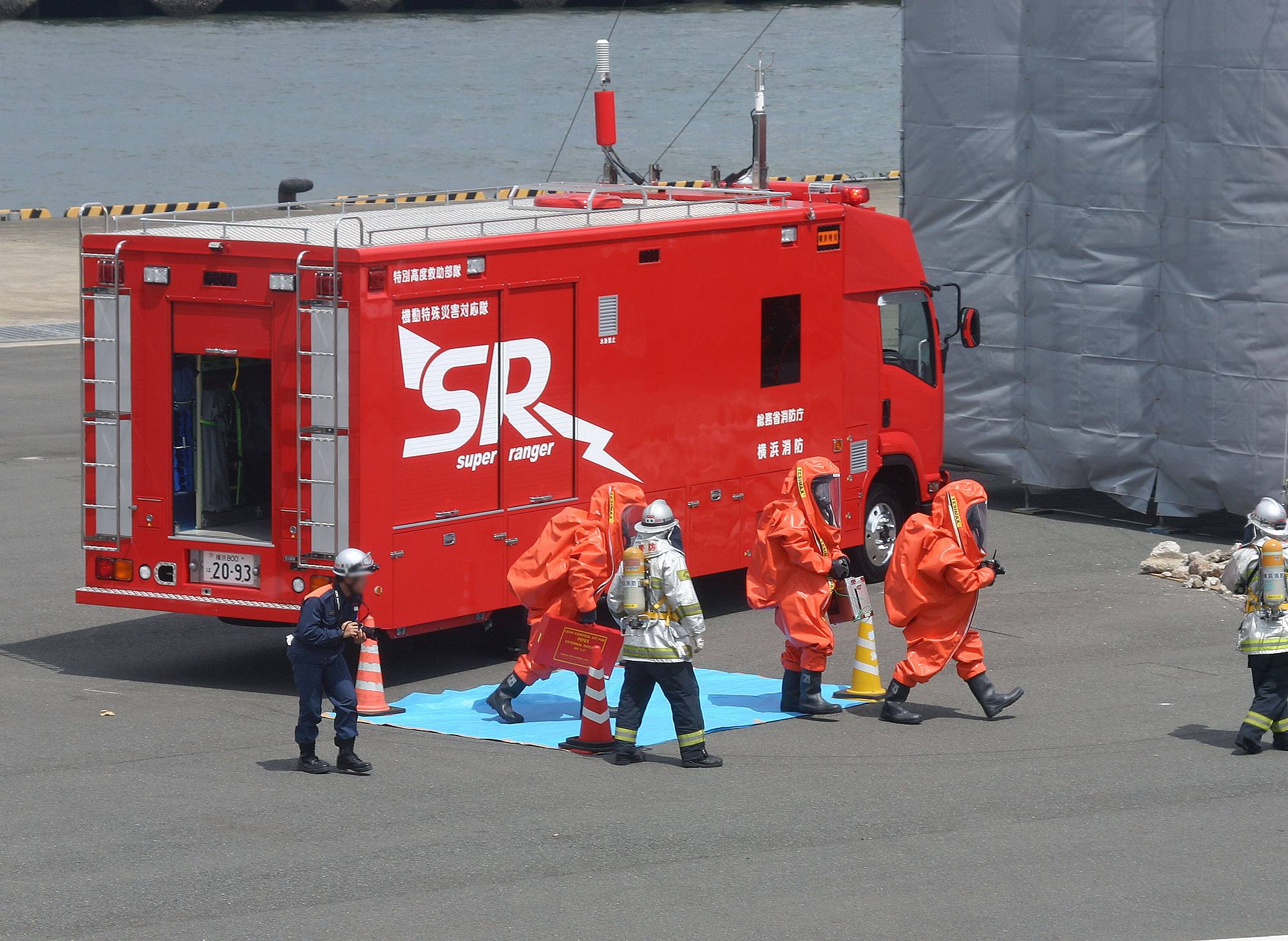
Special Disaster Response Vehicle (HazMat/CBRN)

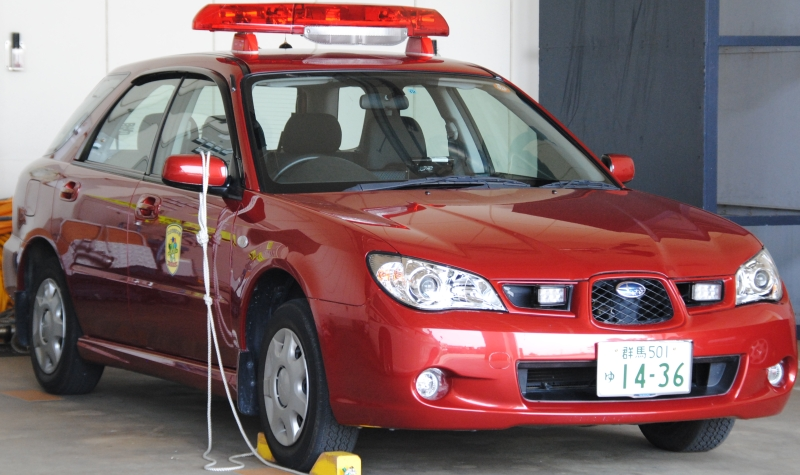
Chief's Command Car

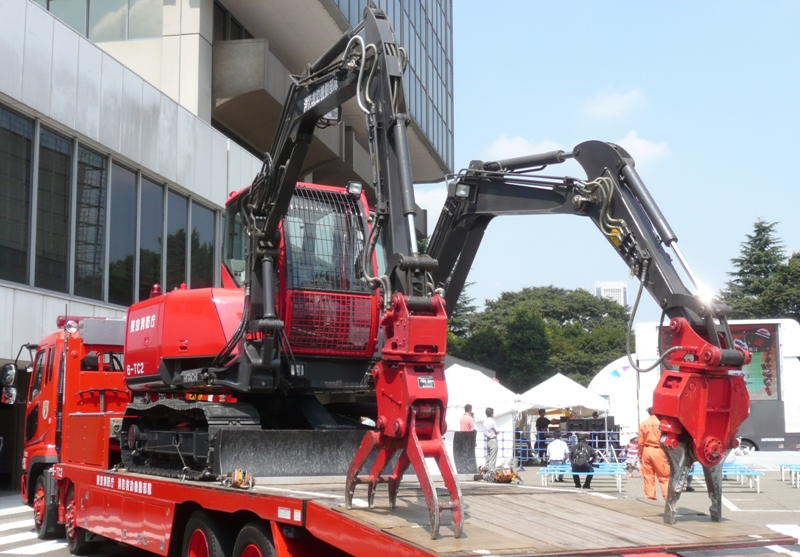
Heavy Machinery Transport Vehicles

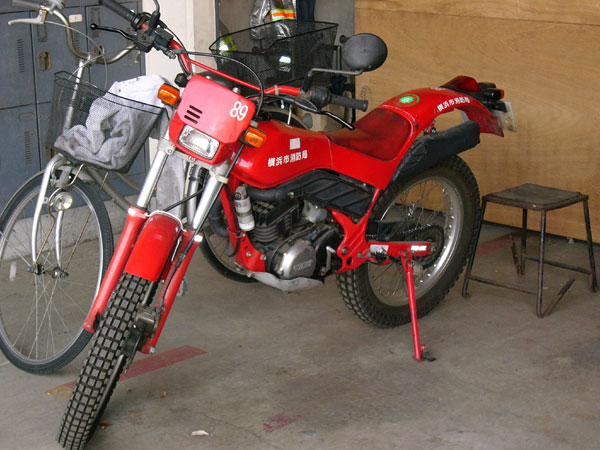
Fire motorcycle

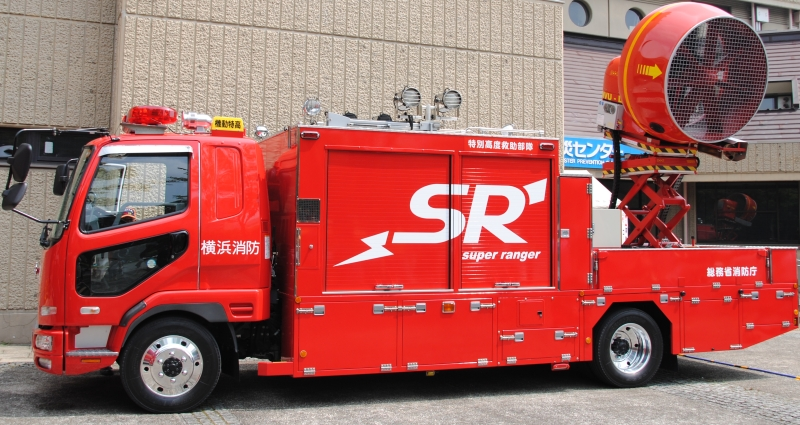
Special Advanced Work Vehicle (water jet cutter and large blower fan)

== Fire safety ==
Japan can be considered a reasonably safe country in terms of fire safety; in 2021, there were 0.5 deaths per 100,000 people as a result of fire and burns, which was slightly higher than comparable European nations such as France and Germany, but lower than North American nations such as Mexico and the USA. Since 2015, the rate of building fires has generally trended downwards, although the amount of loss caused by these fires has increased; on the other hand, the rate of wildfire in Japan has been steadily increasing since 2015, both in terms of the gross number of fires and in their average area burned.

In 2025, the leading causes of building fires in Japan were arson, smoking, and hot plates in kitchens.

== See also ==
- Law enforcement in Japan
- Health care system in Japan
- Emergency medical services in Japan
- List of comparative firefighting ranks
- Geography of firefighting
