= 2026 Ōtsuchi wildfires =

2026 fire in Iwate, Japan

- Part of Wildfires in 2026
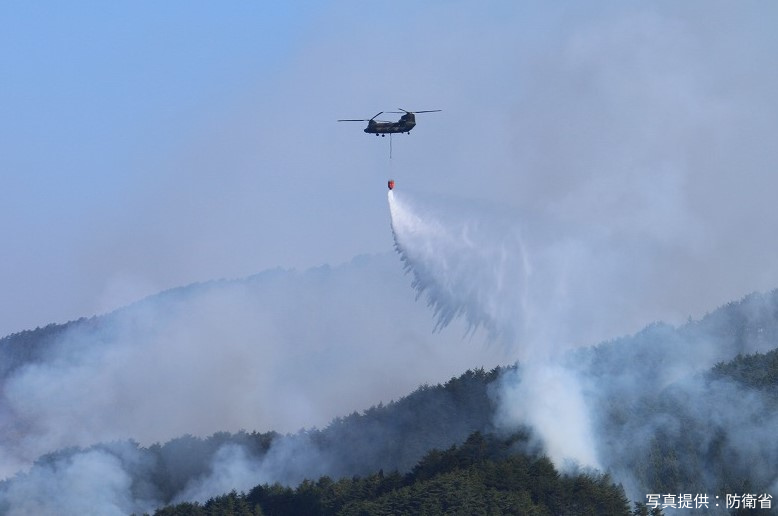
- A CH-47J dropping water at the fire
- Date: April 22, 2026 – May 29, 2026 (Note: The fire was declared to have been "under control" on May 2.) (38 days); (JST)
- Location: Ōtsuchi, Iwate, Japan
- Coordinates: 39.372°N 141.902°E

Statistics
- Burned area: 1,633 hectares (4,040 acres; 16.33 km^{2}; 6.31 sq mi) (total) (Note: Kirikiri District: 1,187 hectares (2,930 acres; 11.87 km^{2}; 4.58 sq mi); Kozuchi District: 446 hectares (1,100 acres; 4.46 km^{2}; 1.72 sq mi)) (Note: This excludes the separate fire that broke out on May 6 that burned 2 hectares (4.9 acres; 20,000 m^{2}; 220,000 sq ft).)

Impacts
- Injuries: 2
- Evacuated: 3,233
- Structures destroyed: 8

Ignition
- Cause: Under investigation

Map
- Location within Iwate Prefecture Location within Japan

On April 22, 2026, two wildfires broke out in Ōtsuchi, Iwate, Japan. It is the second-largest fire in Japan, behind the 2025 Ōfunato wildfire, in forty years since the Heisei era. It burned 1,633 hectares (4,040 acres) or about 8% of the town's area before being completely extinguished on May 29. The fire burned eight buildings, resulting in the injury of two people, and caused the evacuation of 3,233 people, about one-third of the town's population.

== Background ==
The Sanriku region is vulnerable to wildfires. Wildfires in Japan are relatively rare. Prior to the fire, there had only been two fires in Japan since the Heisei era that exceeded 1,000 hectares: the wildfire that broke out in Ōfunato, Iwate Prefecture, in February 2025, which was one of the largest fires in Japan and consumed 3,370 hectares (8,300 acres), and the Kushiro wildfire in 1992, which burned 1,030 hectares (2,500 acres). A strong wind warning was issued on April 22, 2026, in Ōtsuchi, Iwate.

== Progession ==
=== Main wildfires ===
At 13:53 JST (UTC+9) on April 22, 2026, a forest fire broke out in the Kozuchi district of Ōtsuchi, Iwate, in the mountains about 8 kilometres (5.0 mi) northwest of the town center. At 16:22, a second fire broke out near the Kirikiri Tunnel on National Route 45 in the Kirikiri District, 2 kilometres (1.2 mi) east of the town center. It spread westward due to strong winds during the night, and by 21:00, it had burned at least 95,000 square metres (23 acres) in total. By 06:00, the fire burned at least 200 hectares (490 acres) of the forest. At 18:00, the fire burned at least 431 hectares (1,070 acres). At 6:00 of April 24, the fire grew to 730 hectares (1,800 acres). At 18:00, the fire burned at least 1,176 hectares (2,910 acres), more than five times since the day before. At 06:00 on April 26, it expanded to approximately 1,373 hectares (3,390 acres) in total. It grew to 1,618 hectares (4,000 acres) by 06:00 on April 27.

A rain slowed down the growth of the fire and according to fire department, the fire was "generally under control". Despite the rain, the fire grew 15 hectares (37 acres) on April 28, totalling to 1,633 hectares (4,040 acres) or about 8% of the town's area. On April 30, the Iwate Prefectural Government confirmed that the growth of the fire had been stopped, but the fire was still not extinguished because the fire department still reported the presence of heat sources. At 13:00 on May 2, it was declared that the fire was "under control".

=== After May 2 ===
At 13:30 on May 6, a new forest fire broke out about 150 metres (490 ft) north of the Shiroyama Park Gymnasium near the town hall. According to the prefectural government, it was believed to have weakened the momentum of the fire due to the continued firefighting. It was extinguished on 9:00 on May 7. The fire burned an additional 2 hectares (4.9 acres). A white smoke was seen rising on May 14 in the Sawayama district of the town. The fire was quickly extinguished. According to the fire department, no new heat source nor smoke was detected a week leading up to May 22. At 13:00 on May 29, the fire had been declared as completely extinguished, stating that there is no risk of re-ignition.

== Response ==
On the evening of April 22, fire trucks from nearby towns were requested. On the morning of April 23, Iwate Prefecture's disaster relief helicopters were deployed to extinguish the fire and apply the Disaster Relief Act. By 18:00, 219 people had taken refuge in three evacuation centers. At 16:00, the prefecture requested help from the Japan Self-Defense Forces. By 17:00, Evacuation orders to 2,588 people in 1,229 households in the Kirikiri District of the town. On April 24, firefighters from Yokohama City, Tokyo Metropolis, Hokkaido, Niigata, Fukushima, Tochigi, Ibaraki, Aomori, Akita, Yamagata, and Miyagi Prefecture have been deployed. By April 25, about 1,000 firefighters were deployed and requested the evacuation of 3,233 residents, a third of the town's population. As of April 27, 1,400 firefighters were deployed in the fire. On April 29, Ōtsuchi mayor Kozo Hirano lifted the evacuation order in town, excluding the Nagai and Kozushi district area. All evacuation orders were lifted on April 30. On May 29, the fire was designated by the Japanese government as a "localized severe disaster". Ōtsuchi will received government subsidies to cover the costs of the recovery.

== Impact ==
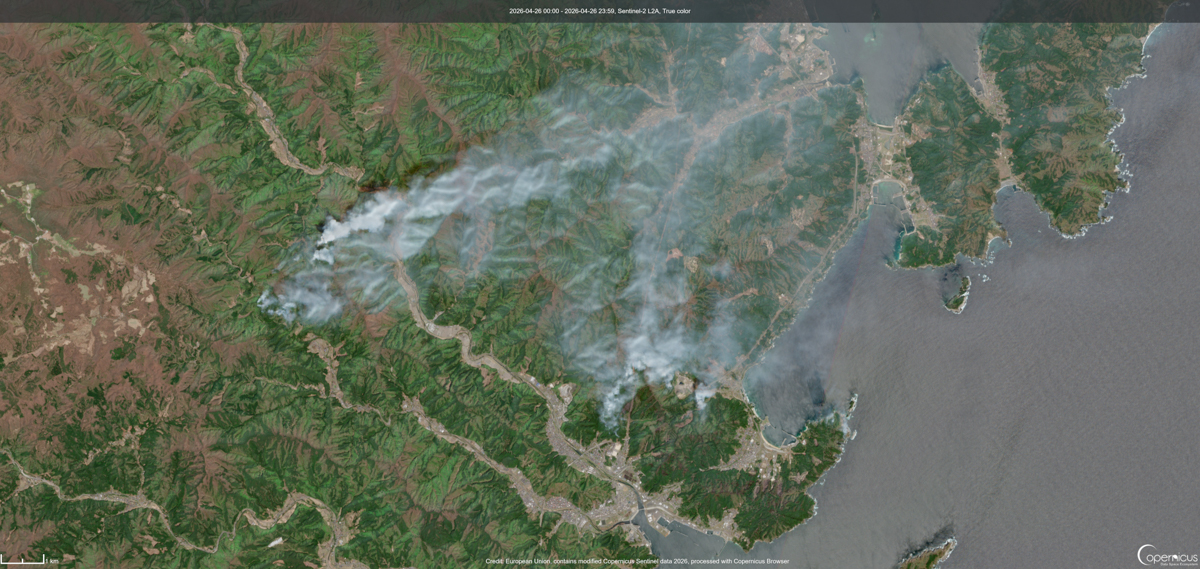
Satellite image of the fire by European Space Agency

The fire was described as one of the worst mountain wildfire disasters in Japan in decades. It is the second largest wildfire in Japan since the start of the Heisei era in 1989, behind the Ōfunato wildfire in February 2025 in Ōfunato in the same prefecture.

Sanriku Railway suspended train services between Kamaishi and Iwate-Funakoshi stations. It resumed services on April 29. A section of the Sanriku Expressway from Yamada-Minami Interchange to Ōtsuchi Interchange was closed. A portion of the National Route 25 in Ōtsuchi was also closed. Several businesses in the town were also closed. Classes across the town were also cancelled. NTT Docomo mobile services in the area have been unavailable or difficult to use since around 5 pm of April 22 in the Kirikiri and Kozuchi districts of the town.

According to the town's official, by April 25, the fire burned eight buildings, including a warehouse and a house. One woman in her 60s was injured after falling down the stairs in an evacuation area. A Firefighter in his 40s was injured in his right arm.

== Investigation ==
On May 12, the Fire and Disaster Management Agency started the investigation of the causes of the fire. On May 16, Minister of Disaster Management Jiro Akama inspected the area.

== See also ==
- 2026 Sanriku earthquake - Earthquake that hit the region two days prior
