= Japanese trade secrets =

In Japan, on June 15, 1991, an amendment to the Unfair Competition Prevention Law (Law No. 47, May 19, 1993) came into effect to include measures for the protection of qualified secret "technical or business information". The Unfair Competition Prevention Law was amended in recognition of the increasing importance of trade secrets in industrial society and, the recent strong international demand for harmonization of intellectual property laws. Prior to the amendments, there was no statute which directly protected trade secrets, although they were protected to some extent under general laws such as contract and tort law.

2003 amendments brought the establishment of criminal sanction for misappropriation of trade secrets.

2004 amendments provided that the protective order be granted in an action relating to trade secrets. Under a disclosure principle of litigation prescribed by Article 82 of the Japanese Constitution, maintaining the confidentiality of any evidence regarding confidential information submitted to the court had been one of the major challenges under the practice of public trials.

== Influences ==
Limitation in the economic development

== See also ==
- Trade policy of Japan
