= Ōfunato wildfire =

2025 fire in Iwate, Japan

- Part of Wildfires in 2025
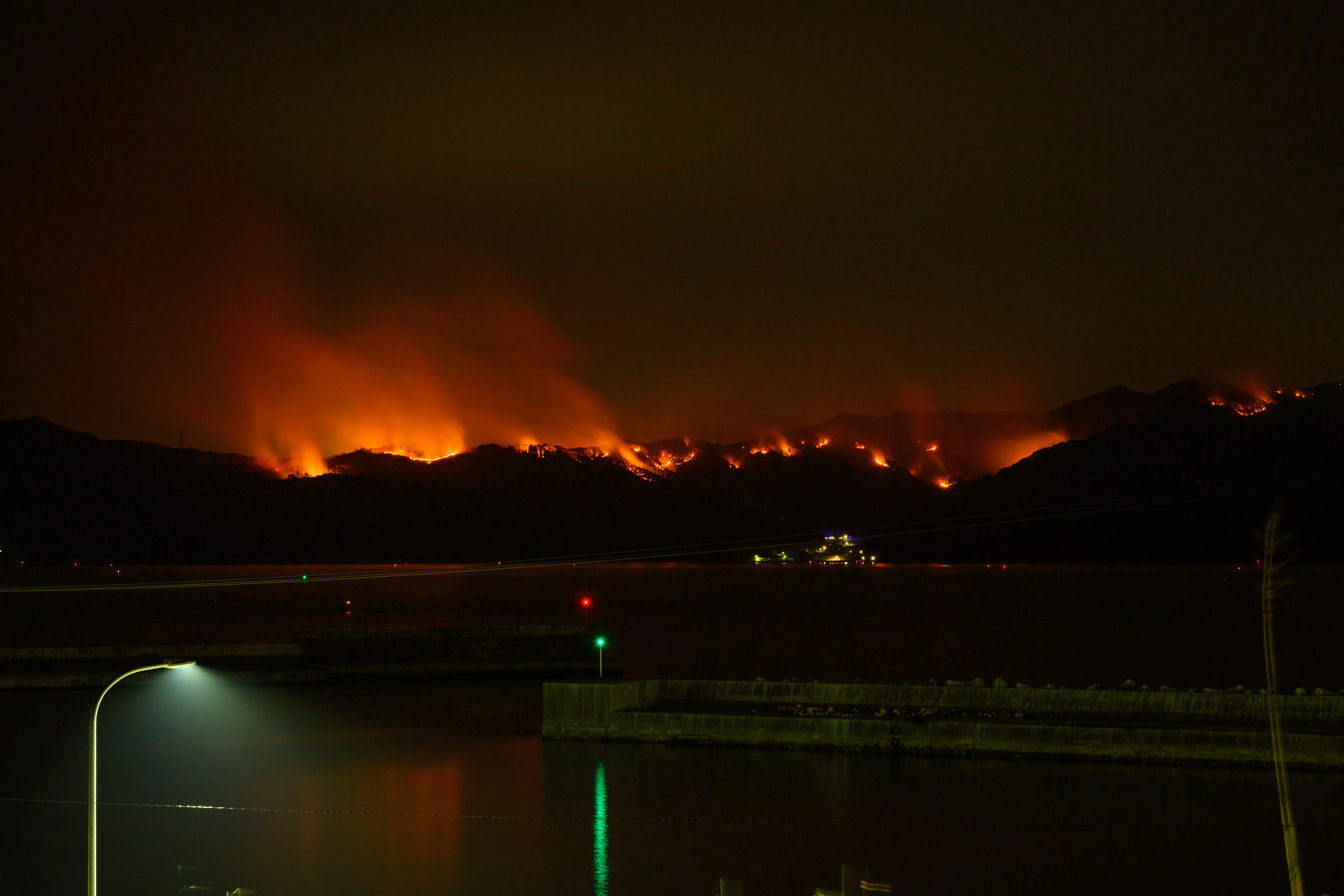
- The fire viewed from Sakihama on 1 March
- Date: 26 February – 9 March 2025
- Location: Ōfunato, Iwate, Japan
- Coordinates: 39.0495°N 141.7887°E

Statistics
- Status: Extinguished
- Burned area: 2,900 ha (7,166 acres; 29 km^{2}; 11 sq mi)

Impacts
- Deaths: 1
- Evacuated: 4,596
- Structures destroyed: 171

Ignition
- Cause: Under investigation

Map
- General location of the fire in Iwate Prefecture General location of the fire in Japan

On 26 February 2025, a wildfire began in the southeast of Ōfunato, a city in the Iwate Prefecture of Japan. The fire grew to cover 2,900 ha (7,200 acres) before it was extinguished on 9 March, making it the largest wildfire in Japan in over 50 years. It destroyed 171 structures, killed one person, and forced over 4,500 people to evacuate.

== Background ==
=== Antecedent conditions ===
Japan had its hottest year on record in 2024. The fire started during Ōfunato's dry season, which runs from January to March. The city had seen the least amount of rainfall in February on record with just 2.5 mm (0.098 in), compared to the average of 41 mm (1.6 in), breaking the previous record of 4.4 mm (0.17 in) set in 1967. Yusuke Yokoyama, a professor at the University of Tokyo's Atmosphere and Ocean Research Institute, attributed the dry conditions to cold, dry air clashing with moist air from the sea.

Yokoyama also mentioned that the fire's quick spread could be due to the topography of the steep mountains where the fire was spreading. Yoshiya Touge, a professor of water resource research at Kyoto University, stated that many of the trees in the area were very flammable conifers which, along with strong air currents in the area, was contributing to the fire's spread.

=== Other fires ===
Two other wildfires had started around Ōfunato in the weeks preceding the blaze. The first was reported on 19 February at 11:55 a.m. in Sanriku Town, Ōfunato City, reporting smoke in the mountains; it grew to 324 ha (800 acres) and was extinguished on 25 February. The second fire was reported in Otomo Town in nearby Rikuzentakata City at 3:20 p.m. on 25 February; it was put out at noon the next day after burning 8 ha (20 acres), including a small area within Ōfunato's borders.

== Progression ==
At 1:02 p.m. on 26 February, the first emergency call was made, which reported a fire in Akasaki Town, Ōfunato City. The first evacuation order was issued at 2:14 p.m. covering the Ryōri area. After becoming stranded at the Koji Fishing Port, 15 people had to be rescued at 5:20 p.m. by the Kamaishi Coast Guard. A Fire and Disaster Management Agency (FDMA) report at 10:30 p.m. stated the fire had grown to 600 ha (1,500 acres). Estimates from the FDMA at 10:40 p.m. placed the number of damaged buildings at 84; by this point, evacuation orders had been issued to 2,114 people in 873 households.

The body of a severely burned man was found on a road in Ryōri on 27 February by local police. At 4:45 p.m. the second evacuation order was issued, covering the Ōdate, Nagahama, Nagasaki, Shimizu, Takonoura and Toguchi areas.

On 28 February, an FDMA report stated the size of the fire was 600 ha (1,500 acres). Another report at 2 p.m. stated the fire had grown to 1,200 ha (3,000 acres), making it Japan's largest wildfire since a fire in Kushiro, Hokkaido, burned 1,030 ha (2,500 acres) in 1992. At 6:13 p.m. another evacuation order was issued covering the Morikko, Nochinoiri, Ōbora, Ubukata, Yado and Yamaguchi areas.

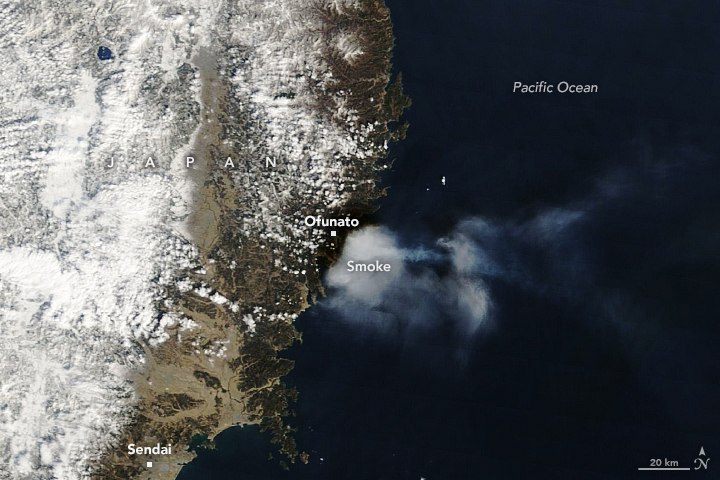
A satellite image of the fire taken on 1 March by NASA

At 7:30 a.m. on 1 March, another order was issued for the Hajimeminenishi, Hajimereitō and Uehajimemine areas. In total, evacuation orders were issued to 1,896 households in Ōfunato City, affecting 4,596 people in 17 districts. An FDMA report at 12 p.m. stated the fire has grown to 1,400 ha (3,500 acres). Another report at 11 a.m. the next day said the fire had grown to 1,800 ha (4,400 acres). By 7 a.m. on 3 March, the FDMA reported the fire had grown to 2,100 ha (5,200 acres). It had grown to 2,600 ha (6,400 acres) at 7 a.m. on 4 March.

According to an FDMA report, the blaze had grown to over 2,900 ha (7,200 acres) by 5 March. This made the fire the largest in Japan in over 50 years, surpassing a fire in 1975 which burned 2,700 ha (6,700 acres) in Hokkaido. A later report stated that 545 teams from 15 prefectures were at the scene, with 2,030 firefighters battling the blaze, as well as 13 aerial firefighting teams comprising 80 people. The first significant rainfall since the fire started began at 4 a.m. on 5 March, ending a 16-day dry spell in some areas; 17 mm (0.67 in) had fallen by 5 p.m. the same day. At a press conference the city said they had not yet been able to investigate the rain's effect; however, the fire brigade confirmed it had not spread further. An on-site investigation confirmed 78 damaged buildings, and noted that not all areas had been investigated and indicated the number may increase.

Aerial firefighting efforts were resumed on 6 March after the bad weather which had caused its suspension the day before had cleared. The city said they were considering lifting evacuation orders in some areas based on fire intensity. On 7 March, evacuation orders affecting 957 people in 415 households were lifted, with the order still in place for 3,639 other people; the fire department noted that there was still a risk of the fire spreading. The prefectural government announced that the body found on 27 February had been identified as a 90-year-old man from Ryōri. The government also announced a plan to designate the fire as a "severe disaster".

On 9 March, evacuation orders were lifted at 1 p.m. for 882 people in 361 households, covering 4 districts. At 5 p.m., after 12 days of burning, the fire department declared that the fire was "suppressed", meaning there was no risk of it spreading. An inspection from city officials found 210 damaged buildings, of which none were public facilities and 171 were completely destroyed: 102 residential buildings (76 destroyed) and 106 non-residential buildings (95 destroyed). At 10 a.m. the next day, all remaining evacuation orders were lifted.

== Response ==
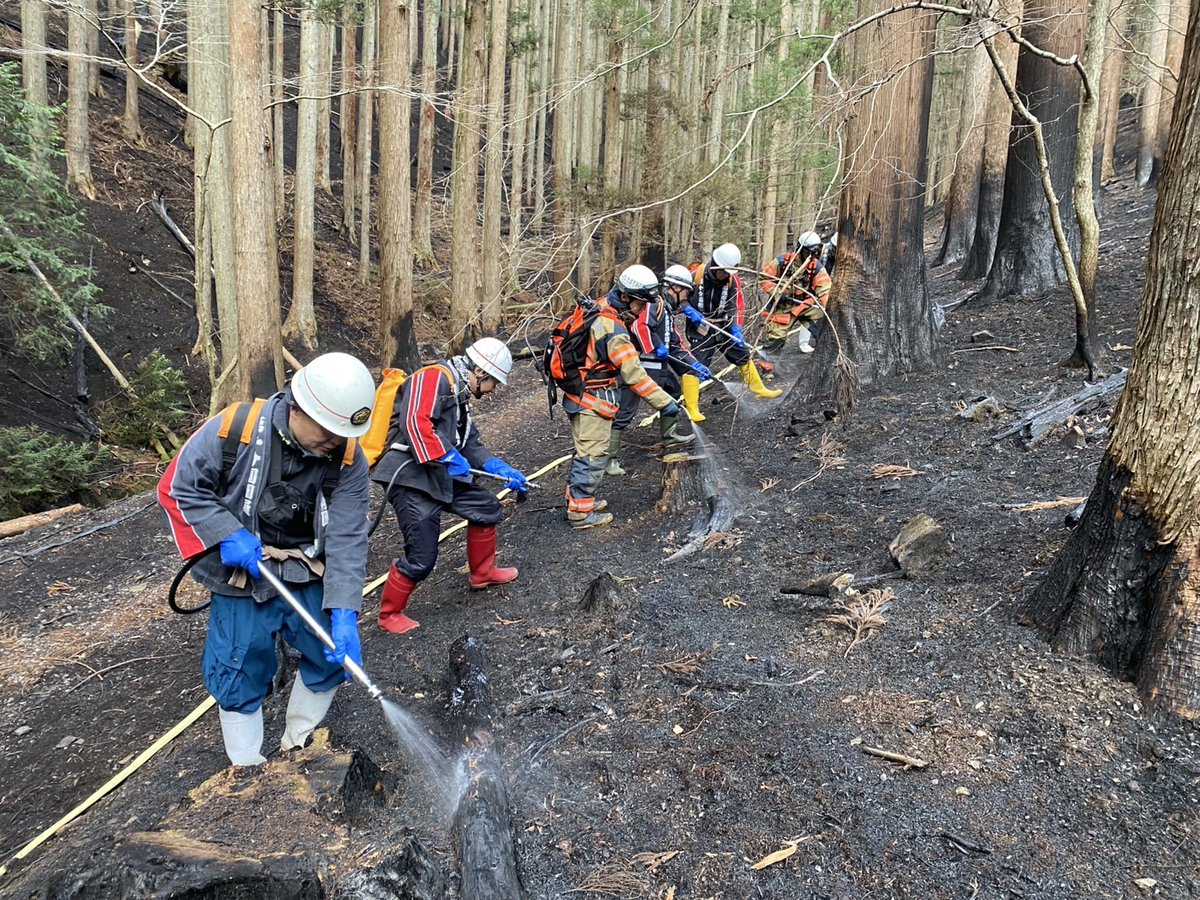
Firefighters working to control the wildfire on 3 March 2025

The initial responses to the fire were made quickly after the fire started on 26 February. The city's government established a disaster response headquarters at 1:33 p.m. which was overtaken by the Iwate Prefectural Government at 3:50 p.m. At 2 p.m., Ōfunato City and Iwate Prefecture requested the dispatch of the Japan Self-Defense Forces to assist with firefighting efforts. The FDMA also established a disaster response headquarters at 2:30 p.m. with the director of the agency's Civil Protection and Disaster Prevention Division as the head; this was later reorganised at 3:34 p.m. so that the FDMA's commissioner general was the head. The prefecture requested the dispatch of an emergency firefighting assistance team at 3:34 p.m. Support was received from the cities of Niigata, Sapporo, Sendai, Tokyo and Yokohama and the prefectures of Akita, Aomori, Chiba, Fukushima, Gunma, Hokkaido, Ibaraki, Kanagawa, Miyagi, Niigata, Saitama, Tochigi, Tokyo Metropolis and Yamagata.

At 7 p.m. on 26 February, the Disaster Relief Act was applied, meaning the costs of emergency relief would be the national and prefectural governments' responsibility. The next day the Disaster Victims' Livelihood Reconstruction Support Act was also applied. At least 16 helicopters, including from the military, are being used to put out the fire. On 5 March, Prime Minister Shigeru Ishiba said he was considering designating the wildfire as a "severe disaster" under the Act on Special Financial Assistance for Dealing with Severe Disasters, which means the government would support the costs of recovery. At the Upper House Budget Committee, he also said victims of the fire will be covered by an existing law.

By 2 p.m. on 6 March, Ōfunato had received 3,622 donations totaling over ¥160 million (US$1.01 million). Among the donors were Roki Sasaki, a native of the city, who gave ¥10 million and donated 500 bedding sets, and the Los Angeles Dodgers, who donated ¥15 million.

On 7 March, Ishiba announced his intentions to designate the fire as a "severe disaster" following a meeting, adding that a cabinet order on the designation will be approved soon. This designation means that the national government will subsidise half of the restoration costs so that the burden on local governments is reduced. The decision to apply the Disaster Victims' Livelihood Reconstruction Support Act was also approved, meaning up to ¥3 million can be provided depending on the extent of damage to homes.

== Impact ==
Structures affected
| | Home | Others | Total |
|---|---|---|---|
| Destroyed | 76 | 95 | 171 |
| Damaged | 26 | 13 | 39 |
| Total | 102 | 108 | 210 |

Tohoku Electric Power cut electricity supplies to around 500 households on 27 February in order to prevent further grid damage. On 28 February, Taiheiyo Cement suspended operations in its factory in Akasaki Town to ensure the safety of its employees.

Three schools in the city are temporarily closed. Sanriku Railway suspended all services between Sakari and Sanriku, which was later extended to Kamaishi on 2 March due to a power outage. Rail replacement buses are operating until the evacuation orders are lifted; however, they did not stop at Rikuzen-Akasaki, Ryōri, Koishihama or Horei in order to bypass the evacuation area. On 2 March, local fishermen were seen evacuating their boats anchored at Ayari Port in Sanriku Town to Ōfunato Fishing Port. They had to travel there by boat as the area was inaccessible by land due to evacuation orders.

On 3 March, around 1,660 households were affected by power outages and 840 were affected by water outages. Many roads were closed, including large parts of Iwate Prefectural Route 9 and part of National Route 45 used by helicopters to land and take off.

On 9 March, it was reported that 2,960 chickens had died at two poultry farms in areas which were under evacuation orders. Neither facility experienced any power outages and their deaths were attributed to a lack of food and water. The next day, after evacuation orders had been lifted, it was found that the fire had majorly impacted the city's fishing industry: multiple fish processing plants were destroyed and many people lost all of their fishing gear.

== Reactions ==
At midnight on 27 February, the Cabinet Secretariat established an information liaison office which was later reorganised into the Prime Minister's countermeasures office at 9 a.m. on 28 February.

On 3 March, Prince Hisahito of Akishino started his first press conference by saying "I'd like to express my heartfelt sympathy to those who were affected".

== See also ==
- 2026 Ōtsuchi wildfires
