= Civil service of Japan =

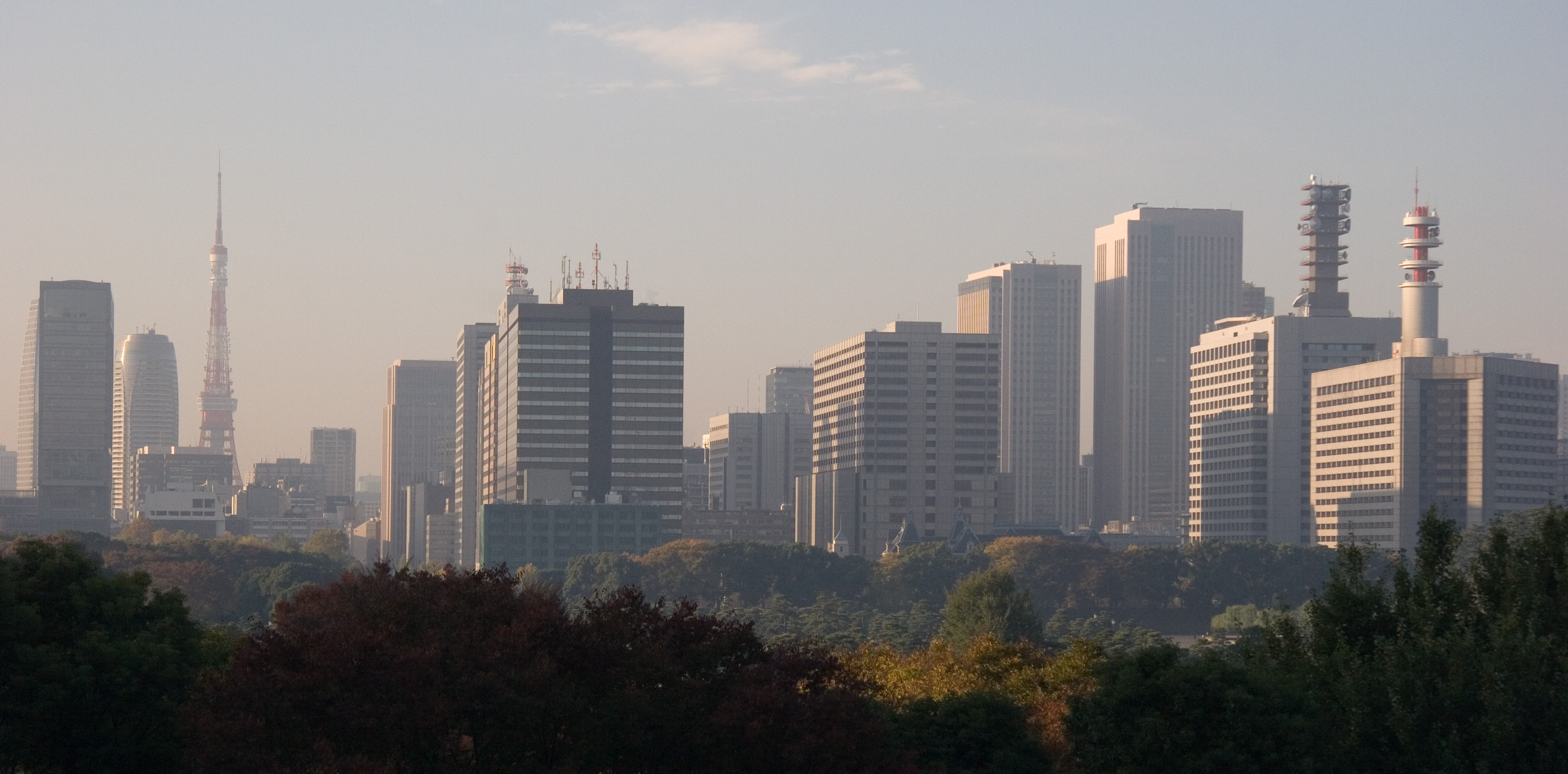
Kasumigaseki is used as metonym for the Japanese civil service

The Japanese civil service employs over three million employees, with the Japan Self-Defense Forces, with 247,000 personnel, being the biggest branch. In the post-war period, this figure has been even higher, but the privatization of a large number of public corporations since the 1980s, including NTT, Japanese National Railways, and Japan Post, already reduced the number.

The majority of civil servants (2.74 million) are employed by local governments, while around 585,000 are national government civil servants. National civil servants are divided into "special" and "regular" service categories. Appointments in the special service category are governed by political or other factors and do not involve competitive examinations. This category includes cabinet ministers, heads of independent agencies, members of the Self-Defense Forces, Diet officials, and ambassadors.

The core of the national civil service is composed of members of the regular service, who are recruited through competitive examinations. This group is further divided into the General Service and the Comprehensive Service, the latter forming a civil service elite.

== Composition of civil service ==
=== Composition ===
As of 2018, there are approximately 3.33 million civil servants in Japan. Among these, the vast majority of around 2.74 million are local civil servants (Japanese: 地方公務員) working for local governments and agencies. Among the around 585,000 national civil servants (Japanese: 国家公務員), roughly 298,000 are in Special Service (Japanese: 特別職) and 287,000 are in Regular Service (Japanese: 一般職).

Special Service includes:

1. Politicians, such as ministers, senior vice-ministers, ambassadors and National Diet members,
2. Judges, court employees, and employees of the Diet,
3. Employees of the Ministry of Defense (approx. 268,000, consisting of the lion's share of Special Service employees), and
4. Other employees with special duties, to whom certain civil service principles (e.g. recruitment by examination and guarantee of status) do not apply, such as Imperial Household Agency employees.

Regular Service employees form the rest of the national civil service, including various ministries and Incorporated Administrative Agencies. After the privatization of Japan Post, the incorporation of certain Japanese universities, and other civil service reforms, the number of regular service employees decreased from over 800,000 to around 287,000 in 2019.

=== Recruitment and examination ===
Civil servants are generally recruited through competitive examinations. Civil servants are classified into three types: (1) Comprehensive Service, which engages in policy-making and research, (2) General Service, which engages mainly in "routine work", and (3) Specialists, such as tax inspectors, air traffic controllers, doctors and teachers, who are recruited by exams or other forms of assessment.

The Comprehensive Service recruits through several types of exams (known as Level I Examination), testing at levels of a university undergraduate or a graduate degree, with different exams based on the division of the Service. The General Service also recruits through exams, with an exam aimed at university graduates (Level II Examination) and an exam for high school graduates (Level III Examination). Successful candidates are interviewed, and final selection takes into account the result of interviews.

Historically, all senior officials were promoted from Comprehensive Service recruits, although there are recent efforts to offer General Service employees opportunities of promotion as well. In the Japanese Cabinet Secretariat, for example, among the 4,715 employees in management positions, 73.1% were recruited by Level I examination, while 21.8% were recruited by Level II and III examinations. Among kachō level (Japanese: 課長級) positions, 87.2% were recruited by Level I examination.

=== Elite bureaucracy ===
According to a Library of Congress report published in 1992, many Japan analysts have pointed to the elite bureaucracy as the people who really govern Japan, although they composed only a tiny fraction of the country's more than 1 million national government employees. The elite civil servants' power was especially strong in the years of rapid economic growth, before the 1990s.

Several hundred of the elite are employed at each national ministry or agency. Although entry into the elite through open examinations does not require a college degree, the majority of its members are alumni of Japan's most prestigious universities. The University of Tokyo law faculty is the single most important source of elite bureaucrats. After graduation from college and, increasingly, some graduate-level study, applicants take a series of difficult higher civil service examinations: in 2009, for example, 22,186 took the tests of higher (the 1st grade) civil service, but only 1,494, or 6.7 percent, were successful. Of those who were successful, only 660 were actually hired.

Like the scholar-officials of imperial China, successful candidates were hardy survivors of a grueling education and testing process that necessarily began in early childhood and demanded total concentration. The typical young bureaucrat, who is in most cases male, is an intelligent, hardworking, and dedicated individual. But some bureaucrats, critics argue, lack imagination and compassion for people whose way of life is different from their own.

The public's attitude toward the elite is ambivalent. The elite enjoy great social prestige, but its members are also resented. They live in a realm that is at least partly public, yet far removed from the lives of ordinary people. Compared with politicians, they are generally viewed as honest. Involvement of top officials in scandals such as the Recruit affair, however, had to some extent tarnished their image.

Japan's elite bureaucrats are insulated from direct political pressure because there are very few political appointments in the civil service. Cabinet ministers are usually career politicians, but they are moved in and out of their posts quite frequently (with an average tenure of under a year), and usually have little opportunity to develop a power base within a ministry, or force their civil service subordinates to adopt reforms. Below the cabinet minister is the administrative vice minister (Japanese: 事務次官 ja:事務次官). Administrative vice ministers and their subordinates are career civil servants whose appointments are determined in accordance with an internally established principle of seniority.

=== Reform of the elite civil service since the 1990s ===
The autonomy and power of the bureaucracy has been substantially reduced since the 1990s. In the 1990s, electoral reforms gave politicians stronger links to their constituencies, strengthening their position. In the 2000s, Prime Minister Junichiro Koizumi reduced the power of “tribal politicians” who spoke for special interests such as farmers, and brought in policy advisers to circumvent the civil service. Successive reforms also restricted the practice of amakudari (Japanese: 天下り), the “descent from heaven”, where retiring bureaucrats were sent to lucrative jobs at the public body they used to oversee. Because of these reforms, since the late 1990s, many top-class candidates in Japanese universities prefer to choose to join investment banks rather than the civil service.

Finally, in 2014, Prime Minister Abe Shinzo again reduced bureaucratic autonomy by centralizing the appointment of all senior civil servants in the Cabinet Office. Civil servants must now impress the prime minister's lieutenants to reach to the top, instead of their civil service colleagues.

Certain commentators have linked the reduction of the civil service's autonomy to recent scandals, including allegations of sexual harassment, falsified documents, obvious lies to parliament and misplaced military records.

=== Women in the civil service ===
In 2020, the Japanese government reported that 36.8% new civil servants hired in fiscal year 2020 were women, a new high. Of 8,461 civil servants hired in the career-track, general, and specialized positions, 3,117 were women. In the percentage of women hired is 1.4% higher than in 2019. By type of positions, 35.4% of new hires in career-track positions were women, compared to 39.1% in general positions, and 33.8% in specialist work.

As late as 2014, the percentage of women in new hires was 20–25%, before a jump to 30% in 2015 and further increases since 2017. The increase in 2015 was accredited to the Cabinet's Fourth Basic Plan for Gender Equality, which set a goal of 30% for new hires in the civil service. From 1990 to 2003, around 10% to 15% of new civil service recruits each year were women.

== History ==
=== Japan before World War II ===
The Japanese had been exposed to bureaucratic institutions at least by the early seventh century A.D. (Nara period), when the imperial court adopted the laws and government structure of Tang China. However, the distinctive Chinese (Confucian) institution of civil service examinations never took root, and the imported system was never successfully imposed on the country at large. But by the middle of the Tokugawa period (1600-1867), the samurai class functions had evolved from military to clerical and administrative functions. Following the Meiji Restoration (1868), the new elite, which came from the lower ranks of the samurai, established a Western-style civil service.

=== Occupied Japan ===
Although the United States occupation dismantled both the military and zaibatsu establishments, it did little, outside of abolishing the prewar Home Ministry, to challenge the power of the bureaucracy. There was considerable continuity —in institutions, operating style, and personnel — between the civil service before and after the occupation, partly because General Douglas MacArthur's staff ruled indirectly and depended largely on the cooperation of civil servants. A process of mutual co-optation occurred. Also, United States policy planners never regarded the civil service with the same opprobrium as the military or economic elites. The civil service's role in Japan's militarism was generally downplayed. Many of the occupation figures themselves were products of President Franklin D. Roosevelt's New Deal and had strong faith in the merits of civil service professionalism. Finally, the perceived threat of the Soviet Union in the late 1940s created a community of interests for the occupiers and for conservative, social order-conscious administrators.

=== 1970s and 1980s ===
In a 1975 article, political scientist Chalmers Johnson quotes a retired vice minister of the Ministry of International Trade and Industry (MITI) who said that the Diet was merely "an extension of the bureaucracy". The official claimed that "the bureaucracy drafts all the laws.... All the legislature does is to use its powers of investigation, which for about half the year keeps most of the senior officials cooped up in the Diet."

In the years since this official made his proud boast, however, it became apparent that there were limits to the bureaucrats' power. The most important was the Liberal Democratic Party of Japan's growing role in policy formation. Political scientist B.C. Koh suggested that in many cases members of the LDP policy-oriented tribes (zoku) had greater expertise in their fields than elite bureaucrats. Before the latter drafted legislation, they had to consult and follow the initiatives of the party's Policy Research Council. Many analysts consider the role of the bureaucracy in drafting legislation to be no greater than that of its counterparts in France, Germany, and other countries. Also, the decision of many retired bureaucrats to run as LDP candidates for the Diet might not reflect, as had been previously assumed, the power of the officials but rather the impatience of ambitious men who wanted to locate themselves, politically, "where the action is."

An intense rivalry among the ministries came into play whenever major policy decisions were formulated. Elite civil servants were recruited by and spent their entire careers in a single ministry. As a result, they developed a strong sectional solidarity and zealously defended their turf. Non-bureaucratic actors—the politicians and interest groups—could use this rivalry to their own advantage.

=== 1990s and beyond ===
==== 1990s ====
The Ministry of Finance is generally considered the most powerful and prestigious of the ministries. Its top officials are regarded as the cream of the elite. Although it was relatively unsuccessful in the 1970s when the deficit rose, the ministry was very successful in the 1980s in constraining government spending and raising taxes, including a twelve-year battle to get a consumption tax passed. The huge national debt in the early 1990s, however, may be evidence that this budget-minded body had been unsuccessful in the previous decade in curbing demands for popular policies such as health insurance, rice price supports, and the unprofitable nationwide network of the privatized Japan Railways Group. Ministry of International Trade and Industry (MITI) frequently encountered obstacles in its early post-occupation plans to reconsolidate the economy. It has not always been successful in imposing its will on private interests, politicians, or other ministries. According to law professor John Owen Haley, writing in the late 1980s, MITI's practice of gyōsei shidō, or administrative guidance, often described as evidence of the bureaucracy's hidden power, was in fact a second-best alternative to "express statutory authority that would have legitimated its exercise of authority." Administrative reform policies in the 1980s imposed ceilings on civil service staff and spending that probably contributed to a deterioration of morale and working conditions.

Still another factor limiting bureaucratic power was the emergence of an affluent society. In the early postwar period, the scarcity of capital made it possible for the Ministry of Finance and MITI to exert considerable influence over the economy through control of the banking system (see Monetary and fiscal policy). To a decreasing extent, this scarcity remained until the 1980s because most major companies had high debt-equity ratios and depended on the banks for infusions of capital. Their huge profits and increasing reliance on securities markets in the late 1980s, however, meant that the Ministry of Finance had less influence. The wealth, technical sophistication, and new confidence of the companies also made it difficult for MITI to exercise administrative guidance. The ministry could not restrain aggressive and often politically controversial purchases by Japanese corporate investors in the United States, such as Mitsubishi Estate's October 1989 purchase of Rockefeller Center in New York City, which, along with the Sony Corporation's acquisition of Columbia Pictures several weeks earlier, heated up trade friction between the two countries.

The whole issue of trade friction and foreign pressure tended to politicize the bureaucracy and promote unprecedented divisiveness in the late 1980s and early 1990s. During the Structural Impediments Initiative talks held by Japan and the United States in early 1990, basic changes in Japan's economy were discussed: reforms of the distribution and pricing systems, improvement of the infrastructure, and elimination of official procedures that limited foreign participation in the economy. Although foreign pressure of this sort is resented by many Japanese as an intrusion on national sovereignty, it also provides an opportunity for certain ministries to make gains at the expense of others. There is hardly a bureaucratic jurisdiction in the economic sphere that is not in some sense affected.

Internationally minded political and bureaucratic elites have found their market-opening reforms, designed to placate United States demands, repeatedly sabotaged by other interests, especially agriculture. Such reactions intensified United States pressure, which in turn created a sense of crisis and a siege mentality within Japan. The "internationalization" of Japan's society in other ways also divided the bureaucratic elite. MITI, the Ministry of Labor, and the Ministry of Justice had divergent views on how to respond to the influx of unskilled, usually South Asian and Southeast Asian, laborers into the labor-starved Japanese economy. An estimated 300,000 to 400,000 of them worked illegally for small Japanese firms in the late 1980s. Ministry of Education, Science, and Culture revision of guidelines on the writing of history textbooks, ostensibly a domestic matter, aroused the indignation of Japan's Asian neighbors because the changes tended to soften accounts of wartime atrocities (see Japanese history textbook controversies).

==== 2000s and 2010s ====
Civil services in Japan underwent significant changes and reforms to work more efficiently in severe budget situation of the government. In 2001, Central Government Reform was implemented to merge existing ministries, strengthen the operation of cabinet and achieve more efficient work. Criticism to civil services from media and the public has got stronger against some scandals, such as the practice of amakudari to assure the advantages of high-rank officials after retirement, salary standard and many other factors.

In 2007, Junichiro Koizumi passed the postal privatisation bills (see ja:聖域なき構造改革). The major concern was Japan Post, with government backing, stymieing competition and giving politicians access to postal savings to fund pet projects. Japan post was split into three companies in 2007, intending to be privatized by 2017. Koizumi also reformed Independent Administrative Institution staff as privatized officers, which reduced half of the civil service. Japan post employed 280,000 people, or one-third of civil servants. However, as of 2020, the government still holds 57% of shares, and March 2028 was announced as the target date of privatization.

In the 2009 general election, the Democratic Party of Japan (DPJ) came to power after many years of Liberal Democratic Party of Japan (LDP) government. DPJ set up the policy of “leadership by politics”, criticized the initiative of bureaucracy in the era of LDP, and planned to reform civil service. However, the DPJ was defeated in the 2012 general election, and the LDP regained power.

In 2014, Prime Minister Abe Shinzo again reduced bureaucratic autonomy by centralizing the appointment of all senior civil servants in the Cabinet Office.

== See also ==
- Law of Japan
- Government of Japan
