= Disaster Relief Act =

Japanese law

Disaster Relief Act 災害救助法 Saigaikyūjo Hō
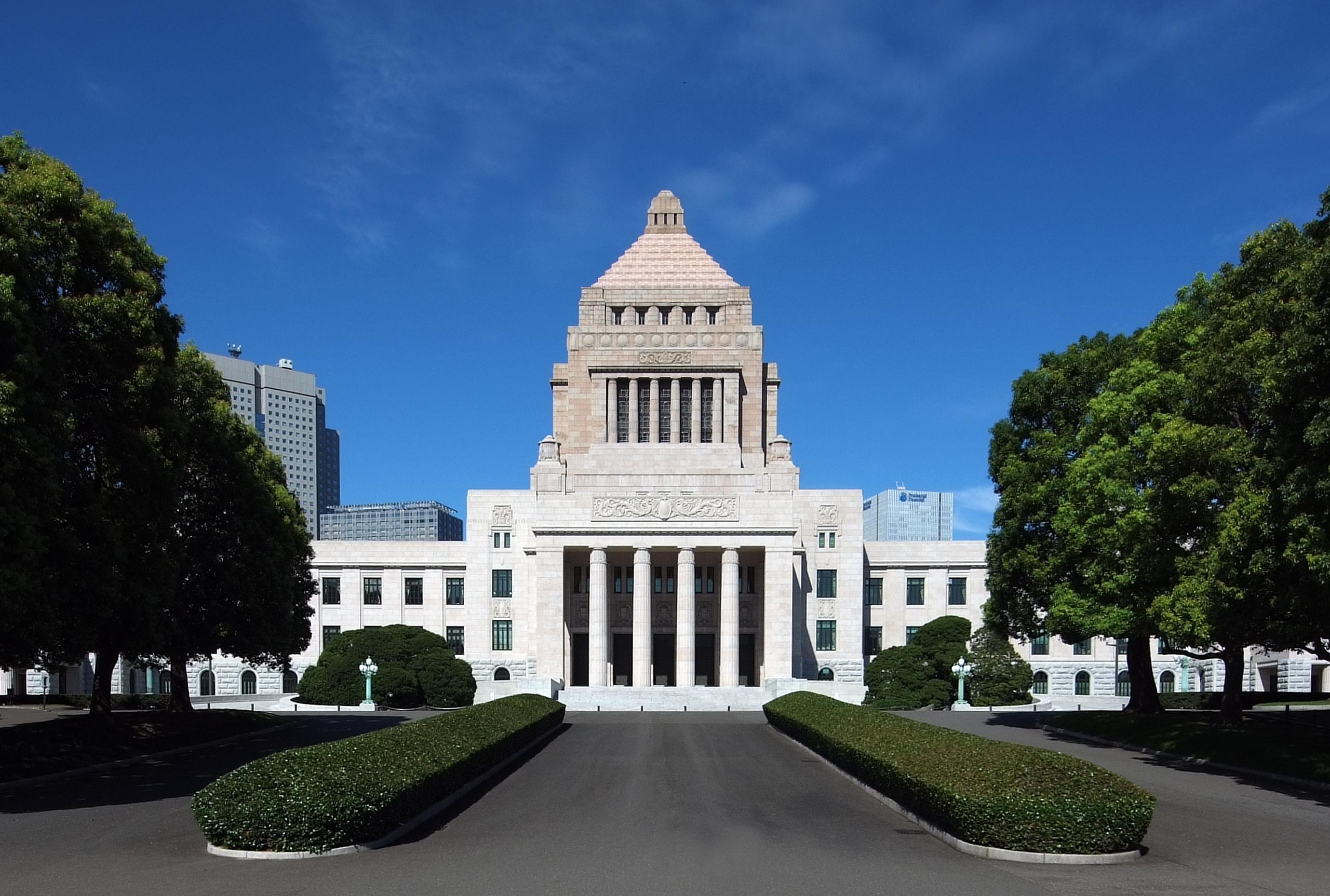
- National Diet Building

Diet of Japan
- Citation: Act No. 118 of 1947
- Territorial extent: Japan
- Enacted: 1947
- Effective: 1947

Amended by
- Last amended in 2022
- Status: In force

The Disaster Relief Act (Japanese: 災害救助法, Hepburn: Saigaikyūjo Hō, Act No. 118 of 1947) is a Japanese law passed on 18 October 1947. It protects disaster victims and maintains social order, including providing emergency temporary housing and daily necessities when a disaster occurs.

Following the 2001 Central Government Reform, the competent authority was designated as the Director-General for Disaster Prevention Policy in the Cabinet Office. When the criteria for the law's application are met, that department coordinates with many other agencies and ministries to carry out its implementation, including the Fire and Disaster Management Agency, the Ministry of Defense, the Ministry of Health, Labour and Welfare, the Ministry of Internal Affairs and Communications and the Ministry of Land, Infrastructure, Transport and Tourism.

== Purpose ==
The purpose of this Act is to ensure that: if a disaster occurs or is likely to occur, the State provides necessary relief as emergency measures through cooperation with local governments, organizations such as the Japanese Red Cross Society, and citizens, and promotes the protection of people who have been affected or are likely to be affected by a disaster and the preservation of social order.

== Contents ==
The Act has five chapters and thirty-five articles, as well as a number of supplementary provisions:

- Chapter I — General Provisions (Articles 1–2)
- Chapter II — Relief (Articles 3–17)
- Chapter III — Expenses (Articles 18–30)
- Chapter IV — Miscellaneous Provisions (Article 31)
- Chapter V — Penal Provisions (Articles 32–35)
- Supplementary Provisions
