= Trade policy of Japan =

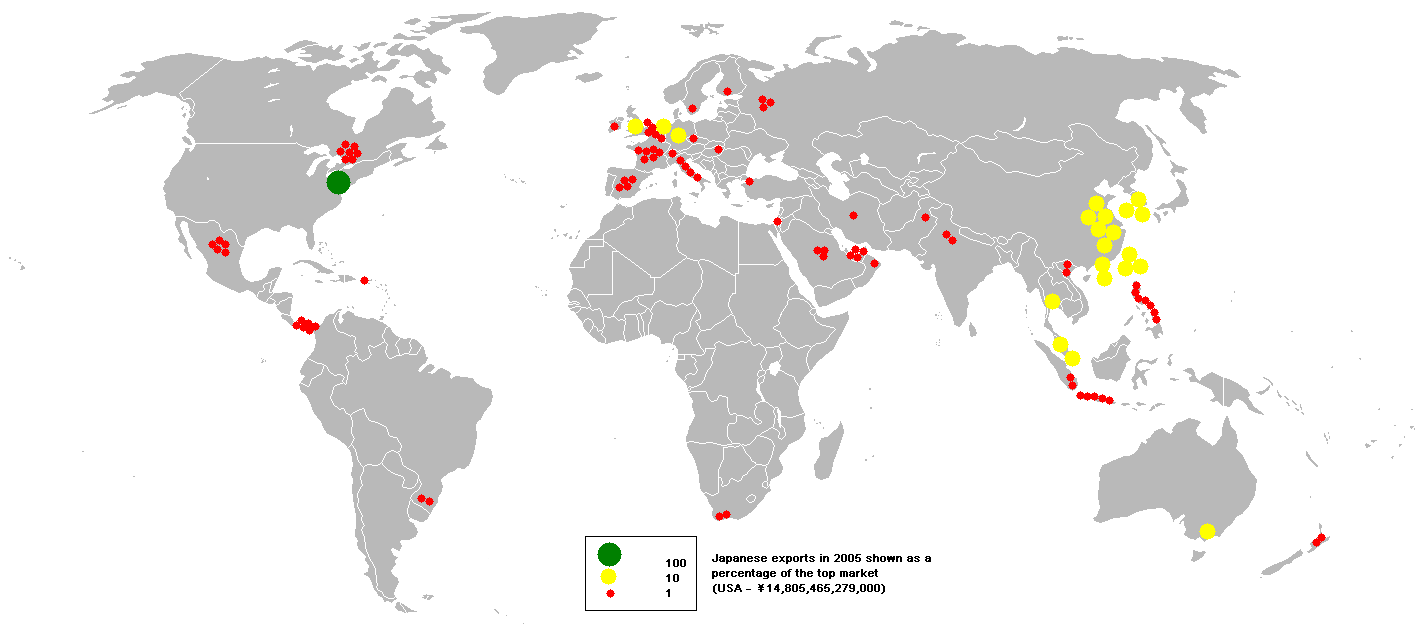
Japanese exports in 2005

Exports of Japan by product category (2019) Chemical products Transportation Machines Mineral products Plastics and rubbers Metals Foodstuffs Precious metals Textiles Instruments Animal products Vegetable products Paper goods Footwear and headwear Miscellaneous Stone and glass Wood products Animal and vegetable bi-products Animal hides Arts and antiques Weapons

The trade policy of Japan related to Japan's approach to import and export with other countries.

== TPP ==
In a diet speech of January 24, 2011, former prime minister Kan proclaimed that Japan would and should participate to the Trans-Pacific Strategic Economic Partnership. This proclamation raised an unusual controversy among Japanese, not only those policy people and media people, but among wide range of people in industry, agriculture, medicine and even writers. The controversy continued until prime minister Noda decided that the Government would start to negotiate with TPP countries on November 11, 2011. Mass media stopped covering the question on a daily basis but the opposition movements continued. Recently Mr. Noda revealed that he will not discuss TPP question at the coming talk with U.S. President Obama on April 30.

== Balance of merchandise trade ==
Between 1960 and 1964, Japan incurred annual trade deficits (based on a customs clearance for imports) ranging from US$400 million to US$1.6 billion. The era of chronic trade deficit ended in 1965, and by 1969, with a positive balance of almost US$1 billion, Japan was widely regarded as a surplus trading nation. In 1971 the surplus reached US$4.3 billion, and its rapid increase was a main factor behind the United States decision to devalue the dollar and pressure Japan to revalue the yen—events that led quickly to the end of the Bretton Woods System of fixed exchange rates. By 1972 Japan's surplus had climbed to US$5.1 billion, despite the reevaluation of the yen in 1971.

The jump in prices of petroleum and other raw materials during 1973 plunged the balance of trade into deficit, and in 1974 the deficit reached US$6.6 billion. With strong export growth, however, this was reversed to a surplus of US$2.4 billion in 1976. The surplus reached a record US$18.2 billion in 1978, promoting considerable tension between the United States and Japan.

In 1979 petroleum prices jumped again, and Japan's trade balance again turned to deficit, reaching US$10.7 billion in 1980. Once again, rapid export growth and stagnant imports returned Japan quickly to surplus by 1981. For the next five years, Japan's trade surplus grew explosively, to a peak of US$82.7 billion in 1986. This unprecedented trade surplus resulted from the moderate annual rise in exports and the drop in imports noted earlier. Underlying these trade developments was the weakness of the yen against other currencies, which enhanced export price competitiveness and dampened import demand.

After 1986 the dollar value of Japan's trade surplus declined, to US$77.6 billion in 1988. This decline came as the yen finally appreciated strongly against the dollar (beginning in 1985) and as a rapid rise in manufactured imports began to offset the large drop in the value of raw material imports. By 1990 the trade surplus had declined to US$52.1 billion.

Underlying trends throughout the 1970s and 1980s were the fundamental strength of Japan's export sector. Under the fixed exchange rates of the 1960s, exports became progressively more competitive on world markets, lifting the country out of the persistent trade deficits that had continued into the early years of the decade. During the 1970s, rapid export expansion extricated the country from the deficits immediately following the two oil price shocks of 1973 and 1979. Continuing export strength then drove the nation to the extraordinary trade surpluses of the 1980s, as the temporary burden of costly oil imports waned.

Japan's fundamental strength in world markets required its fear of vulnerability and opposition to manufactured imports to be reassessed. In the early 1980s, fear of vulnerability remained strong and fed the continuation of policies and behavior that kept manufactured imports unusually low compared with those of the other industrial nations. Only with the large decline in raw material prices and the explosion of trade surpluses did policies and behavior begin to change.

After more than 30 years had trade surpluses, in 2011 the trade deficit came to 2.49 trillion yen ($32 billion), but the previous trade deficit came in 1980 was still a record by 2.6 trillion yen.

== See also ==
- Economic relations of Japan
- Economy of Japan
- Economy of China
