= Fire and Disaster Management Agency =

Japanese government external agency

- 消防庁; Shōbōchō

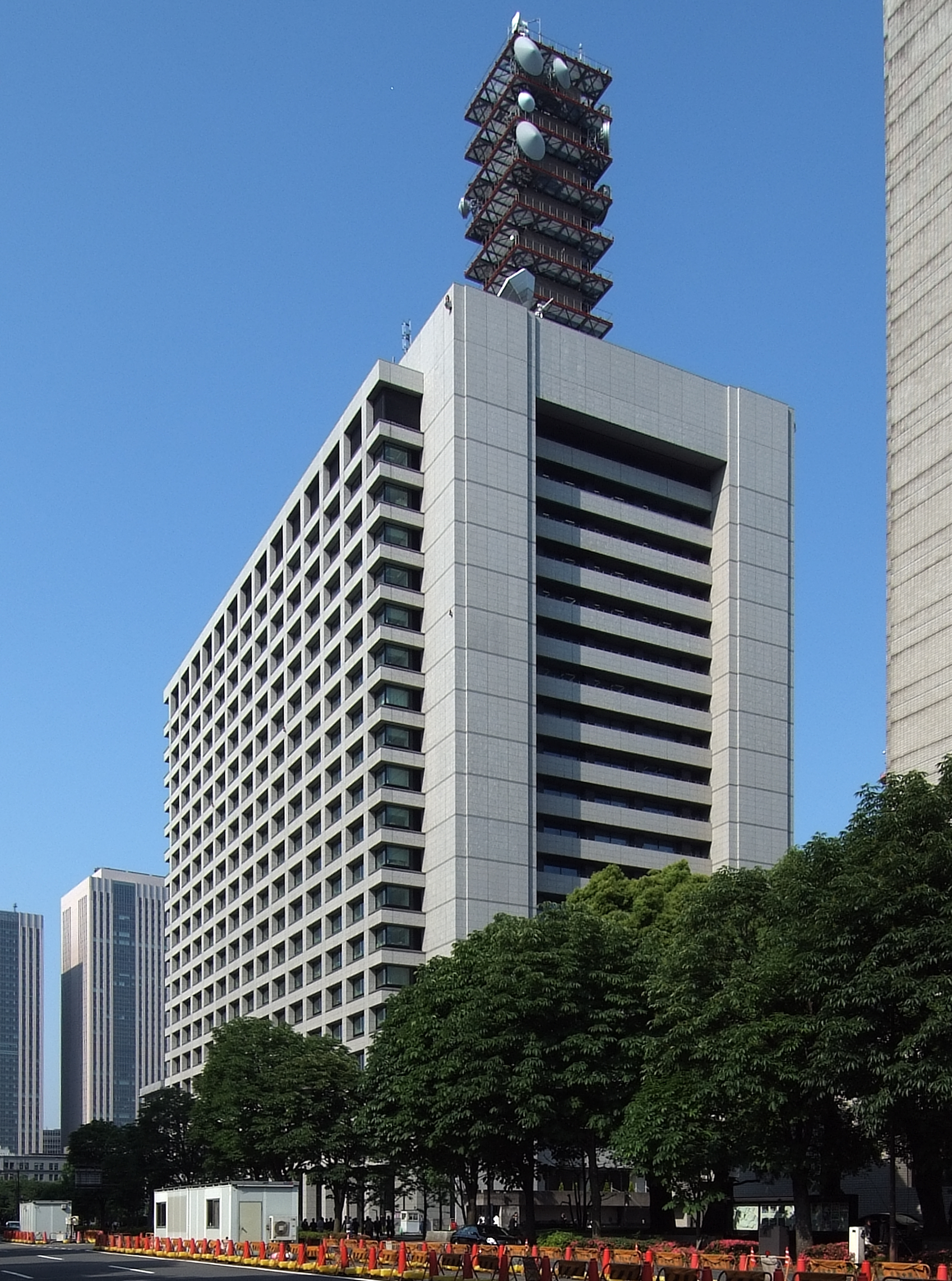
- FDMA headquarters are on the third floor of Building 2 of the Central Common Government Office in Minato, Tokyo.

Agency overview
- Formed: January 15, 1947; 79 years ago
- Jurisdiction: Japan
- Headquarters: Minato, Tokyo, Japan; 35°40′31.9″N 139°45′4.6″E
- Employees: 172
- Annual budget: ¥16,344,273,000 (2020)
- Agency executives: Shinji Yokota, Commissioner; Takeshi Yonezawa, Deputy Commissioner
- Parent ministry: Ministry of Internal Affairs and Communications
- Website: www.fdma.go.jp
- Agency ID: 9000012020003

The Fire and Disaster Management Agency (消防庁, Shōbōchō) (FDMA) is an external agency attached to the Ministry of Internal Affairs and Communications in Japan.

== Background ==
The Fire and Disaster Management Agency was established through article 3 paragraph 2 of the 1948 National Government Organization Act and article 2 of the 1947 Fire Department Organization Law. The agency is charged with supervising firefighting efforts as well as project planning, ordinance enforcement, and establishing standards and policies regarding fire fighting.

The agency does not handle the actual fire fighting, direct management, or day-to-day activities of the individual municipal departments, but they own and maintain the fire engines, helicopters, and other support vehicles used by the various departments nationwide. They also provide training, guidance, and other support for each department.

There are prefectural FDMA offices throughout Japan to help handle any natural disasters, terroristic attacks, and the like. Some of its structure since 2003 is modeled after the Federal Emergency Management Agency in the United States. It was established to provide a unified way of approaching and handling any sort of disaster. Its 2020 budget was ¥16,344,273,000.

== History ==
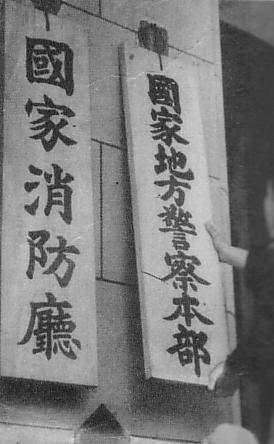
Doorplate (left) of the Fire Disaster Management Agency

- 15 January 1947 – The Fire Department Division (消防課, Shōbōka) is formed within the Home Ministry Police Affairs Bureau.
- 31 December 1947 – The Home Ministry is dissolved.
- 1 January 1948 – The Fire Department Division becomes the first department within the Internal Affairs Bureau.
- 7 March 1948 – The Internal Affairs Bureau is dissolved. The Fire Department Organization Law takes effect. The FDMA is established within the National Public Safety Commission.
- 1 August 1951 – The Fire Fighting Training Site is established as an auxiliary and the Administrative Education Section is established as a subordinate group.
- 1 August 1952 – The FDMA is reorganized, and the NPSC establishes the headquarters of the FDMA. The Administrative Education Section is dissolved, and the Fire Research Institute is established as an auxiliary at the headquarters office.
- 20 April 1959 – The Fire Fighting Training Site is reorganized, establishing the Fire and Disaster Management College.
- 1 July 1960 – Autonomous agencies are reorganized, and the Ministry of Home Affairs is established. The National Fire Fighting Home Office is separated from the National Public Safety Commission, becoming an external agency attached to the Ministry of Home Affairs.
- 1 July 1961 – The position of Deputy Director is established for the FDMA.
- 6 January 2001 – As part of the 2001 Central Government Reform, the FDMA became an external agency attached to the Ministry of Internal Affairs and Communications.
- 1 April 2001 – The Fire Research Institute is made into a separate agency and renamed to National Research Institute of Fire and Disaster.
- 15 August 2005 – The FDMA is established as an internal agency to handle civil and natural disaster protection.
- 1 April 2006 – The National Research Institute of Fire and Disaster is dissolved, and the Fire Research Institute takes over its responsibilities and is reorganized as an internal department within the Fire and Disaster Management College.

== See also ==
- Tokyo Fire Department
- National Police Agency
