= 2001 Central Government Reform =

The 2001 Central Government Reform (中央省庁再編, Chūō Shōchō Saihen) by the Japanese government involved the establishment of a new ministry, the merging of existing ministries and the abolition of others. This resulted in little more than a change of ministry names (with the exception of the Environment Agency which gained ministry status — a longtime goal).

The objectives of the reform were:

1. Establishing a System with More Effective Political Leadership
2. Restructuring of National Administrative Organs
3. More Transparent Administration
4. Drastic Streamlining of the Central Government

== Establishing a System with More Effective Political Leadership ==
=== Amendment of Cabinet Law ===
1. The government put emphasis on the principle that sovereign power resides with the people in the article 1 on amendment of the Cabinet Law.
2. The number of Ministers of State has been changed to "not more than fourteen" from "not more than twenty".
3. Prime minister's authority to propose and cabinet secretary's planning and drafting function have been clarified.
4. Three Assistant Cabinet Secretaries, a Cabinet Secretary for Public Relations, and a Cabinet Secretary for Information Research have been created within the Cabinet Secretariat, replacing the posts of Chief Cabinet Councillor on Internal Affairs, Chief Cabinet Councillor on External Affairs, Director-General of the Cabinet Office for National Security Affairs and Crisis Management, Director-General of the Cabinet Public Relations Office, and Director-General of the Cabinet Information Research Office.
5. The fixed number of Special Advisors has been increased from three to five; and the number of Private Secretaries currently fixed by law will be provided by Cabinet order.
6. Opening the Cabinet Secretariat's posts to individuals from both inside and outside of the Government.

=== Establishment of the Cabinet Office ===
1. The Chief Cabinet Secretary and Ministers for Special Missions directly assist the Prime Minister. The three State Secretary posts and three Parliamentary Secretary posts have been installed in the Office.
2. The Prime Minister will be able to appoint the Ministers for Special Missions at his discretion, when he considers the appointment highly necessary for the cohesiveness of the policies of administrative branches. Ministers for Special Missions will always be appointed respectively for the affairs concerning Okinawa and Northern policies, and those under the jurisdiction of the Financial Services Agency.
3. Director-General-level positions for special missions have been introduced in the Cabinet Office.
4. The Councils on important policies are set up within the Office to form an organ that "contributes to the planning and drafting, and comprehensive coordination needed for the integration of the policies of administrative branches."
5. The National Public Safety Commission, the Defense Agency and the Financial Services Agency have been re-positioned as independent organs within the Office. Also, the Defense Facilities Administration Agency will remain in the Defense Agency.

== Restructuring of National Administrative Organs ==
The then-1 Office and 22 Ministries were reorganised into 1 Cabinet Office and 12 Ministries, including the Environment Agency into a ministry. The Cabinet Office would then be able manage policy co-ordination on issues that concerned two or more ministries more effectively.

The administrative reform reorganised the Ministries according to their main "purposes" in a way that they could perform as synthetic and coherent a function as possible. In order to prevent sectionalism, which has been pointed out for its detrimental effects and respond to issues flexibly and cohesively, systems of policy coordination have been constructed so that related administrative organs, in light of their purposes, hold deliberations on their inter-Ministerial measures. A system of policy evaluation has been introduced for the government itself to evaluate the effects of its policies before and after implementation, and to utilize the result of evaluation in the planning and drafting of policies.

== More Transparent Administration ==
Administrative reform included the introduction of Independent Administrative Institution (IAI), which are organisationally independent from the government. These reforms enabled these IAIs to operate national museums and research institutes.

== Drastic Streamlining of the Central Government ==
The number of national civil servants were to be reduced by 25% over the decade as well as a general reduction of government organs.

- No. of bureaus reduced from 128 to 96 (by 25%)
- No. of divisions reduced from approximately 1200 to 1000 (by 20%).
- No. of Minister's Secretariats to be reduced as well as a review of affiliated facilities

Central Government Ministries
After Reform
Cabinet Office
National Public Safety Commission
Defense Agency
Ministry of Public Management, Home Affairs, Posts and Telecommunications
Ministry of Justice
Ministry of Foreign Affairs
Ministry of Finance
Ministry of Education, Culture, Sports, Science and Technology
Ministry of Health, Labour and Welfare
Ministry of Agriculture, Forestry and Fisheries
Ministry of Economy, Trade and Industry
Ministry of Land, Infrastructure and Transport
Ministry of the Environment

=== Other ===
1. Reinforcement of Political Leadership by the Introduction of the State Secretary
2. Realignment and Rationalization of the Policy Councils
