= Namiitakaigan Station =

Railway station in Ōtsuchi, Iwate Prefecture, Japan

Coordinates: 39.3837°N 141.9353°E

Namiitakaigan Station 浪板海岸駅
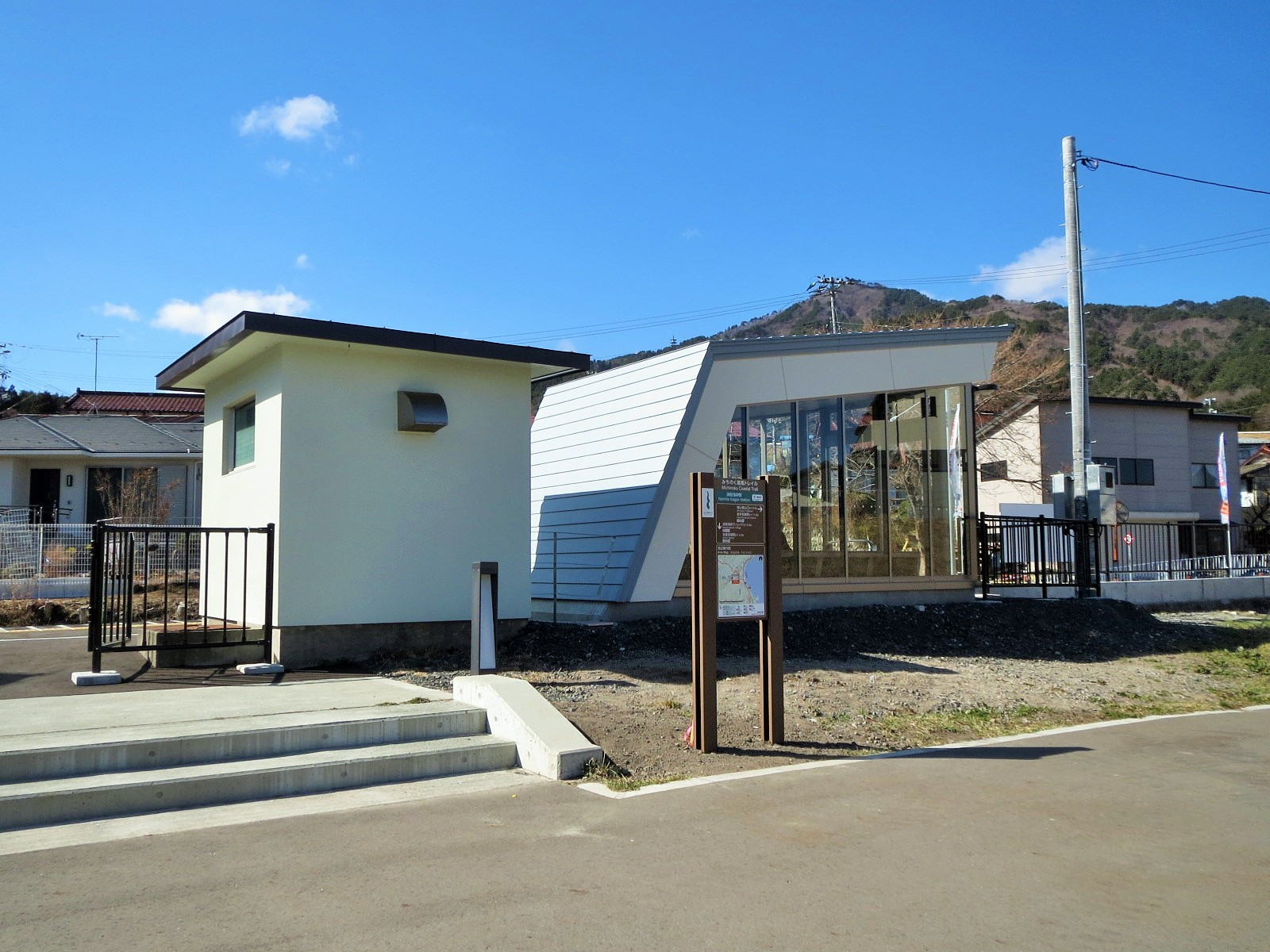
- Namiitakaigan Station in March 2019

General information
- Location: Kirkiri, Ōtsuchi, Kamihei, Iwate （岩手県上閉伊郡大槌町吉里吉里） Japan
- Operator: Sanriku Railway
- Line: ■ Rias Line
- Distance: 54.1 km from Sakari

History
- Opened: 1961
- Former names: Namiita (until 1994)
Location

Namiitakaigan Station (浪板海岸駅, Namiitakaigan-eki) is a Sanriku Railway Company railway station located in Ōtsuchi, Iwate Prefecture, Japan.

== Lines ==
Namiitakaigan Station is served by the Rias Line, and was located 54.1 rail kilometers from the terminus of the line at Morioka Station. Formerly, it was served by the Yamada Line.

== Station layout ==
Namiitakaigan Station had a single side platform serving traffic in both directions. There was no station building, but only a shelter on the platform. The station was unattended.

== Adjacent stations ==
«	Service	»
Rias Line
Kirikiri	-	Iwate-Funakoshi

== History ==
Namiitakaigan Station opened on 20 December 1961 as Namiita Station (浪板駅, Namiita-eki). The station was absorbed into the JR East network upon the privatization of the Japan National Railways (JNR) on 1 April 1987. It was renamed to its present name on 3 December 1994. Operations on the Yamada Line between Miyako Station and Kamaishi Station were suspended after the 11 March 2011 Tōhoku earthquake and tsunami, which severely damaged the tracks and area surrounding the station. As of 2018, the station have been rebuilt along with the rest of the closed segment of the Yamada Line. It was transferred to the Sanriku Railway upon completion on 23 March 2019. This segment joined up with the Kita-Rias Line on one side and the Minami-Rias Line on the other, which together constitutes the entire Rias Line. Accordingly, this station became an intermediate station of Rias Line.

== Surrounding area ==
- National Route 45
- Namiita Beach
