= Sokei Station =

Railway station in Miyako, Iwate Prefecture, Japan

Coordinates: 39.6300°N 141.9608°E

Sokei Station 磯鶏駅
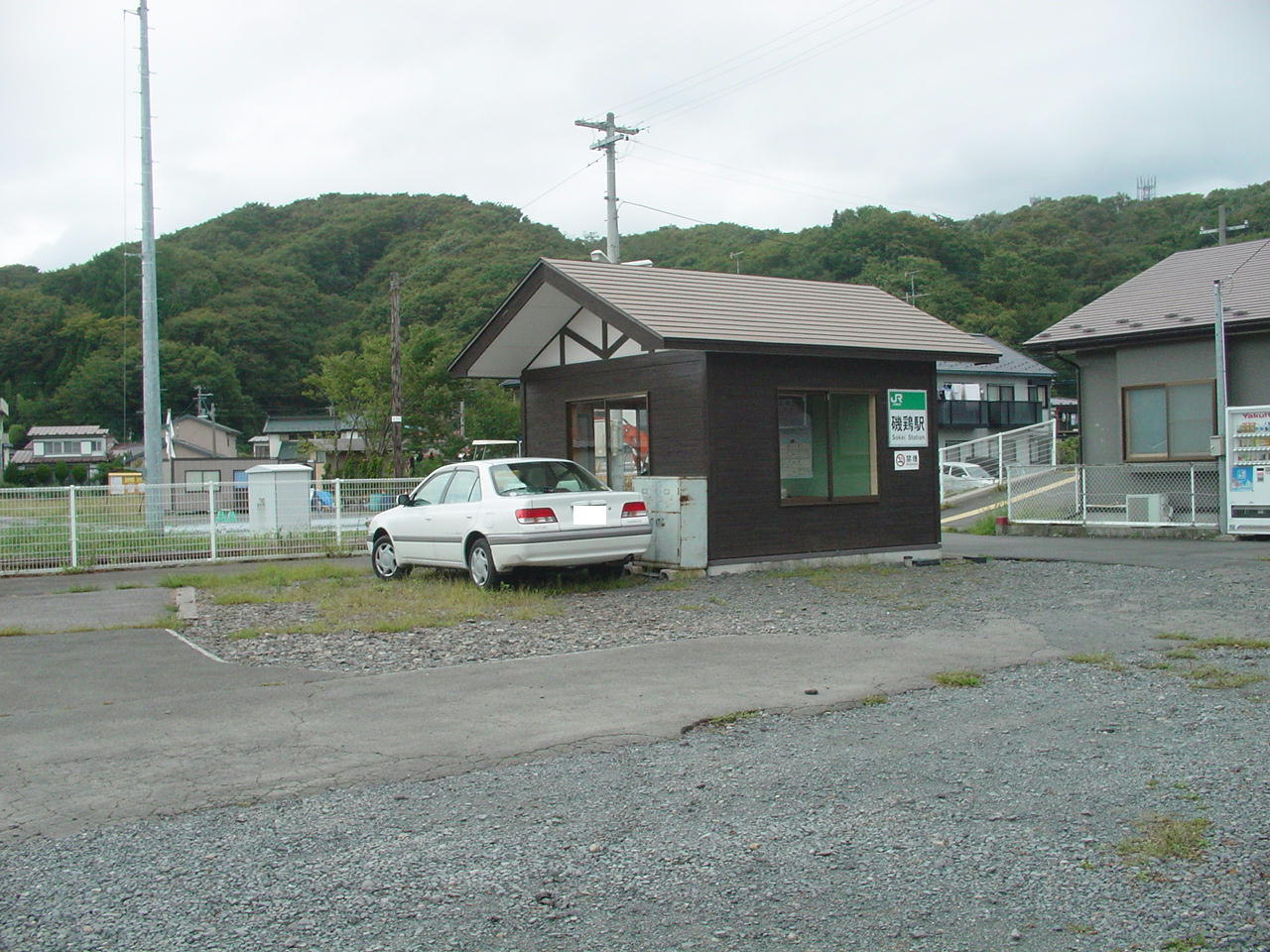
- Sokei Station in September 2007

General information
- Location: Sokei-Ishizaki 13, Miyako, Iwate （岩手県宮古市磯鶏石崎13） Japan
- Operator: Sanriku Railway
- Line: ■ Rias Line
- Distance: 90.0 km from Sakari

History
- Opened: 1935
Location

Sokei Station (磯鶏駅, Sokei-eki) is a Sanriku Railway Company station located in Miyako, Iwate Prefecture, Japan.

== Lines ==
Sokei Station is served by the Rias Line, and is located 90.0 rail kilometers from the terminus of the line at Sakari Station. Formerly, it was served by the Yamada Line.

== Station layout ==
Sokei Station had a single side platform serving traffic in both directions. The station was unattended.

== Adjacent stations ==
«	Service	»
Rias Line
Yagisawa-Miyakotandai	-	Miyako

== History ==
Sokei Station opened on 17 November 1935. The station was absorbed into the JR East network upon the privatization of the Japan National Railways (JNR) on April 1, 1987. Operations on the Yamada Line between Miyako Station and Kamaishi Station were suspended after the 11 March 2011 Tōhoku earthquake and tsunami. This segment of the Yamada Line have been rebuilt as of 2018. It was transferred to the Sanriku Railway upon completion on 23 March 2019. This segment joined up with the Kita-Rias Line on one side and the Minami-Rias Line on the other, which together constitutes the entire Rias Line. Accordingly, this station became an intermediate station of Rias Line.

== Surrounding area ==
- National Route 45
