= Tsugaruishi Station =

Railway station in Miyako, Iwate Prefecture, Japan

Coordinates: 39.5817°N 141.9374°E

Tsugaruishi Station 津軽石駅
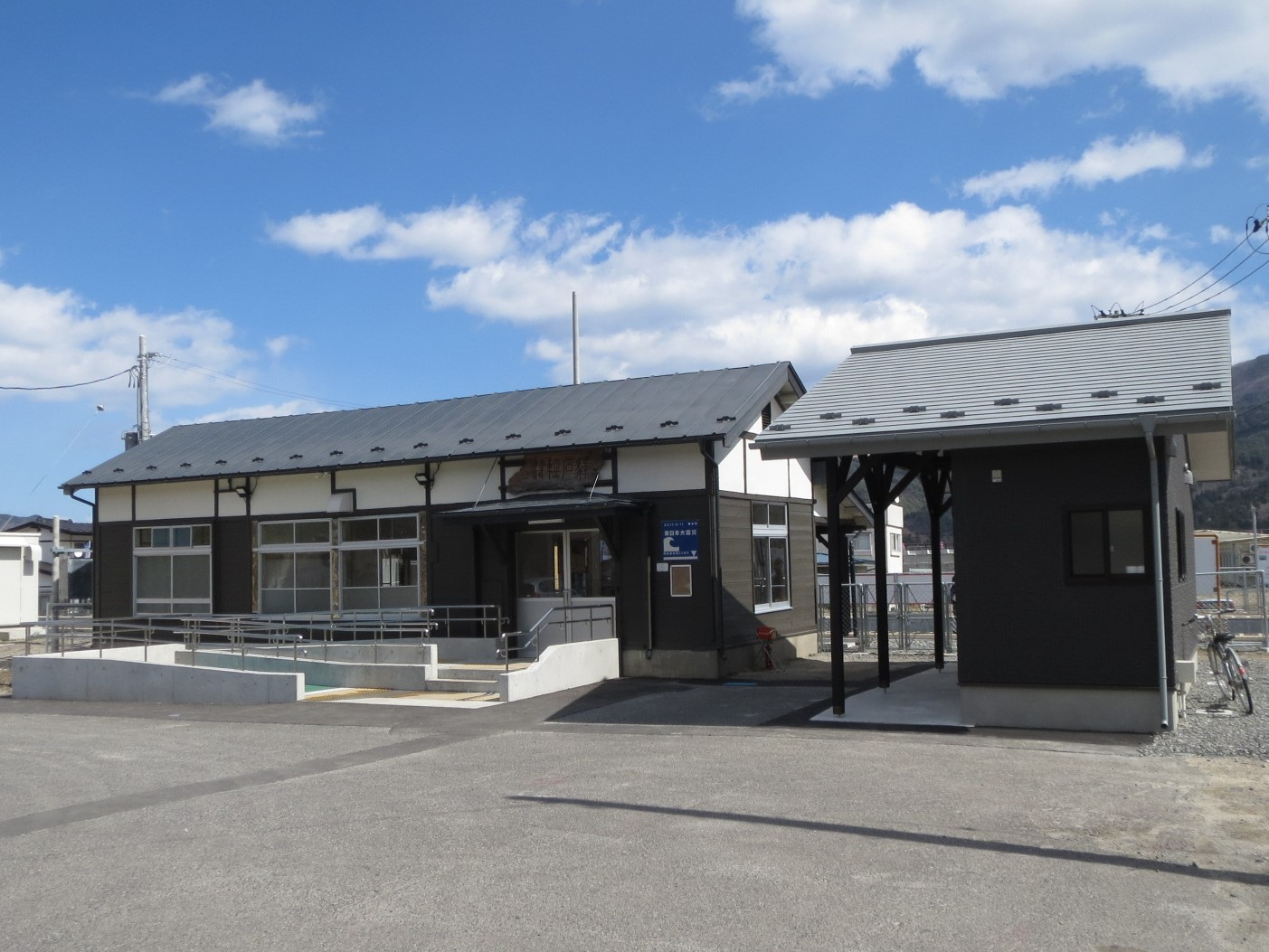
- Tsugaruishi Station in March 2019

General information
- Location: Tsugaruishi dai-5 jiwari 60, Miyako, Iwate （岩手県宮古市津軽石第5地割60） Japan
- Operator: Sanriku Railway
- Line: ■ Rias Line
- Distance: 82.8km from Sakari

History
- Opened: 1935

Passengers
- FY2012: 100 daily
Location

Tsugaruishi Station (津軽石駅, Tsugaruishi-eki) is a Sanriku Railway station located in Miyako, Iwate Prefecture, Japan.

== Lines ==
Tsugaruishi Station is served by the Rias Line, and was located 82.8 rail kilometers from the terminus of the line at Sakari Station. Formerly, it is served by the Yamada Line.

== Station layout ==
Tsugaruishi Station had two opposed side platforms connected to the station building by a level crossing. The station was staffed.

=== Platforms ===
1	■ Rias Line	for Miyako, and Kuji
2	■ Rias Line	for Kamaishi, and Sakari

== Adjacent stations ==
«	Service	»
Rias Line
Haraigawa	-	Yagisawa-Miyakotandai

== History ==
Tsugaruishi Station opened on 17 November 1935. The station was absorbed into the JR East network upon the privatization of the Japan National Railways (JNR) on 1 April 1987. The station was destroyed during the 11 March 2011 Tōhoku earthquake and tsunami. A KiHa 100 series train, which was at the station at the time, was also derailed and destroyed. As of 2018, the station has been rebuilt along with the rest of the closed segment of the Yamada Line. It was transferred to the Sanriku Railway upon completion on 23 March 2019. This segment joined up with the Kita-Rias Line on one side and the Minami-Rias Line on the other, which together constitutes the entire Rias Line. Accordingly, this station became an intermediate station of Rias Line.

== Surrounding area ==
- National Route 45
- Tsugaruishi Post Office
