= Orikasa Station =

Railway station in Yamada, Iwate Prefecture, Japan

Coordinates: 39.4474°N 141.9595°E

Orikasa Station 織笠駅
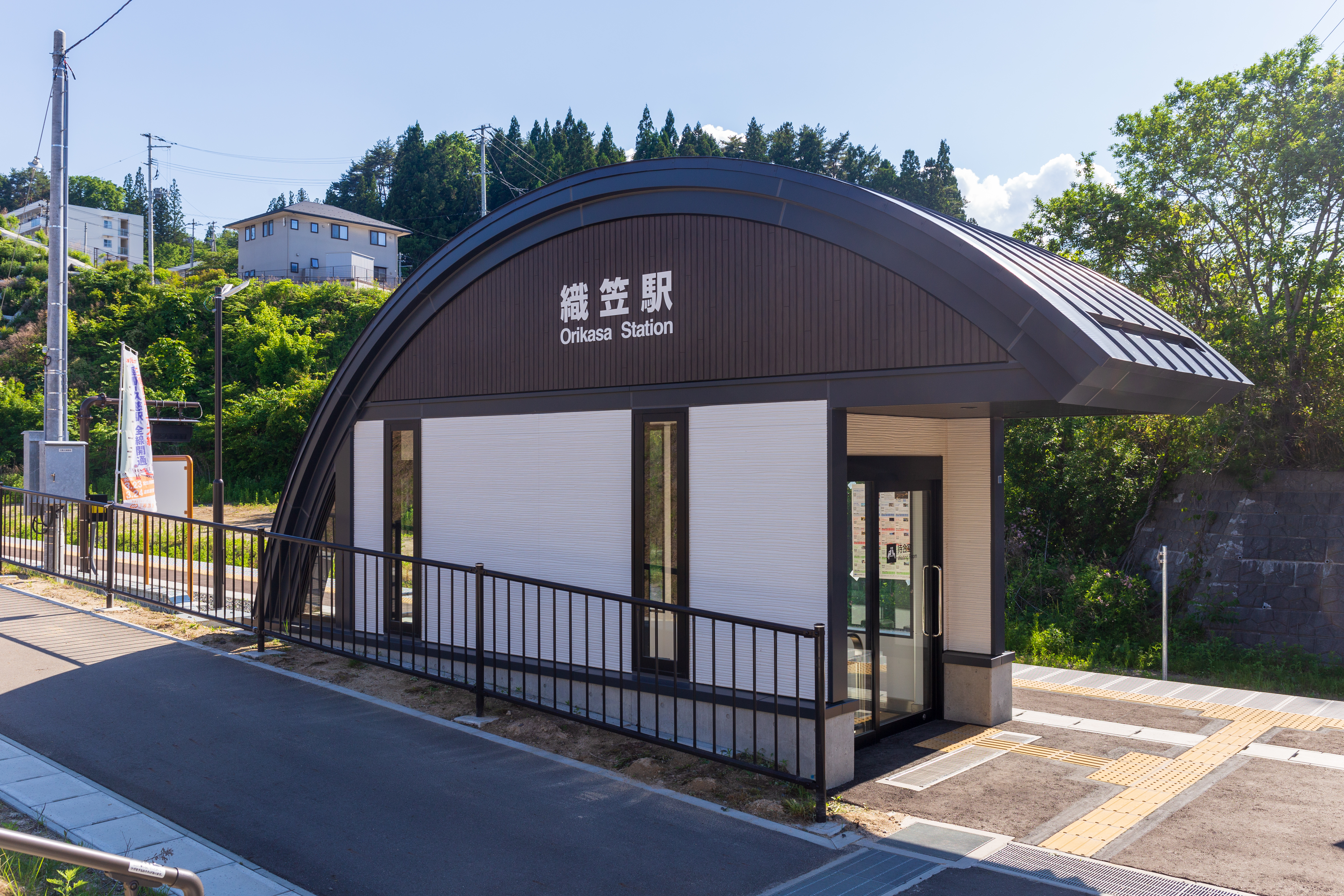
- Orikasa Station in June 2019

General information
- Location: Orikasa, Yamada, Shimohei, Iwate （岩手県閉伊郡山田町織笠） Japan
- Operator: Sanriku Railway
- Line: ■ Rias Line
- Distance: 64.3 km from Sakari

History
- Opened: 1935
Location

Orikasa Station (織笠駅, Orikasa-eki) is a Sanriku Railway Company railway station located in Yamada, Iwate Prefecture, Japan.

== Lines ==
Orikasa Station is served by the Rias Line, and was located 64.3 rail kilometers from the terminus of the line at Sakari Station. Formerly, it was served by the JR East Yamada Line.

== Station layout ==
Orikasa Station have a single side platform serving traffic in both directions. The station was unattended.

== Adjacent stations ==
«	Service	»
Rias Line
Iwate-Funakoshi	-	Rikuchū-Yamada

== History ==
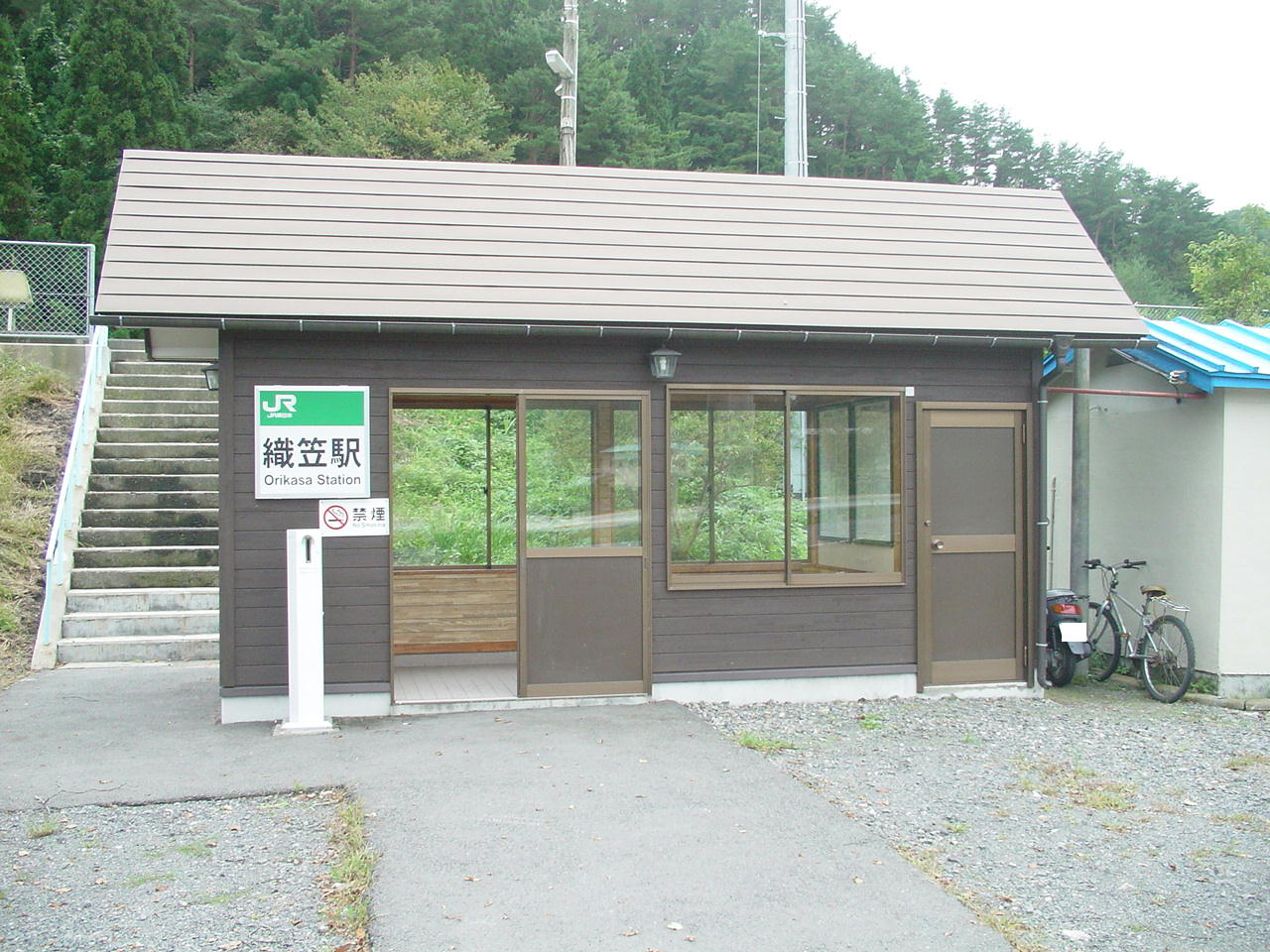
The old Orikasa Station in September 2007, which was washed away by the tsunami.

Orikasa Station opened on 10 November 1936. The station was absorbed into the JR East network upon the privatization of the Japan National Railways (JNR) on April 1, 1987. The station was washed away by the March 11, 2011 Tōhoku earthquake and tsunami. As of 2018, the station was rebuilt along with the rest of the closed segment of the Yamada Line. Its location is somewhat north of the original site flooded by the tsunami. It was transferred to the Sanriku Railway upon completion on 23 March 2019. This segment joined up with the Kita-Rias Line on one side and the Minami-Rias Line on the other, which together constitutes the entire Rias Line. Accordingly, this station became an intermediate station of Rias Line.

== Surrounding area ==
- National Route 45
- Orikasa Post Office
