= Toyomane Station =

Railway station in Yamada, Iwate Prefecture, Japan

Coordinates: 39.5343°N 141.9246°E

Toyomane Station 豊間根駅
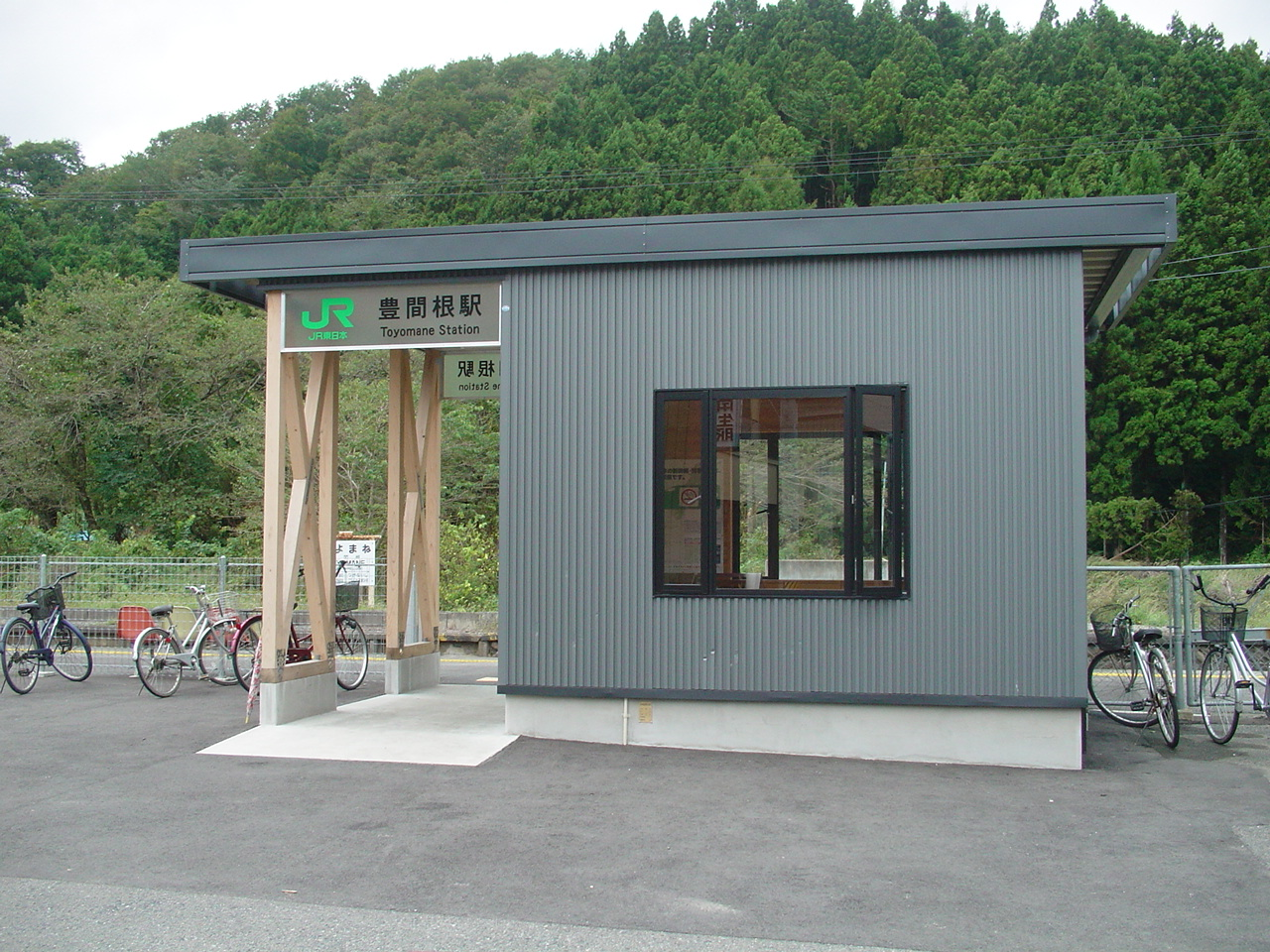
- Toyomane Station in September 2007

General information
- Location: Toyomane Dai-3 jiwari, Yamada, Shimohei, Iwate （岩手県閉伊郡山田町豊間根第3地割） Japan
- Operator: Sanriku Railway
- Line: ■ Rias Line
- Distance: 76.6km from Sakari

History
- Opened: 1935
Location

Toyomane Station (豊間根駅, Toyomane-eki) is a Sanriku Railway Company station located in Yamada, Iwate Prefecture, Japan.

== Lines ==
Toyomane Station is served by the Rias Line, and was located 76.6 rail kilometers from the terminus of the line at Sakari Station. Formerly, it is served by the Yamada Line.

== Station layout ==
Toyomane Station have a single side platform serving traffic in both directions. The station was unattended.

== Adjacent stations ==
«	Service	»
Rias Line
Rikuchū-Yamada	-	Haraigawa

== History ==
Toyomane Station opened on 17 November 1935. The station was absorbed into the JR East network upon the privatisation of the Japan National Railways (JNR) on April 1, 1987. Operations on the Yamada Line between Miyako Station and Kamaishi Station were suspended after the 11 March 2011 Tōhoku earthquake and tsunami. This segment of the Yamada Line have been rebuilt as of 2018. It was transferred to the Sanriku Railway upon completion on 23 March 2019. This segment joined up with the Kita-Rias Line on one side and the Minami-Rias Line on the other, which together constitutes the entire Rias Line. Accordingly, this station became an intermediate station of Rias Line.

== Surrounding area ==
- National Route 45
- Todogasaki Lighthouse
- Toyomane Post Office
