= Iwate-Funakoshi Station =

Railway station in Yamada, Iwate Prefecture, Japan

Coordinates: 39.4316°N 141.9741°E

Iwate-Funakoshi Station 岩手船越駅
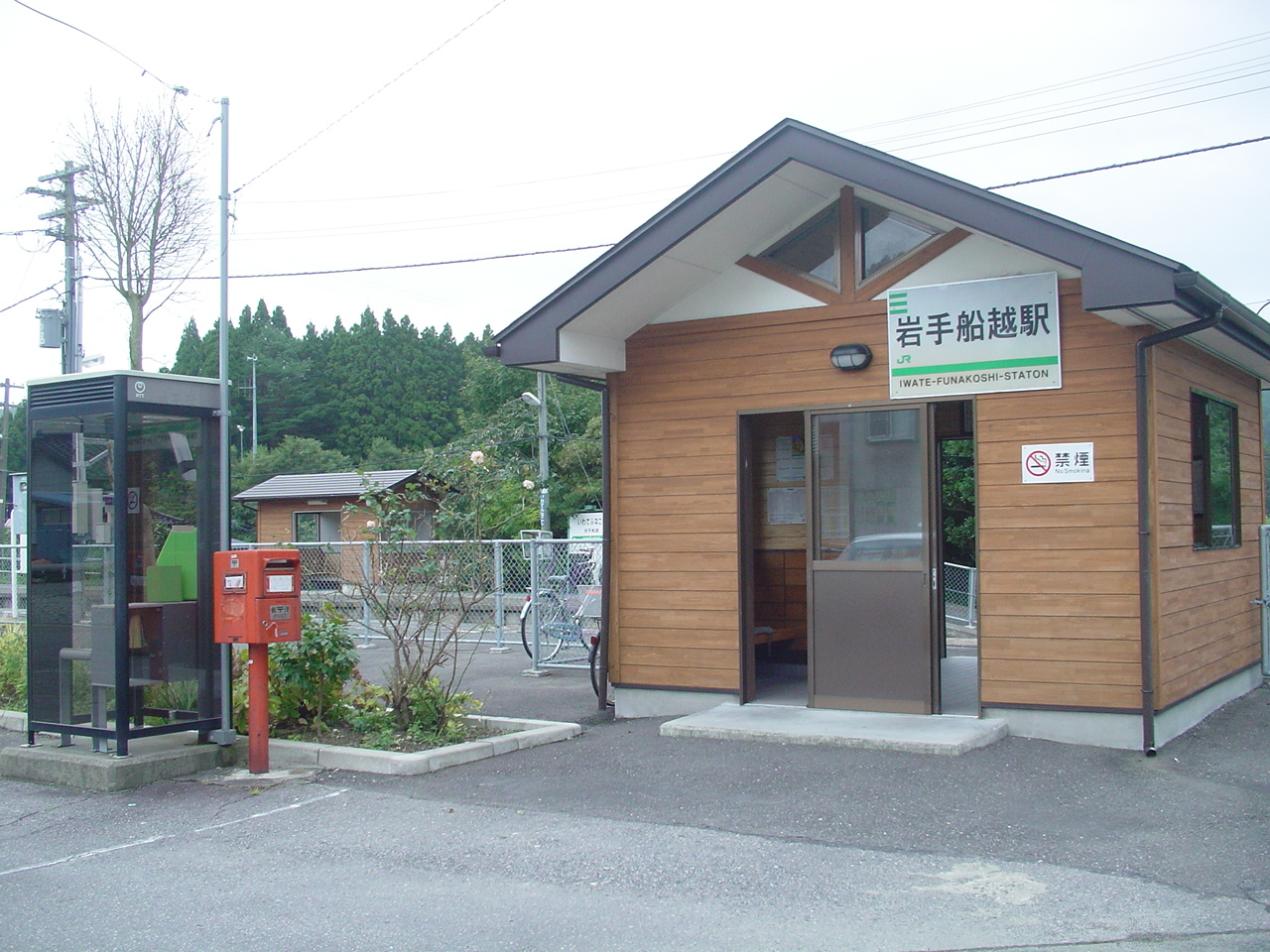
- Iwate-Funakoshi Station in September 2007

General information
- Location: Funakoshi dai-6 jiwari 28, Yamada, Shimohei, Iwate （岩手県下閉伊郡山田町船越第6地割28） Japan
- Operator: Sanriku Railway
- Line: ■ Rias Line
- Distance: 60.5 km from Sakari

History
- Opened: 1936
Location

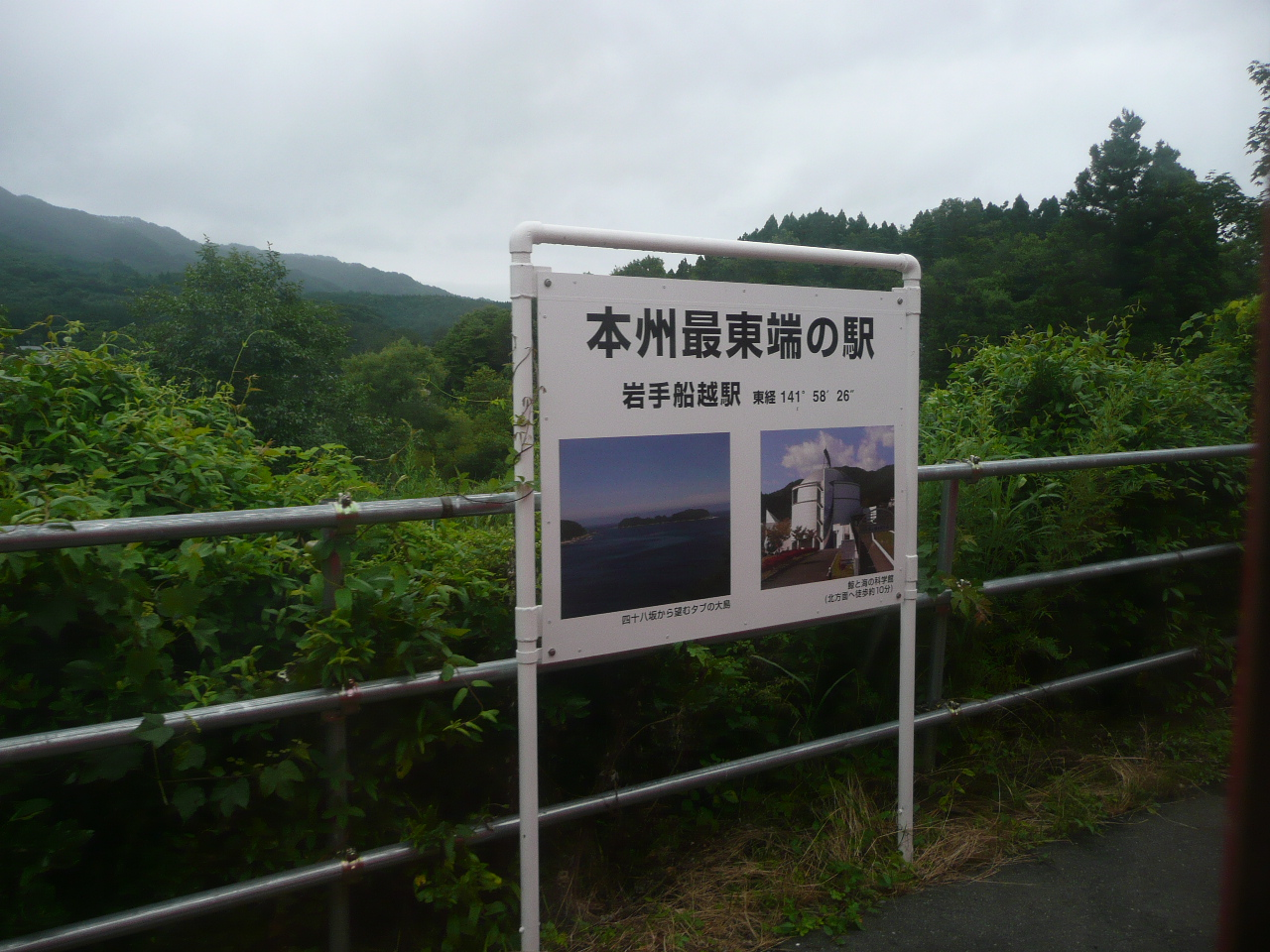
"Easternmost station in Honshu"

Iwate-Funakoshi Station (岩手船越駅, Iwate-Funakoshi-eki) is a Sanriku Railway Company station located in Yamada, Iwate Prefecture, Japan. The station claims to be the easternmost railway station on Honshu island.

== Lines ==
Iwate-Funakoshi Station is served by the Rias Line, and was located 60.5 rail kilometers from the terminus of the line at Sakari Station. Formerly, it is served by the Yamada Line.

== Station layout ==
Iwate-Funakoshi Station have two opposed side platforms. The station is unattended.

=== Platforms ===
1	■ Rias Line	for Miyako , and Kuji
2	■ Rias Line	for Kamaishi , and Sakari

== Adjacent stations ==
«	Service	»
Rias Line
Namiitakaigan	-	Orikasa

== History ==
Iwate-Funakoshi Station opened on 10 November 1936. The station was absorbed into the JR East network upon the privatization of the Japan National Railways (JNR) on 1 April 1987. Operations on the Yamada Line between Miyako Station and Kamaishi Station were suspended after the 11 March 2011 Tōhoku earthquake and tsunami. As of 2018, the station have been rebuilt along with the rest of the closed segment of the Yamada Line. It was transferred to the Sanriku Railway upon completion on 23 March 2019. This segment joined up with the Kita-Rias Line on one side and the Minami-Rias Line on the other, which together constitutes the entire Rias Line. Accordingly, this station became an intermediate station of Rias Line.

== Surrounding area ==
- National Route 45
- Funakoshi Post Office
