= Haraigawa Station =

Railway station in Miyako, Iwate Prefecture, Japan

Haraigawa Station 払川駅
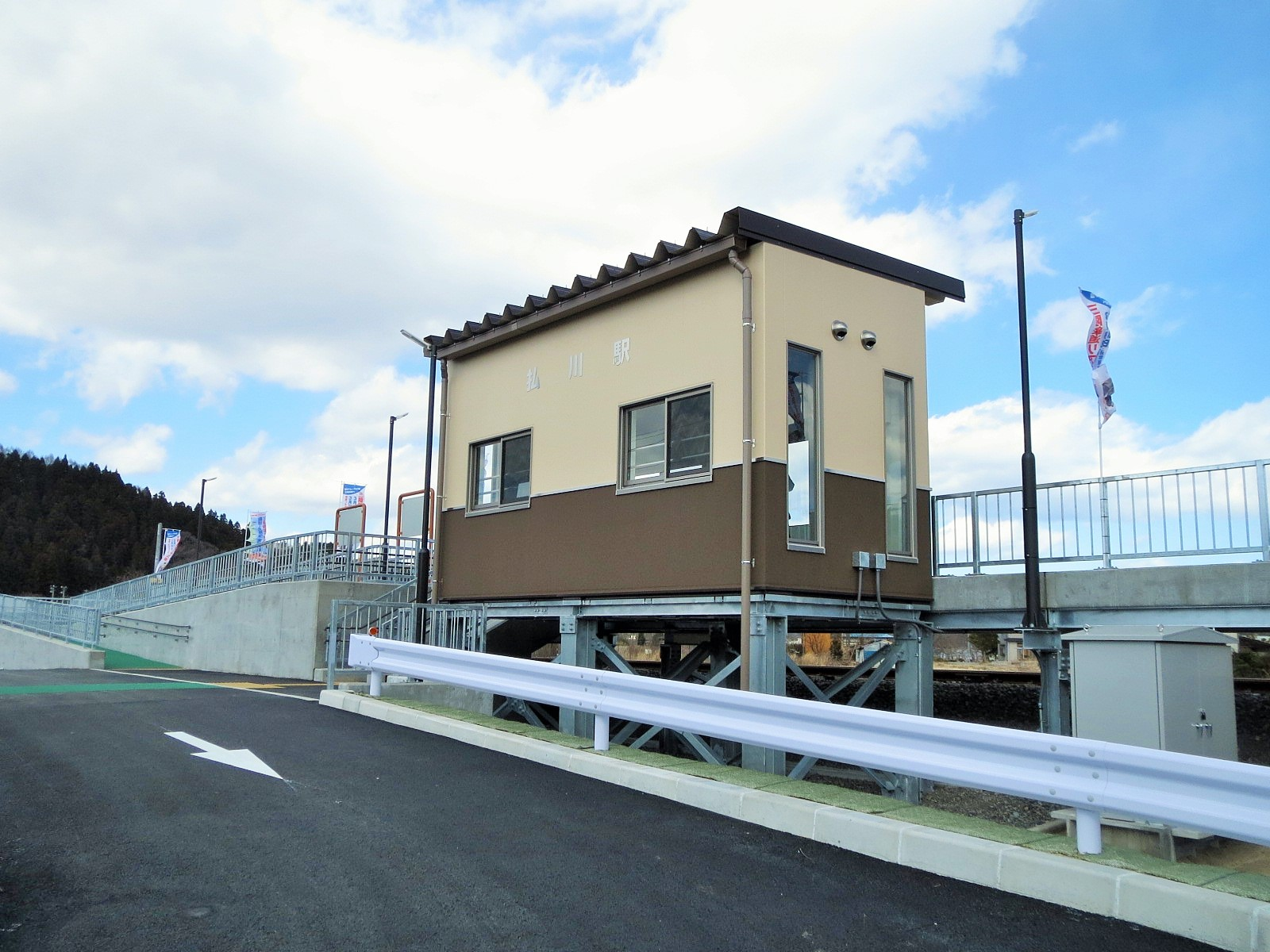
- Haraigawa Station in March 2019

General information
- Location: 336-3 Tsugaruishi Dai-13 jiwari, Miyako, Iwate （岩手県宮古市津軽石第13地割336番3） Japan
- Coordinates: 39.5611°N 141.9360°E
- Operator: Sanriku Railway
- Line: ■ Rias Line
- Distance: 80.7km from Sakari
- Platforms: 1 side platform

History
- Opened: March 23, 2019
Location

Haraigawa Station (払川駅, Haraigawa-eki) is a Sanriku Railway Company station located in Miyako, Iwate Prefecture, Japan.

== Station layout ==
Haraigawa Station has a side platform serving a single track. A small shelter is provided on the platform.

== History ==
Haraigawa station opened between Toyomane Station and Tsugaruishi Station on 23 March 2019, simultaneously completed to reconstruct a section of Yamada Line between Miyako Station and Kamaishi Station and its transfer to Sanriku Railway's Rias Line.

== Adjacent stations ==
«	Service	»
Rias Line
Toyomane	-	Tsugaruishi

== Surrounding area ==
- National Route 45
