= Rikuchū-Yamada Station =

Railway station in Yamada, Iwate Prefecture, Japan

Coordinates: 39.4633°N 141.9516°E

Rikuchū-Yamada Station 陸中山田駅
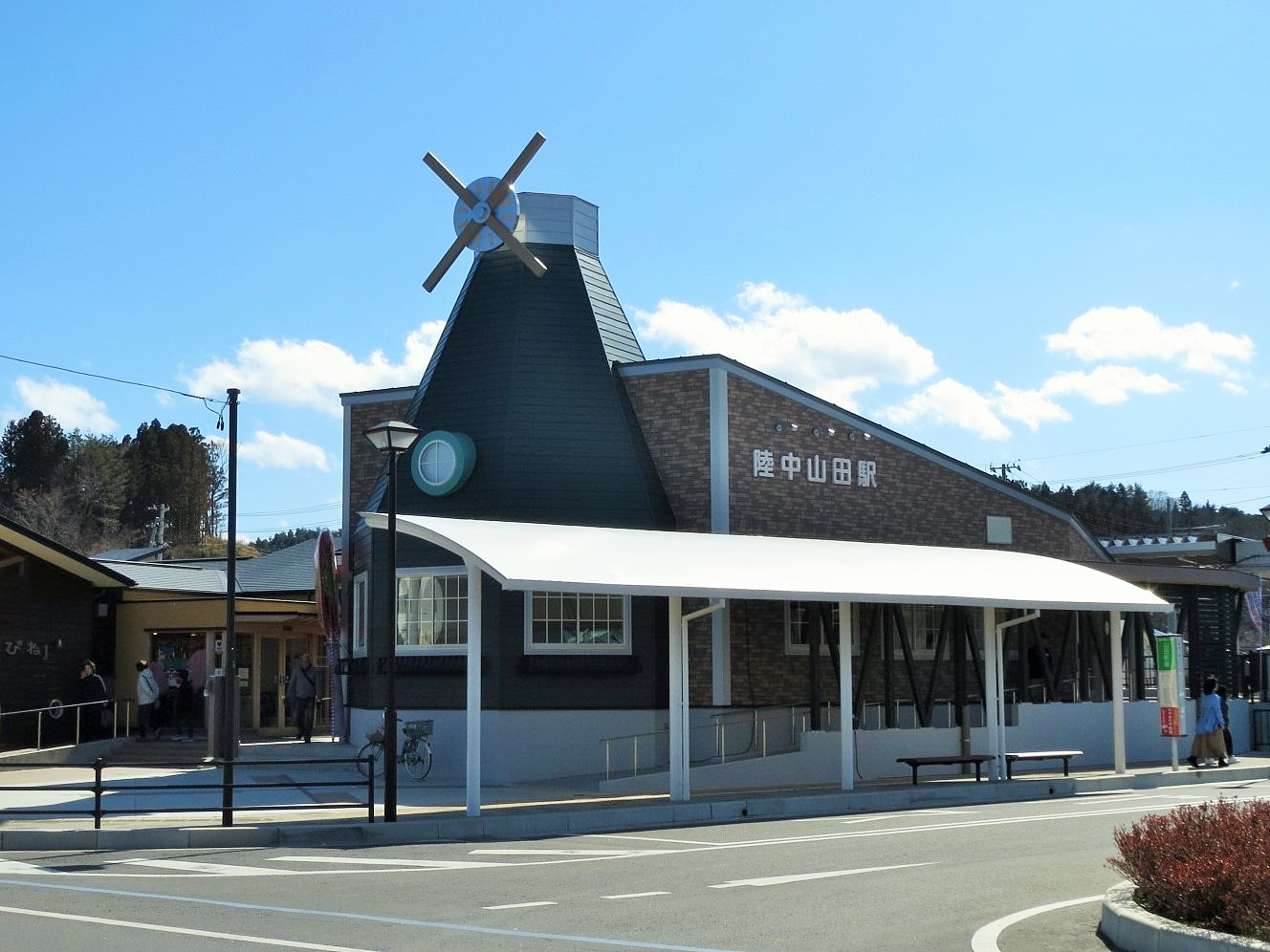
- Rikuchū-Yamada Station in March 2019

General information
- Location: Kawamukai-cho 8-13, Yamada, Shimohei, Iwate （岩手県下閉伊郡山田町川向町8-13） Japan
- Operator: Sanriku Railway
- Line: ■ Rias Line
- Distance: 65.5km from Sakari

History
- Opened: 1935

Passengers
- FY2012: 162 daily
Location

Rikuchū-Yamada Station (陸中山田駅, Rikuchū-Yamada-eki) is a Sanriku Railway Company station located in Yamada, Iwate Prefecture, Japan.

== Lines ==
Rikuchū-Yamada Station is served by the Rias Line, and was located 65.5 rail kilometers from the terminus of the line at Sakari Station. Formerly, it was served by the Yamada Line.

== Station layout ==
Rikuchū-Yamada Station had two opposed side platforms connected to the station building by an underground passage.

=== Platforms ===
1	■ Rias Line	for Miyako , and Kuji
2	■ Rias Line	for Kamaishi , and Sakari

== Adjacent stations ==
«	Service	»
Rias Line
Orikasa	-	Toyomane

== History ==
Rikuchū-Yamada Station opened on 17 November 1935. The station was absorbed into the JR East network upon the privatization of the Japan National Railways (JNR) on 1 April 1987. The station was destroyed in the fire which followed the 11 March 2011 Tōhoku earthquake and tsunami. As of 2018, the station have been rebuilt along with the rest of the closed segment of the Yamada Line. It was transferred to the Sanriku Railway upon completion on 23 March 2019. This segment joined up with the Kita-Rias Line on one side and the Minami-Rias Line on the other, which together constitutes the entire Rias Line. Accordingly, this station became an intermediate station of Rias Line.

== Surrounding area ==
- National Route 45
- Yamada Town Hall
- Yamada Post Office
- Yamada Port
