= Voices in the Wind (film) =

2020 film by Nobuhiro Suwa

- Film poster
- Directed by: Nobuhiro Suwa
- Written by: Nobuhiro Suwa; Kyôko Inukai
- Produced by: Eiji Izumi; Dai Miyazaki; Yoshiya Nagasawa
- Starring: Serena Motola; Nishijima Hidetoshi; Toshiyuki Nishida; Tomokazu Miura
- Cinematography: Takahiro Haibara
- Edited by: Takashi Sato
- Music by: Hiroko Sebu
- Distributed by: Broadmedia Studios
- Release date: 24 January 2020 (Japan)
- Running time: 139 minutes

Voices in the Wind (Japanese: 風の電話, Hepburn: Kaze no denwa; lit. Wind's Phone) is a 2020 drama film directed by Nobuhiro Suwa and co-written by Suwa and Kyoko Inukai. Suwa's first film based in Japan in eighteen years, it follows Haruka (acted by Serena Motola) on her impromptu road trip from Hiroshima to her hometown of Ōtsuchi eight years after the 2011 Tōhoku earthquake and tsunami took the lives of her parents and brother. The film is named after and involves the wind phone, a real installation in Ōtsuchi.

Distributed by Broadmedia Studios, the film was officially released in Japan on January 24, 2020. It was also screened at the 70th Berlin International Film Festival in Germany and won Special Mention for the Grand Prix of the Generation 14Plus International Jury for the Best Film category. It was Suwa's second film to be entered into the Generation 14Plus competition, his first being Yuki & Nina in 2009.

== Synopsis ==
At the age of nine, Haru lost her parents and brother, Hayato, to the 2011 Tōhoku earthquake and tsunami, which struck her family in Ōtsuchi. Since then, Haru has lived with her aunt, Hiroko, in Hiroshima. Eight years later, when Haru is seventeen and due to graduate from high school, Hiroko suggests going back to Ōtsuchi but falls ill and is hospitalized shortly after. Greatly affected by her aunt's ailment, Haru embarks on a journey from Hiroshima to Ōtsuchi all by herself, during which she is assisted and accompanied by several strangers and families along the way.

== Cast ==
- Serena Motola as Haruka
- Makiko Watanabe as Hiroko
- Hidetoshi Nishijima as Morio
- Toshiyuki Nishida as Imada
- Tomokazu Miura as Kohei

== Background ==
=== Wind phone ===
On a hill in Ōtsuchi, a garden designer named Itaru Sasaki built an unconnected white telephone booth, called the wind phone, in 2011 in order to enable him to "speak" with his deceased cousin who had passed in 2009. Sasaki had wanted to create something that would allow the living to somehow meet with the dead.

After the 2011 earthquake, Sasaki then allowed the public to use the phone in order to similarly "speak" with those who lost their lives in the disaster. Since then, over thirty thousand people have visited it in order to communicate with the deceased. In 2016, the NHK broadcast a documentary about the wind phone, and in 2017, Sasaki published a book regarding his decision to create it.

=== Inspiration ===
After the 2011 earthquake, Suwa, a television director at the time, felt emboldened to shoot footage of its aftermath and received permission from his studio to do so. However, his wife questioned the utility of his act, which made him question the ethics of his role and realize that it would be inappropriate to shoot footage of such a catastrophic event. In the end, he decided not to go. Years later, Suwa discovered the wind phone and decided to make a film about those who chose to seek it out.

While the film principally tackles the specific grief faced by the 2011 earthquake, it also mentions the Fukushima nuclear accident, the atomic bombings of Hiroshima and Nagasaki, and the plight of the Kurdish diaspora. Suwa and co-writer Kyoko Inukai decided to address these other historical incidences in their screenplay to address the diverse kinds of suffering felt by Japan and the rest of the world at the time.

== Production ==
During auditions, Motola was asked to first read a scene aloud with a script, after which she was asked to improvise with hardly any context other than setting. In preparing for her audition, Motola had found her sides so sad that she hesitated to audition, though she continued with it nonetheless. Upon landing the role, Motola felt a true desire to take on the role of Haru.

Like with some of his previous movies, Suwa directed the film without a script, still preferring improvisation both with regard to the acting performances as well as the handheld camera techniques employed for shooting. Many scenes, such as Haru and Morio's communion with the Kurdish people in Japan and the final conversation Haru has at the wind phone, were shot as though it were a documentary rather than a drama. Even then, Suwa felt that he had a strong grasp of the film's structure and that the character of Haru alone was enough to make a film out of. The final result was a film with minimal dialogue.

Shooting began in April 2019 with plans for release in spring of the following year. Early preview screenings were held at the end of 2019, including in Ōtsuchi. Following the film's completion and plans for distribution in January 2020, a crowdfunding campaign was organized in order to show it in more theaters nationwide, as well as parts of Japan which didn't have cinemas.

== Critical reception ==
After the film's completion, Suwa screened it for the locals in Ōtsuchi. Some stated that the film exceeded their expectations, while others found that it made them less lonely after suffering greatly from the disaster. Sasaki himself commented on the film as a way to convey one person's realization of the meaning of life through the wind phone.

The Reel Bits lauded Motola's "remarkably nuanced performance that is sure to put her on the top of casting lists" and its "rumination of grief" "beautifully captured" by Suwa's unflinching directing.

Asian Movie Pulse also admired Suwa as a "fearless filmmaker" and applauded Motola's acting: "[her] face is a canvas that presents the very core of the film. Her character is a carrier of the catastrophe. In the moments of encounter, she reminds others of the tsunami and the consequences. Past and present are collectively bound in her presence the same way the movie tries to keep up the memory of the disaster. Haru becomes a metaphor for the meaning of the film itself."
