= Yagisawa-Miyakotandai Station =

Railway station in Miyako, Iwate Prefecture, Japan

Yagisawa-Miyakotandai 八木沢・宮古短大駅
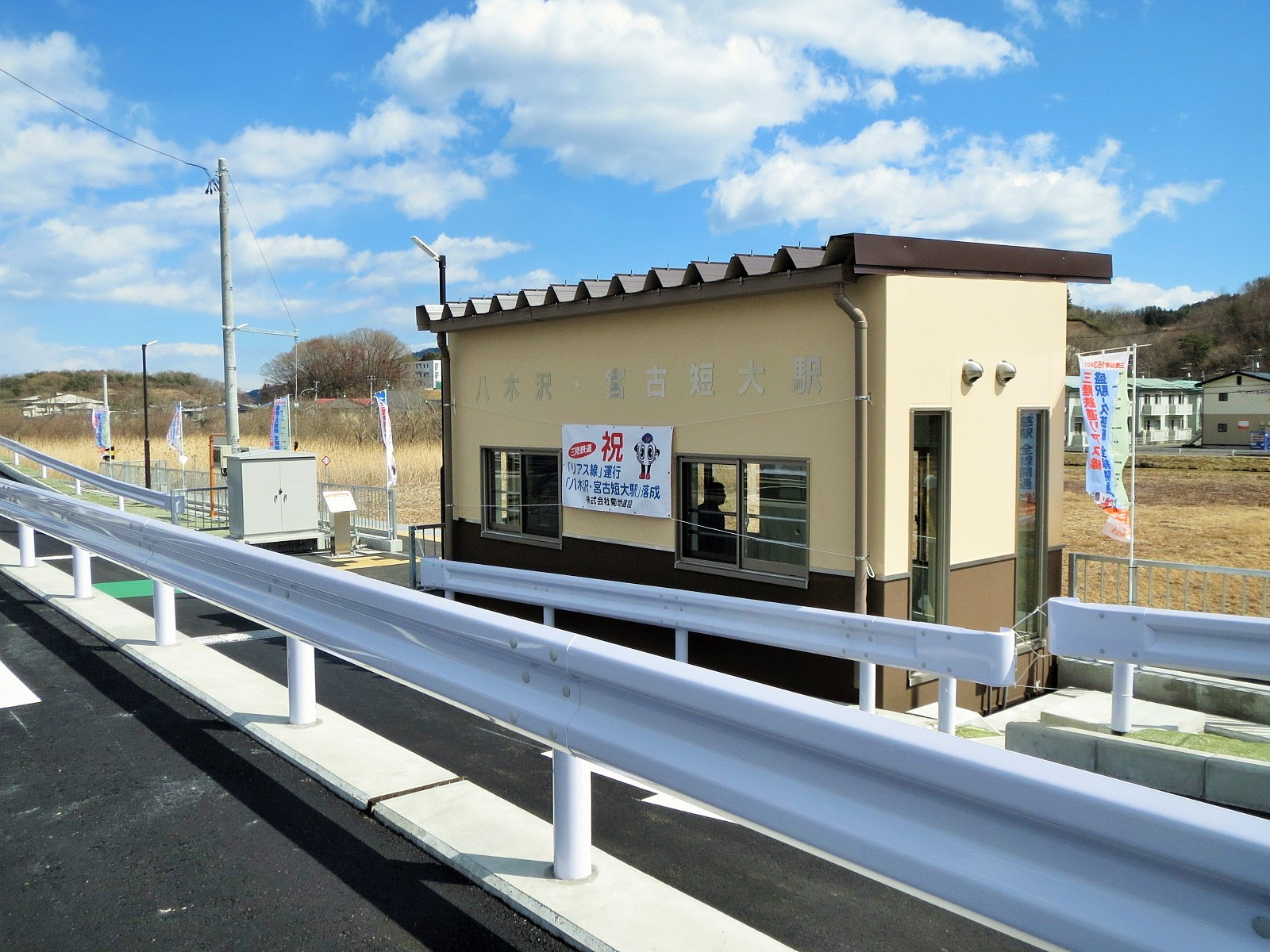
- Yagisawa-Miyakotandai Station in March 2019

General information
- Location: 1-3 Yagisawa Dai-1 jiwari, Miyako, Iwate （岩手県宮古市八木沢第一地割1番3） Japan
- Coordinates: 39°37′09″N 141°56′47″E
- Operator: Sanriku Railway
- Line: ■ Rias Line
- Distance: 88.2km from Sakari

History
- Opened: 23 March 2019
Location

Yagisawa-Miyakotandai Station (八木沢・宮古短大駅, Yagisawa-Miyako-Tandai-eki) is a railway station operated by Sanriku Railway Company located in Miyako, Iwate Prefecture, Japan.

== History ==
Yagisawa-Miyakotandai Station opened between Tsugaruishi Station and Sokei Station on 23 March 2019. This coincided with the completion of a reconstructed section of the Yamada Line between Miyako Station and Kamaishi Station, which was then transferred to Sanriku Railway's Rias Line.

== Adjacent stations ==
«	Service	»
Rias Line
Tsugaruishi	-	Sokei

== Surrounding area ==
- Iwate Prefectural University, Miyako College
