= Wind phone =

Telephone booth in Ōtsuchi, Japan

- 風の電話
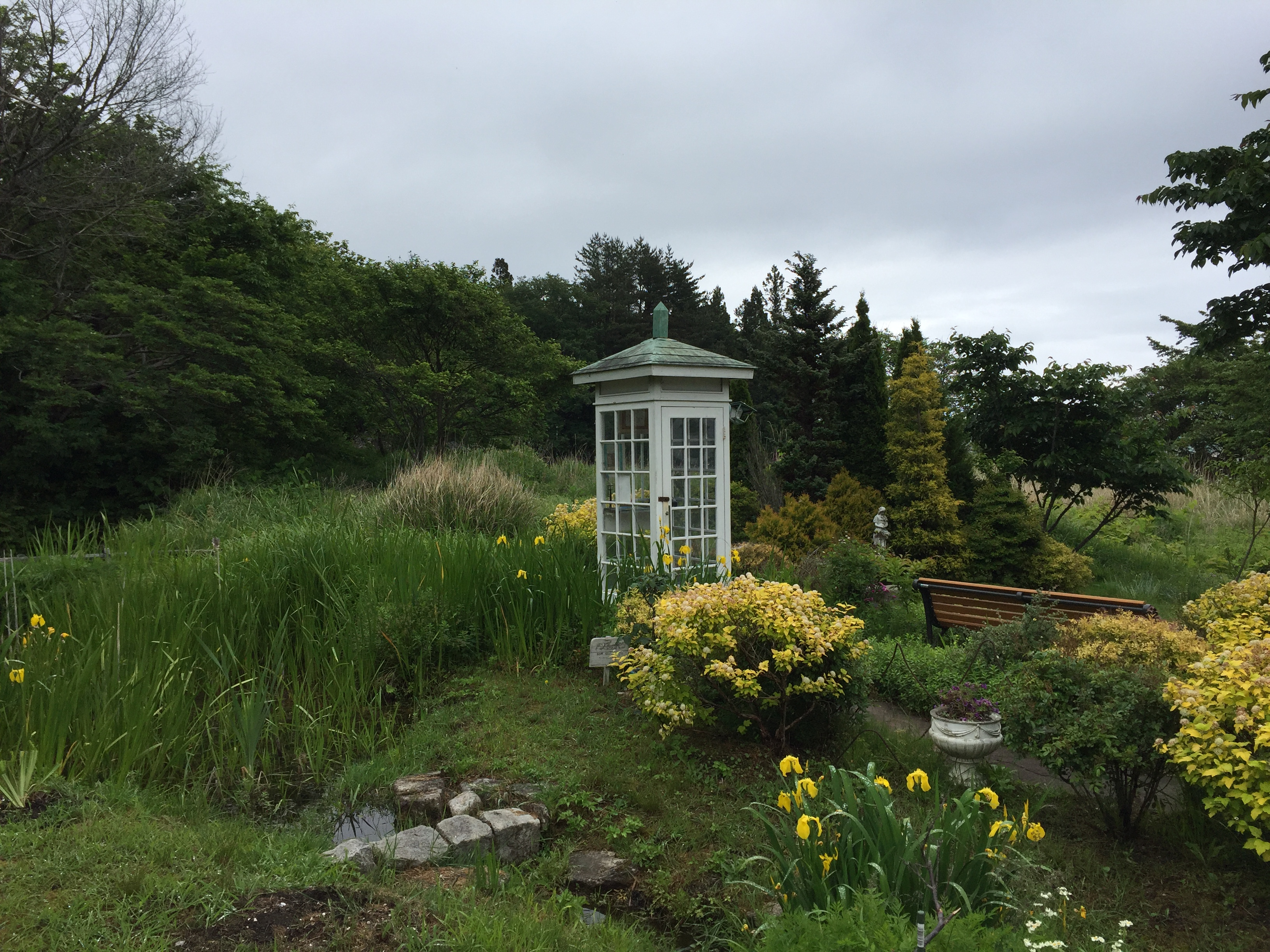
- Ōtsuchi wind phone in May 2018, before the inauguration of the newer aluminum booth

General information
- Type: Telephone booth
- Location: Ōtsuchi, Iwate Prefecture, Japan
- Coordinates: 39°23′10″N 141°55′55″E

The wind phone (風の電話, kaze no denwa) is an unconnected telephone booth in Ōtsuchi, Iwate Prefecture, Japan, where visitors can hold one-way conversations with deceased loved ones. Initially created by garden designer Itaru Sasaki in 2010 to help him cope with his cousin's death, it was opened to the public in the following year after the 2011 Tōhoku earthquake and tsunami killed over 15,000 people in the Tōhoku region. The wind phone has since received over 30,000 visitors. A number of replicas have been constructed around the world, and it has served as the inspiration for several novels and films.

== Origin and description ==
In 2010, Itaru Sasaki, a garden designer from Ōtsuchi, learned that his cousin had terminal cancer with three months to live. After his cousin's death, Sasaki set up an old telephone booth in his garden in December 2010, to continue to feel connected to him by "talking" to him on the phone. According to Sasaki, the wind phone was not designed with any specific religious connotation, but rather as a way to reflect on his loss. In an interview, he stated, "Because my thoughts couldn't be relayed over a regular phone line, I wanted them to be carried on the wind."

The wind phone is a white, glass-paned telephone booth containing a black, disconnected rotary dial telephone on a metal shelf. A notebook is placed next to the telephone for messages of remembrance. The booth is on a hill that overlooks Ōtsuchi.

== Public opening ==
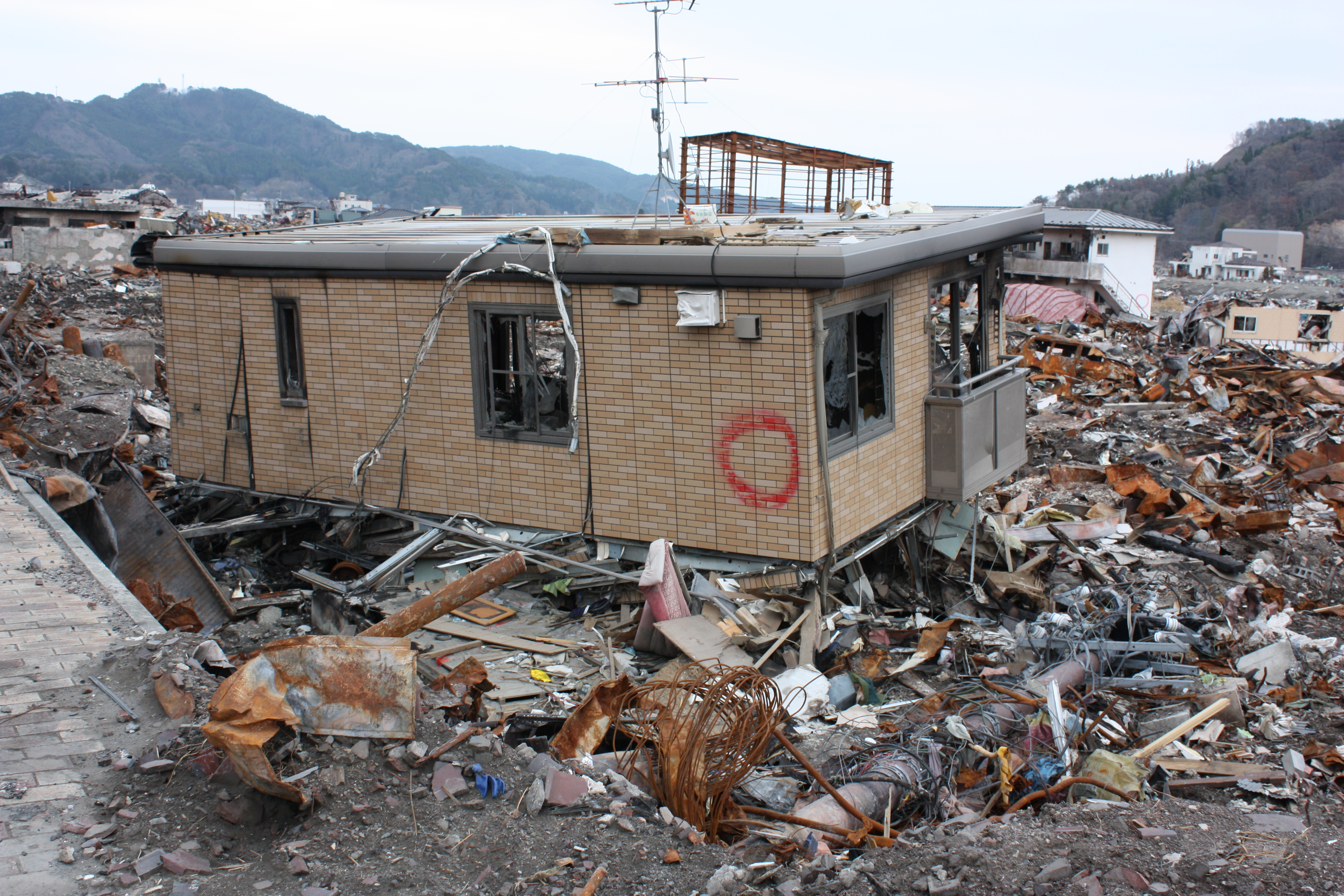
Damage to a building in Ōtsuchi, Iwate, following the 2011 tsunami

The 2011 Tōhoku earthquake resulted in the deaths of at least 19,759 people most especially in tsunamis in the Tōhoku region, including 1,407 people in Ōtsuchi (about 10 percent of the town's population). Sasaki subsequently opened the wind phone to the public to allow visitors to call their friends and family who had died in the disaster. It has since been visited by over 30,000 people.

On January 7, 2017, strong winds blew off the roof of the wind phone and broke the glass doors. Local carpenters, including ones who had previously visited the wind phone, quickly volunteered to repair it on January 10, and the wind phone was reopened by the next day. In April 2018, Sasaki announced that the wooden and metal parts of the booth were deteriorating due to age and corrosion, even after a new coat of paint, and that he hoped to replace the old booth with a corrosion-resistant aluminum booth. People responded with donations totaling about one million yen, and Sasaki installed the sturdier aluminum booth in August 2018.

== Replicas ==
Several replicas of the Ōtsuchi wind phone have been built around the world. In Oakland, California, local artist Jordan Stern constructed a wind telephone in February 2017, to commemorate the 36 people who died in the Ghost Ship warehouse fire, including his friend. According to Stern, the purpose of the wind phone was to comfort "a field of people grieving in Oakland".

Altrúchas, an anonymous art collective based in Dublin, Ireland, set up a wind phone (fón gaoithe) atop Two Rock Mountain in August 2017. The wind phone, which was constructed from salvaged materials, was installed without permission; at the time, Altrúchas stated that they planned on "maintaining it indefinitely". It was destroyed for unknown reasons less than two weeks after it was set up. In a statement, Altrúchas said that the destruction was "a strong statement from people that didn't like the project", but that they would not let it "take away from the positivity".

Tomohiko and Kazuko Kutsuna, a married couple in Tahara, Aichi Prefecture, Japan, installed a red-painted replica in 2018. Their telephone booth, named the "phone of the sea breeze" (潮風の電話, shiokaze no denwa), was built in memory of one of Kazuko's students, an 18-year-old woman who died by suicide in 2009.

Additional wind phones have been placed throughout the United States and Canada.

As of August 2025, there are 8 wind phones in the Netherlands, with plans to build more.

As of December 2025, there is one at the Waldfriedhof in Bad Homburg Germany.

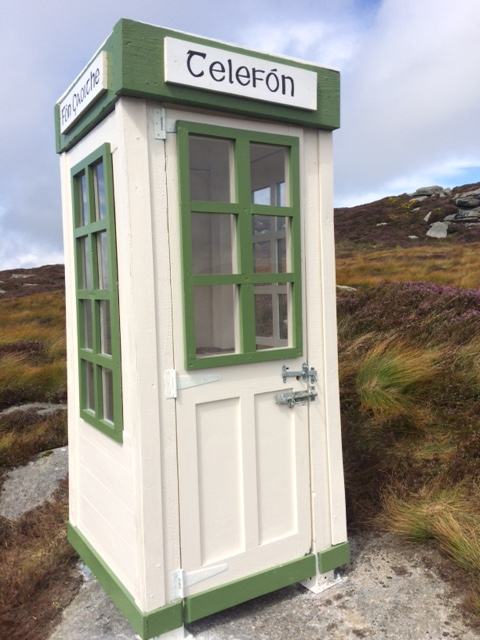
Wind phone on Two Rock, Ireland, in 2017

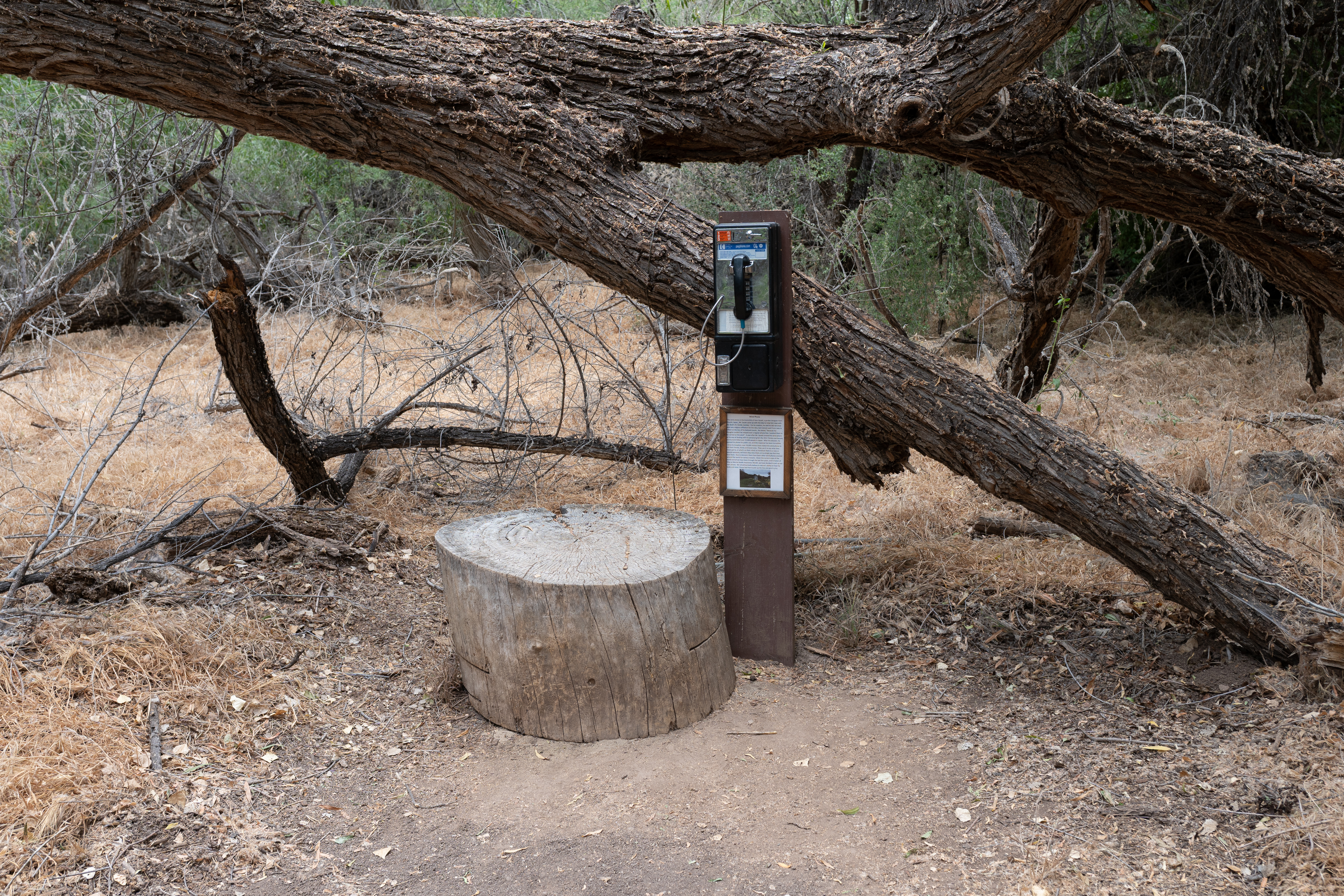
A Wind Phone at Hassayampa River Preserve near Wickenburg, Arizona

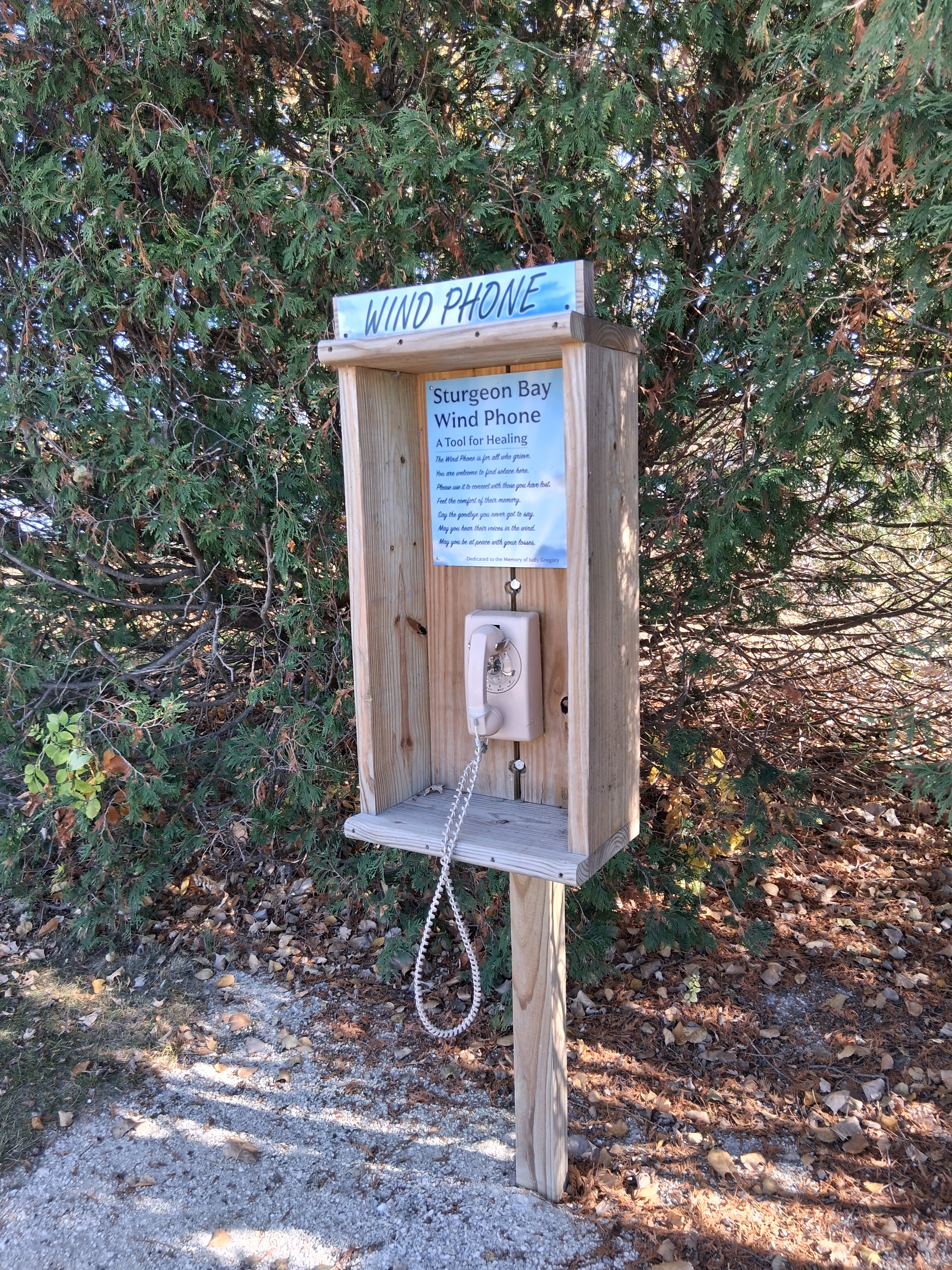
A memorial Wind Phone along a mile long walking trail in Sturgeon Bay, Wisconsin

== In media ==
=== Literature ===
Sasaki, the creator of the Ōtsuchi wind phone, wrote a book of reflections titled Kaze no Denwa – Daishinsai Kara Rokunen, Kaze no Denwa o Tooshite Mieru Koto (風の電話: 大震災から6年、風の電話を通して見えること; lit. 'The Phone of the Wind: What I Have Seen via the Phone in the Six Years Since the Earthquake') in 2017. The book was published by Kazama Shobo.

The 2020 novel The Phone Box at the Edge of the World by Italian writer Laura Imai Messina tells the story of a woman who loses her family in the Tōhoku tsunami and travels to the wind phone, where she meets a widower and his daughter who have experienced similar losses. The novel was inspired by Messina's visit to the Ōtsuchi wind phone in 2011.

The Phone Booth in Mr. Hirota's Garden, a 2020 novel by Canadian writer Heather Smith, is a fictionalized version of the wind phone's origins. According to Smith, she was inspired by a National Public Radio podcast about the wind phone and exchanged emails with Sasaki during the writing process, stating that it "was a thrill to receive his blessing and an honour to share his beautiful approach to grief through this book."

=== Film ===
The 2019 Austrian short film The Wind Phone, written and directed by Kristin Gerweck, follows seven fictional strangers who visit the Japanese wind phone. Gerweck wrote the screenplay when she learned about the wind phone after her grandmother's death, saying: "I was intrigued by the emotional realities that could emerge in this metaphysical grieving space and so began my journey to translate this beautiful story to screen."

Voices in the Wind (風の電話, Kaze no Denwa) is a 2020 Japanese drama film about a fictional high school student who lost her family in the Tōhoku tsunami and returns to her hometown to visit the wind phone years later. Director Nobuhiro Suwa, who returned to Japan for filming, stated: "Going there eight years later, you can't see much of the damage, it has been rebuilt. But people's feelings have not been fixed."
