= E46 =

E46 may refer to:

- BMW 3 Series (E46)
- European route E46
- Kamaishi Expressway and Akita Expressway (between Kitakami JCT and Kawabe JCT), route E46 in Japan
