= Yamada, Iwate =

Yamada 山田町
- Town
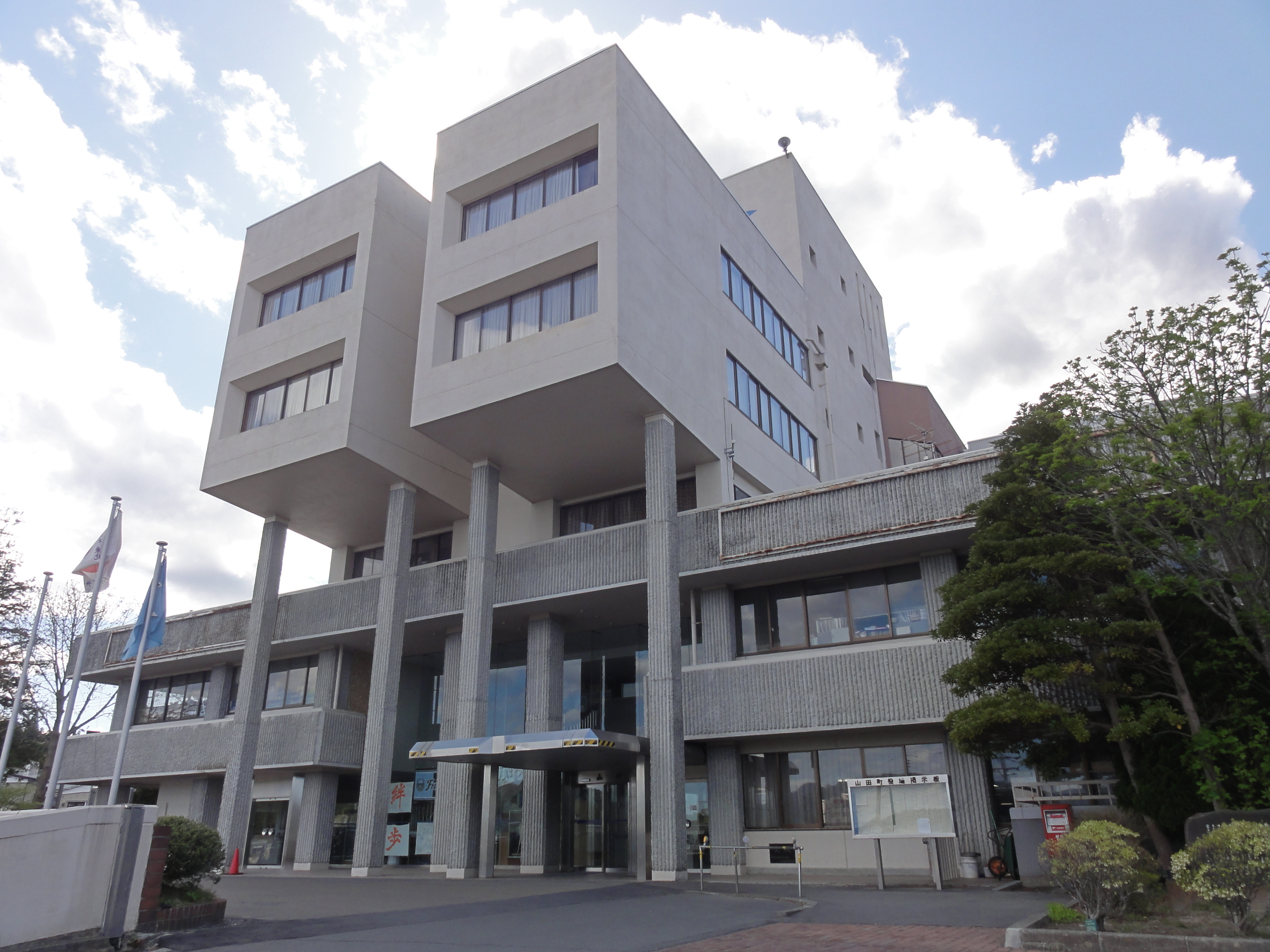
- Yamada Town Hall

- Flag Seal

- Location of Yamada in Iwate Prefecture

- Coordinates: 39°28′3.2″N 141°56′56.1″E
- Country: Japan
- Region: Tōhoku
- Prefecture: Iwate
- District: Shimohei

Area
  - Total: 262.81 km^{2} (101.47 sq mi)

Population (October 10, 2020)
  - Total: 14,320
  - Density: 54.49/km^{2} (141.1/sq mi)
- Time zone: UTC+9 (Japan Standard Time)
- Phone number: 0193-82-3111
- Address: 3-20 Hachiman-cho, Yamada-machi, Shimohei-gun, Iwate-ken 028-1392
- Climate: Cfa
- Website: Official website
- Symbols
- Bird: Black-tailed gull
- Flower: Hamanasu
- Tree: Sugi

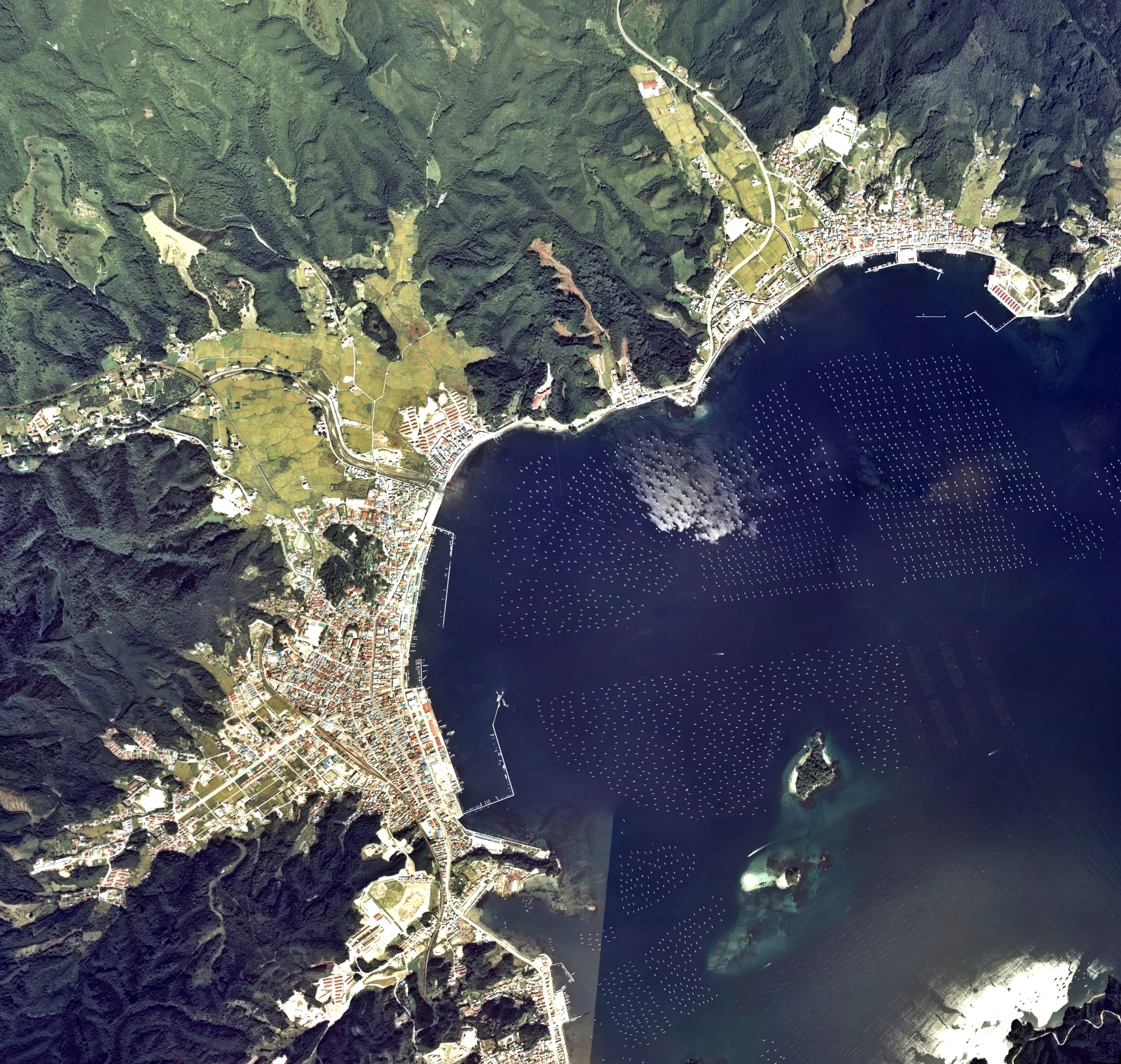
Yamada and Yamada Bay in 1977

Yamada (山田町, Yamada-machi) is a town in Iwate Prefecture, Japan. As of 1 May 2020, the town had an estimated population of 15,195 and a population density of 58 persons per km^{2}, in 6,554 households. The total area of the town is 262.81 square kilometres (101.47 sq mi).

== Geography ==
Yamada is located on the ria coastline of central Iwate Prefecture, facing the Pacific Ocean on the northern part of Funakoshi Bay and Yamada Bay. The Sekiguchi River and Ogasa River empty into Yamada Bay, and Yamada Port is located slightly south of the mouth of the Sekiguchi River, with train stations, government offices, hospitals, etc. concentrated in this vicinity. Parts of the town are within the borders of the Sanriku Fukkō National Park.

=== Neighbouring municipalities ===
Iwate Prefecture

- Miyako
- Ōtsuchi

=== Climate ===
Yamada has an oceanic climate (Köppen Cfb) characterized by mild summers and cold winters. The average annual temperature in Yamada is 9.2 °C. The average annual rainfall is 1415 mm with September as the wettest month and February as the driest month. The temperatures are highest on average in August, at around 21.6 °C, and lowest in January, at around -1.8 °C.

Climate data for Yamada, Iwate (1991−2020 normals, extremes 1976−present)
Month	Jan	Feb	Mar	Apr	May	Jun	Jul	Aug	Sep	Oct	Nov	Dec	Year
Record high °C (°F)	16.4 (61.5)	20.7 (69.3)	23.9 (75.0)	32.7 (90.9)	32.2 (90.0)	34.7 (94.5)	37.5 (99.5)	37.2 (99.0)	36.5 (97.7)	29.9 (85.8)	22.9 (73.2)	24.6 (76.3)	37.5 (99.5)
Mean daily maximum °C (°F)	5.9 (42.6)	6.3 (43.3)	9.5 (49.1)	14.8 (58.6)	19.0 (66.2)	21.6 (70.9)	25.0 (77.0)	26.8 (80.2)	24.0 (75.2)	19.4 (66.9)	14.3 (57.7)	8.6 (47.5)	16.3 (61.3)
Daily mean °C (°F)	0.5 (32.9)	0.8 (33.4)	3.7 (38.7)	8.7 (47.7)	13.4 (56.1)	16.9 (62.4)	20.8 (69.4)	22.4 (72.3)	19.3 (66.7)	13.7 (56.7)	8.0 (46.4)	2.9 (37.2)	10.9 (51.7)
Mean daily minimum °C (°F)	−4.1 (24.6)	−4.2 (24.4)	−1.6 (29.1)	2.8 (37.0)	8.2 (46.8)	13.0 (55.4)	17.6 (63.7)	19.0 (66.2)	15.3 (59.5)	8.7 (47.7)	2.4 (36.3)	−1.9 (28.6)	6.3 (43.3)
Record low °C (°F)	−14.8 (5.4)	−16.7 (1.9)	−11.4 (11.5)	−6.2 (20.8)	−1.7 (28.9)	1.7 (35.1)	8.1 (46.6)	8.9 (48.0)	4.3 (39.7)	−2.5 (27.5)	−6.3 (20.7)	−13.5 (7.7)	−16.7 (1.9)
Average precipitation mm (inches)	64.8 (2.55)	54.2 (2.13)	102.7 (4.04)	109.5 (4.31)	133.5 (5.26)	150.3 (5.92)	174.0 (6.85)	182.7 (7.19)	221.8 (8.73)	182.3 (7.18)	75.2 (2.96)	69.9 (2.75)	1,527.1 (60.12)
Average precipitation days (≥ 1.0 mm)	4.8	5.6	8.2	8.6	9.6	10.5	12.6	11.3	12.2	9.1	6.6	5.3	104.4
Mean monthly sunshine hours	174.3	162.2	187.2	199.7	206.5	172.5	153.6	170.6	139.6	152.0	157.6	156.9	2,030.4
Source: JMA

== Demographics ==
Per Japanese census data, the population of Yamada has declined over the past 60 years.

Historical population
Year	Pop.	±%
1920	13,714	—
1930	16,224	+18.3%
1940	18,166	+12.0%
1950	23,679	+30.3%
1960	24,966	+5.4%
1970	24,193	−3.1%
1980	25,321	+4.7%
1990	22,925	−9.5%
2000	21,214	−7.5%
2010	18,625	−12.2%
2020	14,320	−23.1%

== History ==
The area of present-day Yamada was part of ancient Mutsu Province, with many Jomon period and Kofun period remains. In the Heian period it was dominated by the Abe clan and the Northern Fujiwara. It was dominated by the Nanbu clan from the Kamakura period. It was part of Morioka Domain under the Tokugawa shogunate during the Edo period. Yamada was the location of the 1643 Breskens Incident, where the Dutch ship Breskens, part of the De Vries expedition, made two unauthorised visits to Yamada and was captured by Japanese authorities.

With the Meiji period establishment of the modern municipalities system, the town of Yamada was created within Higashihei District on April 1, 1889. Higashihei District was merged into Minamihei District on March 29, 1896. On March 1, 1955, Yamada annexed the neighboring villages of Funakoshi, Orikada, Osawa and Toyomane to reach is present borders.

After the March 2011 Tōhoku earthquake, it was reported that the town had been almost completely submerged by the ensuing tsunami.

== Government ==
Yamada has a mayor-council form of government with a directly elected mayor and a unicameral town council of 14 members. Yamada, together with the city of Miyako, town of Iwaizumi and the villages of Fudai and Tanohata, collectively contributes three seats to the Iwate Prefectural legislature. In terms of national politics, the town is part of Iwate 2nd district of the lower house of the Diet of Japan.

== Economy ==
The local economy is strongly based on commercial fishing, including aquaculture using the ria coast, as well as tourism. Small and medium sized factories operate mainly in mountainous areas. In the early 20th century, it was a noted whaling port.

== Education ==
Yamada has nine public elementary schools and two public junior high schools operated by the town government, and one public high school operated by the Iwate Prefectural Board of Education.

=== Museums ===
A Whales and Science of the Sea Museum operates in Yamada. It was established in 1992 in response to preserve the history of commercial whaling following Japan's withdrawal from the practice. The museum contains one of the world's largest sperm whale skeleton specimens, as well as various other whale skeleton specimens and other exhibits on marine life and the ocean.

== Transportation ==
=== Railway ===
Sanriku Railway – Rias Line

- Toyomane - Rikuchū-Yamada - Orikasa - Iwate-Funakoshi

=== Highway ===
- Sanriku Expressway
- National Route 45

== International relations ==
- Zeist, the Netherlands, friendship city since May 13, 2000

== Notable people from Yamada ==
- Zenkō Suzuki, former Prime Minister
