= Serena Motola =

Japanese model, actress, and singer (born 1998)

- モトーラ世理奈
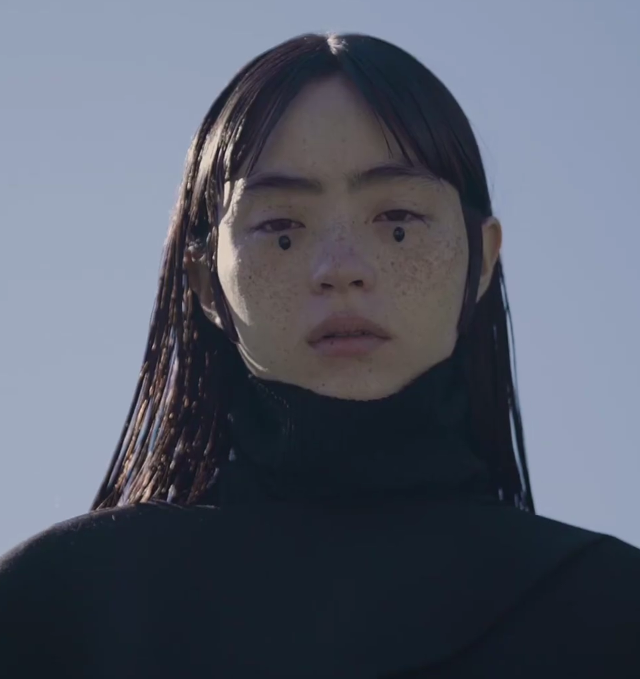
- Motola for DEW Magazine in November 2020
- Born: October 9, 1998 (age 27); Tokyo, Japan
- Education: Bunka Fashion College
- Occupations: Model; actress; singer
- Years active: 2014–present
- Modeling information
- Height: 167 cm (5 ft 5 1/2 in)
- Hair color: Dark brown
- Eye color: Brown
- Agency: Box Corporation

Serena Motola (モトーラ世理奈, Motola Serena; born October 9, 1998) is a Japanese fashion model, actress and singer. She signed with Box Corporation at age 16, and made her runway debut at the Amazon Fashion Week Tokyo F/W 2017 show. She is best known for being the face of Soen since 2017.

Motola landed her first feature film role in the coming-of-age drama Girls' Encounter (2018). She received critical acclaim in 2020 for her lead role in the drama film Voices in the Wind, for which she won the Kinema Junpo Award for Best New Actress, and was nominated for several other accolades.

== Early life and education ==
Serena Motola was born on October 9, 1998 in Tokyo, Japan and is an only child. Her father is an American national of Italian descent, and her mother is Japanese. Her parents met in the United States, where her mother was working as a Japanese language teacher at the time before moving to Tokyo together. As a child, Motola trained in hip-hop dance, all throughout elementary school and high school. After graduating from high school, Motola enrolled at Bunka Fashion College to study fashion marketing and distribution. She dropped out after her second year to focus on her modelling career.

== Filmography ==
Year	Title	Role	Notes	Ref.
2017	Girls' Encounter	Tsumugi		
2019	21st Century Girl		Segment: "Out of Fashion"	
2019	Black School Rules	Kio Machida		
2020	Voices in the Wind	Haruka Sakura		
2020	Tokyo Design Story	Mutsumi Ono		
2022	Gudetama: An Eggcellent Adventure	Assistant Director Suzuki		
2022	Japanese Style	Ichiko Kuno		
2023	Ice Cream Fever	Saho Hashimoto		

== Awards and nominations ==
Award	Year	Category	Nominated work	Result	Ref.
Japan Film Critics Awards	2020	Best New Actress	My Father, the Bride and Black School Rules	Won	
Nikkan Sports Film Awards	2020	Rookie of the Year	Voices in the Wind	Nominated	
Mainichi Film Awards	2021	Sponichi Grand Prix Rookie of the Year	Voices in the Wind	Nominated	
Kinema Junpo Awards	2021	Best New Actress	Voices in the Wind	Won	
