= Miyamori, Iwate =

Miyamori 宮守村
- Former municipality
- Flag Emblem

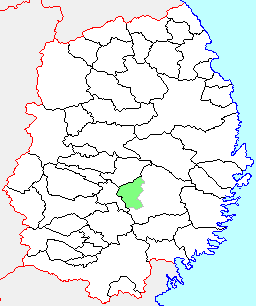
- Location of Miyamori in Iwate Prefecture

- Location in Japan
- Coordinates: 39°20′39.6″N 141°21′23.4″E
- Country: Japan
- Region: Tōhoku
- Prefecture: Iwate Prefecture
- District: Kamihei District
- Merged: October 1, 2005 (now part of Tōno)

Area
  - Total: 165.24 km^{2} (63.80 sq mi)

Population (September 30, 2005)
  - Total: 5,126
  - Density: 31/km^{2} (80/sq mi)
- Time zone: UTC+09:00 (JST)
- Symbols
- Bird: Japanese bush warbler
- Flower: Lilium auratum
- Tree: Pinus densiflora

Miyamori (宮守村, Miyamori-mura) was a village located in Kamihei District, Iwate Prefecture, Japan.

== History ==
The village of Miyamori was created on April 1, 1889 within Nishihei District with the establishment of the municipalities system. Nishihei was merged with Minamihei District to form Kamihei District on March 29, 1896. On February 11, 1955, Miyamori annexed the neighboring villages of Tassobe and Masuzawa.

On October 1, 2005, Miyamori was merged into the expanded city of Tōno and no longer exists as an independent municipality.

On September 30, 2005, the village had an estimated population of 5,162 and a population density of 31.0 persons per km^{2}. The total area was 165.24 km^{2}.
