= Ōtsuchi, Iwate =

Ōtsuchi 大槌町
- Town
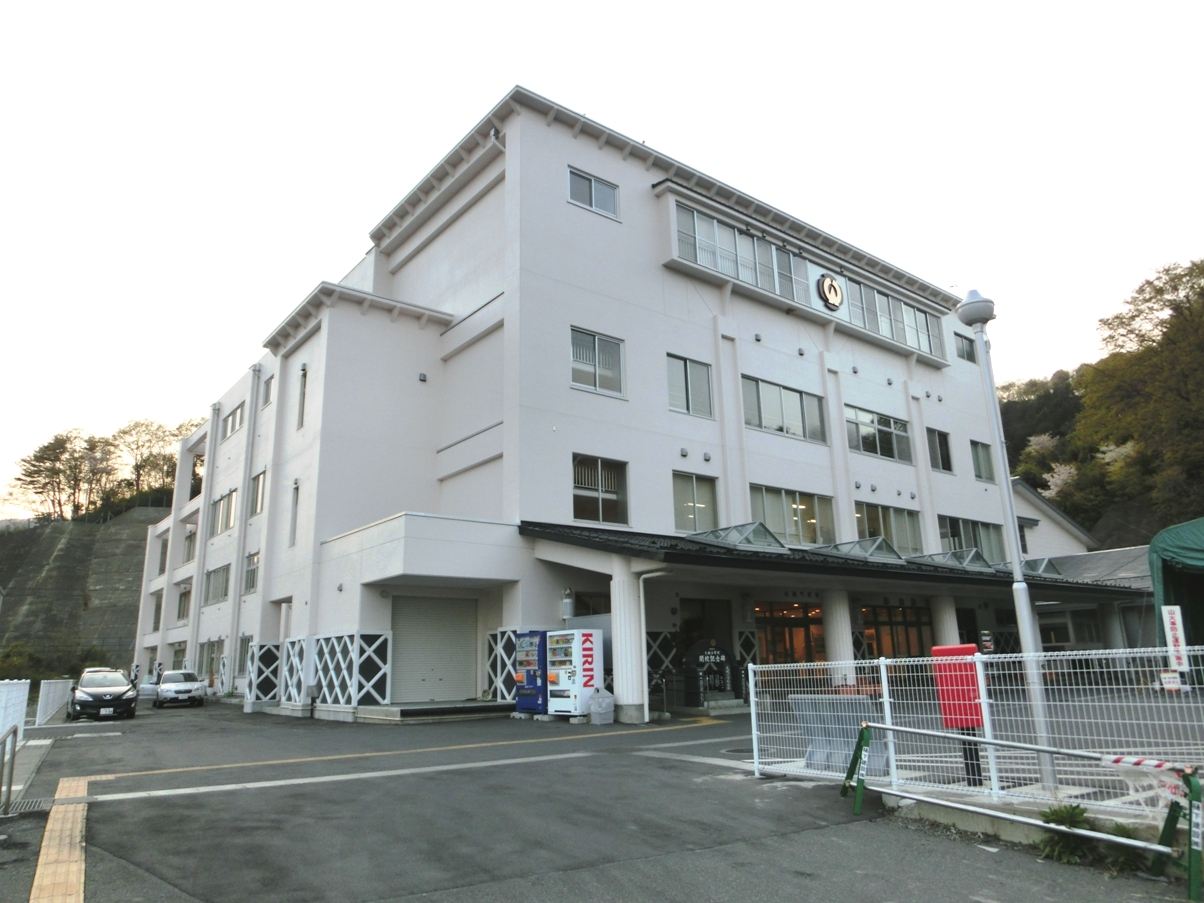
- New Ōtsuchi Town Hall, June 2013

- Flag Emblem
- Interactive map outlining Ōtsuchi
- Location of Ōtsuchi in Iwate Prefecture

- Location of Ōtsuchi in Japan
- Coordinates: 39°21′29.7″N 141°53′58″E
- Country: Japan
- Region: Tōhoku
- Prefecture: Iwate
- District: Kamihei

Area
  - Total: 200.42 km^{2} (77.38 sq mi)

Population (October 10, 2020)
  - Total: 11,004
  - Density: 54.905/km^{2} (142.20/sq mi)
- Time zone: UTC+9 (Japan Standard Time)
- City symbols
  - Tree: Keyaki
  - Flower: Rhododendron
  - Bird: Common gull
  - Fish: Chum salmon
- Phone number: 0193-42-2111
- Address: 1–3 Uemachi Ōtsuchi-chō, Kamihei-gun, Iwate 028-1192
- Website: Official website

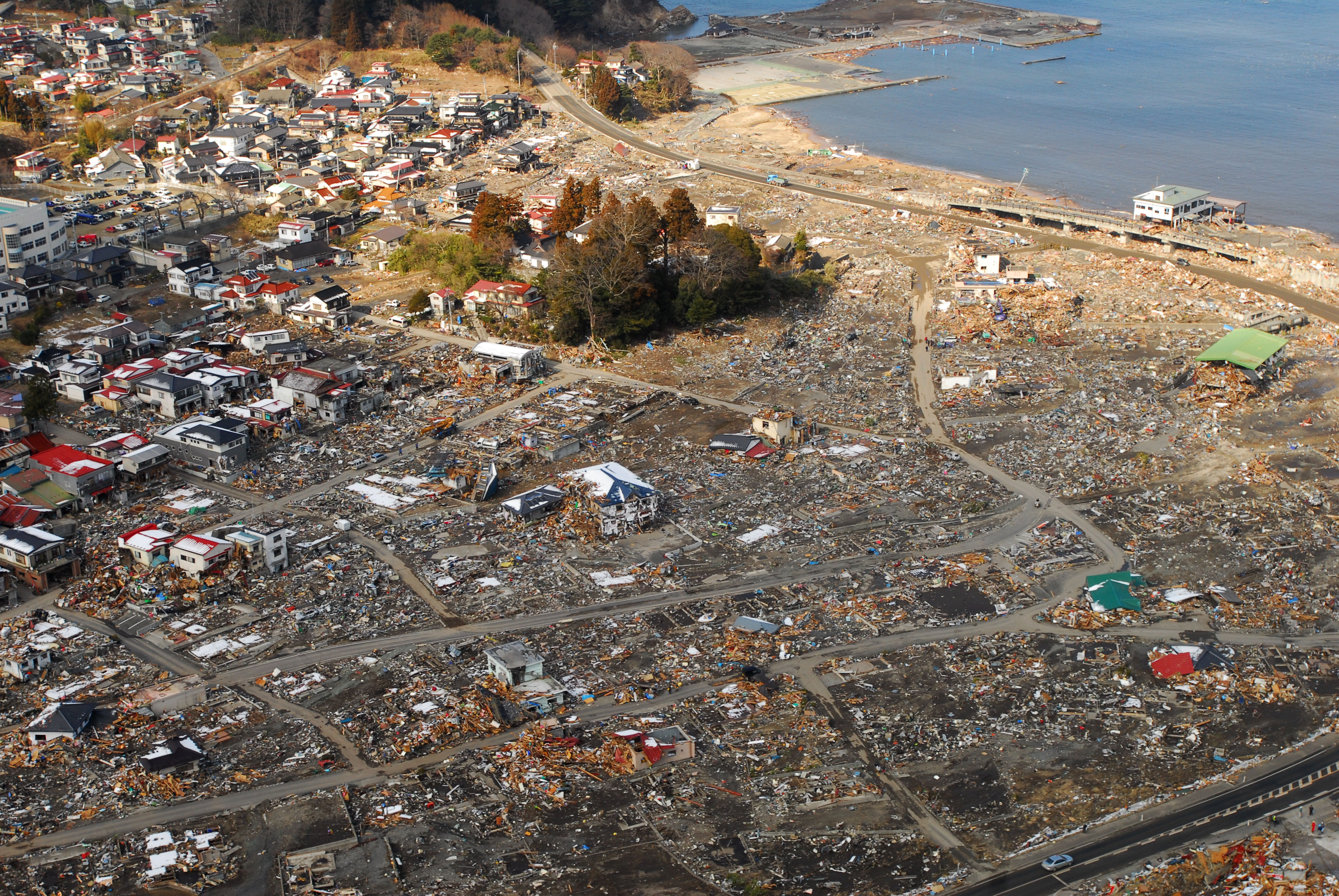
Aerial view of damage to Kirikiri, Ōtsuchi, a week after a 9.0 magnitude earthquake and subsequent tsunami. When viewed from above, the contrast between the largely-destroyed lower area and intact areas of the town on higher ground is fully visible.

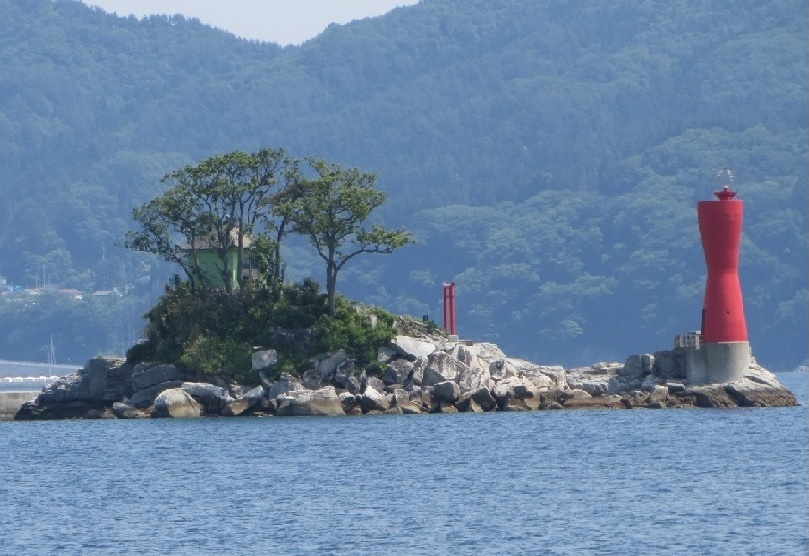
Ōtsuchi port

Ōtsuchi (大槌町, Ōtsuchi-chō) is a town located in Kamihei District, Iwate Prefecture, in the Tōhoku region of northern Japan. As of 1 March 2020, the town had an estimated population of 11,572 and a population density of 58 persons per km^{2} in 5308 households. The total area of the town is 200.42 square kilometres (77.38 sq mi).

Since 1973, the University of Tokyo has maintained a marine research laboratory in Ōtsuchi. It is called the International Coastal Research Center (ICRC) and is managed by the Atmosphere and Ocean Research Institute.

== Geography ==
Ōtsuchi is a coastal mountainous community situated on the Sanriku Coast along the Pacific Ocean. The inland portion of the town is within the Kitakami Mountains.

=== Neighboring municipalities ===
Iwate Prefecture

- Kamaishi
- Miyako
- Tōno
- Yamada

=== Climate ===
Ōtsuchi has a humid subtropical climate (Köppen Cfa) characterized by mild summers and cold winters. The average annual temperature in Ōtsuchi is 11.2 °C. The average annual rainfall is 1402 mm with September as the wettest month and February as the driest month. The temperatures are highest on average in August, at around 23.5 °C, and lowest in January, at around 0.4 °C.

== Demographics ==
Per Japanese census data, the population of Ōtsuchi has declined over the past 40 years.

Historical population
Year	Pop.	±%
1920	10,617	—
1930	12,638	+19.0%
1940	13,906	+10.0%
1950	18,012	+29.5%
1960	20,004	+11.1%
1970	20,489	+2.4%
1980	21,292	+3.9%
1990	19,074	−10.4%
2000	17,480	−8.4%
2010	15,277	−12.6%
2020	11,004	−28.0%

== History ==
The area of present-day Ōtsuchi was part of ancient Mutsu Province, dominated by the Nambu clan from the Muromachi period. It was part of Morioka Domain under the Edo period Tokugawa shogunate. The town of Ōtsuchi was created within Kamihei District with the Meiji period establishment of the modern municipality system on April 1, 1889. The town expanded by annexation of the neighboring village of Kanazawa on April 1, 1955.

=== 2011 Tōhoku earthquake and tsunami ===
On March 11, 2011, the town was devastated by a 9.1 magnitude earthquake and tsunami. The tsunami obliterated the harbor and low-lying areas, while higher parts of the town were spared, though they did suffer damage from the earthquake and the many aftershocks. About half the city was inundated by the tsunami. The tsunami destroyed all but 30 of 650 fishing boats and completely wiped out the town's sea farm industry.

City firemen manually closed the 12 water gates in the port's tsunami wall, but the wall was unable to hold back the waves. Eight city firemen were dead or missing. As of 31 August 2011, 799 residents of the town were confirmed dead, with 608 others still missing, about 10% of the town's total population of 16,000.

The University of Tokyo's ICRC sustained extensive damage during the tsunami with water reaching the laboratories on the third floor.

Town mayor Koki Kato was last seen at a safety meeting with city officials on Friday. His body was recovered on Saturday, 19 March 2011.

In the aftermath of the tsunami, local resident Itaru Sasaki opened a wind phone, a telephone booth in which visitors could hold one-way conversations with deceased loved ones. Over 30,000 people have visited the wind phone since 2011.

== Government ==
Ōtsuchi has a mayor-council form of government with a directly elected mayor and a unicameral city legislature of 14 members. Ōtsuchi, and the city of Kamaishi collectively contribute two seats to the Iwate Prefectural legislature. In terms of national politics, the city is part of Iwate 2nd district of the lower house of the Diet of Japan.

== Economy ==
The local economy is based on commercial fishing and to a lesser extent on agriculture.

== Education ==
Ōtsuchi has one public elementary school and one public junior high school operated by the town government, and one public high school operated by the Iwate Prefectural Board of Education.

== Transportation ==
=== Railway ===
Sanriku Railway – Rias Line

- Namiitakaigan – Kirikiri – Ōtsuchi

=== Highway ===
- Sanriku Expressway
- National Route 45

== International relations ==
- Fort Bragg, California, United States

As a youth Ken Sasaki noted that his home of Ōtsuchi is located on the same latitude as Fort Bragg, California and in 2001 he contacted then Mayor Lindy Peters and visited with a delegation to open discussions on a sister city agreement. Fort Bragg students visited Ōtsuchi in 2002 and the sister-city proclamation was solidified in 2005 by subsequent Mayor, Dave Turner. Other student exchanges were held in 2004, 2006, 2008 and 2010 and the next exchange was planned for July 2011. Following the 2011 Tōhoku earthquake and tsunami devastation Mayor Turner ordered that city flags be flown half staff until the end of March to honour the thousands of lives lost.
