= Kamihei District, Iwate =

District in Iwate prefecture, Japan

Coordinates: 39°48′37″N 141°07′22″E

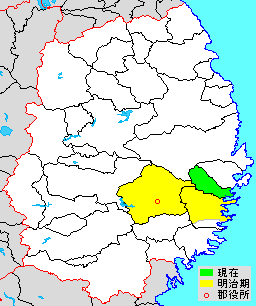
Map showing original extent of Kamihei District in Iwate Prefecture colored area=original extent in Meiji period; green=present area

Kamihei District (上閉伊郡, Kamihei-gun) is a rural district in Iwate Prefecture, Japan.

From 2005, the district consists only of the town of Ōtsuchi, which as of June 1, 2019 had an estimated population of 11,106 with a density of 55.4 per km^{2} and an area of 200.42 km^{2}. The entire city of Tōno, and all of the city of Kamaishi with the exception of the village of Tōni were formerly part of Kamihei District.

== Towns and villages ==
The district consists of one town:

- Ōtsuchi

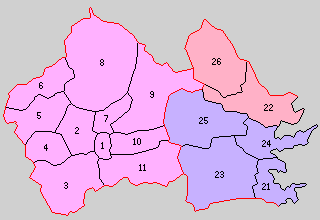
Historic Map of Kamihei District: Pink= Tōno City (1. Tōno; 2. Ayaori; 3. Otomo; 4. Masuzawa; 5. Miyamori; 6. Tassobe; 7. Matsuzaki; 8. Tsukimoushi; 9. Tsuchibuchi; 10. Aozasa: 11. Kamigō) Blue=Kamaishi City (21. Kamaishi; 23. Kashi; 24. Unosumai; 25. Kurihashi) Orange=Ōtsuchi Town (22. Ōtsuchi; 26. Kanazawa)

== History ==
=== Under Mutsu Province ===
Hei District was one of the Edo period districts of Mutsu Province under the Tokugawa shogunate and was completely under the control of Nanbu clan of Morioka Domain. Following the Meiji restoration, on January 4, 1879 Hei District came under Rikuchū Province and was divided into four parts.

With the establishment of the municipality system, Nishihei District was organized with one town (Tōno) and 10 villages, and Minamihei District consisted of two towns (Kamaishi and Ōtsuchi) and four villages.

=== Subsequent timeline ===
- April 1, 1897 – Nishihei and Minamihei Districts merged to form Kamihei District (3 towns, 14 villages)
- May 5, 1937 - The town of Kamaishi was elevated to town status. (2 towns, 14 villages)
- December 1, 1954 - The villages of Ayaori, Otomo, Matsuzaki, Tsukimoushi, Tsuchibuchi, Aozasa, and Kamigō merged into the city of Tono. (1 towns, 7 villages)
- February 11, 1955 - The villages of Miyamori, Masuzawa and Tassobe merged to form the village of Miyamori. (1 town, 5 villages)
- April 1, 1955 - The villages of Unosumai, Kurihashi and Kashi, and the village of Tōni from Kesen District were merged with Kamaishi. (1 town, 2 villages)
- April 1, 1955 - The village of Kanazawa merged with Ōtsuchi. (1 town, 1 village)
- October 1, 2005 - The village of Miyamori merged into the expanded city of Tōno. (1 town)
