= A45 =

A45 or A-45 may refer to:

== Roads ==
- A45 road, a road connecting Birmingham and Thrapston in England
- Autovía A-45, a road connecting Malaga and Cordoba in Spain
- Bundesautobahn 45, a road connecting Dortmund and Aschaffenburg in Germany
- A45 autoroute, a proposed motorway connecting Lyon and Saint-Étienne in France

== Other uses ==
- A45 Infantry Support Tank, the chassis of which was developed into the Conqueror tank
- A45 Records, a German record label notably producing the band Real McCoy
- Article 45 Concern Group, a political party in Hong Kong
- Indian Defence, Encyclopaedia of Chess Openings code
- A45 AMG, a performance compact car produced by Mercedes-Benz
- Sisu A-45, a Finnish military truck
