= List of highways numbered 45 =

The following highways are numbered 45:

== International ==
- AH45 Asian Highway 45
- E45 European route E45

== Burma ==
- National Road 45 (Burma)

== Canada ==
- Alberta Highway 45
- Manitoba Highway 45
- Ontario Highway 45
- Saskatchewan Highway 45

== China ==
- G45 Expressway
- Asian Highway 45A

== Dominican Republic ==
- DR-45 (known locally as the International Highway) straddling the border with Haiti

== Finland ==
- Finnish national road 45

== France ==
- A45 autoroute (proposed)

== Germany ==
- Bundesautobahn 45

== India ==
- National Highway 45 (India) (Grand Southern Trunk Road)

== Iran ==
- Road 45

== Japan ==
- Japan National Route 45

== Korea, South ==
- Jungbu Naeryuk Expressway
- National Route 45

== Mexico ==
- Mexican Federal Highway 45

== New Zealand ==
- New Zealand State Highway 45

== United Kingdom ==
- British A45 (Birmingham-Thrapston)
- British M45 (Watford Gap-Thurlaston)

== United States ==
- Interstate 45
- U.S. Route 45
  - U.S. Route 45E
  - U.S. Route 45W
- Alabama State Route 45
  - County Route 45 (Lee County, Alabama)
- Arkansas Highway 45
- California State Route 45
- Colorado State Highway 45
- Connecticut Route 45
- Florida State Road 45
  - Florida State Road 45A
- Georgia State Route 45
  - Georgia State Route 45 (former)
- Idaho State Highway 45
- Illinois Route 45 (former)
- Indiana State Road 45
- Iowa Highway 45 (former)
- K-45 (Kansas highway) (former)
- Louisiana Highway 45
- Maryland Route 45
  - Maryland Route 45A
  - Maryland Route 45B
  - Maryland Route 45C
  - Maryland Route 45D
  - Maryland Route 45E
- Massachusetts Route 45 (former)
- M-45 (Michigan highway)
- Minnesota State Highway 45
- Missouri Route 45
- Nebraska Highway 45
  - Nebraska Link 45B
  - Nebraska Spur 45A
- Nevada State Route 45 (former)
- New Hampshire Route 45
- New Jersey Route 45
  - County Route 45 (Monmouth County, New Jersey)
- New Mexico State Road 45
- New York State Route 45
  - County Route 45 (Cattaraugus County, New York)
  - County Route 45A (Cayuga County, New York)
    - County Route 45B (Cayuga County, New York)
  - County Route 45 (Erie County, New York)
  - County Route 45 (Genesee County, New York)
  - County Route 45 (Greene County, New York)
  - County Route 45 (Herkimer County, New York)
  - County Route 45 (Jefferson County, New York)
  - County Route 45 (Niagara County, New York)
  - County Route 45 (Oswego County, New York)
  - County Route 45 (Otsego County, New York)
  - County Route 45 (Putnam County, New York)
  - County Route 45 (Rensselaer County, New York)
  - County Route 45 (Saratoga County, New York)
  - County Route 45 (St. Lawrence County, New York)
  - County Route 45 (Steuben County, New York)
  - County Route 45 (Suffolk County, New York)
  - County Route 45 (Sullivan County, New York)
    - County Route 45A (Sullivan County, New York)
  - County Route 45 (Ulster County, New York)
  - County Route 45 (Washington County, New York)
- North Carolina Highway 45
- North Dakota Highway 45
- Ohio State Route 45
- Oklahoma State Highway 45
- Pennsylvania Route 45
- South Carolina Highway 45
- South Dakota Highway 45
- Tennessee State Route 45
- Texas State Highway 45
  - Texas State Highway Spur 45
  - Farm to Market Road 45
  - Texas Park Road 45
- Utah State Route 45
- Virginia State Route 45
- West Virginia Route 45
- Wisconsin Highway 45 (former)

== See also ==
- A45 (disambiguation)#Roads

Preceded by 44	Lists of highways 45	Succeeded by 46
