= Hachimantai =

Hachimantai may refer to:

Places:

- Hachimantai, Iwate, a city in Iwate prefecture, Japan
- Mount Hachimantai, a mountain in northern Japan
- Hachimantai Station, a railway station in the city of Hachimantai
- Towada-Hachimantai National Park, a Japanese national park
