= Matsukawa Geothermal Power Plant =

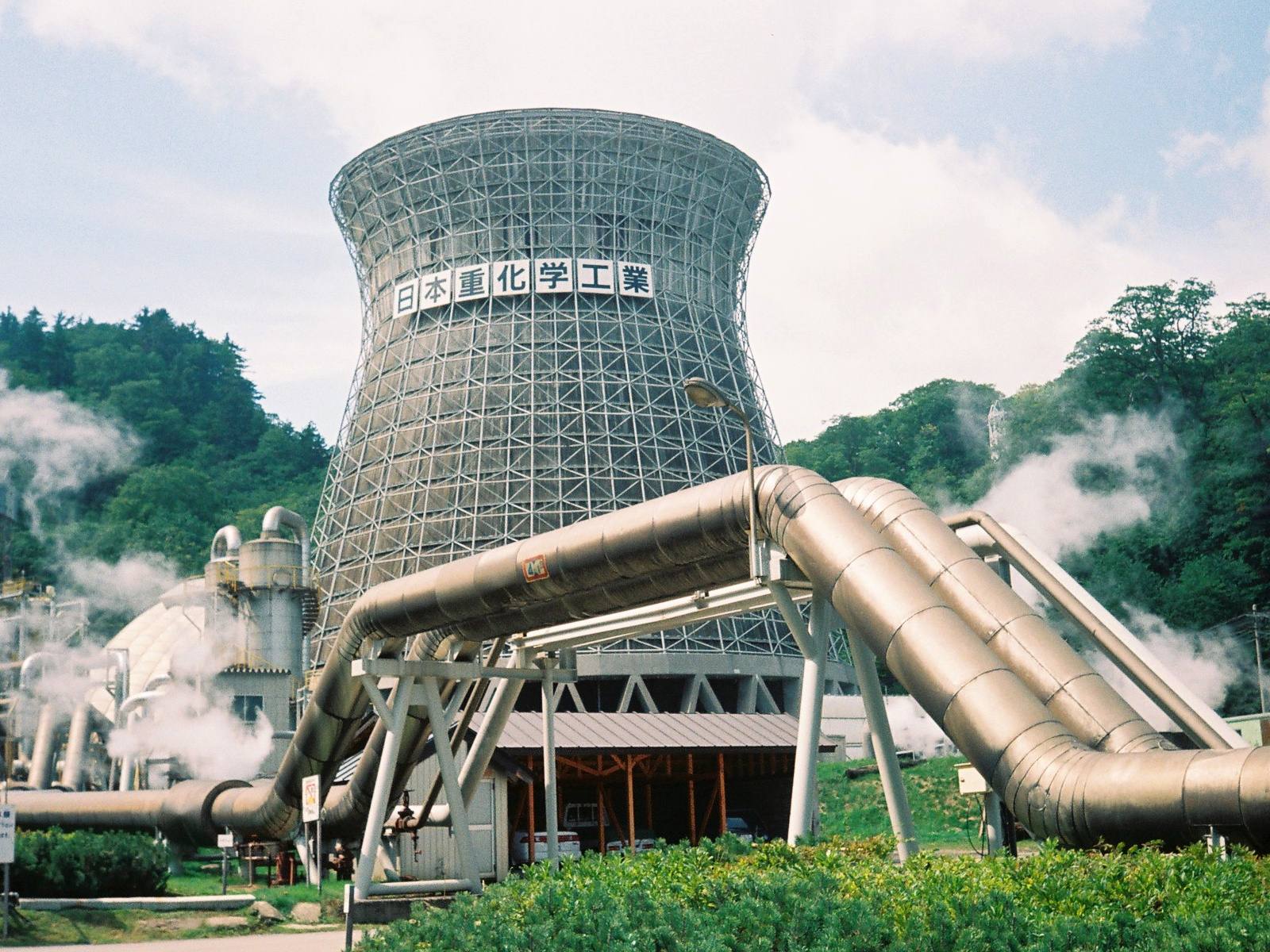
- Official name: 松川地熱発電所
- Country: Japan
- Location: Hachimantai, Iwate
- Coordinates: 39°52′19″N 140°55′14″E
- Status: Operational
- Commission date: 1966
- Operator: Tohoku Electric Power Company

Geothermal power station
- Type: Dry steam, low pressure reaction

Power generation
- Nameplate capacity: 23.5 MW

The Matsukawa Geothermal Power Plant (松川地熱発電所, Matsukawa Jinetsu Hatsudensho) is Japan's first commercial geothermal power station. It is located in the city of Hachimantai, Iwate Prefecture in the Tōhoku region of northern Japan.

The plant is located in the Hachimantai Plateau, in the Ōu Mountains. After seams of steam were found at the Matsuo mine in 1952, plans began to utilize this resource for the generation of electric power. The plant was completed in 1966 with a total construction cost of 2 billion yen by Japan Metals & Chemicals Co., Ltd. was operated by the same company. After a corporate reorganization, the plant was turned over to Tohoku Geothermal Energy Company, a subsidiary of Tohoku Electric.

In addition to power generation, the waste hot water is supplied to farmers with greenhouses for agricultural applications.

In 2016, the Matsukawa Georthermal Plant was certified as one of the Mechanical Engineering Heritage sites of Japan by the Japan Society of Mechanical Engineers (JSME). As it marked its fiftieth year, the plant was also cited as an inspiration for new power sources following the Fukushima Daiichi nuclear disaster.

The plant comprises one generation unit with a capacity of 23.5 MW.

== See also ==
- Geothermal power in Japan
