= Appi Kogen Ski Resort =

Ski resort in Japan

Coordinates: 40.002°N 140.970°E

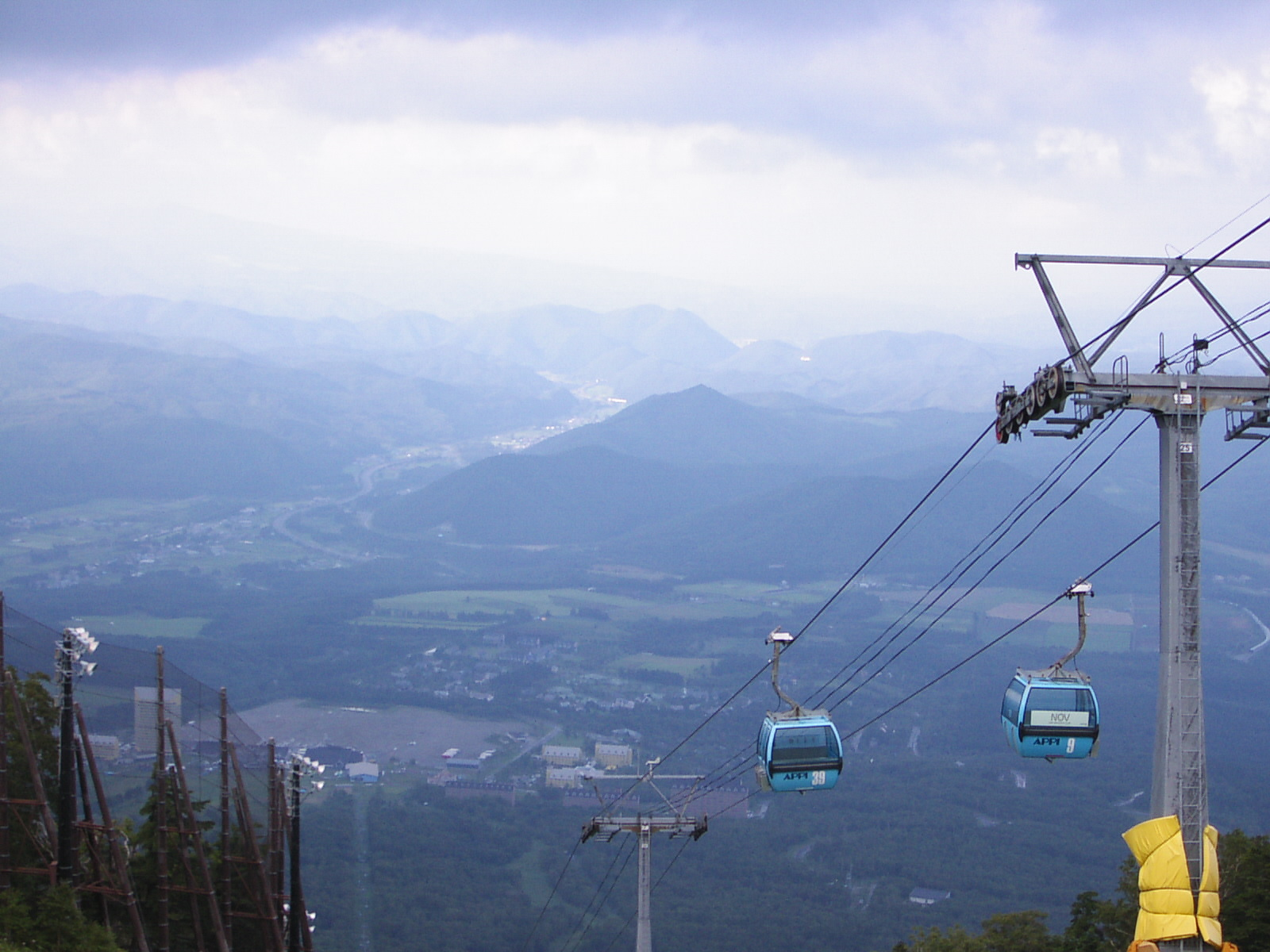
- A view from top of Mt. Maemori
- Interactive map of Appi Kogen Ski Resort
- Location: Hachimantai, Iwate, Japan
- Vertical: 828 m (2,717 ft)
- Top elevation: 1,328 m (4,357 ft)
- Base elevation: 500 m (1,640 ft)
- Skiable area: 282 ha (697 acres)
- Trails: 21; 30% easiest 40% more difficult 30% most difficult
- Longest run: 5.5 km (3.4 mi)
- Lift system: 16 (2 gondola lifts, 3 high-speed quad chairlifts, and 11 pair chairlifts)
- Lift capacity: 28,000/hr
- Terrain parks: 2
- Snowfall: 1,200 cm (470 in)
- Snowmaking: Yes
- Night skiing: 4pm-8pm (December–March)
- Website: Appi Resort

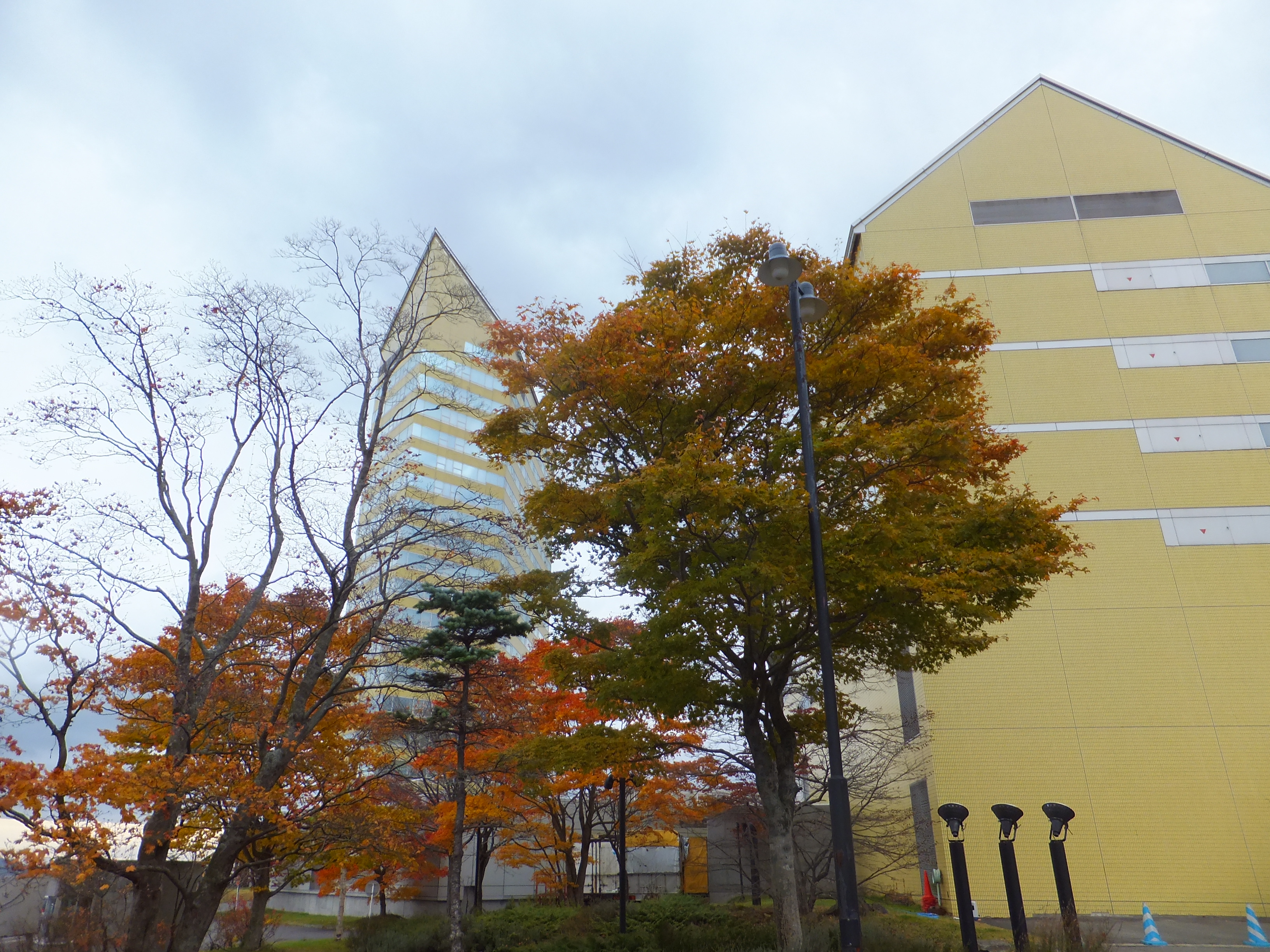
Hotel Appi Grand main building (right) and tower (left)

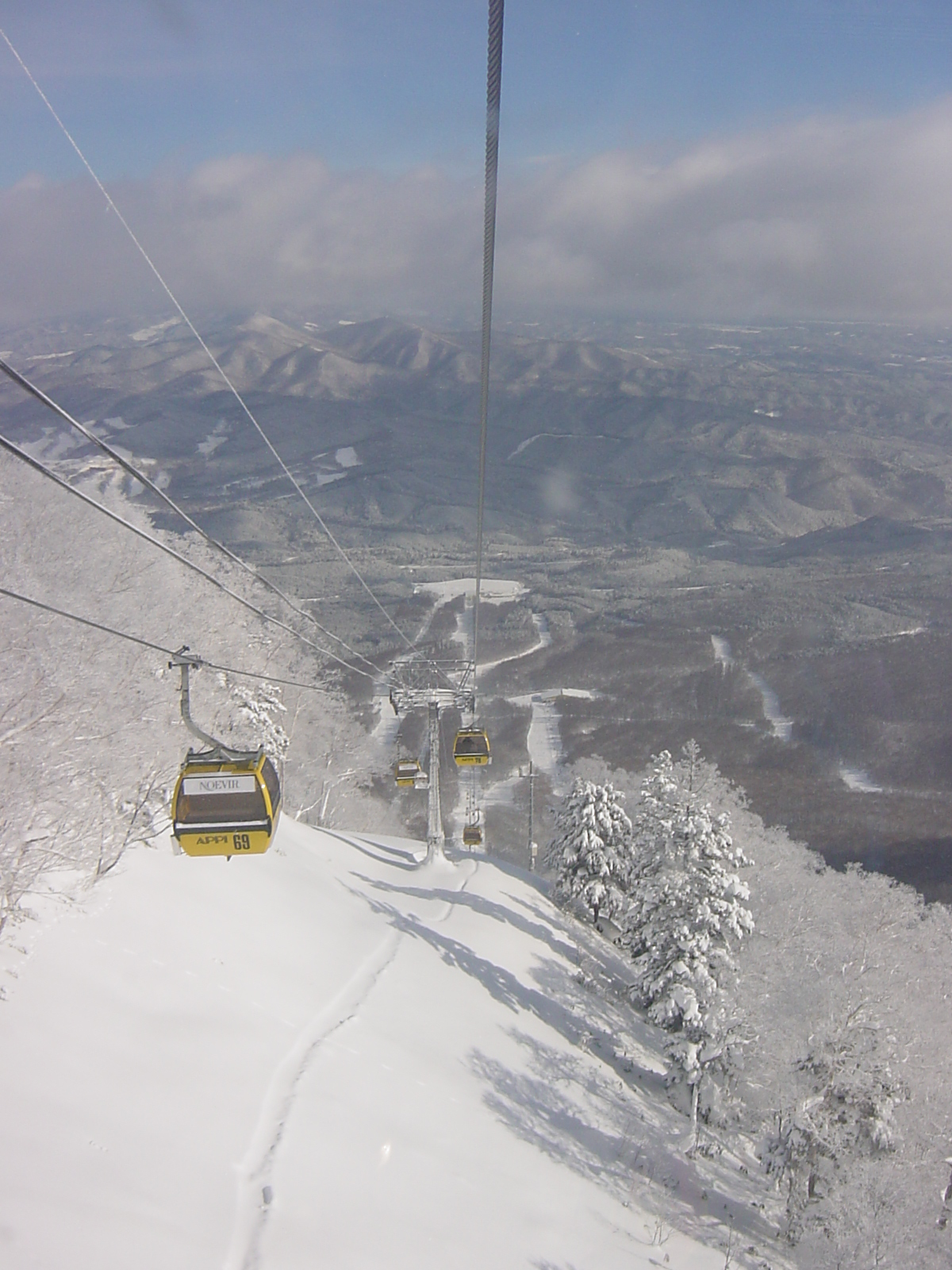
A view from Sailer Gondola

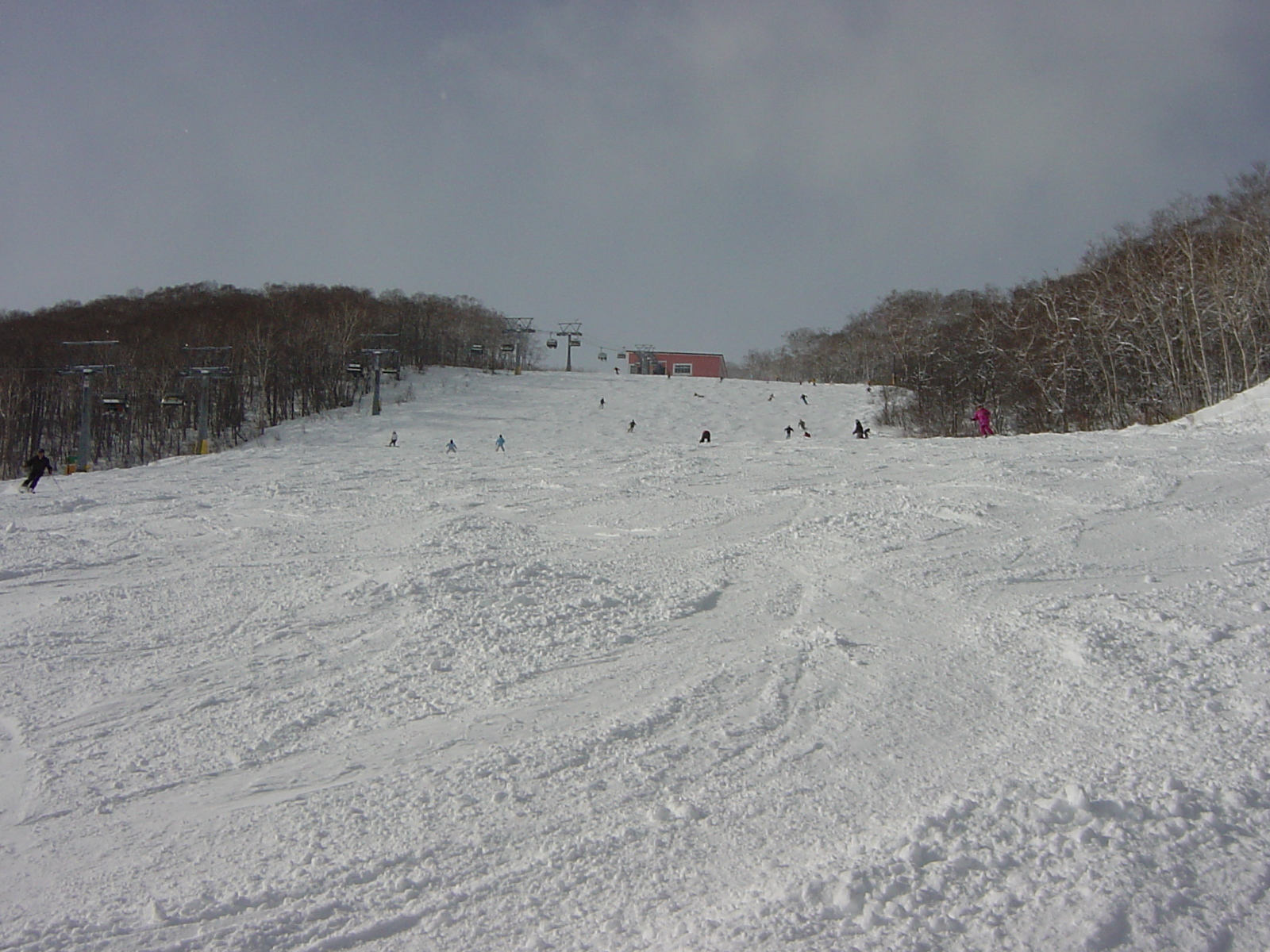
Upper Second Slopes First Run and Vista Quad

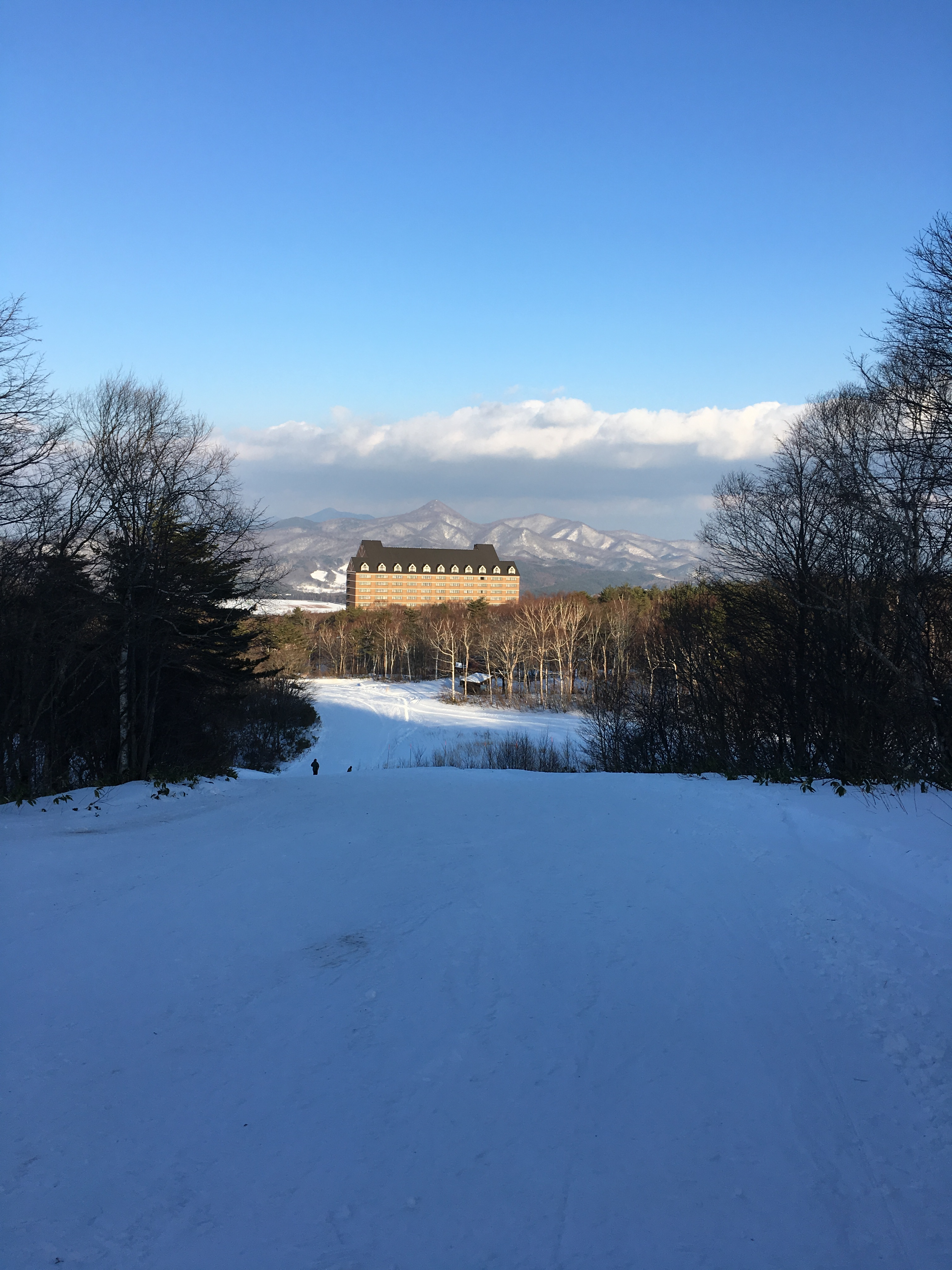
Karugamo Run and Appi Hills Shirakaba-No-Mori 3

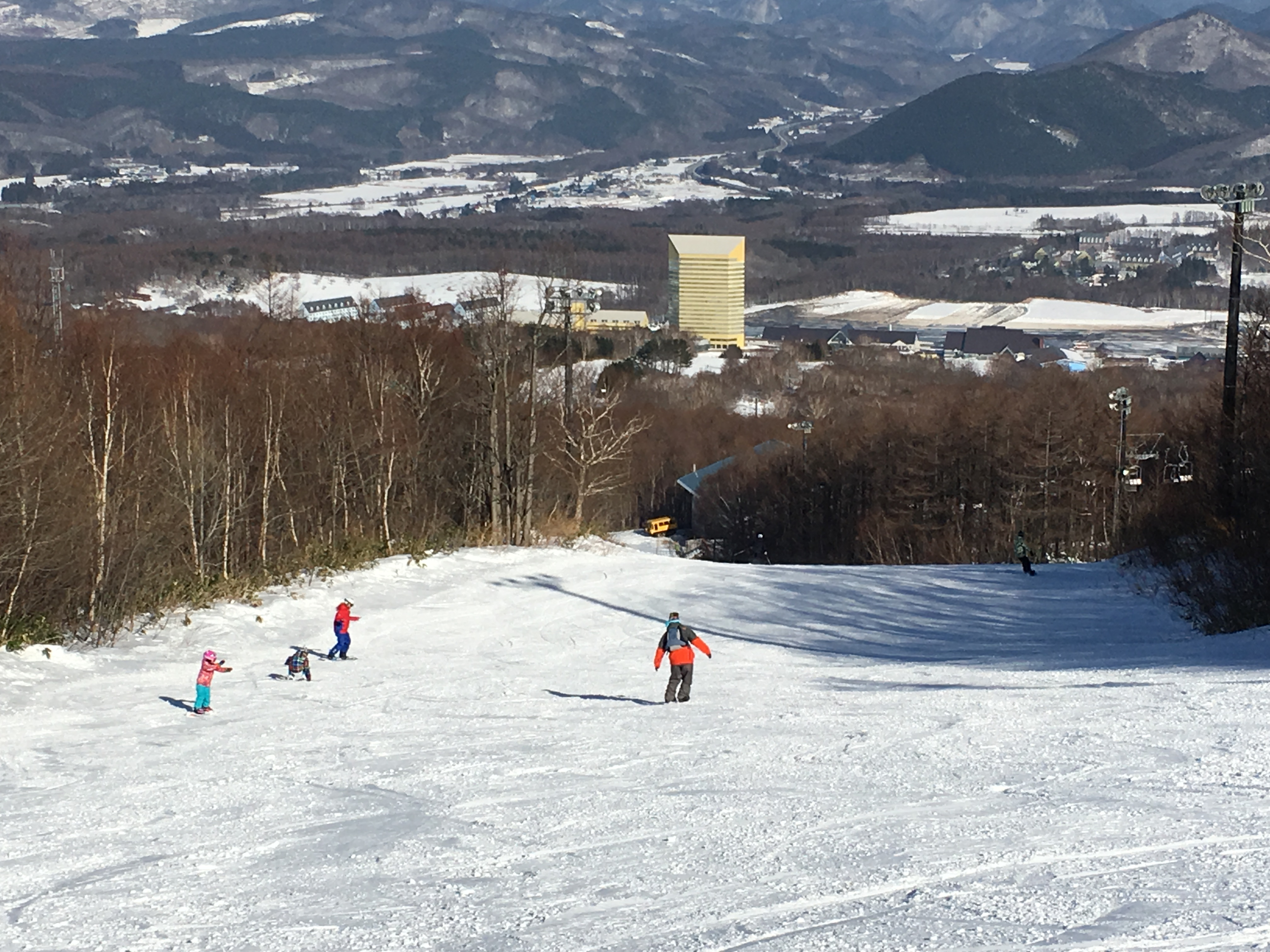
Otaka Run

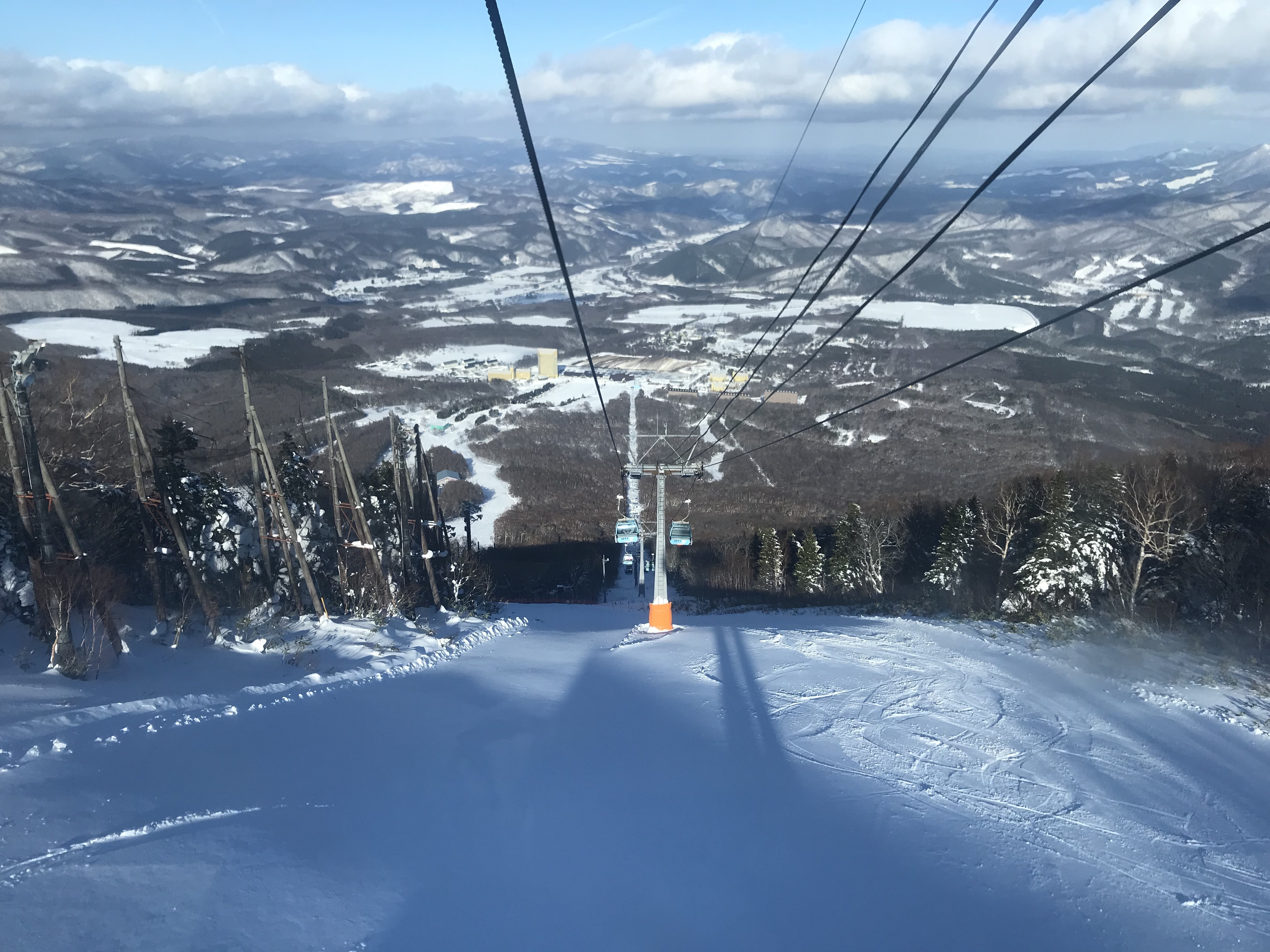
A view from Appi Gondola

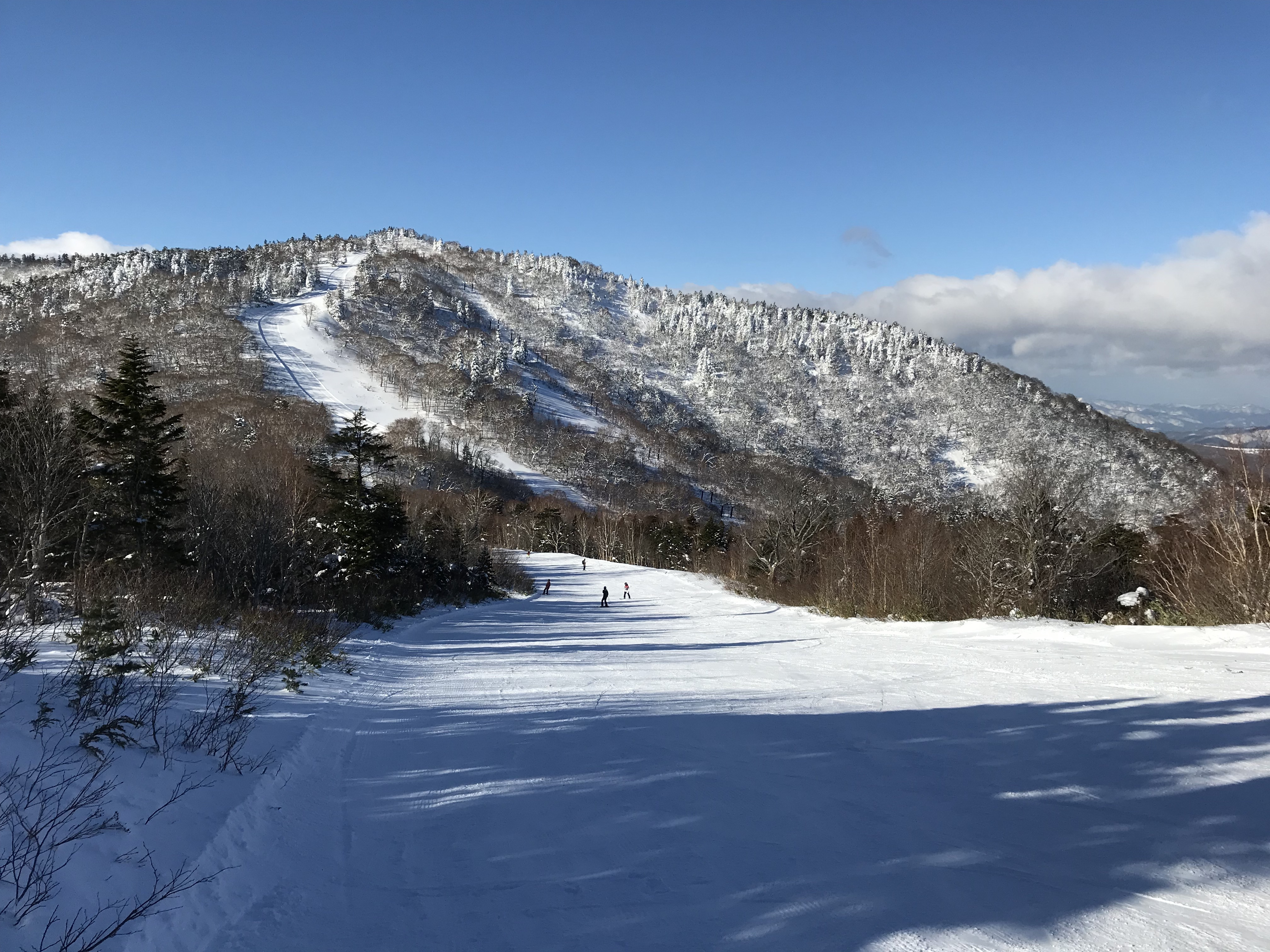
Mt. Nishimori and Yamabato Run

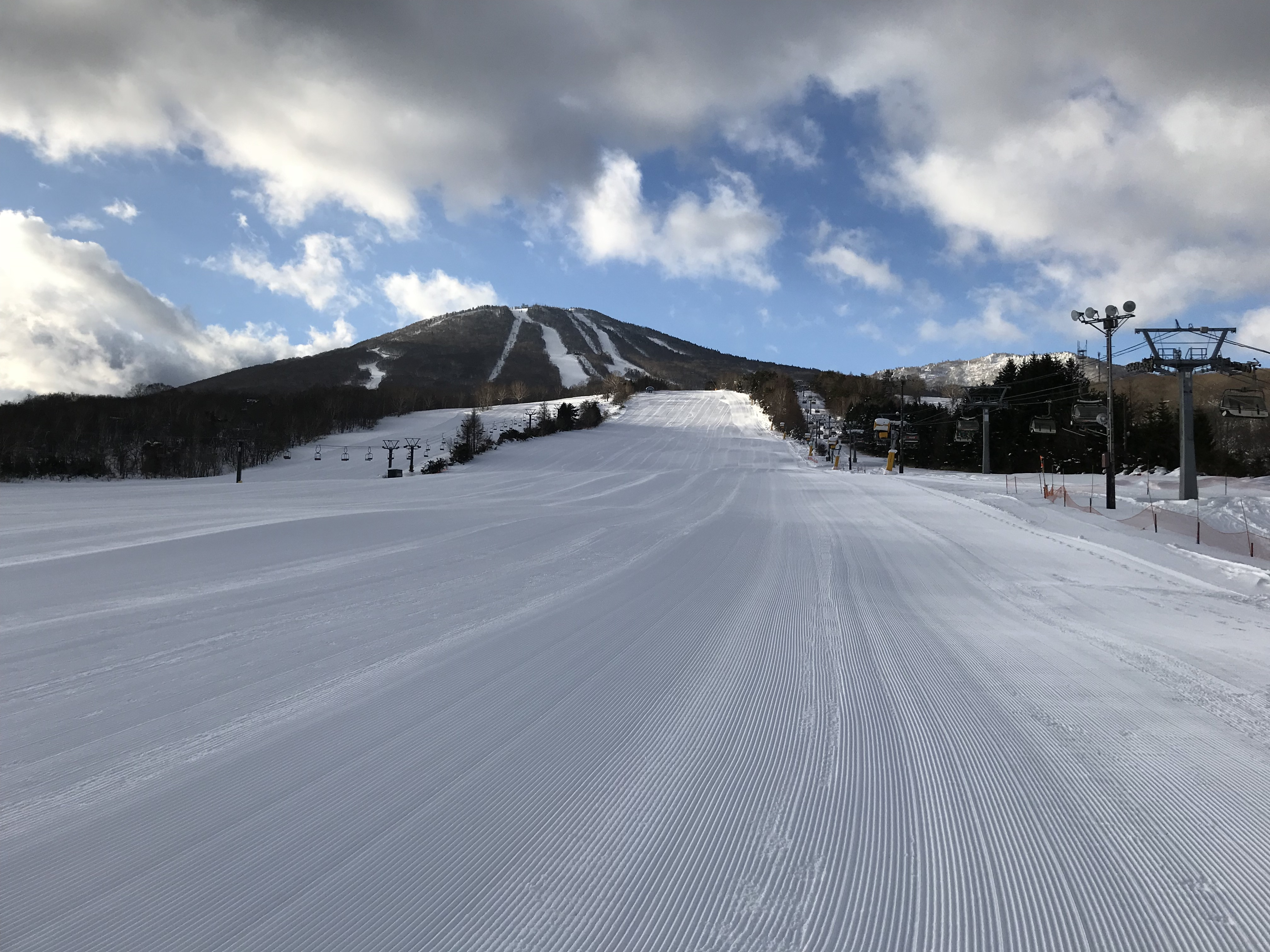
Shirakaba Run and Central Quad Lift

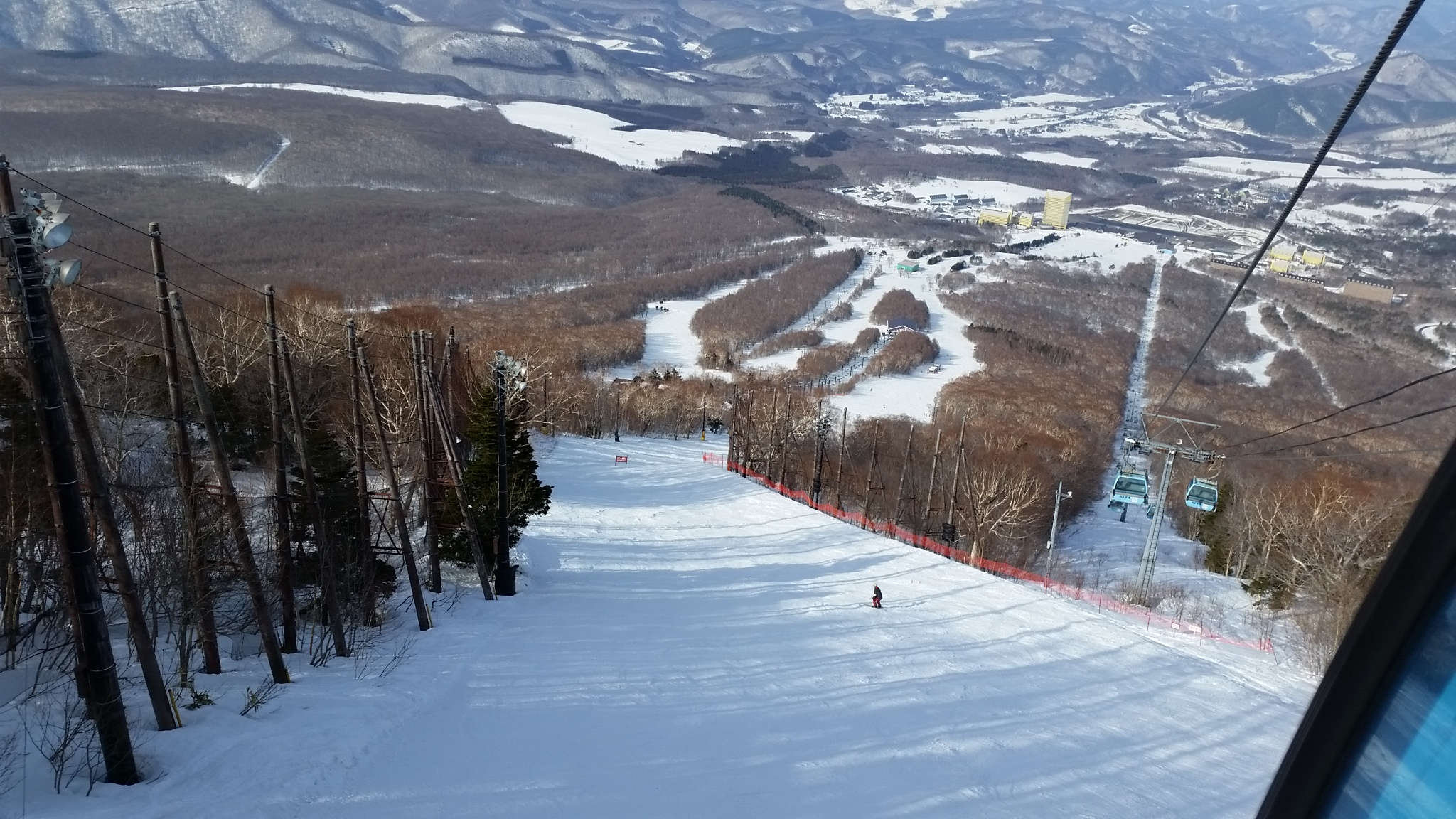
A view from Appi Gondola

Appi Kogen Ski Resort (安比高原スキー場, Appi Kōgen Sukī-jō), branded APPI, is one of the largest ski resorts in Japan, adjacent to the Towada-Hachimantai National Park. Operated by Iwate Hotel & Resort, the resort is most famous for its ski slopes, but it also has a guest ranch, golf courses, tennis courts, soccer fields, sports clubs, hot springs (onsen), and other amenities. The resort is 50 minutes from Morioka Station on the Tohoku Shinkansen by non-stop express bus. This station is approximately 496.5 km (308.5 mi) (2 hr 10 min) from Tokyo Station. By car, it is about 30-50 minute drive from the city of Morioka, 15 min from Matsuo-Hachimantai IC on the Tōhoku Expressway, or 20 min from Ashiro IC on the Tohoku Expwy.

== History ==
The development of the resort was led by Hiromasa Ezoe, a Japanese entrepreneur and the founder of the advertising and human resources company Recruit. The name of this area, Appi, is derived from the Ainu language word, meaning "a place where one can live in peace" (Kogen means heights or highlands in Japanese). The construction began in 1970s and the ski area was opened in December, 1981, with four chair lifts. The 'Sailer' area expansion was designed by Toni Sailer, an Austrian alpine ski racer and actor. The Hotel Appi Grand opened in 1985, and the Appi Hills Shirakaba-No-Mori 3 (formerly the Appi Grand Villa 3) opened in 1991. In 1992, the ski resort attracted 1.5 million visitors in a year. The Hotel Appi Grand Annex opened in 1996. Soccer fields opened in 1998. During 2003-2016, the resort was managed by the Kamori Kanko Group. In 2014, a memorial to Hiromasa Ezoe, the founder of the resort who had died in February 2013, was erected at the resort. Since 2016, the resort has been managed by the Asia Gate Holdings Co., Ltd. In 2005 and 2016, giant slalom races of the National Sports Festival of Japan were held in Appi Kogen.

== Skiing ==
The ski resort expands on two mountains, Mt. Maemori and Mt. Nishimori, with 21 trails, and a total trail length of 45.1 kilometres (28 mi) for skiers and snowboarders of all levels. It is the largest ski resort operated by a single company in Japan, with an average run of 2.1 km (1.3 mi), Japan’s longest average. The maximum slope is 34° on the Second Sailer Run A; the longest run is 5.5 km (3.4 mi) and the vertical drop is 828 m (2,717 ft). Lift service includes 2 gondolas and 14 chair lifts including 3 high-speed quad lifts and 11 double chairlifts. The resort is also family-friendly, with a kid's ski area, child care service, snow play areas, and a petting zoo. The winter ski season in Appi stretches over 5 months from December to early May. Nighttime skiing is available most nights; skiing and snowboarding lesson programs are available. CNN International ranked Appi Kogen the best ski resort in Asia.

== Lifts ==
Appi Kogen has 16 lifts, including two gondolas (Appi Gondola and Sailer Gondola), three high-speed detachable quad chairlifts (Central First Quad, Sailer Quad, and Vista Quad), and eleven double chairlifts.
| Lift Name | Capacity per Lift | Length | Capacity per Hour | Notes |
|---|---|---|---|---|
| Appi Gondola | 8 | 2820 m | 2000 |
| Central Quad | 4 | 954 m | 2000 | with bubble |
| Central First Lift | 2 | 1037 m | 1000 |
| Central Second Lift | 2 | 969 m | 1000 |
| Central Third Lift A | 2 | 773 m | 1000 |
| Central Third Lift B | 2 | 773 m | 1000 |
| Central Fourth Lift | 2 | 664 m | 1000 |
| Central Fifth lift | 2 | 1254 m | 1000 |
| Central Sixth Lift | 2 | 901 m | 1000 |
| Nishimori Lift | 2 | 652 m | 1000 |
| Sailer Gondola | 8 | 3494 m | 2400 |
| Sailer Quad | 4 | 2143 m | 2400 | with bubble |
| Sailer First Lift | 2 | 1351 m | 1000 |
| Sailer Second Lift | 2 | 1511 m | 1000 |
| Vista Quad | 4 | 1988 m | 2400 | with bubble |
| Sailer Connection Lift | 2 | 1288 m | 1000 |

== Golf courses ==
The Appi Kogen Golf Club has 4 courses, namely Hachimantai Course, Towada Course, Ryugamori Course, and Iwatesan Course, 36 holes in total, opened in 1978. LPGA of Japan Tour tournaments were held in 1984-88 and 1991-92. The Japan LPGA Championship Konica Minolta Cup on the LPGA of Japan Tour was held in the Appi Kogen Golf Club in September 2017.

== Other attractions ==
The ski resort is home to many concerts. A-Nation (2002), Dreams Come True (band) (2003), Glay (1998), Kaela Kimura (2005), Kome Kome Club (1992), L'Arc-en-Ciel (1999), Masayoshi Yamazaki (2000), Monkey Majik (2008), Morning Musume (2001), Mr. Children (1995), Sharam Q (1996), SMAP (2001), and Tube (band) (1994) held concerts in the resort.

== Hotels ==
On December 12, 2021 the Appi Hotels were rebranded to IHG Hotels. The Hotel Appi Grand Main Building and Tower changed to ANA Crowne Plaza Resort Appi Kogen. The Appi Hills Shirakaba no Mori 1, 2, 3 and Appi Kogen Onsen Hotels 1, 2 and 3 changed to ANA Holiday Inn Resort Appi Kogen. On February 4, 2022 the ANA InterContinental Appi Kogen Resort opened. There are also B&Bs. The 78 m (256 ft) tall Hotel Tower, opened in 1988, is the symbol of the resort.

== Notable people ==
- Reiichi Mikata (born 1967), Nordic combined skier and Olympic gold medalist; born in Hachimantai city and worked for the Appi Kogen Ski Resort
- Toni Sailer (1935–2009), alpine ski racer and Olympic gold medalist; designed the Sailer Area

== See also ==
- List of ski areas and resorts in Asia
- List of aerial lifts in Japan
