= Fudo =

Fudo may refer to:

== People ==
- Yuri Fudo (不動 裕理; born 1976), Japanese golfer

== Places ==
- Fudō Falls, Japan
- Fudō-mae Station, Japan

== Religion ==
- Fudo or Fudō (不動), the Japanese name for Acala

== Fictional characters ==
- Akira Fudo, the main protagonist of the Devilman franchise
- Rin Fudo, a supporting character from Mission: Yozakura Family
- Fudō Yūsei, a character from the Yu-Gi-Oh! series
