= Iwatesan =

Iwatesan may refer to:

- Mount Iwate (Iwate-san), a volcano in Iwate Prefecture, Japan
- Asteroid 11109 Iwatesan, named after the mountain
