= Hachimantai, Iwate =

Hachimantai 八幡平市
- City
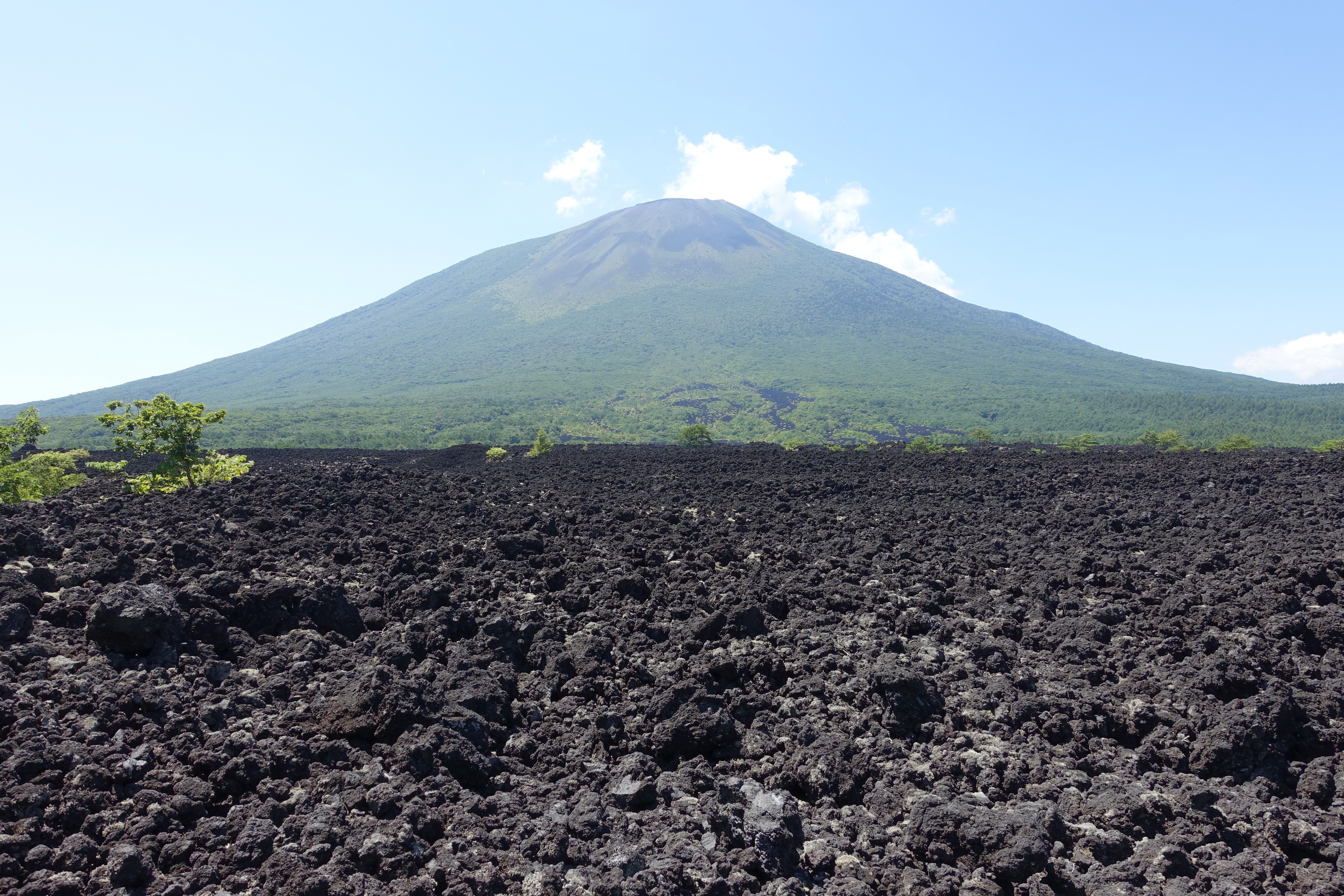
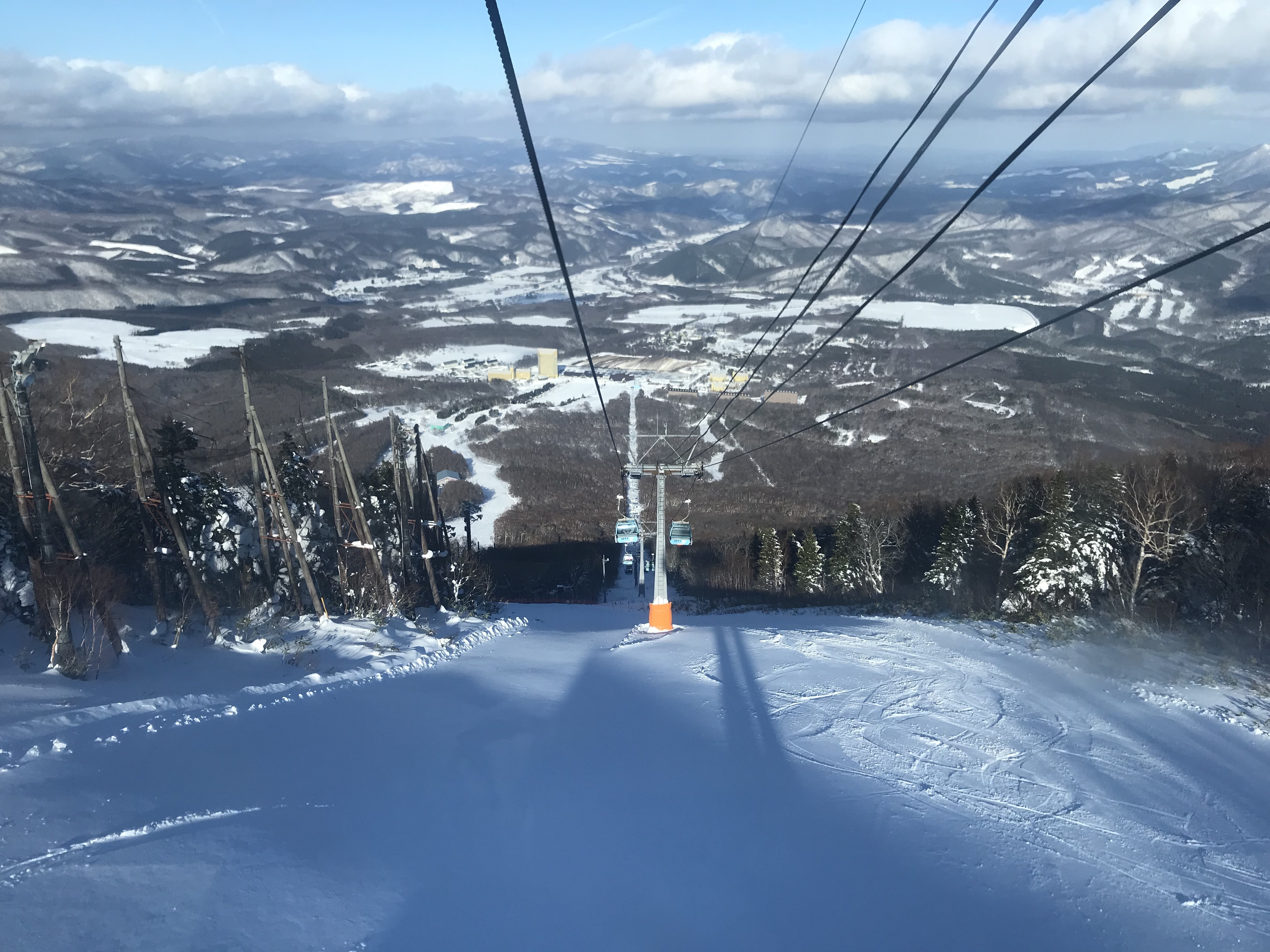
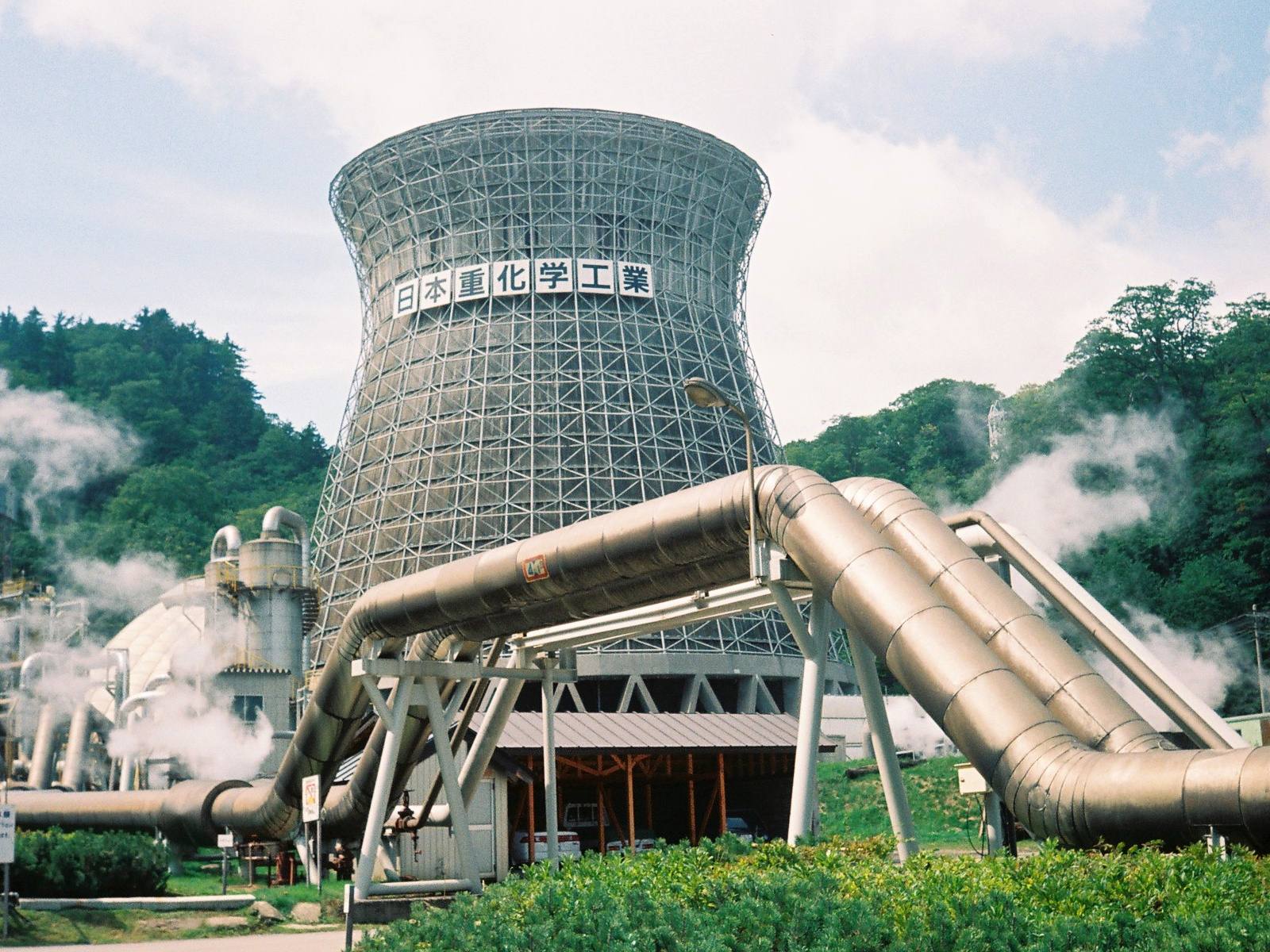
- Mount Iwate Appi Kogen Ski Resort Matsukawa Geothermal Power Plant

- Flag Seal
- Interactive map of Hachimantai
- Coordinates: 39°57′22″N 141°4′16″E
- Country: Japan
- Region: Tōhoku
- Prefecture: Iwate

Area
  - Total: 862.30 km^{2} (332.94 sq mi)

Population (April 1, 2020)
  - Total: 25,076
  - Density: 29.080/km^{2} (75.318/sq mi)
- Time zone: UTC+9 (Japan Standard Time)
- Phone number: 0195-76-2111
- Address: 62 Ōfuke dai-35 jiwari, Hachimantai-shi, Iwate-ken 028-7192
- Climate: Dfa
- Website: Official website
- Symbols
- Bird: Copper pheasant
- Flower: Rindo
- Tree: Japanese red pine

Hachimantai (八幡平市, Hachimantai-shi) is a city located in Iwate Prefecture, Japan. As of 1 April 2020, the city had an estimated population of 25,076, and a population density of 29 persons per km^{2} in 10,531 households. The total area of the city is 862.30 square kilometres (332.94 sq mi).

== Geography ==
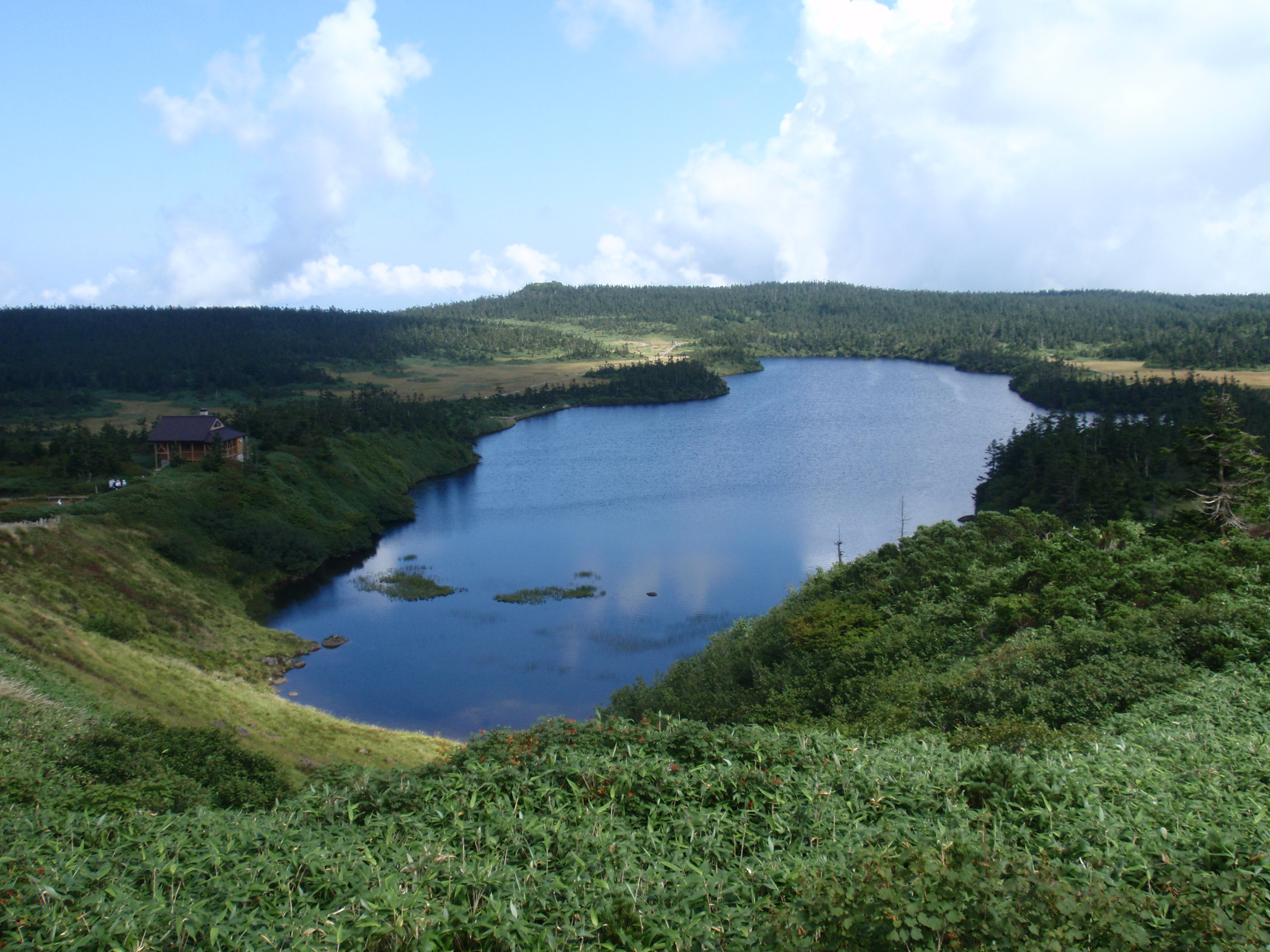
Lake Hachiman

Hachimantai is located in the Ōu Mountains of far northwest Iwate Prefecture, bordered by Aomori Prefecture to the north and Akita Prefecture to the west. The headwaters of the Yoneshiro River are in Hachimantai. Part of Mount Hachimantai and Mount Iwate are within its borders. Parts of the city are within the borders of the Towada-Hachimantai National Park. Mount Iwate, the highest mountain in Iwate Prefecture, is on the border of Hachimantai with Shizukuishi and Takizawa.

=== Neighboring municipalities ===
Akita Prefecture

- Kazuno
- Semboku

Aomori Prefecture

- Takko

Iwate Prefecture

- Ichinohe
- Iwate
- Morioka
- Ninohe
- Shizukuishi
- Takizawa

== Climate ==
Hachimantai has a humid continental climate (Köppen climate classification Dfa), the same as much of Hokkaido to the north, characterized by warm to hot summers and cold winters with heavy snowfall. The average annual temperature in Hachimantai is 9.3 °C. The average annual rainfall is 1387 mm, with September as the wettest month and February as the driest month. The temperatures are highest on average in August, at around 22.9 °C, and lowest in January, at around -3.4 °C.

Climate data for Iwatematsuo, Hachimantai (elevation 275 m, 1991–2020 normals, extremes 1976–present)
Month	Jan	Feb	Mar	Apr	May	Jun	Jul	Aug	Sep	Oct	Nov	Dec	Year
Record high °C (°F)	12.4 (54.3)	14.8 (58.6)	20.3 (68.5)	28.8 (83.8)	32.6 (90.7)	34.2 (93.6)	35.4 (95.7)	35.7 (96.3)	34.0 (93.2)	27.8 (82.0)	23.0 (73.4)	16.9 (62.4)	35.7 (96.3)
Mean daily maximum °C (°F)	0.8 (33.4)	1.9 (35.4)	6.2 (43.2)	13.5 (56.3)	19.8 (67.6)	23.6 (74.5)	26.6 (79.9)	27.7 (81.9)	23.4 (74.1)	17.1 (62.8)	10.0 (50.0)	3.4 (38.1)	14.5 (58.1)
Daily mean °C (°F)	−3.1 (26.4)	−2.5 (27.5)	1.4 (34.5)	7.6 (45.7)	13.8 (56.8)	18.0 (64.4)	21.6 (70.9)	22.5 (72.5)	18.1 (64.6)	11.4 (52.5)	5.0 (41.0)	−0.4 (31.3)	9.4 (48.9)
Mean daily minimum °C (°F)	−7.9 (17.8)	−7.6 (18.3)	−3.7 (25.3)	1.4 (34.5)	7.8 (46.0)	13.0 (55.4)	17.5 (63.5)	18.3 (64.9)	13.3 (55.9)	5.8 (42.4)	0.1 (32.2)	−4.5 (23.9)	4.5 (40.1)
Record low °C (°F)	−21.8 (−7.2)	−22.2 (−8.0)	−15.4 (4.3)	−11.0 (12.2)	−2.7 (27.1)	1.7 (35.1)	7.7 (45.9)	7.7 (45.9)	1.3 (34.3)	−4.3 (24.3)	−11.0 (12.2)	−18.0 (−0.4)	−22.2 (−8.0)
Average precipitation mm (inches)	42.5 (1.67)	41.7 (1.64)	66.7 (2.63)	65.0 (2.56)	75.8 (2.98)	87.4 (3.44)	154.5 (6.08)	158.3 (6.23)	149.1 (5.87)	100.5 (3.96)	75.4 (2.97)	67.1 (2.64)	1,076.8 (42.39)
Average snowfall cm (inches)	122 (48)	108 (43)	60 (24)	5 (2.0)	0 (0)	0 (0)	0 (0)	0 (0)	0 (0)	0 (0)	10 (3.9)	90 (35)	392 (154)
Average precipitation days (≥ 1.0 mm)	10.9	9.9	11.2	9.9	9.8	8.7	11.6	10.7	11.2	10.9	12.5	12.8	130.0
Mean monthly sunshine hours	82.7	88.1	139.0	173.7	187.9	152.5	118.3	135.8	128.1	131.4	102.6	75.1	1,515.9
Source: Japan Meteorological Agency (1991–2020 normals, extremes 1976–present)

Climate data for Araya, Hachimantai (elevation 290 m, 1991–2020 normals, extremes 1976–present)
Month	Jan	Feb	Mar	Apr	May	Jun	Jul	Aug	Sep	Oct	Nov	Dec	Year
Record high °C (°F)	12.3 (54.1)	13.5 (56.3)	19.4 (66.9)	28.2 (82.8)	32.3 (90.1)	33.4 (92.1)	34.3 (93.7)	35.0 (95.0)	32.9 (91.2)	28.6 (83.5)	23.0 (73.4)	16.2 (61.2)	35.0 (95.0)
Mean daily maximum °C (°F)	0.2 (32.4)	1.2 (34.2)	5.3 (41.5)	12.7 (54.9)	19.0 (66.2)	22.6 (72.7)	25.5 (77.9)	26.7 (80.1)	22.7 (72.9)	16.5 (61.7)	9.5 (49.1)	2.8 (37.0)	13.7 (56.7)
Daily mean °C (°F)	−3.2 (26.2)	−2.6 (27.3)	0.8 (33.4)	6.9 (44.4)	13.2 (55.8)	17.3 (63.1)	20.9 (69.6)	21.9 (71.4)	17.6 (63.7)	11.0 (51.8)	4.9 (40.8)	−0.7 (30.7)	9.0 (48.2)
Mean daily minimum °C (°F)	−7.6 (18.3)	−7.2 (19.0)	−4.1 (24.6)	1.2 (34.2)	7.3 (45.1)	12.5 (54.5)	17.1 (62.8)	18.0 (64.4)	13.2 (55.8)	5.9 (42.6)	0.4 (32.7)	−4.4 (24.1)	4.3 (39.7)
Record low °C (°F)	−20.1 (−4.2)	−20.8 (−5.4)	−18.4 (−1.1)	−12.4 (9.7)	−3.1 (26.4)	2.0 (35.6)	6.7 (44.1)	7.1 (44.8)	0.2 (32.4)	−3.4 (25.9)	−11.4 (11.5)	−17.7 (0.1)	−20.8 (−5.4)
Average precipitation mm (inches)	60.9 (2.40)	53.1 (2.09)	72.0 (2.83)	66.9 (2.63)	76.6 (3.02)	95.9 (3.78)	171.4 (6.75)	175.3 (6.90)	157.8 (6.21)	119.3 (4.70)	93.3 (3.67)	90.8 (3.57)	1,235.4 (48.64)
Average precipitation days (≥ 1.0 mm)	15.8	14.3	13.9	11.8	10.8	9.8	12.0	12.2	12.2	12.9	14.7	16.4	156.4
Mean monthly sunshine hours	62.1	78.4	122.8	167.6	184.6	158.1	124.8	149.6	137.7	137.2	100.2	63.3	1,486.3
Source: Japan Meteorological Agency (1991–2020 normals, extremes 1976–present)

== Demographics ==
Per Japanese census data, the population of Hachimantai peaked at around the year 1960 and has declined steadily over the past 60 years.

Historical population
Year	Pop.	±%
1920	21,815	—
1930	27,328	+25.3%
1940	36,316	+32.9%
1950	47,852	+31.8%
1960	53,806	+12.4%
1970	36,764	−31.7%
1980	34,926	−5.0%
1990	33,287	−4.7%
2000	32,485	−2.4%
2010	28,690	−11.7%
2020	24,023	−16.3%

== History ==
The area of present-day Hachimantai was part of ancient Mutsu Province. The area was dominated by the Nanbu clan from the early Muromachi period. During the Edo period Tokugawa shogunate, the area was under Morioka Domain, and was divided between Ninohe District in the north and Iwate District in the south.

In the early Meiji period, the village of Arasawa was created within Ninohe District on April 1, 1889, with the establishment of the modern municipalities system. Arasawa merged with neighboring Tayama Village on September 30, 1956, to form the town of Ashiro. Ashiro was transferred to Iwate District on April 1, 2002.

Likewise, on April 1, 1889, the villages of Tairadate, Obun, Dendo and Terada were established within Kita-Iwate District. Kita-Iwate was merged with Minami-Iwate in 1896. The four villages merged on September 30, 1956, to form the town of Nishine.

The city of Hachimantai was established on September 1, 2005, from the merger of the towns of Ashiro and Nishine, and the village of Matsuo.

== Government ==
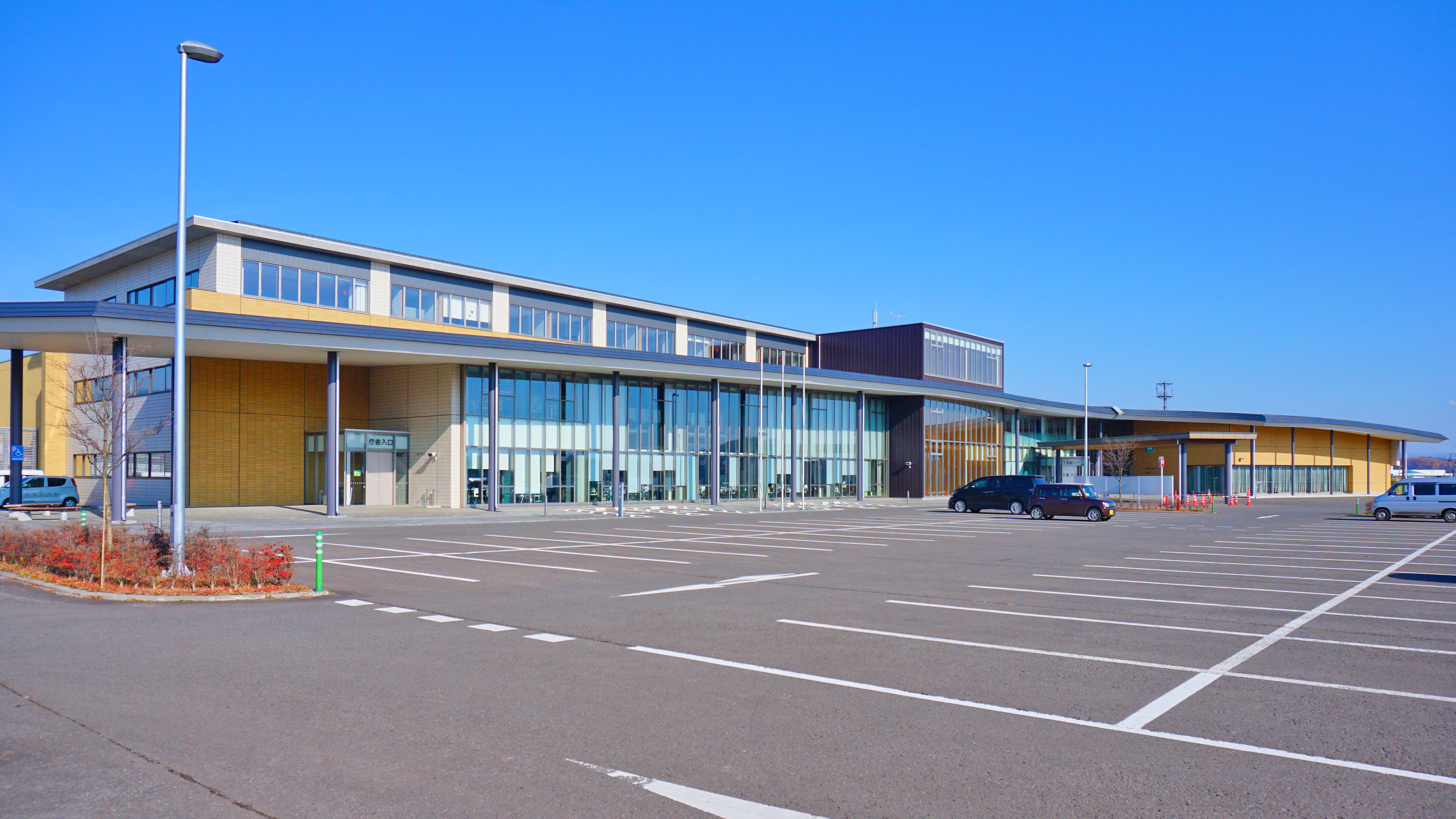
Hachimantai City Hall

Hachimantai has a mayor-council form of government with a directly elected mayor and a unicameral city legislature of 22 members. Hachimantai, together with the towns of Iwate and Kuzumaki contribute two seats to the Iwate Prefectural legislature. In terms of national politics, the city is part of Iwate 2nd district of the lower house of the Diet of Japan.

== Economy ==
The local economy is based on agriculture, forestry and seasonal tourism.

== Education ==
Hachimantai has ten public elementary schools and four public middle schools operated by the city government, and one public high school operated by the Iwate Prefectural Board of Education.

== Transportation ==
=== Railway ===
East Japan Railway Company (JR East) - Hanawa Line

- Higashi-Ōbuke - Ōbuke - Tairadate - Kitamori - Matsuo-Hachimantai - Appi-Kōgen - Akasakata - Koyanohata - Arayashimmachi - Yokoma - Tayama - Anihata

=== Highway ===
- Tōhoku Expressway – Nishine IC, Iwatesan SA, Matsuo-Hachimantai IC, Maemoriyama PA, Ajiro JCT, Ajiro IC, Tayama PA
- Hachinohe Expressway – Ajiro JCT
- National Route 282 – Nishine roadside station

== Sister cities ==
- (Japan) Miyako, Iwate – from October 1, 1986
- (Japan) Nago, Okinawa – from January 28, 1988
- Altenmarkt, Salzburg, Austria, friendship city from November 13, 1994, with former Matsuo Village

== Local attractions ==
- Appi Kogen Ski Resort
- Fudō Falls, One of Japan's Top 100 Waterfalls
- Hachimantai hot spring resorts
- Matsukawa Geothermal Power Plant, the first commercial geothermal plant in Japan
- Matsukawa Gorge
- Matsuo mine, an abandoned mine
- Mount Hachimantai
- Nanbu Fuji Golf Course
- Towada-Hachimantai National Park
- Yakehashiri Lava Flow

== Notable people from Hachimantai ==
- Junshirō Kobayashi, ski jumper
- Ryōyū Kobayashi, ski jumper
- Reiichi Mikata, Nordic combined skier
- Hideji Oda, manga artist
- Hanahikari Setsuo, sumo wrestler
