= Mount Hachimantai =

Highest peak in a group of stratovolcanoes in Honshu, Japan

- 八幡平
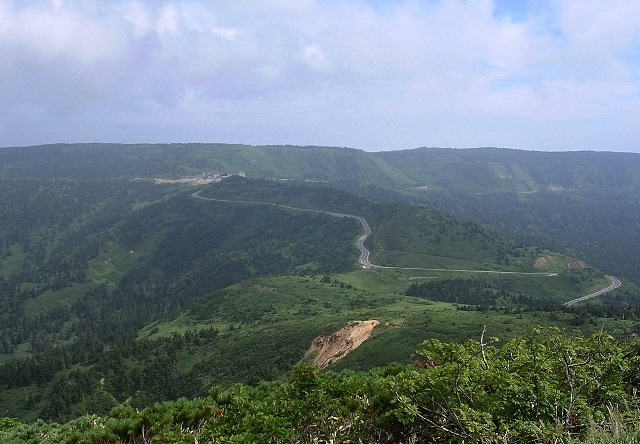
- Hachimantai Plateau

Highest point
- Elevation: 1,613 m (5,292 ft)
- Coordinates: 39°57′28″N 140°51′15″E

Geography
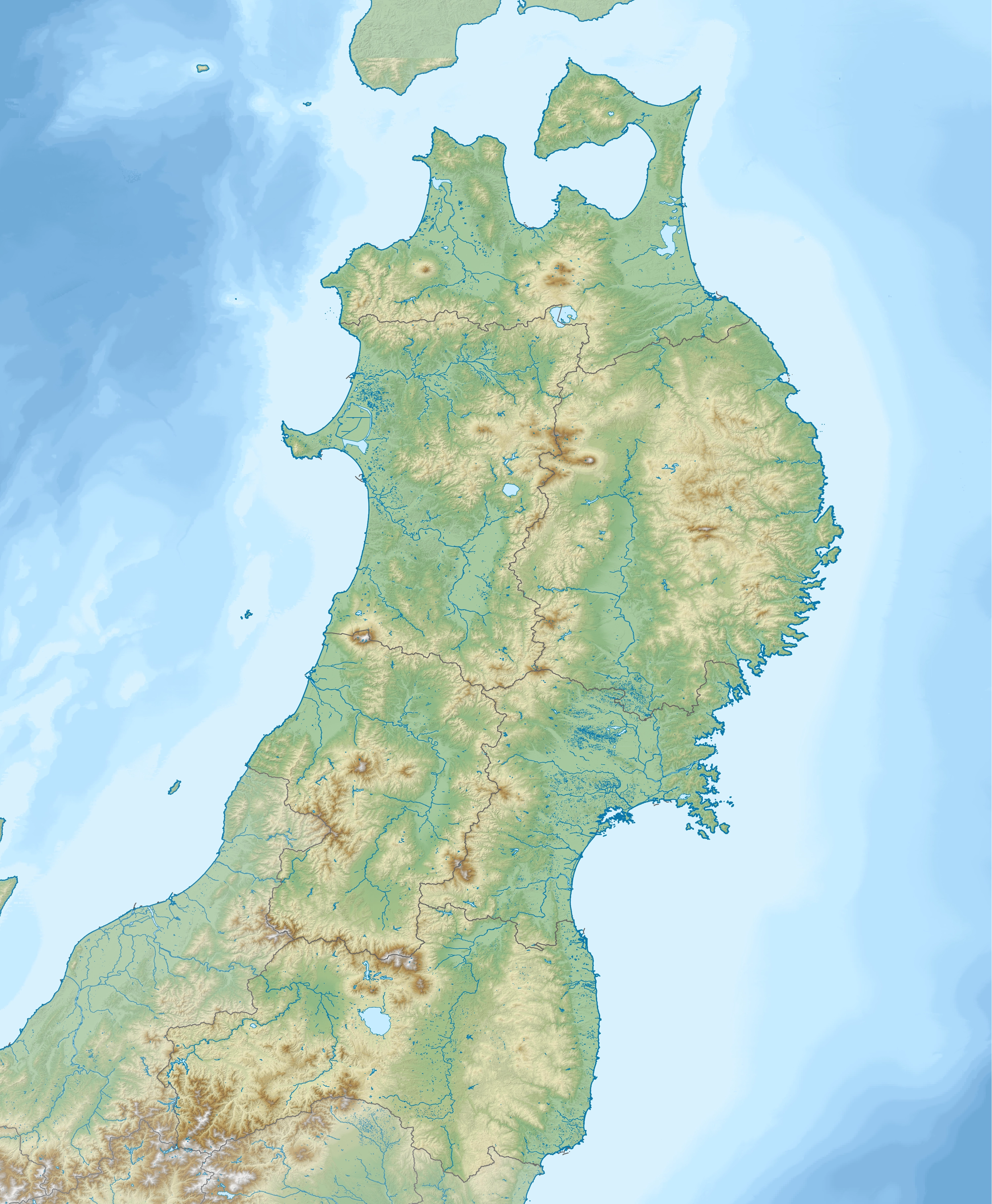
- Location within Tohoku, Japan
- Location: Tōhoku region, Honshū, Japan
- Parent range: Ōu Mountains

Geology
- Mountain type: Stratovolcano
- Volcanic zone: Nasu Volcanic Zone
- Volcanic arc: Northeastern Japan Arc
- Last eruption: 5350 BCE

Mount Hachimantai (八幡平, Hachimantai) is the highest peak of a group of stratovolcanos distributed around the Hachimantai plateau in the Ōu Mountains in northern Honshū, Japan. This volcanic plateau is part of the Nasu Volcanic Zone and straddles the border between the Iwate Prefecture and Akita Prefecture. The volcano is listed as one of the 100 Famous Japanese Mountains, and forms part of the Towada-Hachimantai National Park.

== Etymology ==
There are several legends concerning the origin of the name “Hachimantai”. In one legend, the late Nara period General Sakanoue no Tamuramaro pursued a group of Emishi warriors into the area, and was so impressed with the natural beauty of the region that he said it must be the abode of the kami Hachiman. In another legend, the area was named after Minamoto Yoshiie, a late Heian period warrior whose nickname was “Hachiman Tarō”.

== Geography ==
=== Situation ===
The Hachimantai plateau is located approximately 40 kilometres (25 mi) south of Lake Towada and 18 kilometres (11 mi) northeast of Lake Tazawa, within the borders of the city of Hachimantai, Iwate, and village of Kazuno, Akita. Mount Akita-Komagatake the highest peak in Akita Prefecture, lies to the southwest, and Mount Iwate is to the southeast. Both peaks are sometimes included in the geographic perimeter of the Hachimantai plateau, although they form distinct volcanic groups.

=== Geology ===
In a general sense, the Hachimantai plateau is an ancient volcanic shield, levelled by erosion or deformed by landslides or lateral overlaps, or covered by products of more recent volcanic activity. The deepest layer is composed of Tertiary bedrock resting on a layer of Paleozoic sedimentary rocks containing Cretaceous granite blocks. The lithospheric layer is composed of acid pyroclastic rock of the Lower Pleistocene [and of the Holocene. On the surface, the volcanic extent is composed of magmatic rocks: ignimbrite and volcanic cones of andesite, dacite, and basalt. On the Hachimantai plateau and in its immediate periphery, the relief is marked by two chains of volcanic cones, aligned one along a north–south axis and the other a west–east axis, and which intersect at the site of the Mount Hachimantai. The north-south chain extends for 10 km and includes, from north to south, Mount Mokko (1577 m), Mount Morobi (1516 m), an anonymous peak (1481 m), Mount Keson (1448 m), Mount Ōbuka (1541 m) and Mount Komokko (1467 m). The west-east range is 15 km long and includes, from west to east, Mount Fukenoyu (1120 m), Mount Hachimantai, Mount Gentan (1595 m), Mount Appi (1176 m), Mount Ebisu (1496 m) and Mount Daikoku (1446 m), Mount Yanomune (1397 m), Mount Maemori (1304 m) and Mount Nishimori (1328 m). This second chain is extends to the west to include the stratovolcano Mount Akita-Yakeyama (1366 m) which has a double summit crate. More than twenty craters are distributed on the plateau, sometimes forming chains, with diameters ranging from a few meters to 180 m. Most of these volcanic depressions are partially filled by lakes or marshes.

== History ==
Today, hydrothermal activity is maintained in and around the caldera of Mount Akita-Yakeyama in the form of fumaroles, the circulation of water from hot springs and, in places, boiling puddles of mud and sulfur deposits. In the common era, more than eight eruptions of Mount Akita-Yakeyama were recorded, notably in 1678, three in the nineteenth century, and five in the twentieth century, but no eruptions of Mount Hachimantai itself. However, the Japan Meteorological Agency, in compliance with international standards since 2003, considers that a volcano is active if it has erupted during the Holocene, for the last 10,000 years or so, or shows significant geothermal activity. As a result, the entire Hachimantai Plateau (including Mount Hachimantai) in its list of active volcanoes in Japan.

== Human activity ==
=== Mineral extraction ===
In 1882, a villager discovered a native sulphur outcrop in the village of Matsuo, at the foot of the southeast slope of Mount Chausu. The large-scale exploitation of the deposit began in 1914 with the opening of the Matsuo mine, which also produced iron and copper. The mine employed 1500 people at its peak, but was closed in 1971.

=== Tourism ===
The Hachimantai area is accessible from the city centers of Kazuno, Hachimantai, Semboku and Morioka. The Aspite Line is a 27-km mountain sightseeing road that runs through the area noted for its autumn scenery and high walls of snow in spring.

=== Winter sports ===
Apppi Kogen Ski Resort is one of the largest in Japan, with 21 ski runs and over 45 kilometers of trails, with six lifts. The Hachimantai Resort has two areas: The Panorama Ski Area has seven ski runs and four lifts, and is popular with novices. The Shimokura Ski Area has three runs and three lifts, and is popular with medium to advanced skiers

=== Onsen ===
As the Hachimantai Plateau is a particularly active geothermal area, traditional hot springs resorts, some of which have a history of over 250 years, are common. The temperature and composition of the water varies from location to location. The Hachimantai onsen is a sulfur spring. Appi onsen is a simple alkaline spring, and Shin-Appi onsen has highly saline water. The Toshichi onsen at 1400 meters is the highest in the Tohoku region and has milky-white waters.

=== Environmental Protection ===
Mount Hachimantai and its immediate surroundings have been protected since February 1936 in the Towada-Hachimantai National Park, which covers an area of 855.34 km2 divided into two zones: one includes the Towada crater lake at the Prefectures of Akita and Aomori, the other the high volcanic plateau Hachimantai. Hachimantai High Plateau is a biotope for the cohabitation of many wild bird species and its forests and wetlands provide fertile ground for various plant species including several varieties of alpine plants.

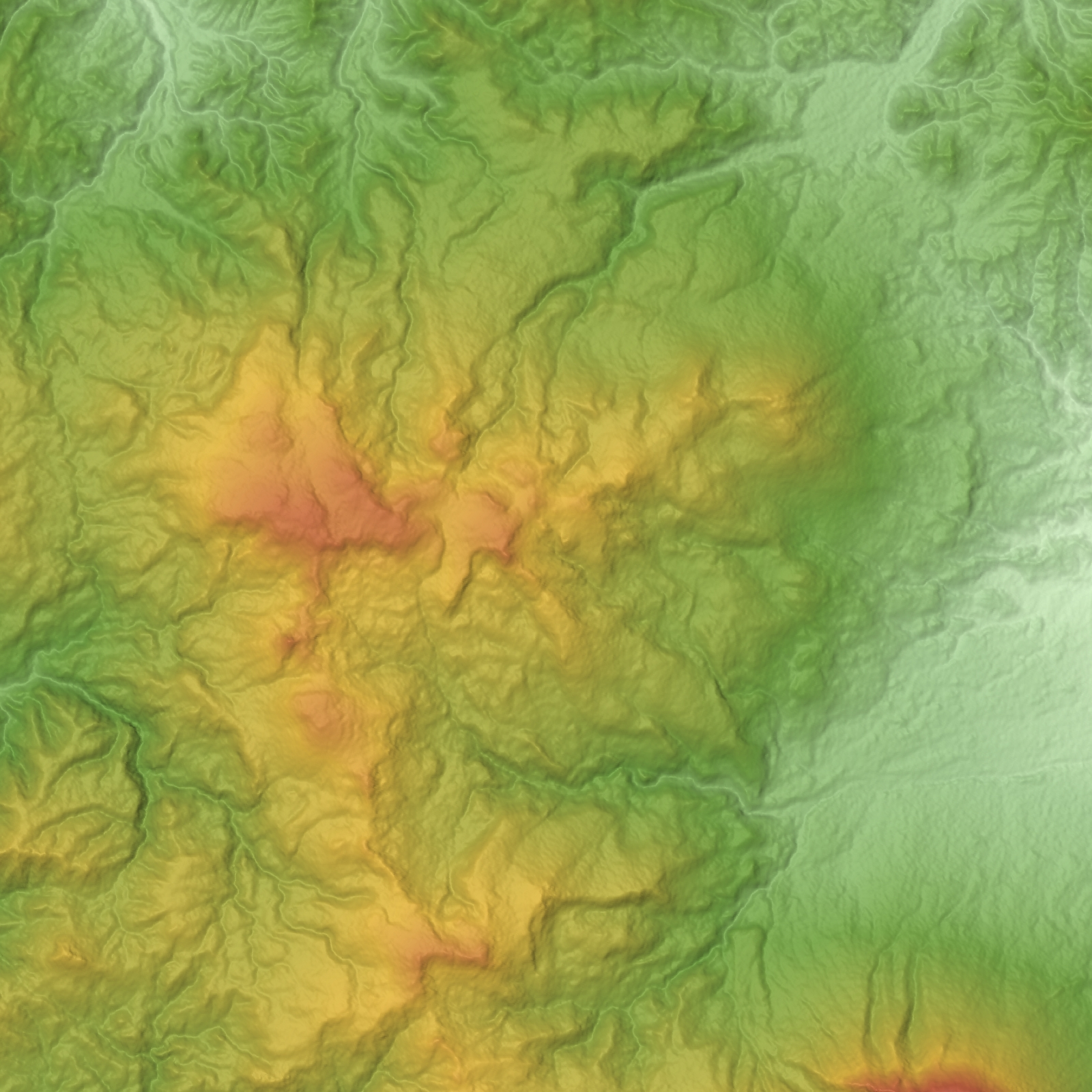
Hachimantai Volcano Group

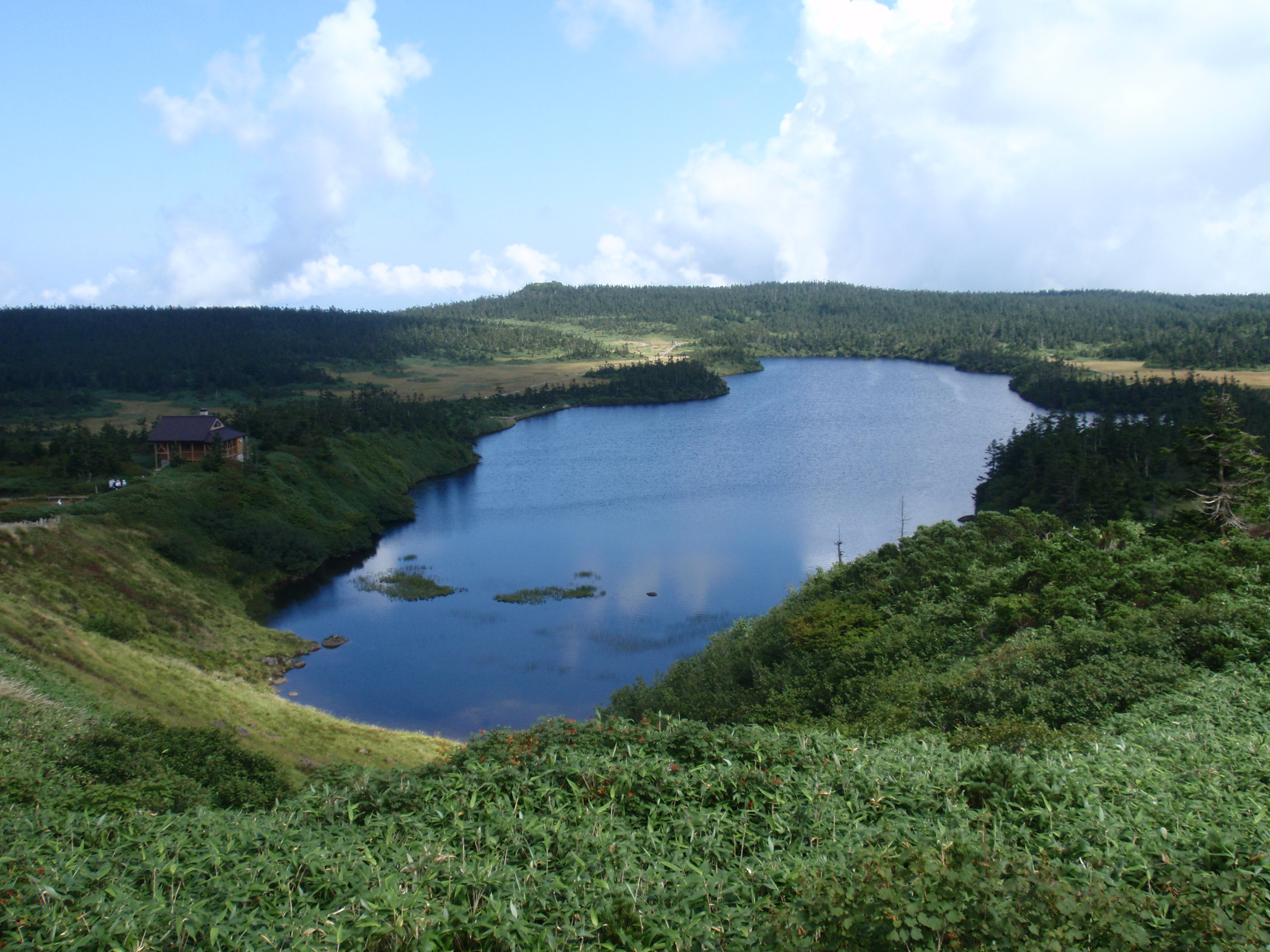
Hachiman Pond

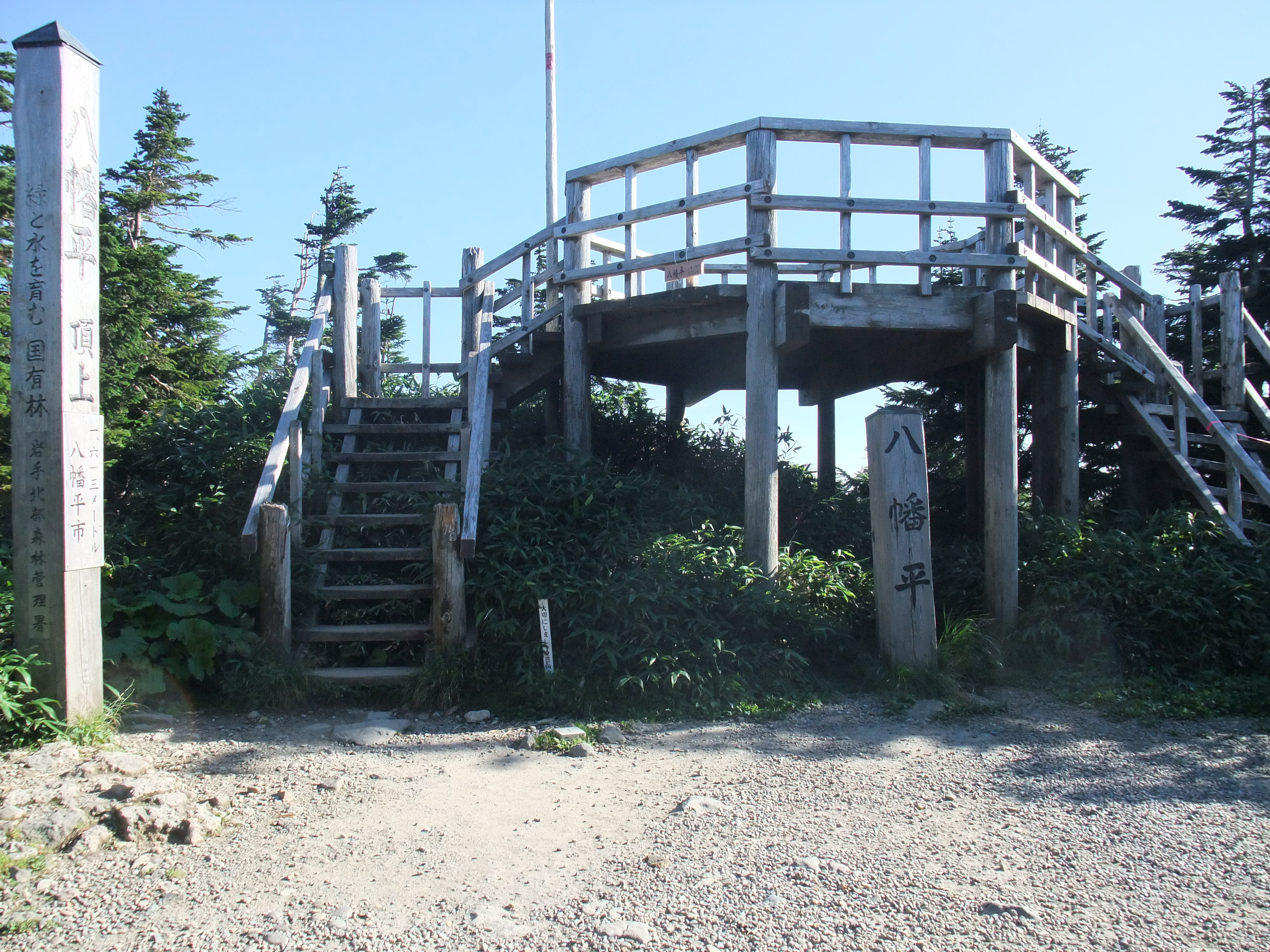
The summit of Mount Hachimantai

== See also ==
- List of volcanoes in Japan
- List of mountains in Japan
