= Matsuo mine =

Mine in Japan

Matsuo Mine
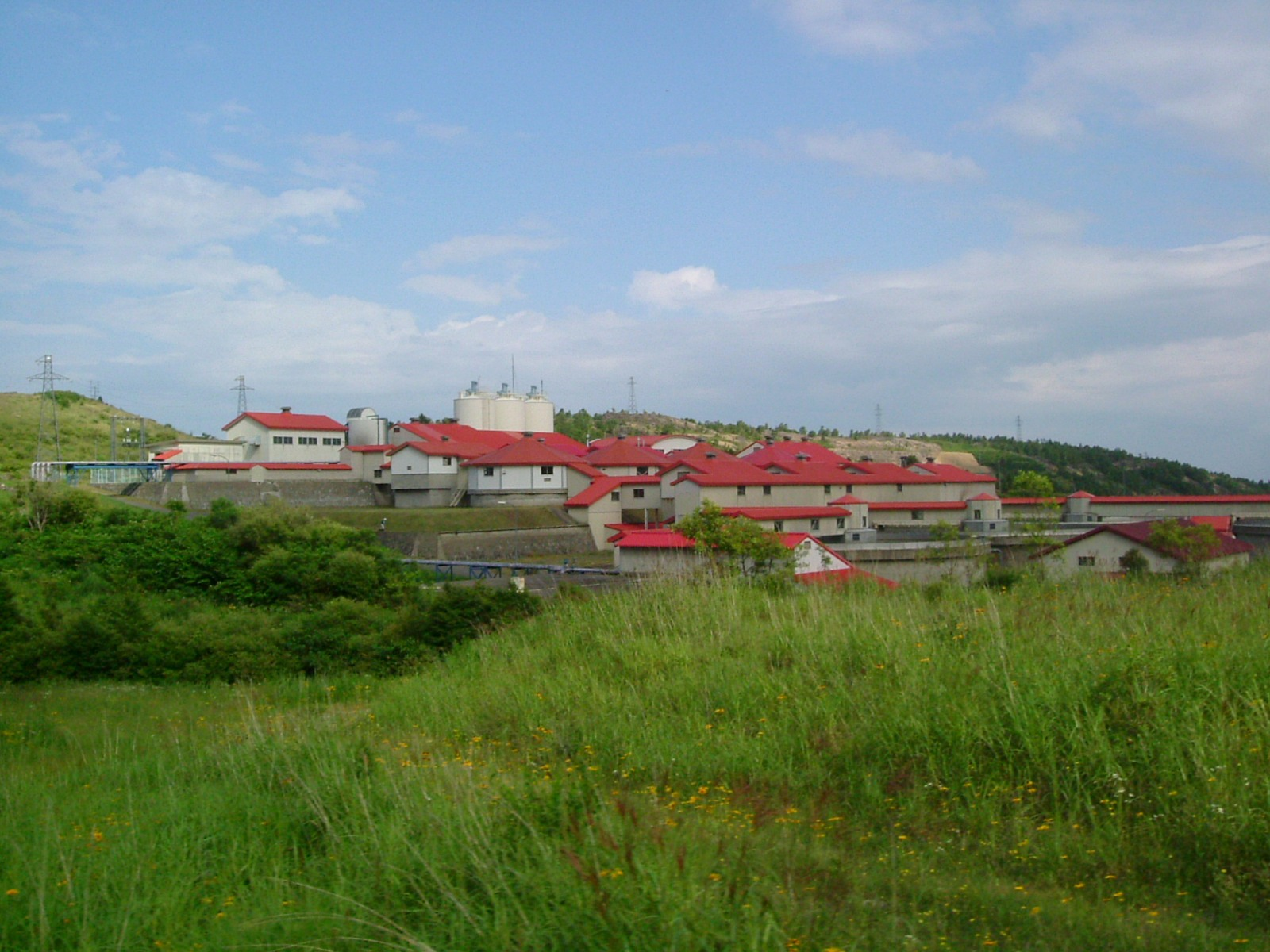

- Location within Japan
- Location: Matsuo, Hachimantai,Iwate, Japan; 39°56′17.3″N 140°56′15.76″E
- Products: Iron, sulphur
- Opened: 1914
- Closed: 1971

Matsuo Mine (松尾鉱山), was an iron and sulphur mine located in the village of Matsuo, Iwate Prefecture in the Tohoku region of northern Japan. The area is now part of the city of Hachimantai. The mine opened in 1914 and closed in 1979 leaving a ghost town behind.

== History ==
The Hachimantai Plateau where the mine is located in Ōu Mountains of central Honshu is a volcanic area and the presence of sulphur deposits was well known from an early age; however, due to the remoteness of the area and difficulty of transport, these deposits were not exploited. Iron pyrites were discovered by local villagers in 1882 in Matsuo village. In 1911, a Yokohama-based trading company, Matsuda-ya, began modern mine development at an altitude of 900 metres (3,000 ft) at the base of the peak of Higashi-Hachimantai. In 1934, the Japanese Government Railway Hanawa Line was extended to near the mine, and Ōbuke Station was established.

At one point, the Matsuo mine accounted for 30% of Japan’s sulphur production and 15% of its pyrite, boasting that it had the greatest production in Asia. In the late 1950s, it was the third largest mine in Japan in terms of tonnage of ore: 469,000 tons of iron ore and 200,000 tons of sulphur. However, in the 1960s, the demand for sulphur was less, and the production of low-cost sulphur as a byproduct of oil refining and the increasing availability of cheap imported iron ore caused the mine severe economic distress. In order to drastically reduce costs, the conversion to an open pit mine was considered and rejected. In 1969, the company went bankrupt. A new company was formed to concentrate solely on pyrite extraction; however, this venture also failed by 1972 and the mine has been closed since that time.

== Mine town ==
The Matsuo mine employed 1132 miners in 1920, 4145 miners in 1935, and 8152 miners in 1940. During World War II, an unknown number of conscript Korean labourers were also used. The peak number of employees was 13,594 in the year 1960.

Due to the location of the mine, the company had to create a complete city for the workers and to provide numerous welfare facilities such as elementary and junior high schools, hospitals, and music halls. In an era before government public housing, the town had apartment blocks in reinforced concrete with flush toilets and central heating. The town was publicised as a "paradise on the cloud" to secure workers and their families. After the mine closed, all wooden buildings were incinerated to prevent the possibility of fire, leaving only the reinforced concrete structures.

== Environmental issues ==
The original vegetation in the area was beech forest. However, due to smoke from sulphur smelting, the soil surrounding the mine has become very acid, and can no longer support most trees. Wastewater flowing from the mine is also strongly acidic (ph 2), and includes large amounts of arsenic. As the flow is from 17 to 24 tons per minute, it affects the Kitakami River and Pacific coast of Iwate Prefecture. A waste water treatment plant remains in operation.

== In popular culture ==
Due to its misty climate the town has been described as the "real Silent Hill". Adam Dodd of Bloody Disgusting described 11 abandoned buildings in the mist as "eerie", ranking the location #6 in his article, "Eight Terrifying Places Horror Games Should Visit".

== Gallery ==
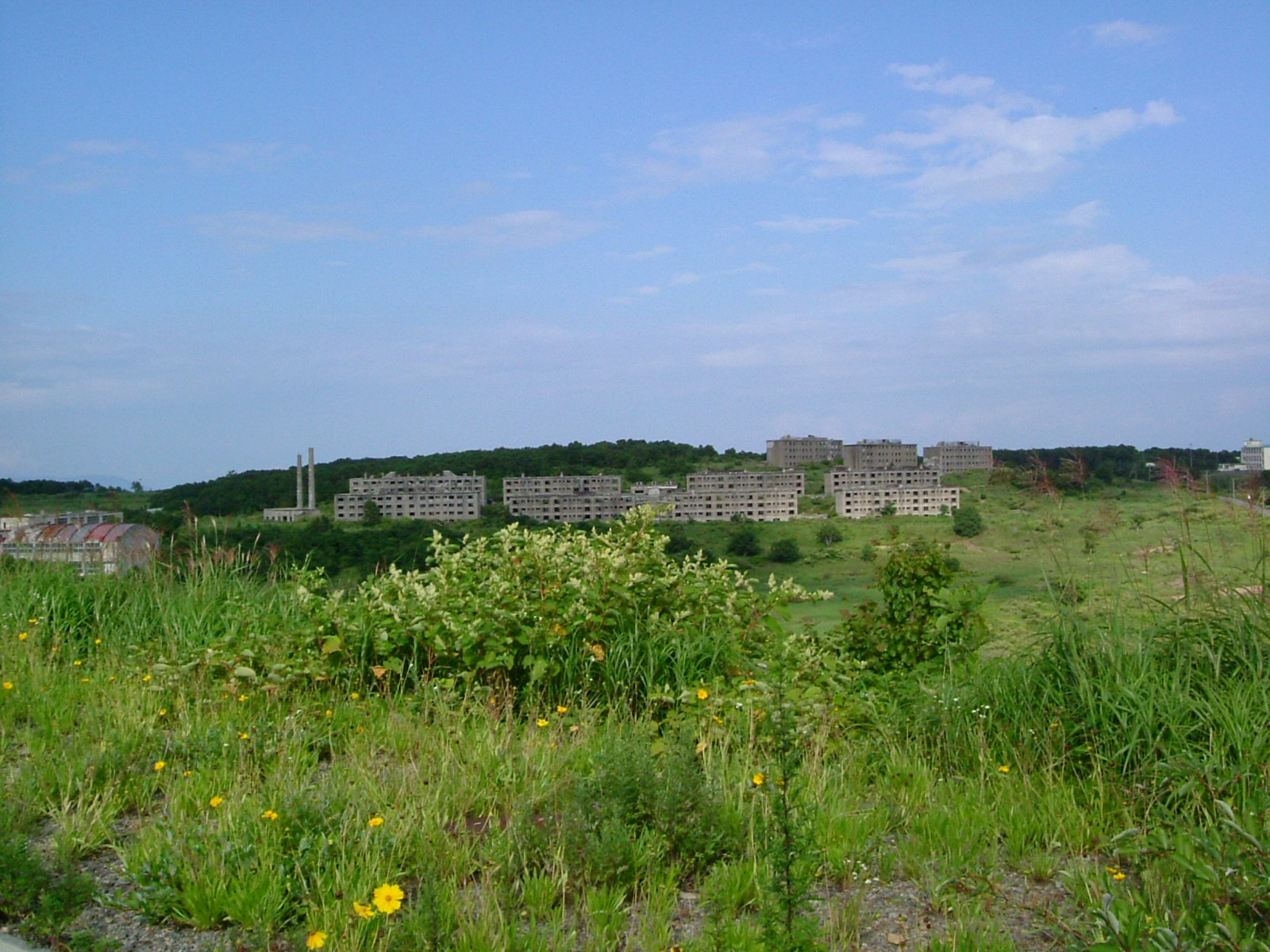
Abandoned building complex

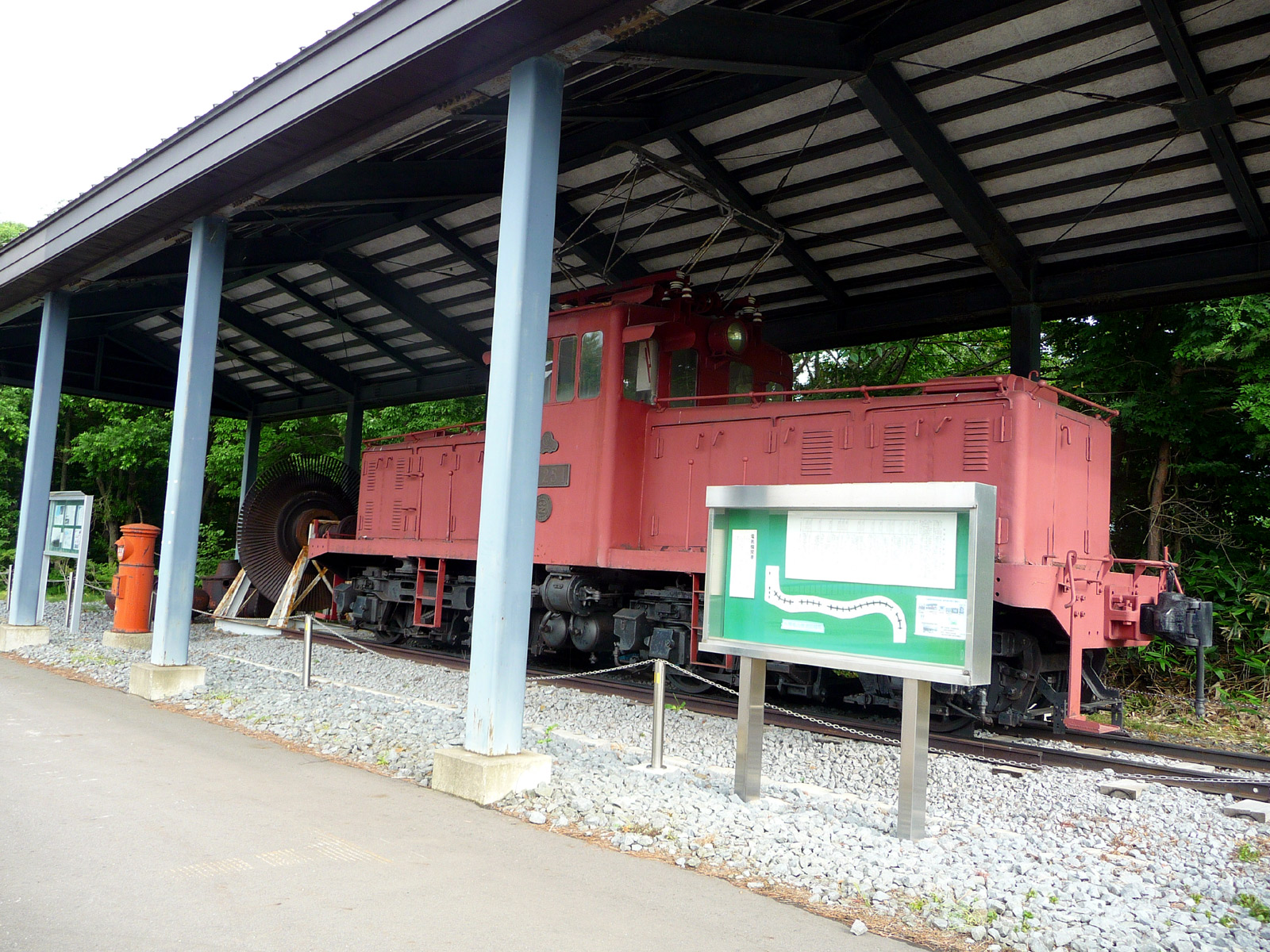
Abandoned railway
