= Mount Yakeishi =

Mountain on the island of Honshu, Japan

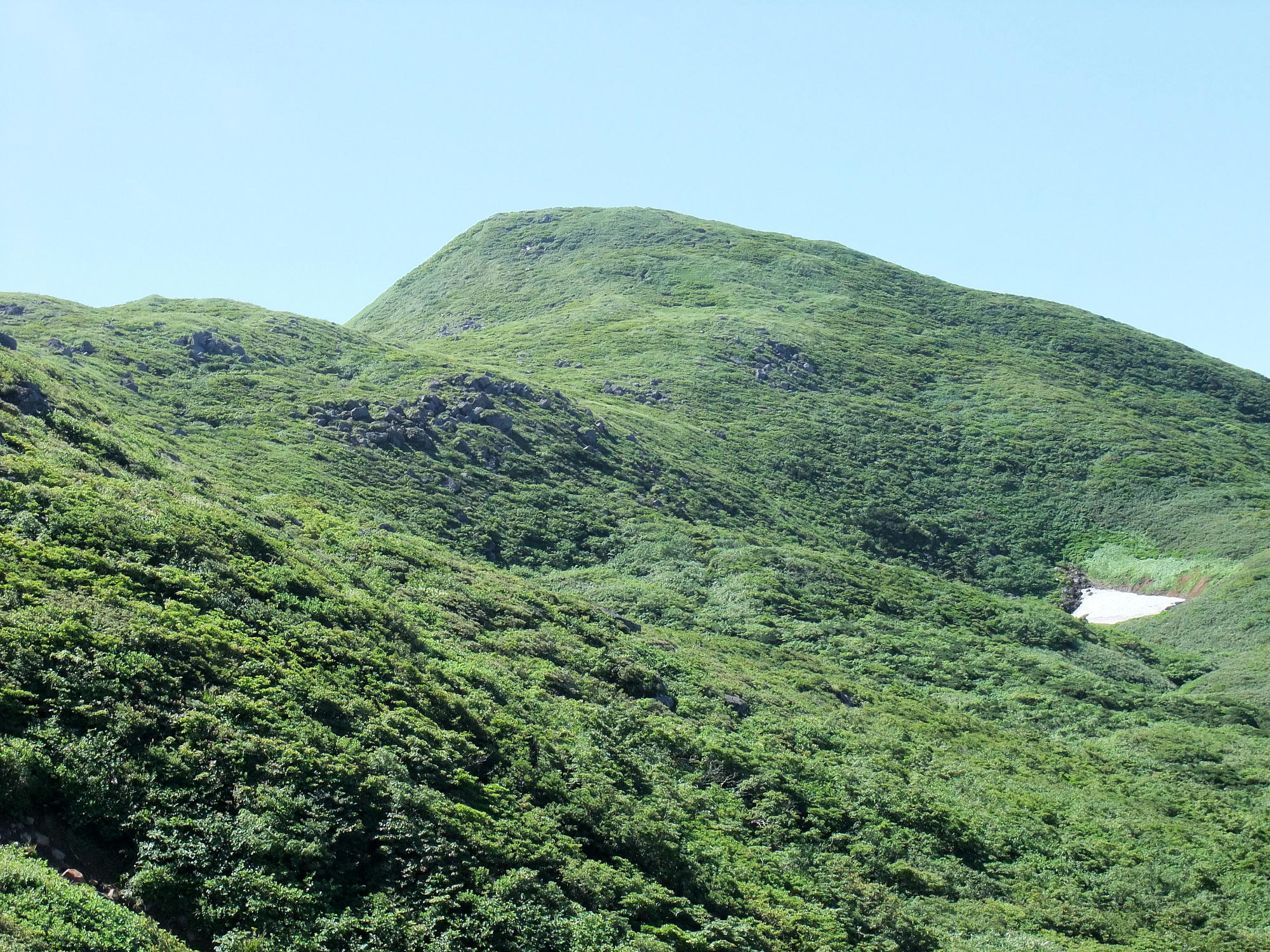

Highest point
- Elevation: 1,548 m (5,079 ft)
- Coordinates: 39°09′50″N 140°49′40.5″E

Geography
- Location within Japan
- Location: Honshu, Japan
- Parent range: Ōu Mountains

Mount Yakeishi (jp: 焼石岳) is a mountain in the Ōu Mountains on Honshu, the largest of the four main islands of Japan. The mountain, which rises to a height of 1,548 meters, is part of Kurikoma Quasi-National Park.

== See also ==
- List of mountains in Japan
- List of volcanoes in Japan
