= Fudō Falls =

- Location within Iwate Prefecture Location within Japan
- Location: Hachimantai, Iwate Prefecture, Japan
- Coordinates: 40°3′52.1″N 141°3′38.3″E
- Type: Multi-step
- Total height: 15 m (49 ft)
- Number of drops: 1
- Watercourse: Api River

Fudō Falls (不動の滝, Fudō-no-taki) is a waterfall in the city of Hachimantai, Iwate Prefecture, Japan, on a branch of the Api River.

It is one of "Japan’s Top 100 Waterfalls", per a listing published by the Japanese National Council of Forests, Waterfalls, and Beaches of Japan in 1991.

== See also ==
- List of waterfalls
