= Towada-Hachimantai National Park =

National Park in Tōhoku, Japan

- 十和田八幡平国立公園
- IUCN category II (national park)
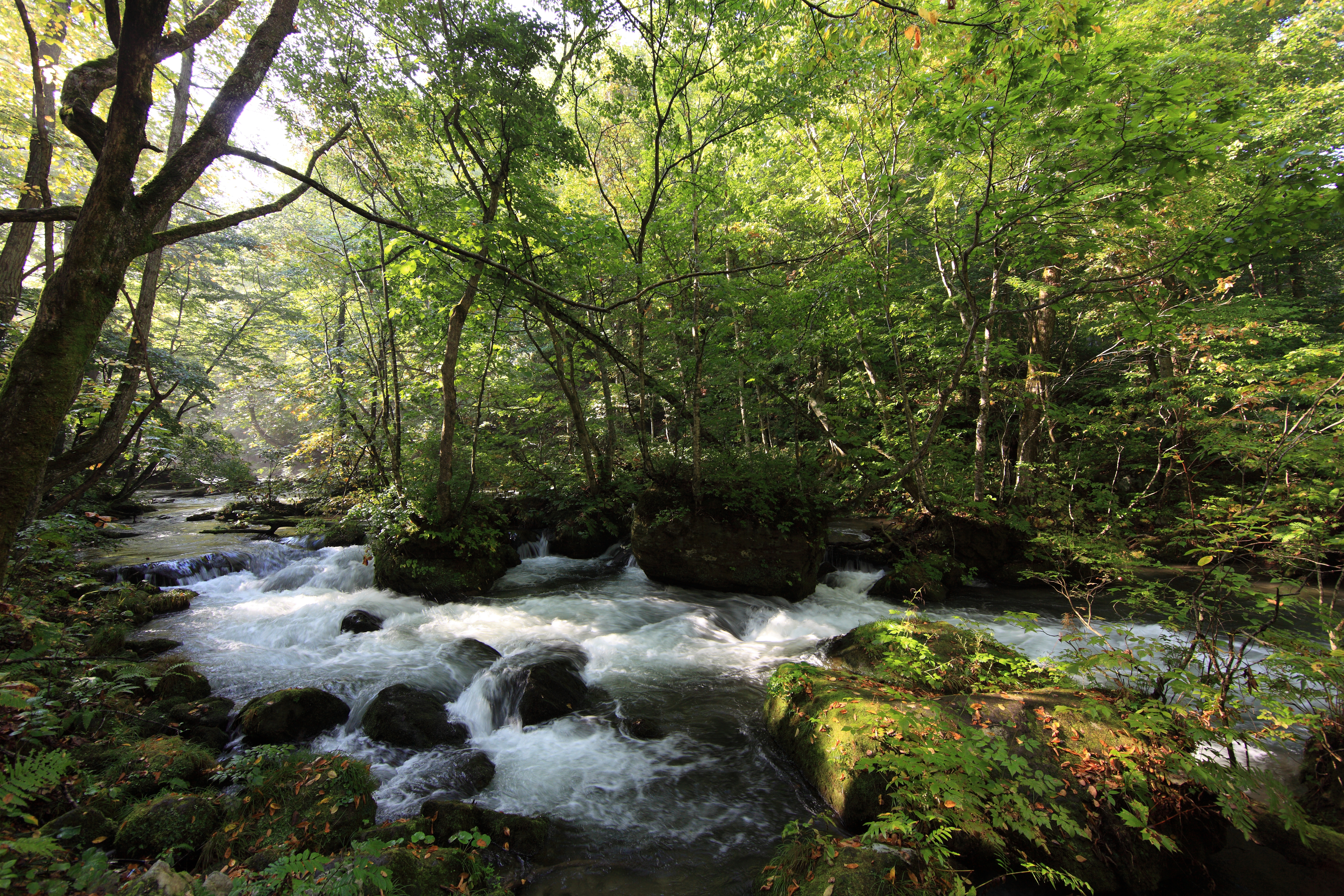
- Oirase River

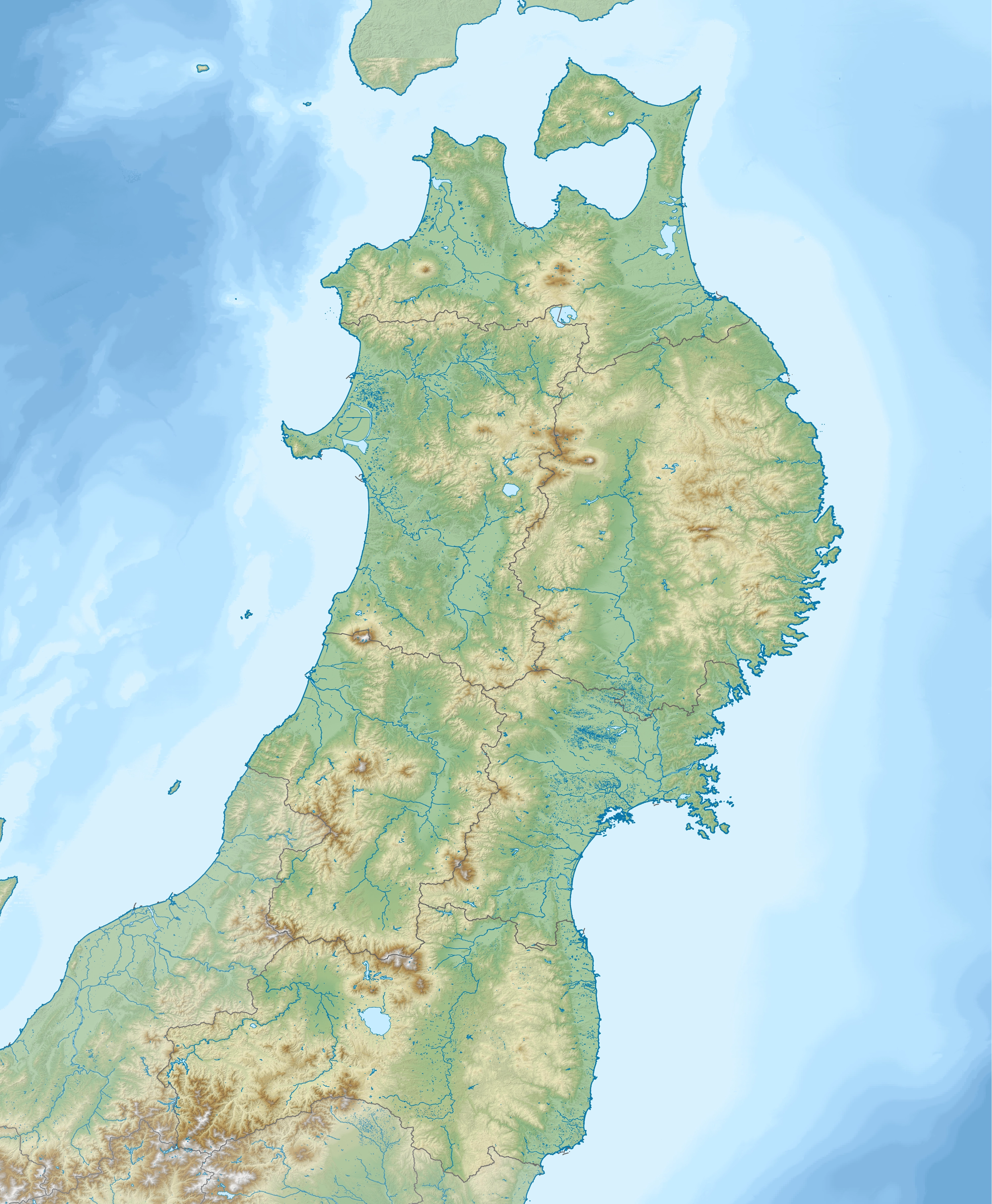
- Location within Tohoku, Japan Location within Japan
- Location: Tōhoku, Japan
- Coordinates: 40°43′59.88″N 140°43′1.2″E
- Area: 855.34 km^{2} (330.25 sq mi)
- Established: 1 February 1936
- Governing body: Ministry of the Environment (Japan)

Towada-Hachimantai National Park (十和田八幡平国立公園, Towada-Hachimantai Kokuritsu Kōen) is a national park comprising two separate areas of Aomori, Iwate, and Akita Prefectures, Japan. The Towada-Hakkōda area encompasses Lake Towada, Mount Hakkōda, and most of the Oirase River valley. The Hachimantai area includes Mount Hachimantai, Mount Iwate, Tamagawa Onsen, and Akita Komagatake (秋田駒ヶ岳). The two areas are 50 kilometres (31 mi) apart, and cover 854 square kilometres (330 mi^{2}).

== Related municipalities ==
- Aomori: Aomori, Hirakawa, Kuroishi, Towada
- Iwate: Hachimantai, Shizukuishi, Takizawa
- Akita: Kazuno, Kosaka, Semboku

== See also ==
- List of national parks of Japan
