= Mount Iwate =

Stratovolcano complex on Honshu, Japan

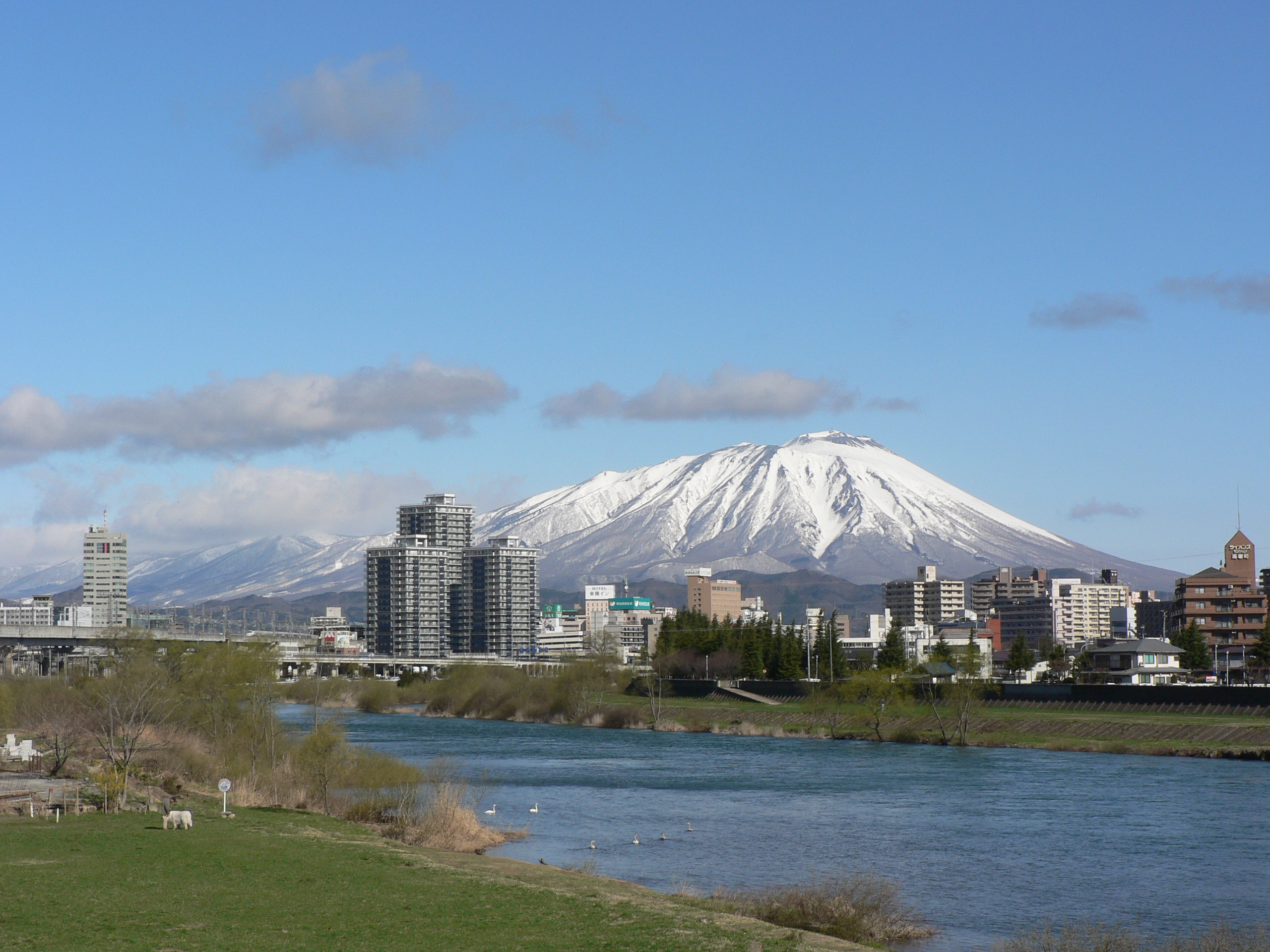
- Mount Iwate from the city of Morioka

Highest point
- Elevation: 2,038 m (6,686 ft)
- Prominence: 1,745 m (5,725 ft)
- Listing: 100 Famous Mountains of Japan; Ultra, Ribu
- Coordinates: 39°51′12″N 141°00′03″E

Naming
- Native name: 岩手山 (Japanese)

Geography
- Location within Iwate Prefecture Location within Japan
- Location: Iwate Prefecture, Japan
- Parent range: Ōu Mountains

Geology
- Mountain type: Stratovolcano complex
- Volcanic arc: Northeastern Japan Arc
- Last eruption: July 1919

Mount Iwate (岩手山, Iwate-san; Japanese pronunciation: [í.β̞ä̀.tè̞, ì.β̞ä́.té̞.sä̀ɴ̀]) is a stratovolcano complex in the Ōu Mountains of western Iwate Prefecture, in the Tōhoku region of northern Honshū, Japan. With an elevation of 2,038 metres (6,686 ft), it is the highest in Iwate Prefecture. It is included as one of the 100 famous mountains in Japan, a book composed in 1964 by mountaineer and author Kyūya Fukada. The mountain is on the borders of the municipalities of Hachimantai, Takizawa, and Shizukuishi, west of the prefectural capital of Morioka. Much of the mountain is within the borders of the Towada-Hachimantai National Park. The mountain is also referred to as the "Nanbu Fuji" for its resemblance to Mount Fuji.

== Geology ==
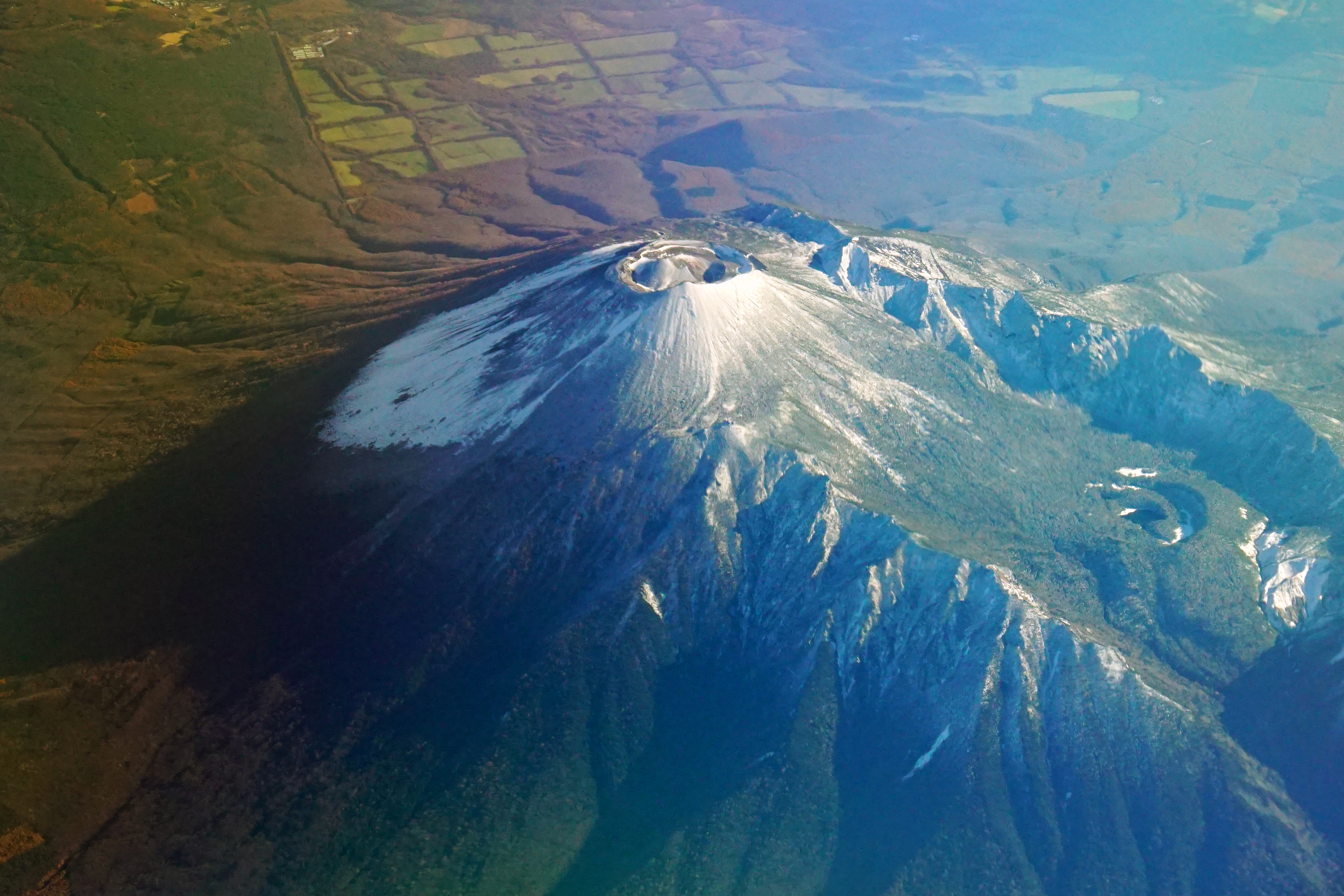
Aerial photographs of Mount Iwate from the NNW

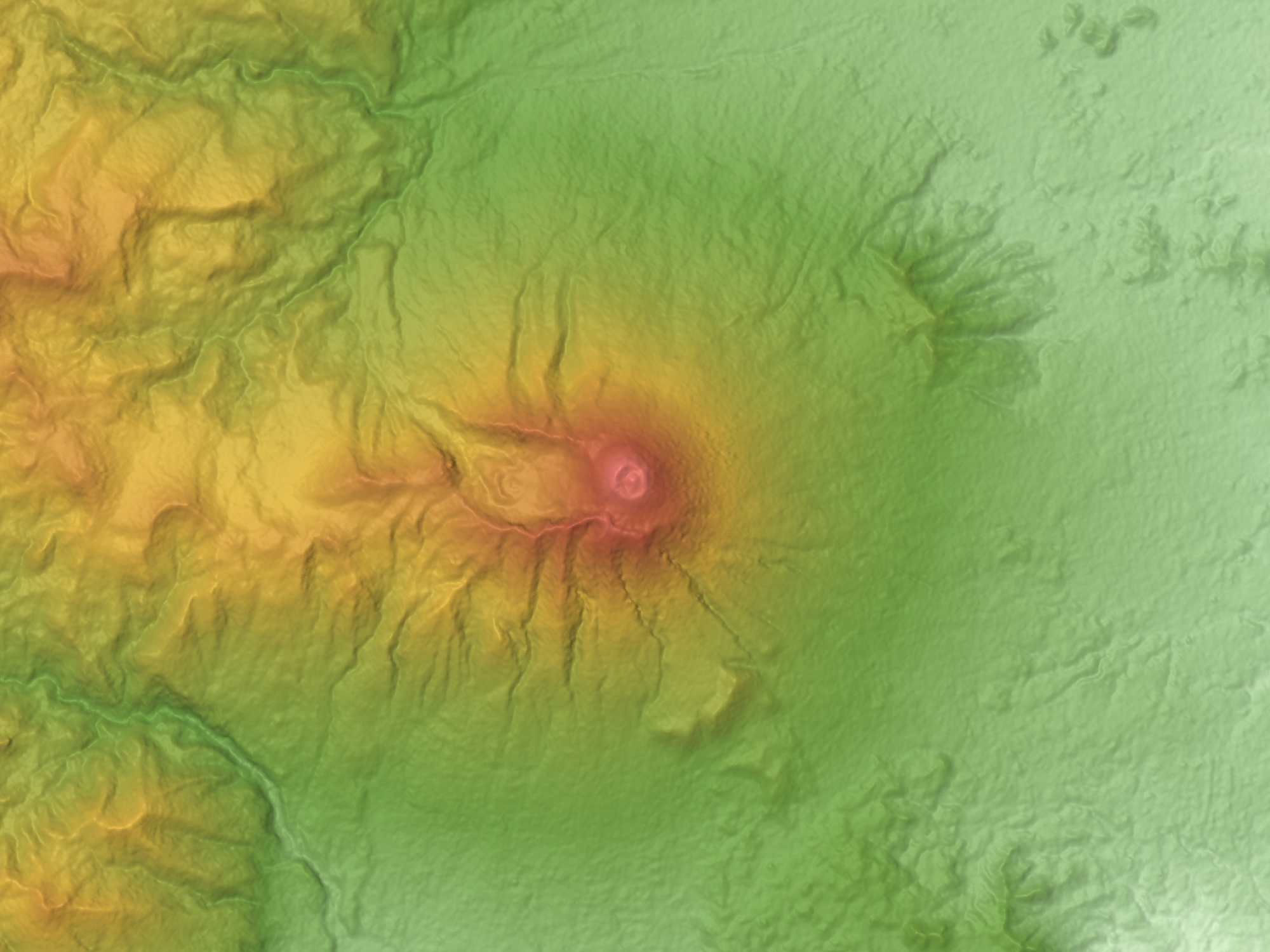
Relief Map

Mount Iwate consists of a younger eastern symmetrical stratovolcano (Higashi-Iwate, "East Iwate") overlapping an older western stratovolcano (Nishi-Iwate, "West Iwate") which has collapsed to form a caldera. Nishi-Iwate was formed approximately 700,000 years ago, and forms two-thirds of the mountain body. Higashi-Iwate was a later (300,000 years ago) parasitic volcano, which now forms the summit of the mountain. The oval-shaped, 1.8 x 3 km caldera of Nishi-Iwate has a 0.5 km wide crater, partially filled by a crater lake called Lake Onawashiro. Several somma including Yakushidake, the largest, surround the more recent Higashi Iwate crater rim.

During the historical period, Mount Iwate erupted in 1686-1687 with a pyroclastic surge; however, the eruption of 1732 was much larger and resulted in a substantial lava flow on the northeast slopes of the mountain. This four-kilometre long lava flow ("Yakebashiri Lava Flow") has been designated a Natural Monument by the Japanese government. Mount Iwate has largely been quiet since 1732, with a small emission of steam and ash in 1919 and a series of volcanic earthquakes from 1998 to 2003.

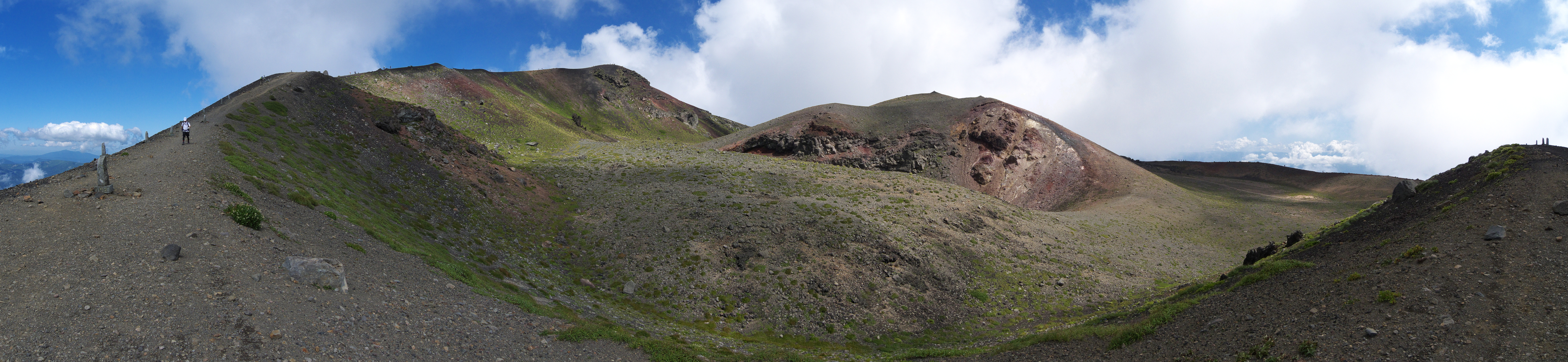
Summit crater of the Mount Iwate

== See also ==
- List of Ultras of Japan
- List of volcanoes in Japan
- List of mountains in Japan
