= Ōu Mountains =

Mountain range in Honshu, Japan

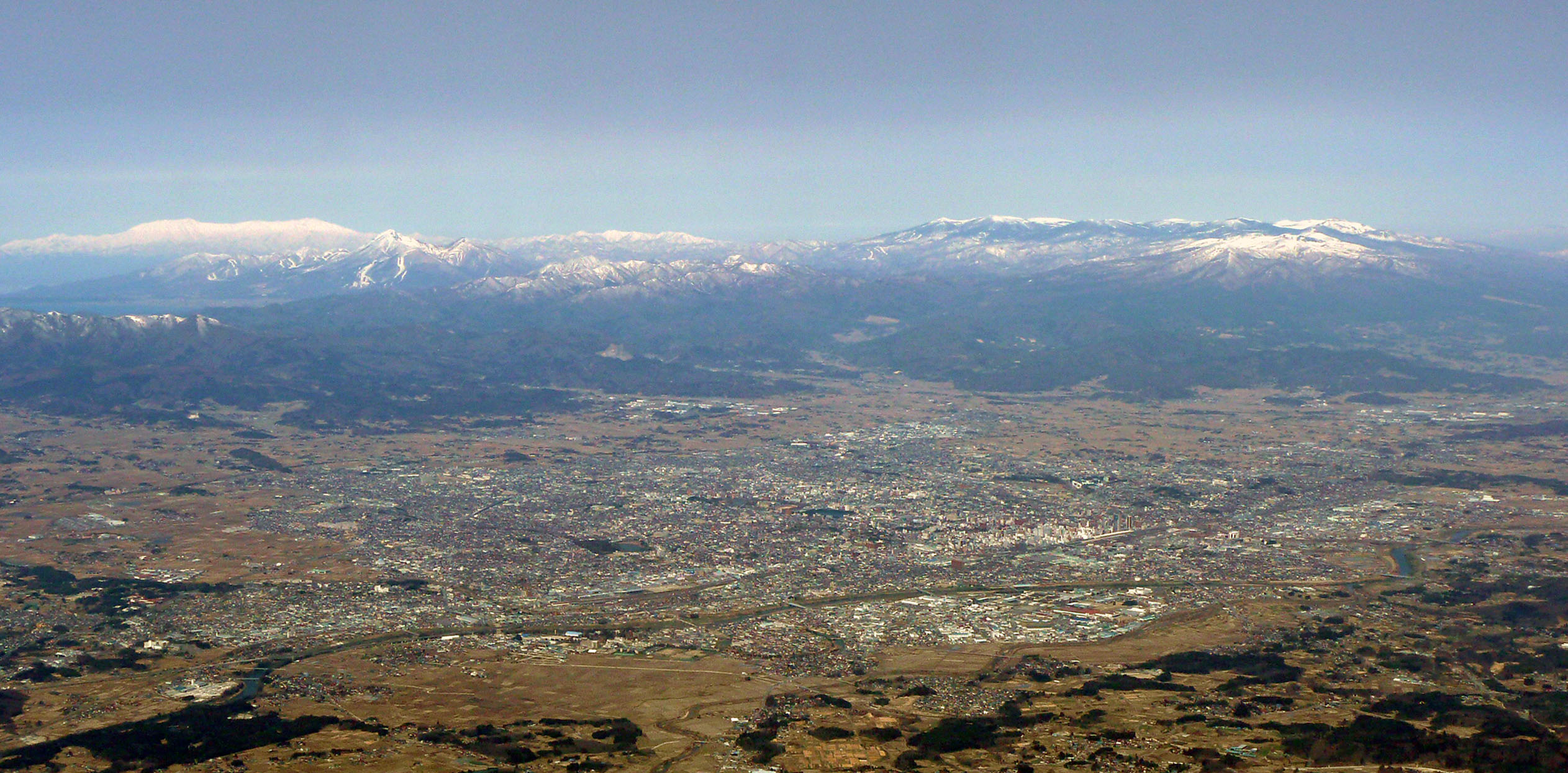
- A section of the Ōu Mountains near Kōriyama, Fukushima

Highest point
- Peak: Mount Iwate, Iwate Prefecture
- Elevation: 2,038 m (6,686 ft)

Dimensions
- Length: 500 km (310 mi) North-South
- Width: 35 km (22 mi) East-West

Naming
- Native name: 奥羽山脈 (Japanese); Ōu-sanmyaku (Japanese)

Geography
- Country: Japan
- States: Aomori Prefecture; Akita Prefecture; Fukushima Prefecture; Iwate Prefecture; Miyagi Prefecture; Yamagata Prefecture
- Region: Tōhoku
- Range coordinates: 39°51.15′N 141°0.05′E

Geology
- Orogeny: Island arc
- Rock type: Volcanic

The Ōu Mountains (奥羽山脈, Ōu-sanmyaku) are a mountain range in the Tōhoku region of Honshū, Japan. It is the longest range in Japan and stretches 500 km (311 mi) south from the Natsudomari Peninsula of Aomori Prefecture to the Nasu volcanoes at the northern boundary of the Kantō region. Though long, the range is only about 35 kilometres (22 mi) wide. The highest point in the range is Mount Iwate, 2,038 metres (6,686 ft).

The range includes several widely known mountains: Hakkōda Mountains, Mount Iwate, Mount Zaō, Mount Azuma, Mount Yakeishi, and Mount Adatara.

== Naming ==
These mountains previously formed the boundary between historical provinces of Mutsu (陸奥国) and Dewa (出羽国). The kanji for the name of the mountain range was created from one kanji of the two provinces, 奥 and 羽, respectively.

== Geology ==
The Ōu Mountains began to form in the Pliocene. They sit over the middle of the inner arc of the Northeastern Japan Arc. This is the result of the Pacific plate subducting under the Okhotsk plate. A chain of Quaternary volcanoes along the range forms the volcanic front.
