= Japan National Route 340 =

National highway in Japan

National Route 340
- 国道340号
- Japan National Route 340 highlighted in red
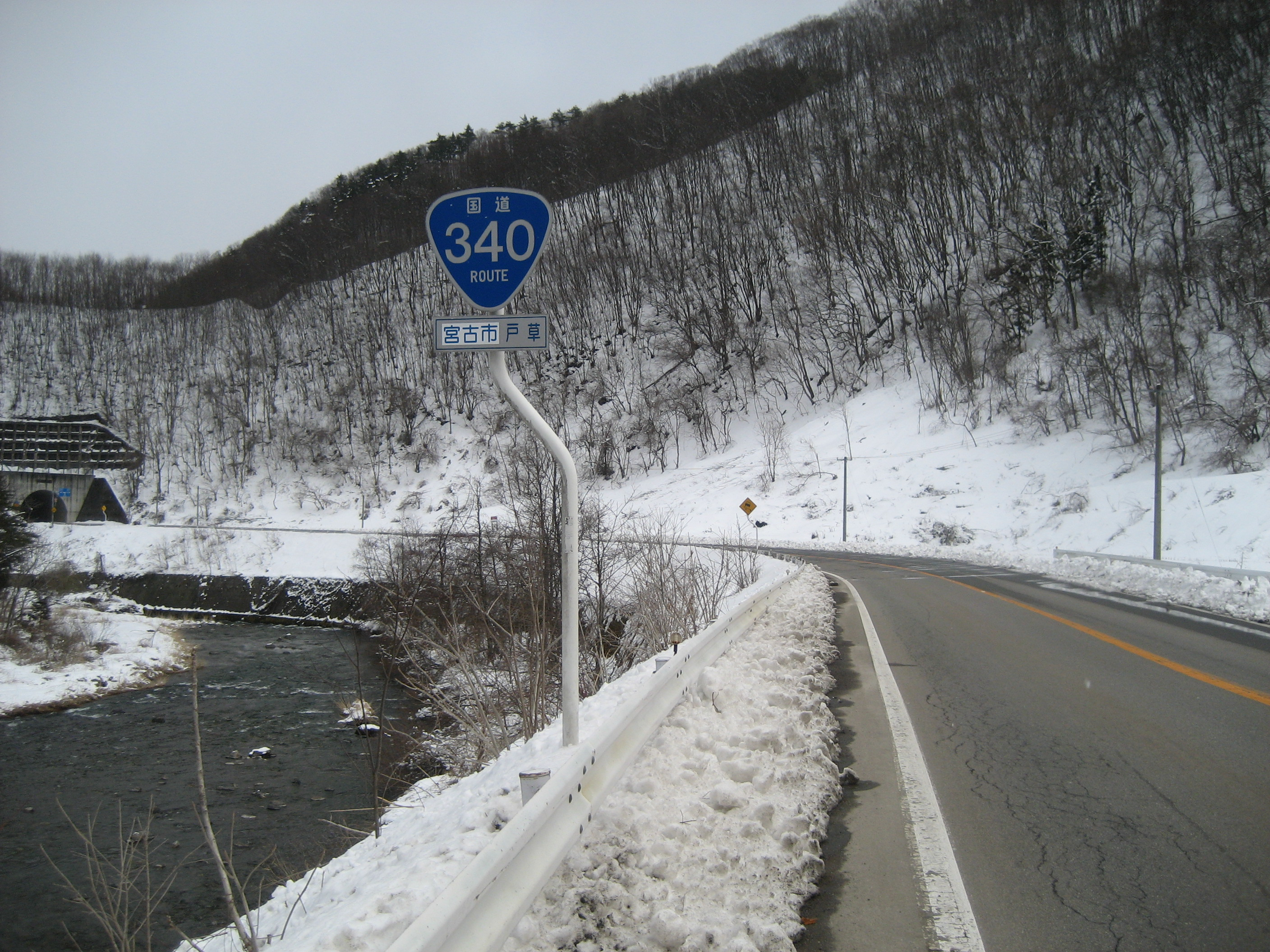

Route information
- Length: 246.2 km (153.0 mi)
- Existed: 1 April 1975–present

Major junctions
- South end: National Route 45 in Rikuzentakata, Iwate
- North end: National Route 45 in Hachinohe, Aomori

Location
- Country: Japan

Highway system
- National highways of Japan; Expressways of Japan
← National Route 339	→ National Route 341

National Route 340 (国道340号, Kokudō Sanbyakuyonjūgō) is a national highway of Japan connecting the cities of Rikuzentakata, in southeastern Iwate Prefecture, and Hachinohe, in southeastern Aomori Prefecture. It travels south to north and has a total length of 246.2 kilometers (153.0 mi). It serves primarily as an alternate, inland route to National Route 45 through the northeastern part of the Tōhoku region.

== Route description ==
National Route 340 has a total length of 246.2 kilometers (153.0 mi).

== History ==
National Route 340 was established by the Cabinet of Japan in 1975 between Rikuzentaka and Hachinohe.

== Major intersections ==
All junctions listed are at-grade intersections unless noted otherwise.

Prefecture	Location	km	mi	Destinations	Notes
Iwate	Rikuzentakata	0.0	0.0	National Route 45 (Rikuzentakata Bypass) – Kamaishi, Ōfunato, Ishinomaki, Kesennuma	Southern terminus of national routes 340 and 343
Iwate	Rikuzentakata	1.7	1.1	Iwate Prefecture Route 141 east	Intersection is closed due to post-2011 Tōhoku earthquake and tsunami reconstruction work
Iwate	Rikuzentakata	2.7	1.7	Sanriku Expressway – Sendai, Kesennuma, Miyako, Kamaishi	Rikuzentakata Interchange (E45 exit 31)
Iwate	Rikuzentakata	4.9	3.0	National Route 343 west – Ōshū, Ichinoseki	Northern end of unsigned National Route 343 concurrency
Iwate	Sumita	17.8	11.1	National Route 107 east – Kamaishi, Ōfunato, Morioka, Kitakami, Tōno	Southern end of National Route 107 concurrency
Iwate	Sumita	21.9	13.6	National Route 107 west – Morioka, Kitakami, Ōshū	Northern end of National Route 107 concurrency
Iwate	Sumita	27.4	17.0	Iwate Prefecture Route 238 north	
Iwate	Sumita	29.9	18.6	Iwate Prefecture Route 167 east	
Iwate	Tōno	38.2	23.7	Kamaishi Expressway / National Route 283 east – Kamaishi	Tōno-Sumita Interchange (E46 exit 6); southern end of National Route 283 concurrency
Iwate	Tōno	41.7	25.9	National Route 283 east	Eastbound National Route 283 pedestrian, bicycle, or motorized traffic with engine displacement below 125cc traffic must use this road
Iwate	Tōno	45.6	28.3	Iwate Prefecture Route 35 east – to National Route 45, Unosumai, Hashino iron mining and smelting site	
Iwate	Tōno	48.4	30.1	National Route 283 west (Tōno Bypass)	Northern end of National Route 283 concurrency
Iwate	Tōno	51.8	32.2	Iwate Prefecture Route 160 west – Tsukimōshi	
Iwate	Miyako	70.9	44.1	Iwate Prefecture Route 26 (former National Route 340) east – Ōtsuchi	
Iwate	Miyako	78.9	49.0	Iwate Prefecture Route 25 west – Shiwa	
Iwate	Miyako	86.0	53.4	National Route 106 west – Morioka	Southern end of National Route 106 concurrency
Iwate	Miyako	87.4	54.3	Iwate Prefecture Route 143 south – Rikuchū-Kawai Station	
Iwate	Miyako	101.5	63.1	National Route 106 east – Miyako	Northern end of National Route 106 concurrency
Iwate	Iwaizumi	129.6	80.5	Iwate Prefecture Route 171 west – Okawa, Kamatsuda	
Iwate	Iwaizumi	136.8	85.0	National Route 455 east – Ryūsendō, Iwaizumi	Southern end of National Route 455 concurrency
Iwate	Iwaizumi	147.7	91.8	National Route 455 west – Morioka	Northern end of National Route 455 concurrency
Iwate	Kuzumaki	160.9	100.0	Iwate Prefecture Route 202 east – Fudai, Akka	
Iwate	Kuzumaki	176.3	109.5	National Route 281 west – Morioka, Iwate Town	Southern end of National Route 281 concurrency
Iwate	Kuzumaki	177.3	110.2	National Route 281 east – Kuji	Northern end of National Route 281 concurrency
Iwate	Kunohe	190.7	118.5	Iwate Prefecture Route 271 west – Anetai	
Iwate	Kunohe	190.9	118.6	Iwate Prefecture Route 272 east – Nikarube	
Iwate	Kunohe	196.9	122.3	Iwate Prefecture Route 5 east – Yamagata	Southern end of Iwate Prefecture Route 5 concurrency
Iwate	Kunohe	199.8	124.1	Iwate Prefecture Route 5 west – Ichinohe	Northern end of Iwate Prefecture Route 5 concurrency
Iwate	Kunohe	200.5	124.6	Iwate Prefecture Route 24 west – Ninohe	
Iwate	Kunohe	202.8	126.0	Hachinohe Expressway – Morioka, Hachinohe; Iwate Prefecture Route 22 (Karumai Kunohe Route) east – Taneichi, Kuji, Yamagata	Kunohe Interchange (E4A exit 3)
Iwate	Karumai	209.4	130.1	Iwate Prefecture Route 264 (Ninohe Karumai Route) – Natsumagi, Kiminarita	
Iwate	Karumai	212.4	132.0	National Route 395 west – Ninohe	Southern end of National Route 395 concurrency
Iwate	Karumai	217.0	134.8	Iwate Prefecture Route 33 north – Hachinohe, Nagawa	
Iwate	Karumai	221.2	137.4	Hachinohe Expressway – Morioka, Hachinohe, Misawa; Iwate Prefecture Route 264 (Ninohe Karumai Route) south – Central Karumai	Karumai Interchange (E4A exit 4)
Iwate	Karumai	221.3	137.5	National Route 395 east – Kuji, Ōno	Northern end of National Route 395 concurrency
Aomori	Hachinohe	231.3	143.7	Aomori Prefecture Route 42 – Nanbu, Hashikami, Hachinohe Expressway	
Aomori	Hachinohe	242.4	150.6	Aomori Prefecture Route 29 (Hachinohe Belt Highway) – Hachinohe Station, Hashikami, Kuji, Hachinohe Expressway, Hachinohe-Kuji Expressway	
Aomori	Hachinohe	244.4	151.9	National Route 340 south	Western end of southbound side of National Route 340 one-way pair
Aomori	Hachinohe	244.5	151.9	National Route 340 north Aomori Prefecture Route 251 west – to National Route 104	Western end of northbound side of National Route 340 one-way pair
Aomori	Hachinohe	246.2	153.0	National Route 45 (Hachinohe Bypass) – Towada, Kuji; Aomori Prefecture Route 1 east –Kabushima, Tanesashi Seaside	Northern terminus; eastern end of National Route 340 one-way pair; northbound traffic continues as Aomori Prefecture Route 1 east
1.000 mi = 1.609 km; 1.000 km = 0.621 mi: Closed/former; Concurrency terminus
