= Hachinohe-Kuji Expressway =

Expressway in Aomori and Iwate Prefectures, Japan

Hachinohe-Kuji Expressway
- 八戸久慈自動車道

Route information
- Maintained by Ministry of Land, Infrastructure, Transport and Tourism
- Length: 50.9 km (31.6 mi)
- Existed: 1993–present
- Component highways: National Route 45

Major junctions
- North end: Hachinohe Junction; Hachinohe Expressway in Hachinohe
- South end: Kuji Interchange; National Route 45; National Route 395 in Kuji, Iwate

Location
- Country: Japan

Highway system
- National highways of Japan; Expressways of Japan

The Hachinohe-Kuji Expressway (八戸久慈自動車道, Hachinohe-Kuji Jidōsha-dō) is an incompleted expressway in the southeastern part of Aomori Prefecture and the coastal area of Iwate Prefecture in northern Japan. It is owned and operated primarily by the Ministry of Land, Infrastructure, Transport and Tourism (MLIT), but has a section maintained by the East Nippon Expressway Company. The route is signed as an auxiliary route of National Route 45 as well E45 under MLIT's "2016 Proposal for Realization of Expressway Numbering."

== Route description ==
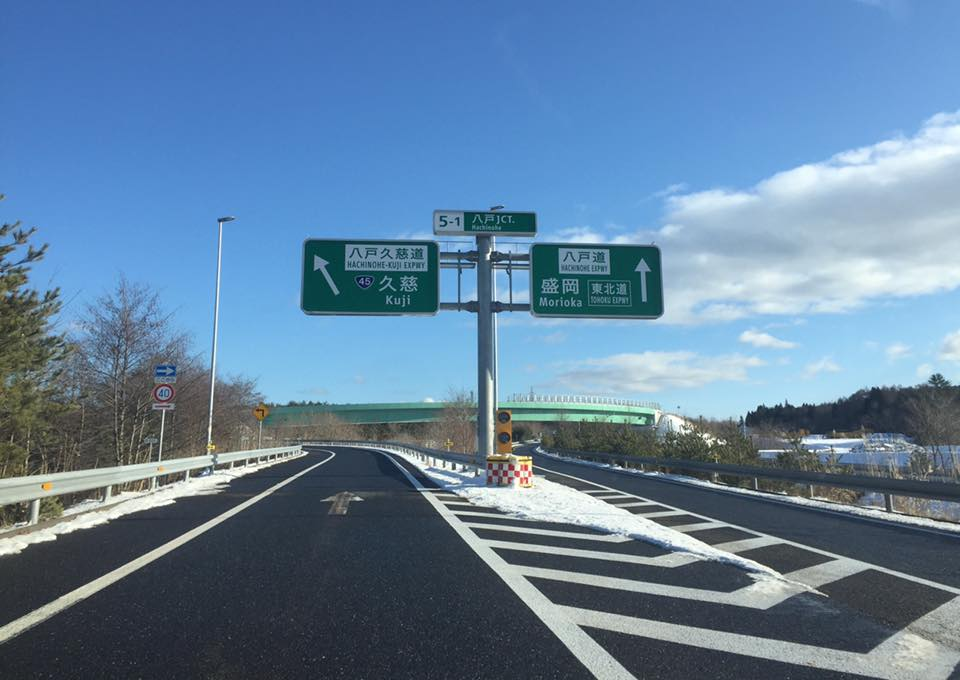
The northern terminus of the expressway, Hachinohe Junction.

As of June 2020, the expressway consists of two sections, one that bypasses the central part of Hachinohe, Aomori and the other travels north from the central part of Kuji, Iwate.

=== Hachinohe section ===
The northern terminus of the expressway is at Hachinohe Junction, where the route meets the branch route of the Hachinohe Expressway. Near this junction, drivers pass through a toll booth that collects fees based on the distance traveled on the Hachinohe Expressway. From this point, tolls are not incurred for driving on the Hachinohe-Kuji Expressway. Just beyond the toll booth the expressway crosses over the main line of the Hachinohe Expressway. There is no direct access from the Hachinohe-Kuji expressway to the northern terminus of the main line of the Hachinohe Expressway at Hachinohe Interchange. The Hachinohe-Kuji Expressway curves northeast, tunneling below Japan National Route 340. Upon emerging from this tunnel, named Korekawa, the expressway curves back to the east. The route then crosses the Niida River and immediately after has a junction with Aomori Prefecture Route 11 (Kuji Highway). After this, the expressway continues gentling winding in generally in an easterly direction. It then meets Japan National Route 45 at a junction. Curving to the southeast, the two routes parallel one another with Route 45 only a few hundred meters to the west of the expressway. The expressway has one more junction that provides access to scenic spots along the Tanesashi Coast. After this junction the expressway meets Route 45 once more at Hashikami Interchange. This point of is the southern terminus of this section of the expressway (as of January 2019).

=== Kuji section ===
This section of the expressway begins at an interchange with National Route 45 on the northern edge of Kuji. The entirety of the route closely parallels National Route 45 and later also National Route 395 as it travels south towards the center of Kuji. The expressway is further inland than National Route 395, tunneling through hills to bypass the built-up areas surrounding the parallel route. The route crosses over the Hachinohe Line before meeting its southern terminus at Kuji Interchange. This is also the southern terminus of the expressway.

== History ==
The Hachinihe-Kuji Expressway has been constructed in several stages. The first one to open in 1993, is the section between Kuji and Kuji-kita interchanges in Kuji. The other sections in Aomori Prefecture were opened between 2013 and 2014. A second section in Kuji opened on 1 March 2020.

== Junction list ==
Distance posts on the Kuji section follow the sequence of those along Route 45, not the expressway.

Prefecture	Location	km	mi	Exit	Name	Destinations	Notes
Aomori	Hachinohe	0	0.0	5-1/TB	Hachinohe	Hachinohe Expressway (spur route) – Misawa, Morioka	Northern terminus of E45; no access to Hachinohe IC
Aomori	Hachinohe	4.8	3.0	75	Hachinohe-Korekawa	Aomori Prefecture Route 11 (Kuji Highway) – Central Hachinohe, Karumai, Iwate	
Aomori	Hachinohe	8.6	5.3	74	Hachinohe-minami	National Route 45 – Central Hachinohe, Kuji, Iwate	
Aomori	Hashikami	12.0	7.5	73	Tanesashikaigan-Hashikamidake	Tanesashi Coast-Mt. Hashikami Road – to National Route 45, Tanesashi Kaigan Hashikamidake Prefectural Natural Park	
Aomori	Hashikami	17.3	10.7	72	Hashikami	National Route 45 – Hachinohe, Kuji	
Iwate	Kuji	24.3	15.1	71	Hirono-Taneichi	Iwate Prefectural Road 20 (Karumai Taneichi Road)	Northbound entrance, Southbound exit
Iwate	Kuji	31.1	19.3	70	Hirono-Shukunohe	National Route 45	Northbound entrance, Southbound exit
Iwate	Kuji	35.3	21.9	69	Hirono-Uge	National Route 45	Northbound exit, Southbound entrance
Iwate	Kuji	40.3	25.0	68	Samuraihama	National Route 45 – Samuraihama, Hachinohe, Miyako	
Iwate	Kuji	42.7	26.5	67	Samuraihama-minami	National Route 45	Northbound exit, southbound entrance
Iwate	Kuji	47.7	29.6	66	Kuji-kita	National Route 45 / National Route 395 – Ninohe, Hachinohe	
Iwate	Kuji	50.9	31.6	65	Kuji	National Route 395 – Ninohe, Central Kuji; Sanriku-kita Jūkan Road south	E45 continues south as the Sanriku-kita Jūkan Road
1.000 mi = 1.609 km; 1.000 km = 0.621 mi: Electronic toll collection; Incomplete access; Route transition; Unopened
