= Japan National Route 45 =

National highway in the Tōhoku region of Japan

National Route 45
- 国道45号
- Japan National Route 45 highlighted in red

Route information
- Length: 516.9 km (321.2 mi)
- Existed: 1 April 1963–present

Major junctions
- North end: National Route 7 / National Route 101 / National Route 280 in Aomori
- National Route 279 (Shimokita Expressway); National Route 4; Momoishi Toll Road/Daini Michinoku Toll Road; Hachinohe Expressway; Hachinohe-Kuji Expressway; Sanriku-kita Jūkan Road; Sanriku Expressway; Sanriku Expressway/Sendai-Tōbu Road; National Route 4
- South end: National Route 48 / National Route 286 in Sendai

Location
- Country: Japan

Highway system
- National highways of Japan; Expressways of Japan
← National Route 44	→ National Route 46

National Route 45 (国道45号, Kokudō Shijūgogō) is a national highway of Japan connecting Aoba-ku, Sendai and Aomori. Alongside Japan National Route 6, it is a main route along the Pacific coast of eastern Japan. It is paralleled closely by the incomplete Sanriku Expressway between Sendai and Hachinohe.

== Route description ==
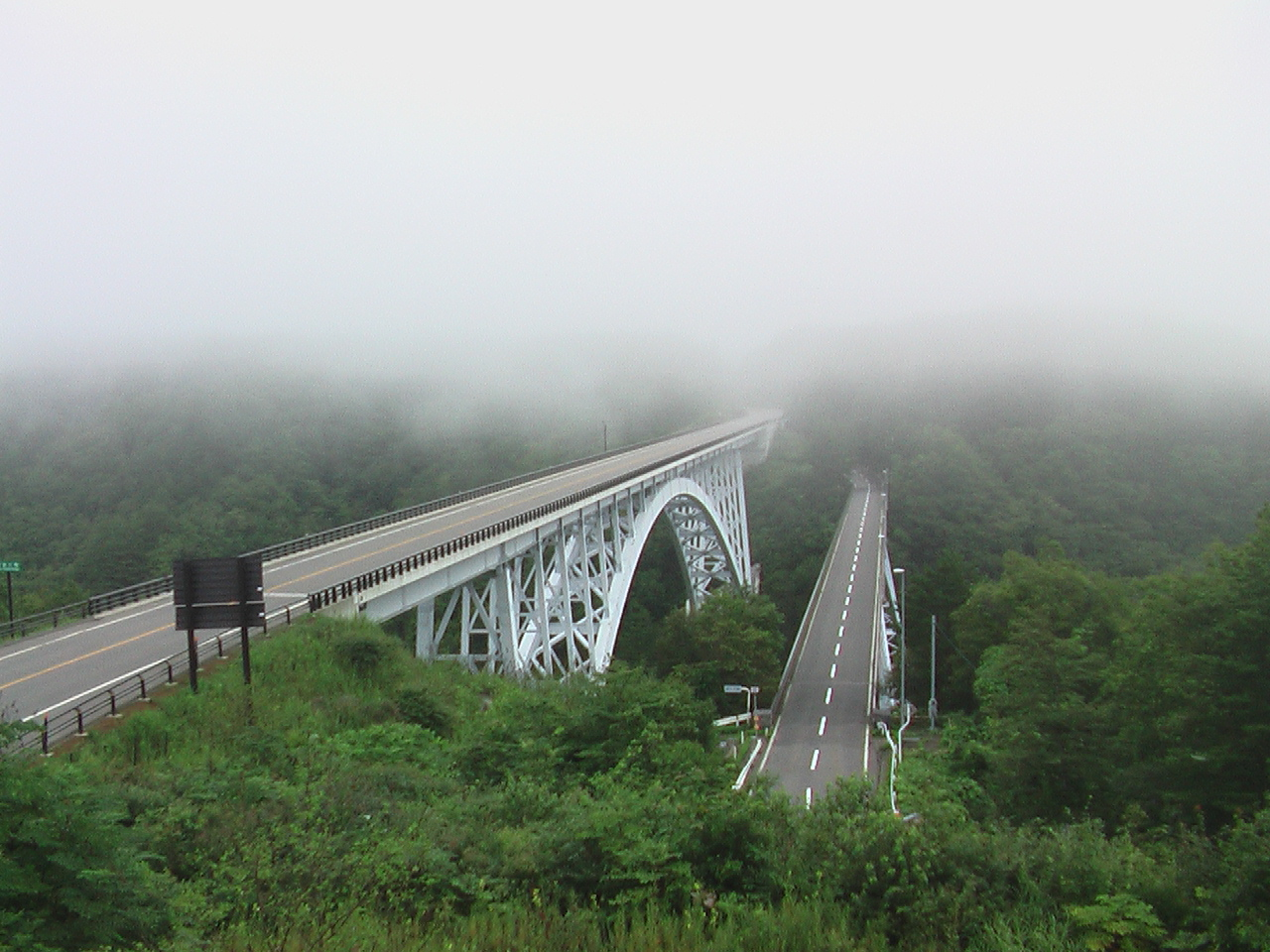
National Route 45 crossing over the Shiino Bridge in Tanohata, Iwate

National Route 45 has a total length of 516.9 kilometers (321.2 mi). The northernmost 76.1 kilometers (47.3 mi) of the highway between its northern terminus in central Aomori and Japan National Route 102 in Towada is a concurrency with Japan National Route 4 where Route 45 is not signed until it diverges from Route 4. From there it independently begins heading southeast towards the coastal cities of Hachinohe, Kuji, Miyako, Kamaishi, Kesennuma, and Ishinomaki on the way to its southern terminus in Sendai.

== History ==
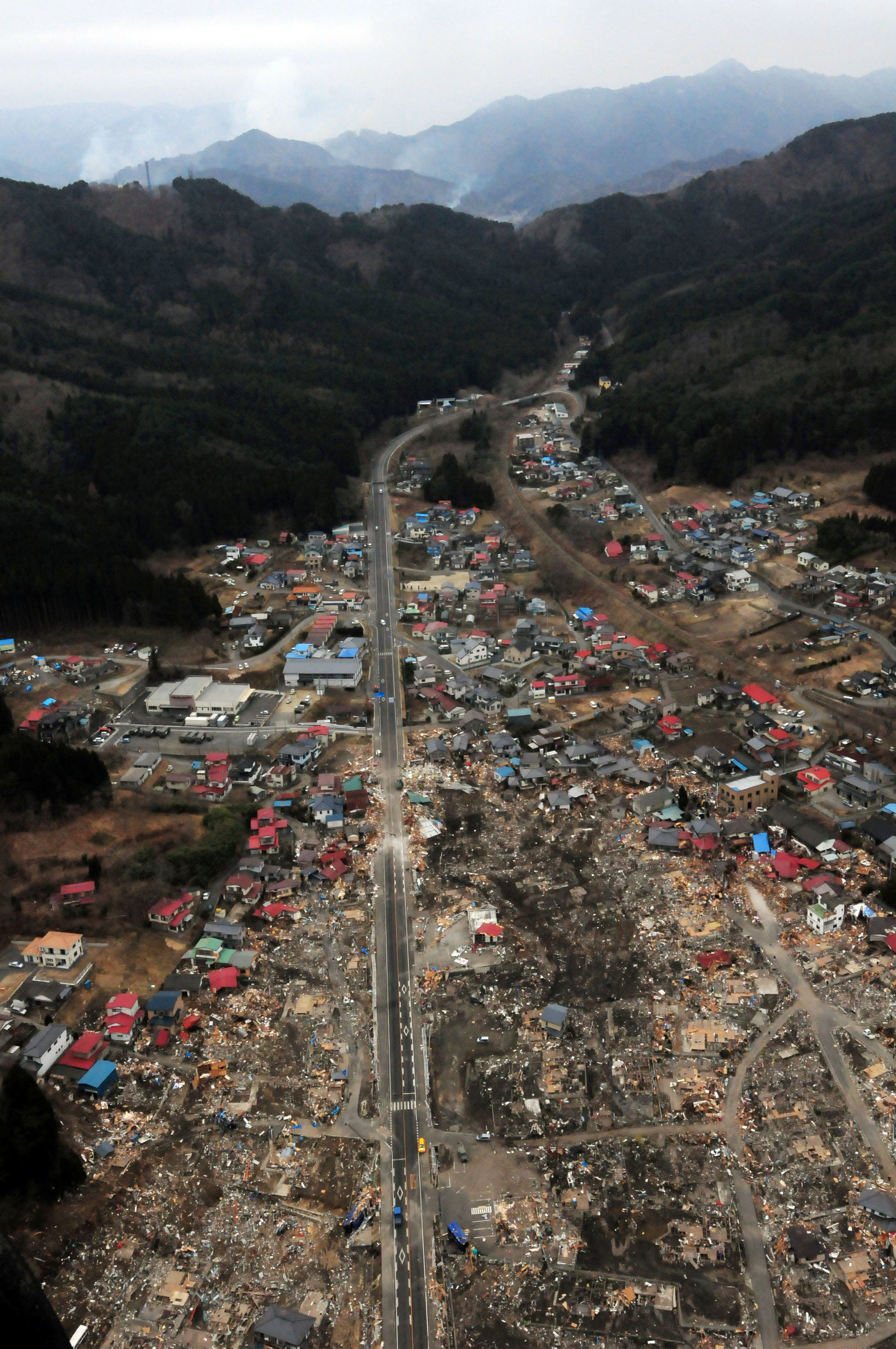
An aerial view of damage to Ōtsuchi, Iwate and Route 45 after the 9.0 magnitude earthquake and subsequent tsunami devastated the area

Route 45 was originally designated on 18 May 1953 as second-class routes 102 and 111 connecting Hirosaki to Hachinohe and Hachinohe to Sendai, respectively. On 1 April 1963, Route 102 was truncated to its current route with the section between Towada and Hachinohe incorporated into the newly formed first-class Route 45 along with the entirety of Route 111.

Many sections of the highway along the Sanriku Coast were inundated, destroyed, or swept away by the 2011 Tōhoku earthquake and tsunami.

== List of major junctions ==
Aomori Prefecture
National Route 7 (Aomori West Bypass) / National Route 101 / National Route 280 in Aomori (northern end of concurrency with National Route 4)
National Route 103 in Aomori
National Route 7 in Aomori
National Route 279 in Noheji
National Route 279 (Shimokita Expressway) (Noheji Interchange) in Noheji
National Route 394 in Shichinohe
National Route 4 in Towada (southern end of concurrency with National Route 4)
National Route 102 in Towada
Momoishi Road/Daini Michinoku Toll Road (Shimoda-Momoishi Interchange) in Oirase
National Route 338 in Oirase
Hachinohe Expressway (Hachinohe-kita Interchange) in Hachinohe
National Route 104 in Hachinohe
National Route 340 in Hachinohe
Hachinohe-Kuji Expressway (Hachinohe-minami Interchange) in Hachinohe
Hachinohe-Kuji Expressway (Hashikami Interchange) in Hashikami
Iwate Prefecture
National Route 395/ Hachinohe-Kuji Expressway (Kuji-kita Interchange) in Kuji
National Route 395/ Hachinohe-Kuji Expressway/Sanriku-kita Jūkan Road (Kuji Interchange) in Kuji
National Route 281 in Kuji
Sanriku-kita Jūkan Road (Fudai-dai-16-Chiwari Interchange) in Fudai
Sanriku-kita Jūkan Road (Fudai-dai-11-Chiwari Interchange) in Fudai
Sanriku-kita Jūkan Road (Tanohata-Sugō Interchange) in Tanohata
Sanriku-kita Jūkan Road (Tanohata Interchange) in Tanohata
Sanriku-kita Jūkan Road (Tanohata-minami Interchange) in Tanohata
Sanriku-kita Jūkan Road (Unosudangai Interchange) in Tanohata
National Route 455 in Iwaizumi
Sanriku-kita Jūkan Road (Iwaizumi-minami Interchange) in Iwaizumi
Sanriku Expressway (Tarō-Masakikaigan Interchange) in Miyako
National Route 106 in Miyako
Sanriku Expressway (Miyako-minami Interchange) in Miyako
Sanriku Expressway (Yamada-kita Interchange) in Yamada
Sanriku Expressway (Yamada Interchange) in Yamada
Sanriku Expressway (Yamada-minami Interchange) in Yamada
Sanriku Expressway (Kamaishi-kita Interchange) in Kamaishi
National Route 106 in Kamaishi
Sanriku Expressway (Kamaishi-Tōni Interchange) in Kamaishi
Sanriku Expressway (Kamaishi-minami Interchange) in Kamaishi
Sanriku Expressway (Yoshihama Interchange) in Ōfunato
Sanriku Expressway (Sanriku Interchange) in Ōfunato
Sanriku Expressway (Ōfunato-kita Interchange) in Ōfunato
Sanriku Expressway (Ōfunato Interchange) in Ōfunato
National Route 107 in Ōfunato
Sanriku Expressway (Ōfunato-Goishikaigan Interchange) in Ōfunato
Sanriku Expressway (Kayooka Interchange) in Rikuzentakata
National Route 340 in Rikuzentakata
Sanriku Expressway (Rikuzentakata-Taosabe Interchange) in Rikuzentakata
Miyagi Prefecture
Sanriku Expressway (Karakuwa-Goharagi Interchange) in Kesennuma
Sanriku Expressway (Karakuwa-minami Interchange) in Kesennuma
National Route 284 in Kesennuma
Sanriku Expressway (Kesennuma-chūō Interchange) in Kesennuma
Sanriku Expressway (Ōya-Kaigan Interchange) in Kesennuma
National Route 346 / National Route 456 in Kesennuma
Sanriku Expressway (Motoyoshitsuya Interchange) in Kesennuma
Sanriku Expressway (Koizumi-Kaigan Interchange) in Kesennuma
Sanriku Expressway (Utatsu-kita Interchange) in Minamisanriku
Sanriku Expressway (Utatsu Interchange) in Minamisanriku
Sanriku Expressway (Minamisanriku-Kaigan Interchange) in Minamisanriku
National Route 398 in Minamisanriku
National Route 342 in Tome
Sanriku Expressway (Kahoku Interchange) in Ishinomaki
National Route 398 (Ishinomaki Bypass) in Ishinomaki
National Route 108 in Ishinomaki
National Route 398 in Ishinomaki
Sanriku Expressway (Naruse-Okumatsushima Interchange) in Higashimatsushima
National Route 346 in Matsushima
Sanriku Expressway/Sendai-Tōbu Road (Sendaikō-kita Interchange) in Miyagino-ku, Sendai
National Route 4 (Sendai Bypass) / National Route 6 / National Route 47 in Miyagino-ku, Sendai
National Route 48 / National Route 286 in Aoba-ku, Sendai

== Japan National Route 111 ==
National Route 111
- Location: Aoba-ku, Sendai, Hachinohe
- Existed: 18 May 1953–1 April 1963

National Route 111 (国道111号) is a former second-class national highway of Japan that ran north to south from Sendai to Hachinohe. It existed from 1953 to 1963, when it was incorporated into the newly formed and longer first-class Route 45.
