= Nanbu Bijin Brewery =

Brewery in Iwate Prefecture, Japan

- Industry: Beverage
- Founded: 1902
- Headquarters: 13 Aza Kamimachi, Fukuoka, Ninohe-shi, Iwate 028-6101,Japan
- Key people: Kuramoto Kuji Hideo Kuji Kosuke Hajime Yamaguchi (Brewmaster)
- Products: sake
- Website: www.nanbubijin.co.jp

Nanbu Bijin Brewery (also known as Kuji Shuzo) is located in Ninohe City in Japan.

== History ==
In 1902, Nanbu Bijin Brewery was first established as only a sake retailer. Then, in 1915, it was licensed to brew sake. Its name comes from a combination of words: nanbu stands for the region, and bijin for beautiful woman. The current tōji (Kanji: 杜氏 Hiragana: とうじ), or master sake brewer, is Hajime Yamaguchi. In 1992, Hajime was selected by the Ministry of Labor as one of the 100 Great Craftsmen.

Currently, Kuramoto Kuji Hideo and his son, Kuji Kosuke, are active in the business and employ about 25 people. Kuji Kosuke is slated to be the 7th generation of the Kuramoto family.

=== Kuji Kosuke ===
Kuji Kosuke was born May 11, 1972. He graduated from Tokyo University of Agriculture's Department of Brewing and Fermentation. In 2005, he received the Iwate Prefecture Young Distinguished Technician Award. In 2006, he became a member of the board of trustees of Fukuoka High School.

==== Positions of Public Service ====
- Chairperson, Cassiopeia Corporation Youth Conference
- School Board Member, Fukuoka High School, Iwate Prefecture
- Vice-chairman, Technology Committee, Iwate Prefecture Brewers and Distillers’ Association

== In popular culture ==
In the movie, Kampai! For the Love of Sake, the brewery is discussed.
