= Sanriku Expressway =

Road in Miyagi Prefecture, Japan

Sanriku Expressway
- 三陸自動車道
- The Sanriku Expressway highlighted in red

Route information
- Maintained by Ministry of Land, Infrastructure, Transport and Tourism
- Length: 248.1 km (154.2 mi)
- Existed: 1982–present
- Component highways: National Route 45

Major junctions
- South end: Sendaiko-kita Interchange; National Route 45 / Sendai-Tōbu Road in Sendai, Miyagi
- North end: Tarō-kita Interchange; National Route 45 / Sanriku-kita Jūkan Road in Miyako, Iwate

Location
- Country: Japan

Highway system
- National highways of Japan; Expressways of Japan

The Sanriku Expressway (三陸自動車道, Sanriku Jidōsha-dō) is an incomplete expressway that exists in multiple segments in Miyagi Prefecture and Iwate Prefecture, Japan. The expressway connects Sendai, the capital and largest city in Miyagi Prefecture, to Miyako in Iwate Prefecture. It follows the coast of the Pacific Ocean in the northern parts of the Tōhoku region, otherwise known as the Sanriku Coast. It is owned and operated by East Nippon Expressway Company (NEXCO East Japan), the Miyagi Prefecture Road Corporation, and the Ministry of Land, Infrastructure, Transport and Tourism (MLIT). The route is signed as an auxiliary route of National Route 45 as well as E6 and E45 under MLIT's "2016 Proposal for Realization of Expressway Numbering." It is one of three routes numbered E45, the other two are the Sanriku-kita Jūkan Road and the Hachinohe-Kuji Expressway, and one of many routes numbered E6, although the Sanriku Expressway only carries the number close to its southern terminus in Sendai. When completed, all of these routes will form an expressway that travels from the Tokyo Gaikan Expressway in Saitama Prefecture along the Pacific Coast to Hachinohe in Aomori Prefecture.

== Naming ==
The expressway is named after the Sanriku region of northern Japan. The region was named Sanriku in the aftermath of the Boshin War, the provinces of Mutsu and Dewa were divided. Mutsu was split into new five provinces: Rikuō (also read Mutsu), Rikuchū, Rikuzen, Iwashiro and Iwaki. The first three of these collectively known as the "Three Riku", or Sanriku, with san (三) meaning "three." They are now known, respectively, as Aomori Prefecture, Iwate Prefecture, and Miyagi Prefecture. When completed the Sanriku Expressway and Sanriku-kita Jūkan Road will span these three prefectures.

== Future ==
The expressway is expected to be entirely completed by 2020 as part of a region-wide recovery effort from the 2011 Tōhoku earthquake and tsunami.

== Junction list ==
TB= Toll booth, PA= Parking Area

Prefecture	Location	km	mi	Exit	Name	Destinations	Notes
Through to Sendai-Tōbu Road
Miyagi	Miyagino-ku, Sendai	0.0	0.0	1	Sendaikō-kita	National Route 45	
Miyagi	Tagajō	2.7	1.7	1-1	Tagajō	Miyagi Prefecture Route 35 (Izumi Shiogama Route)	
Miyagi	Rifu	4.0	2.5	2	Rifu	Sendai-Hokubu Road – to Tōhoku Expressway, Morioka, Aomori	Northern terminus of E6 concurrency, southern terminus of E45
Miyagi	Rifu	5.6	3.5	3	Rifu Shiogama	Miyagi Prefecture Route 3 (Shiogama Yoshioka Route)	
Miyagi	Rifu	7.8	4.8	4	Rifu-naka	Miyagi Prefecture Route 8 (Sendai Matsushima Route)	Northern limit of tolling by NEXCO East, southern limit of tolling by Miyagi Prefecture Road Corporation
Miyagi	Rifu	9.1	5.7	PA	Kasuga		
Miyagi	Rifu	11.8	7.3	5	Matsushima-Kaigan	Miyagi Prefecture Route 144 (Akanuma Matsushima Route)	
Miyagi	Matsushima	15.9	9.9	6	Matsushima-Ōsato	Miyagi Prefecture Route 9 (Taiwa Matsushima Route)	
Miyagi	Matsushima	19.3	12.0	7	Matsushima-kita	National Route 346	
Miyagi	Higashimatsushima	26.1	16.2	8/TB	Naruse-Okumatsushima	National Route 45	Northern terminus of toll collection by Miyagi Prefecture Road Corporation, southern terminus of section maintained by MLIT
Miyagi	Higashimatsushima	30.6	19.0	PA	Yamoto		
Miyagi	Higashimatsushima	31.9	19.8	9	Yamoto	Miyagi Prefecture Route 34 (Yamoto Kanan Route)	
Miyagi	Higashimatsushima	36.1	22.4	10	Ishinomakiko	Miyagi Prefecture Route 251 – to National Route 45	
Miyagi	Ishinomaki	38.5	23.9	11	Ishinomaki-Kanan	Miyagi Prefecture Route 16 (Ishinomaki Kashimadai Ōhira Kanan Route) – to National Route 108	
Miyagi	Ishinomaki	40.5	25.2	11-1	Ishinomaki-Onagawa	National Route 45 / National Route 398 – ⛨ Ishinomaki Red Cross Hospital	
Miyagi	Ishinomaki	45.2	28.1	12	Kahoku	Miyagi Prefecture Route 196	
Miyagi	Ishinomaki	52.6	32.7	13	Monō-Toyosato	Miyagi Prefecture Route 30	
Miyagi	Ishinomaki	56.8	35.3	14	Monō-Tsuyama	Miyagi Prefecture Route 61	
Miyagi	Tome	66.4	41.3	15	Tome	Miyagi Prefecture Route 4 (Ishinomaki Kashimadai Ōhira Kanan Route) – to National Route 108	
Miyagi	Tome	71.4	44.4	16	Tome-Tōwa	National Route 398 – to Michi-no-eki Rinrinkan	Northbound exit, southbound entrance
Miyagi	Tome	73.4	45.6	16-1	Mitakido	National Route 398 – to Michi-no-eki Mitakido	
Miyagi	Minamisanriku	82.5	51.3	17	Shizugawa	National Route 398 – to National Route 45	
Miyagi	Minamisanriku	85.5	53.1	18	Minamisanriku-Kaigan	National Route 45	
Miyagi	Minamisanriku	89.7	55.7	19	Utatsu	National Route 45	
Miyagi	Minamisanriku	93.7	58.2	20	Utatsu-kita	National Route 45	Northbound exit, southbound entrance
Miyagi	Kesennuma	99.7	62.0	21	Koizumi-Kaigan	National Route 45	Northbound exit, southbound entrance
Miyagi	Kesennuma	2-kilometer-long (1.2 mi) gap in the expressway, connection is made by National Route 45					
Miyagi	Kesennuma	101.7	63.2	22	Motoyoshitsuya	National Route 45	Southbound exit, northbound entrance
Miyagi	Kesennuma	103.7	64.4	PA	Motoyoshi		
Miyagi	Kesennuma	105.7	65.7	23	Ōya-Kaigan	National Route 45	
Miyagi	Kesennuma	108.2	67.2	23-1	Iwaisaki	Unnamed road – to National Route 45	Southbound exit, northbound entrance
Miyagi	Kesennuma	112.8	70.1	24	Kesennuma-chūō	National Route 45 (Kesennuma Bypass)	
Miyagi	Kesennuma	9-kilometer-long (5.6 mi) gap in the expressway, connection is made by National Route 45					
Miyagi	Kesennuma	121.8	75.7	—	Karakuwa-minami	National Route 45	
Miyagi	Kesennuma	124.8	77.5	29	Karakuwa-Goharagi	National Route 45	Northbound exit, southbound entrance
Miyagi	Kesennuma			PA	Karakuwaosawa		
Iwate	Rikuzentakata	128.3	79.7	30	Rikuzentakata-Taosabe	National Route 45	
Iwate	Rikuzentakata	134.8	83.8	31	Rikuzentakata	National Route 340	
Iwate	Rikuzentakata	138.9	86.3	32	Kayooka	National Route 45	Southbound exit, northbound entrance
Iwate	Ōfunato	141.3	87.8	PA	Funagawara		Parking area is only accessible for northbound traffic
Iwate	Ōfunato	142.3	88.4	33	Ōfunato-Goishikaigan	National Route 45/ Iwate Prefecture Route 38	
Iwate	Ōfunato	146.9	91.3	—	Emergency Exit	⛨ Iwate Prefecture Ōfunato Hospital	Emergency vehicles only
Iwate	Ōfunato	150.9	93.8	34	Ōfunato	National Route 45	
Iwate	Ōfunato	154.5	96.0	35	Ōfunato-kita	National Route 45	Southbound exit, northbound entrance
Iwate	Ōfunato	159.9	99.4	36	Sanriku	National Route 45	
Iwate	Ōfunato	163.5	101.6	37	Yoshihama	National Route 45	
Iwate	Kamaishi	168.5	104.7	38	Kamaishi-minami	National Route 45	Northbound exit, southbound entrance
Iwate	Kamaishi	171.0	106.3	39	Kamaishi-Tōni	National Route 45	Southbound exit, northbound entrance
Iwate	Kamaishi	177.5	110.3	40	Kamaishi	Kamaishi Expressway – to Tōhoku Expressway, Tōno, Hanamaki	
Iwate	Kamaishi	178.4	110.9	41	Kamaishi-chūō	National Route 283	
Iwate	Kamaishi	183.1	113.8	42	Kamaishi-Ryōishi	Iwate Prefecture Route 242	Southbound exit, northbound entrance
Iwate	Kamaishi	187.0	116.2	43	Kamaishi-kita	National Route 45	Southbound entrance, northbound exit
Iwate	Ōtsuchi	192.5	119.6	44	Ōtsuchi	Iwate Prefecture Route 26	
Iwate	Ōtsuchi	196.3	122.0	PA	Namita		
Iwate	Yamada	200.5	124.6	45	Yamada-minami	National Route 45	
Iwate	Yamada	208.3	129.4	46	Yamada	National Route 45	
Iwate	Yamada	216.3	134.4	47	Yamada-kita	National Route 45	Northbound exit, southbound entrance
Iwate	Miyako	220.8	137.2	PA	Tsugaruishi		
Iwate	Miyako	222.3	138.1	48	Miyako-minami	National Route 45	
Iwate	Miyako	227.1	141.1	49	Miyako-chūō	National Route 106 (Miyako West Bypass)	
Iwate	Miyako	230.5– 227.1	143.2– 141.1	50	Miyako-kita		
Iwate	Miyako	240.1	149.2	51	Tarō-minami	Iwate Prefecture Route 177	
Iwate	Miyako	244.1	151.7	52	Tarō-Masakikaigan	National Route 45	
Iwate	Miyako	248.1	154.2	53	Tarō-kita	National Route 45	Northbound exit, southbound entrance
Through to Sanriku-kita Jūkan Road
1.000 mi = 1.609 km; 1.000 km = 0.621 mi: Concurrency terminus; Incomplete access; Tolled; Unopened

== See also ==
- Joban Expressway
- Japan National Route 45
