= Sanriku-kita Jūkan Road =

Road in Japan

Sanriku-kita Jūkan Road
- 三陸北縦貫道路

Route information
- Maintained by Ministry of Land, Infrastructure, Transport and Tourism
- Length: 59.9 km (37.2 mi)
- Existed: 2006–present
- Component highways: National Route 45

Major junctions
- South end: Tarō-kita Interchange; Sanriku Expressway; National Route 45 in Miyako, Iwate
- North end: Kuji Interchange; Hachinohe-Kuji Expressway; National Route 45; National Route 395 in Kuji, Iwate

Location
- Country: Japan

Highway system
- National highways of Japan; Expressways of Japan

The Sanriku-kita Jūkan Road (三陸北縦貫道路, Sanriku-kita Jūkan Dōro) is an incompleted expressway in the coastal area of Iwate Prefecture in northern Japan. It is owned and operated primarily by the Ministry of Land, Infrastructure, Transport and Tourism (MLIT). It is routed concurrently with an alternate route of Japan National Route 45 and is numbered E45 under MLIT's "2016 Proposal for Realization of Expressway Numbering" as an expressway running parallel to the aforementioned National Route 45.

== Route description ==
As of March 2019, the expressway consists of three sections, one that bypasses the central part of Hachinohe, Aomori and the other traveling north from the central part of Kuji, Iwate. The southernmost of these begins at the northern terminus of the Sanriku Expressway in Miyako. It passes through the town of Iwaizumi and then enters the village Tanohata where it comes to a temporary end at the parallel Route 45. Further north the expressway has another section, entirely within Tanohata, measuring just over four kilometers long. Continuing north along Route 45 the expressway begins again in the village, of Fudai. Like the previous section, it is located entirely within the limits of the village, measuring just over four kilometers long before it rejoins the parallel Route 45. The northern terminus of the route when it is to be completed is located at an interchange with Japan National Route 395 in Kuji that presently only serves the Hachinohe-Kuji Expressway.

== Future ==
The expressway is expected to be completed between Tanohata and Fudai by 2020 as part of a region-wide recovery effort from the 2011 Tōhoku earthquake and tsunami.

== Junction list ==
The entire expressway is in Iwate Prefecture.

| Location | km | mi | Exit | Name | Destinations | Notes |
|---|---|---|---|---|---|---|
| Miyako | 248.1 | 154.2 | 53 | Tarō-kita | Sanriku Expressway; National Route 45 | Northbound exit, southbound entrance; southern terminus of Sanriku-kita Jūkan Road, E45 continues south as the Sanriku Expressway |
| Iwaizumi | 252.0 | 156.6 | 54 | Iwaizumi-minami | National Route 45 | Northbound entrance, southbound exit |
| Iwaizumi | 254.1 | 157.9 | 55 | Iwaizumiryūsendō | National Route 455 to National Route 45 | |
| Tanohata | 258.8 | 160.8 | 56 | Unosudangai | Unnamed road – to National Route 45, Unosu Cliff | |
| Tanohata | 260.3 | 161.7 | 57 | Tanohata-minami | National Route 45 | |
| Tanohata | 266.5– 269.2 | 165.6– 167.3 | Okanyo Tunnel | | | |
| Tanohata | 265.1 | 164.7 | 58 | Tanohata-chuo | National Route 45 | |
| Tanohata | 270.8 | 168.3 | 59 | Tanohata-kita | National Route 45 | Northbound entrance, southbound exit |
| Fudai | 280.7 | 174.4 | 60 | Fudai | Iwate Prefecture Route 44 – to National Route 45, Central Fudai, Kitayamazaki Cliffs, | |
| Fudai | 285.3 | 177.3 | 61 | Fudai-kita | National Route 45 | Northbound exit, southbound entrance |
| Noda | 296.0 | 183.9 | 62 | Noda | Iwate Prefectural Road 29 | |
| Kuji | 300.6 | 186.8 | 63 | Kuji-Ube | National Route 45 | Northbound exit, southbound entrance |
| Kuji | 304.8 | 189.4 | 64 | Kuji-minami | National Route 45 | Northbound entrance, southbound exit |
| Kuji | 308.0 | 191.4 | 65 | Kuji | Hachinohe-Kuji Expressway; National Route 45 / National Route 395 – Miyako, Kuji, Ōfunato, Kesennuma | Northern terminus of the Sanriku-kita Jūkan Road, E45 continues north as the Hachinohe-Kuji Expressway |
1.000 mi = 1.609 km; 1.000 km = 0.621 mi: Incomplete access; Route transition; Unopened
