= Kamaishi Expressway =

Expressway in Iwate Prefecture, Japan

Kamaishi Expressway
- 釜石自動車道

Route information
- Length: 79.5 km (49.4 mi)
- Existed: 2002–present
- Component highways: National Route 283

Major junctions
- West end: Hanamaki Junction; Tōhoku Expressway in Hanamaki, Iwate
- National Route 4; National Route 107; National Route 283
- East end: Kamaishi Junction; Sanriku Expressway in Kamaishi, Iwate

Location
- Country: Japan

Highway system
- National highways of Japan; Expressways of Japan

The Kamaishi Expressway (釜石自動車道, Kamaishi Jidōsha-dō) is a partially tolled two-lane national expressway in Iwate Prefecture, Japan. The expressway connects Kamaishi, Iwate on the prefecture's Pacific coast to the Tōhoku Expressway at Hanamaki, Iwate. It is owned and operated by partly by the East Nippon Expressway Company and the Ministry of Land, Infrastructure, Transport and Tourism. The expressway is signed as an auxiliary route of National Route 283 as well as E46 under the "2016 Proposal for Realization of Expressway Numbering."

== Route description ==
From Hanamaki to Tōwa the expressway is maintained and tolled by the East Nippon Expressway Company. The rest of the expressway is able to be driven without any fees. That section of the expressway is maintained by the Tōhoku branch of the Ministry of Land, Infrastructure, Transport and Tourism.

The entire expressway has only one lane in each direction, with passing lanes at some interchanges. The speed limit is 70 km/h for the entire route, except for the section between Tōno and Miyamori.

== History ==
The Kamaishi Expressway was first opened in 2002. There was a 10-kilometer gap in the expressway in Tōno and the expressway did not connect to its eastern terminus at a junction with the Sanriku Expressway. These missing links in the expressway were scheduled to be completed in 2018, but were instead opened later in March 2019.

== Junction list ==
The entire expressway is in Iwate Prefecture.

Location	km	mi	Exit	Name	Destinations	Notes
Hanamaki	0	0.0	38-2	Hanamaki	Tōhoku Expressway– Sendai, Aomori	Western terminus of Kamaishi Expressway. E46 continues south along E4 to the Akita Expressway.
Hanamaki	3.7	2.3	1	Hanamaki Airport	National Route 4/ Iwate Prefecture Route 294 – Hanamaki Airport, Morioka	
Hanamaki	4.8	3.0	TB	Hanamaki Toll Booth		
Hanamaki	11.4	7.1	2	Tōwa	National Route 283 / National Route 456 – Tōwa	
Ōshū	23	14	3	Esashi-Tase	National Route 107 – Ōshū, Kitakami	
Tōno	35.1	21.8	4	Miyamori	National Route 107 – Miyamori, Ōfunato	
Tōno	44.1	27.4	5	Tōno	Iwate Prefecture Route 238 – Tōno	
Tōno	46.0	28.6	Nabekura Tunnel			
Tōno	55.1	34.2	6	Tōno-Sumita	National Route 283 / National Route 340 – Tōno, Sumita	
Sumita	59.5	37.0	Akimaru Tunnel			
Sumita	60.2	37.4	Rōkandō Tunnel			
Sumita	64.6	40.1	7	Rōkandō	Iwate Prefecture Route 167 – Sumita, Rōkandō Cave	
Sumita	65	40	Shin-Sennin Tunnel			
Kamaishi	69.9	43.4	Kasshi Tunnel			
Kamaishi	73.5	45.7	8	Kamaishi-nishi	National Route 283 – Kamaishi, Hanamaki	
Kamaishi	76.2	47.3	-	Emergency Exit	Iwate Prefectural Kamaishi Hospital	Emergency vehicles only
Kamaishi	79.5	49.4	40	Kamaishi	Sanriku Expressway – Kamaishi-chūō, Miyako, Kuji, Ōfunato, Kesennuma	Eastern terminus
1.000 mi = 1.609 km; 1.000 km = 0.621 mi: Concurrency terminus; Incomplete access; Tolled

== See also ==
- Japan National Route 46
