= Rikuchū-Kawai Station =

Railway station in Miyako, Iwate Prefecture, Japan

Rikuchū-Kawai Station 陸中川井駅
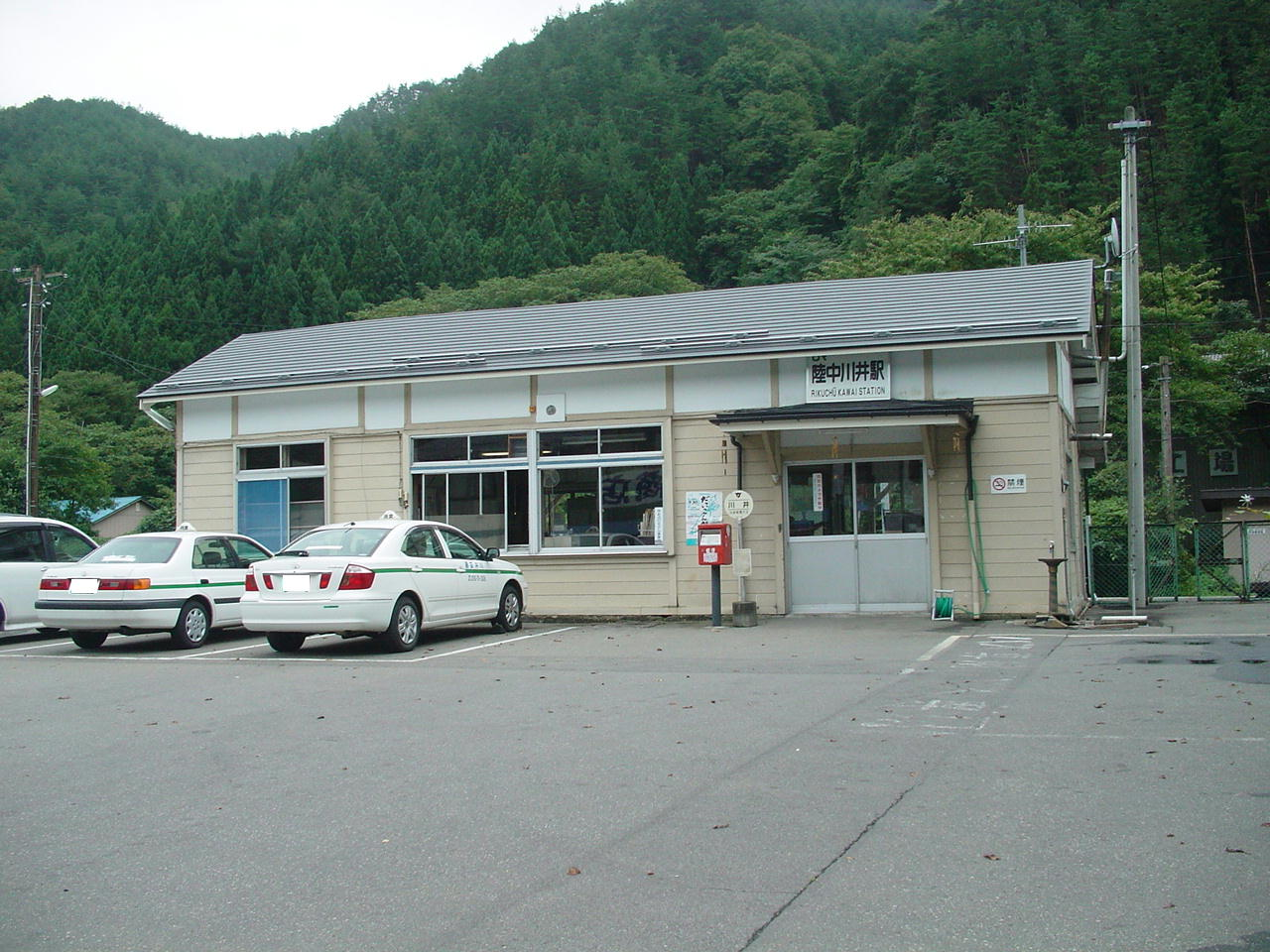
- Rikuchū-Kawai Station, September 2007

General information
- Location: Kawai Dai-go jiwari 102-10, Miyako-shi, Iwate-ken 028-2302; Japan
- Coordinates: 39.5971°N 141.6815°E
- Operator: JR East
- Line: ■ Yamada Line
- Distance: 73.5 km from Morioka
- Platforms: 1 side platform
- Tracks: 1

Construction
- Structure type: At grade

Other information
- Status: Unstaffed
- Website: Official website

History
- Opened: 30 November 1933

Passengers
- FY2015: 36 (daily)

Services
Preceding station	JR East	Following station
Kamiyonai towards Morioka	Yamada Line Rapid Rias	Moichi towards Miyako
Hakoishi towards Morioka	Yamada Line Local	Haratai towards Miyako
Location
- Location within Japan

Rikuchū-Kawai Station (陸中川井駅, Rikuchū-Kawai-eki) is a railway station on the Yamada Line in the city of Miyako, Iwate, Japan, operated by East Japan Railway Company (JR East).

== Lines ==
Rikuchū-Kawai Station is served by the Yamada Line, and is located 73.5 rail kilometers from the terminus of the line at Morioka Station.

== Station layout ==
Rikuchū-Kawai Station has a single side platform serving a single bi-directional track.

== History ==
Rikuchū-Kawai Station opened on 30 November 1933. The station was closed from 26 November 1946 to 21 November 1954. The station was absorbed into the JR East network upon the privatization of the Japanese National Railways (JNR) on 1 April 1987.

It became unstaffed on 22 April 2018.

== Passenger statistics ==
In fiscal 2015, the station was used by an average of 36 passengers daily (boarding passengers only).

== Surrounding area ==
- National Route 106 / National Route 340
- Kawai Post Office

== See also ==
- List of railway stations in Japan
