= Hachinohe Expressway =

Road in Japan

Hachinohe Expressway
- 八戸自動車道

Route information
- Length: 81.3 km (50.5 mi)
- Existed: 1986–present

Major junctions
- From: Ashiro Junction in Hachimantai, Iwate; Tōhoku Expressway
- To: Hachinohe-kita Interchange in Hachinohe, Aomori; Momoishi Toll Road; National Route 45

Location
- Country: Japan
- Major cities: Ninohe, Iwate, Hachinohe, Aomori

Highway system
- National highways of Japan; Expressways of Japan

The Hachinohe Expressway (八戸自動車道, Hachinohe Jidōsha-dō) is a 4-laned national expressway in the prefectures of Iwate and Aomori in the Tōhoku region of Japan. It is a spur of the Tōhoku Expressway, primarily serving the city of Hachinohe. Signed as E4A, it is owned and operated by East Nippon Expressway Company.

== Route description ==
The expressway is officially referred to as the Tōhoku Jūkan Expressway Hachinohe Route.

The route connects the city of Hachinohe with the Tōhoku Expressway in Iwate Prefecture. From the terminus at Hachinohe-kita Interchange, there are plans to extend the route northward to the terminus of the Aomori Expressway through a series of toll roads.

== History ==
The Hachinohe Expressway was opened on November 27, 1986, with the Momoishi Extension to the Second Michinoku Toll Road opening later in 1995. After the Great East Japan Earthquake the expressway was made free to use temporarily for those who were impacted by the disaster. Tolls resumed in March 2012.

== Future ==
Starting at the Momoishi Road Extension, the expressway is planned to be extended north and west to connect with the Aomori Expressway and the northern terminus of the Tōhoku Expressway at the Aomori Interchange. This will be done by linking existing roads, such as the Michinoku Toll Road and Daini-Michinoku Toll Road, and the completion of the Kamikita Expressway between them.

== Junction list ==
Distance markers are a continuation of the distance from the southern terminus of the Tōhoku Expressway at Kawaguchi Junction, beginning with 563.3 at Ashiro Junction and increasing as one travels north from there.

- SA - service area, PA - parking area

=== Main Route ===
Prefecture	Location	km	mi	Exit	Name	Destinations	Notes
Iwate	Hachimantai	563.3	350.0	46 (Note: This is the exit number from the Tōhoku Expressway, the Hachinohe Expressway has no exit number of its own for this junction.)	Ashiro	Tōhoku Expressway – Ashiro, Aomori, Matsu-Hachimantai, Morioka	Southern terminus
Iwate	Ninohe	578.2	359.3	1	Jōbōji	Iwate Prefecture Route 6 (Ninohe Itsukaichi Route)	
Iwate	Ninohe	582.9	362.2	PA	Ninohe		
Iwate	Ichinohe	588.7– 589.0	365.8– 366.0	Mabechigawa Bridge			
Iwate	Ichinohe	590.1	366.7	2	Ichinohe	National Route 4 (Ichinohe Bypass) – Ichinohe, Ninohe	
Iwate	Ichinohe–Kunohe border	597.5– 599.8	371.3– 372.7	Oritsume Tunnel			
Iwate	Kunohe	601.5	373.8	3	Kunohe	National Route 340 / Iwate Prefecture Route 22 (Karumai Kunohe Route) – Kunohe, Kuji	
Iwate	Karumai	607.2	377.3	SA	Oritsume		
Iwate	Karumai	611.5	380.0	4	Karumai	National Route 340 / National Route 395 / Iwate Prefecture Route 264 (Ninohe Karumai Route) – Hachinohe, Kuji, Central Karumai	
Aomori	Hachinohe	621.1	385.9	5	Nangō	Aomori Prefecture Route 42 (Nagawa Hashikami Route)	
Aomori	Nanbu	625.4	388.6	PA	Fukuchi		
Aomori	Hachinohe	627.6	390.0	5-1	Hachinohe	Branch Route / Hachinohe-Kuji Expressway	No access to northbound Hachinohe Expressway from the branch route or the Hachinohe-Kuji Expressway, no access from southbound Hachinohe Expressway to the branch route or the Hachinohe-Kuji Expressway
Aomori	Hachinohe	631.4	392.3	6	Hachinohe	Aomori Prefecture Route 29 (Hachinohe Kanjō Route)	Northern terminus
1.000 mi = 1.609 km; 1.000 km = 0.621 mi: Incomplete access

=== Branch route ===
The entire route is in Aomori Prefecture.

Location	km	mi	Exit	Name	Destinations	Notes
Through to Hachinohe Expressway
Hachinohe	627.6	390.0	5-1	Hachinohe	Hachinohe Expressway, Hachinohe-Kuji Expressway– to Kuji, Iwate, Morioka, Tōhoku Expressway	No access to northbound Hachinohe Expressway for southbound traffic, no access from southbound Hachinohe Expressway to northbound traffic
Hachinohe	636.3	395.4	5-2	Hachinohe-nishi	National Route 454	Smart Interchange, access only for drivers with ETC payment
Hachinohe	640.8	398.2	7	Hachinohe-kita	National Route 45– Aomori, Towada, Kuji, Iwate, Central Hachinohe	Expressway continues as the Momoishi Road
Momoishi Toll Road
1.000 mi = 1.609 km; 1.000 km = 0.621 mi: Electronic toll collection; Incomplete access; Route transition

== Momoishi Road Extension ==
Momoishi Toll Road
- 百石道路 (Momoishi Dōro)
- Location: Aomori Prefecture
- Length: 5.1 km (3.2 mi)
- Existed: 1995–present

The Momoishi Toll Road is the first of many extensions of the Hachinohe Expressway that travel northbound towards Aomori. The toll road is a two-lane expressway that is maintained and tolled by the East Nippon Expressway Company; however, drivers continuing north to the Daini-Michinoku Toll Road are tolled by the Aomori Prefecture Road Corporation which does not accept ETC payment, while drivers coming from that toll road to the Momoishi Road can use ETC payment.

Exit list
The entire route is in Aomori Prefecture.

Location	km	mi	Exit	Name	Destinations	Notes
Hachinohe	640.8	398.2	7	Hachinohe-kita	National Route 45	Expressway continues as the Hachinohe Expressway
Oirase	646.9	402.0	8	Shimoda Momoishi	National Route 45	Expressway continues as the Daini-Michinoku Toll Road
1.000 mi = 1.609 km; 1.000 km = 0.621 mi: Route transition
