= Japan National Route 395 =

National highway in Iwate Prefecture, Japan

National Route 395
- 国道395号
- Japan National Route 395 highlighted in red

Route information
- Length: 58.0 km (36.0 mi)
- Existed: 1982–present

Major junctions
- East end: Hachinohe-Kuji Expressway / Sanriku-kita Jūkan Road / National Route 45 in Kuji
- National Route 340; Hachinohe Expressway
- West end: National Route 4 in Ninohe

Location
- Country: Japan

Highway system
- National highways of Japan; Expressways of Japan
← National Route 394	→ National Route 396

National Route 395 (国道395号, Kokudō Kokudō Sanbyakukyūjūgo-gō) is a Japanese national highway connecting the cities of Kuji and Ninohe. The 58.0-kilometer-long (36.0 mi) highway begins at Kuji Interchange where it meets National Route 45, the Sanriku-kita Jūkan Road, and the Hachinohe-Kuji Expressway in Kuji. It travels northwest across the northeastern corner of Iwate Prefecture to Ninohe where it ends at an intersection with National Route 4.

== History ==
What would become National Route 395 was originally established as the Kuji–Fukuoka Route, a major prefectural road, in 1954 by the Ministry of Construction, a predecessor to the Ministry of Land, Infrastructure, Transport and Tourism. The Kuji–Fukuoka Route was upgraded to National Route 395 on 1 April 1982.

== List of major junctions ==
The route lies entirely within Iwate Prefecture.

Location	km	mi	Destinations	Notes
Kuji	0.0	0.0	Hachinohe-Kuji Expressway north / Sanriku-kita Jūkan Road south / National Route 45 – Hachinohe, Miyako	Eastern terminus; Kuji Interchange (E45 exit 65)
Kuji	1.9	1.2	Iwate Prefecture Route 125 west – Rikuchū-Natsui Station	
Kuji	3.1	1.9	Iwate Prefecture Route 279 north – Hanzaki	
Kuji	3.9	2.4	Hachinohe-Kuji Expressway / National Route 45 – Hachinohe, Miyako	Kuji-kita Interchange (E45 exit 66)
Hirono	12.9	8.0	Iwate Prefecture Route 153 east – Samuraihama	
Hirono	20.9	13.0	Iwate Prefecture Route 11 north – Hachinohe, Ōno	
Hirono	24.0	14.9	Iwate Prefecture Route 292 south – Heromachi	
Karumai	33.3	20.7	Iwate Prefecture Route 22 south – to Hachinohe Expressway, Kunohe	
Karumai	34.7	21.6	Iwate Prefecture Route 20 east – Taneichi	
Karumai	39.3	24.4	Iwate Prefecture Route 42 south – Central Karumai	
Karumai	41.8	26.0	National Route 340 north – Hachinohe	Eastern end of National Route 340 concurrency
Karumai	41.9	26.0	Hachinohe Expressway – Morioka, Hachinohe, Misawa; Iwate Prefecture Route 264 west – Central Karumai	Karumai Interchange (E4A exit 4)
Karumai	46.1	28.6	Iwate Prefecture Route 33 north – Hachinohe, Nagawa	
Karumai	50.7	31.5	National Route 340 south – Hachinohe	Western end of National Route 340 concurrency
Ninohe	58.0	36.0	National Route 4 (Kintaichi Bypass) – Ninohe Station, Morioka, Towada, Sannohe	Western terminus
1.000 mi = 1.609 km; 1.000 km = 0.621 mi: Concurrency terminus
