= Iwaizumi, Iwate =

Iwaizumi 岩泉町
- Town
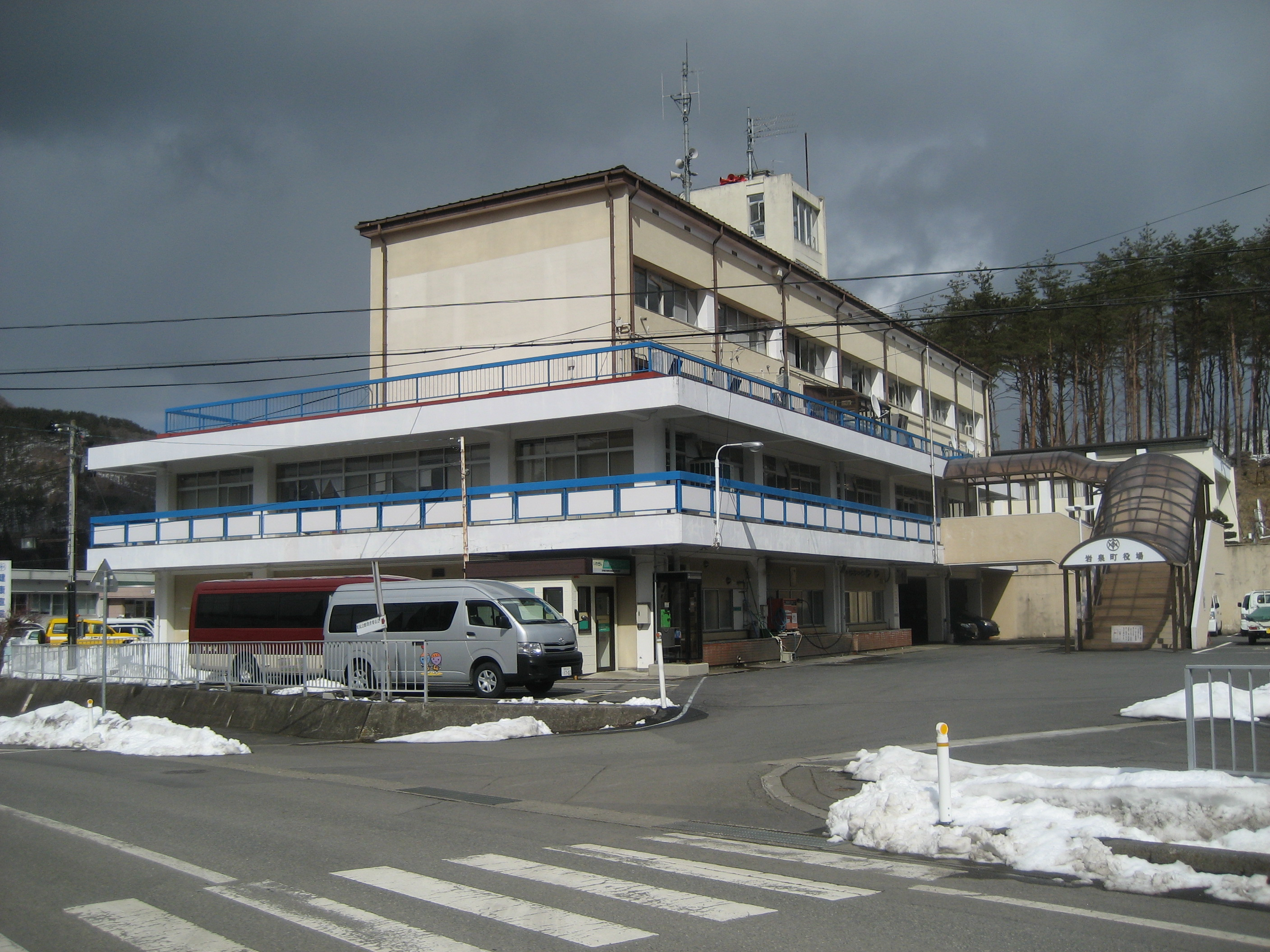
- Iwaizumi Town Hall

- Flag Seal

- Location of Iwaizumi in Iwate Prefecture

- Coordinates: 39°50′35.3″N 141°47′47″E
- Country: Japan
- Region: Tōhoku
- Prefecture: Iwate
- District: Shimohei

Area
  - Total: 992.36 km^{2} (383.15 sq mi)

Population (March 31, 2020)
  - Total: 8,987
  - Density: 9.056/km^{2} (23.46/sq mi)
- Time zone: UTC+9 (Japan Standard Time)
- Phone number: 0194-22-2111
- Address: Iwaizumi-aze Sohata 59-5, Iwaizumi-chō, Shimohei-gun, Iwate 027-0595
- Climate: Cfa
- Website: Official website
- Symbols
- Bird: Copper pheasant
- Flower: Kiri
- Tree: Japanese red pine

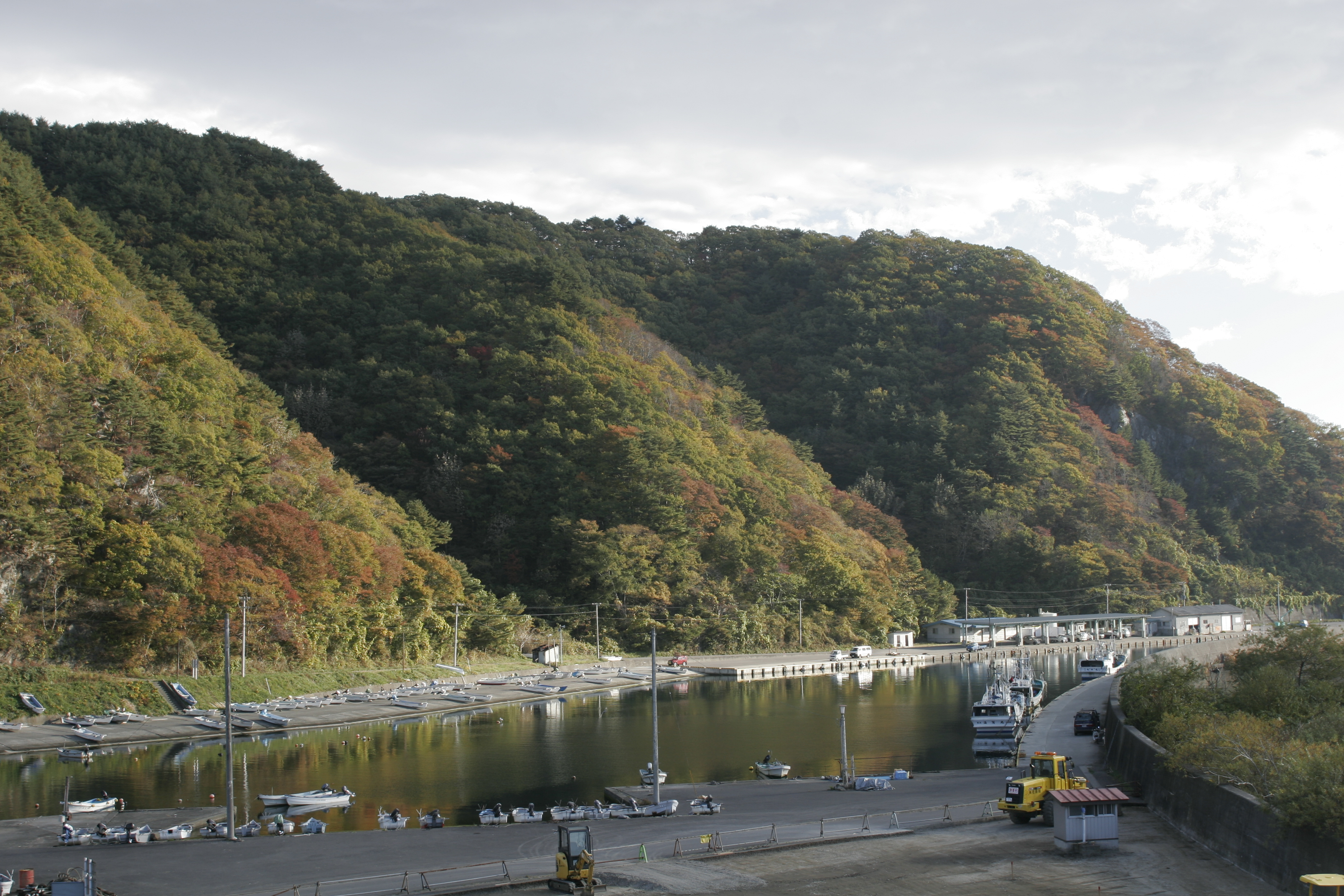
Landscape in Iwaizumi

Iwaizumi (岩泉町, Iwaizumi-chō) is a town located in Iwate Prefecture, Japan. As of 29 February 2024, the town had a population of 8,006, and a population density of 8.1 persons per km^{2} in 4123 households. The total area of the town is 992.36 square kilometres (383.15 sq mi).

== History ==
The area of present-day Iwaizumi was part of the ancient Mutsu Province, which was dominated by the Nambu clan during the Edo period, who ruled Morioka Domain under the Tokugawa shogunate.

With the Meiji period establishment of the modern municipalities system, the village of Iwaizumi was created within Kitahei District on April 1, 1889. Kitahei, Nakahei and Higashihei Districts were all merged into Minamihei District on March 29, 1896.

Iwaizumi was elevated to town status on August 1, 1922. On September 30, 1956, Imaizumi annexed the neighboring villages of Akka, Ugei, Okawa and Omoto and on April 1, 1957, annexed the village of Kogawa to reach is present borders.

In August 2016, Typhoon Lionrock hit the town with strong winds and heavy rain that caused landslides and flooding. 19 people died, including 9 people who drowned in a nursing home after a river burst its banks.

== Geography ==
Iwaizumi is in the Kitakami Mountains of northeast Iwate prefecture, east of the prefectural capital of Morioka. It has a small coastline on the Pacific Ocean to the east. The area has numerous limestone caves, including the Ryūsendō.

=== Neighboring municipalities ===
Iwate Prefecture

- Fudai
- Kuji
- Kuzumaki
- Miyako
- Morioka
- Noda
- Tanohata

=== Climate ===
Iwaizumi has a humid subtropical climate (Köppen climate classification Cfa) characterized by mild summers and cold winters with heavy snowfall. The average annual temperature in Iwaizumi is 9.5 °C. The average annual rainfall is 1283 mm with September as the wettest month and February as the driest month. The temperatures are highest on average in August, at around 22.3 °C, and lowest in January, at around −2.0 °C.

Climate data for Iwaizumi, Iwate (1991−2020 normals, extremes 1976−present)
Month	Jan	Feb	Mar	Apr	May	Jun	Jul	Aug	Sep	Oct	Nov	Dec	Year
Record high °C (°F)	15.8 (60.4)	20.5 (68.9)	24.5 (76.1)	31.9 (89.4)	34.8 (94.6)	36.3 (97.3)	37.0 (98.6)	38.5 (101.3)	35.5 (95.9)	29.3 (84.7)	25.7 (78.3)	22.0 (71.6)	38.5 (101.3)
Mean daily maximum °C (°F)	3.6 (38.5)	4.5 (40.1)	8.8 (47.8)	15.6 (60.1)	20.8 (69.4)	23.3 (73.9)	26.5 (79.7)	27.7 (81.9)	24.0 (75.2)	18.6 (65.5)	12.8 (55.0)	6.2 (43.2)	16.0 (60.9)
Daily mean °C (°F)	−1.0 (30.2)	−0.5 (31.1)	3.0 (37.4)	8.9 (48.0)	14.1 (57.4)	17.5 (63.5)	21.2 (70.2)	22.3 (72.1)	18.4 (65.1)	12.2 (54.0)	6.4 (43.5)	1.3 (34.3)	10.3 (50.6)
Mean daily minimum °C (°F)	−5.0 (23.0)	−5.0 (23.0)	−2.0 (28.4)	2.7 (36.9)	8.1 (46.6)	12.5 (54.5)	17.2 (63.0)	18.2 (64.8)	14.1 (57.4)	7.1 (44.8)	1.2 (34.2)	−2.8 (27.0)	5.5 (42.0)
Record low °C (°F)	−16.0 (3.2)	−17.1 (1.2)	−13.1 (8.4)	−6.3 (20.7)	−2.1 (28.2)	1.2 (34.2)	6.8 (44.2)	7.5 (45.5)	4.3 (39.7)	−3.0 (26.6)	−7.2 (19.0)	−14.2 (6.4)	−17.1 (1.2)
Average precipitation mm (inches)	51.5 (2.03)	40.8 (1.61)	63.7 (2.51)	70.0 (2.76)	82.4 (3.24)	104.6 (4.12)	151.3 (5.96)	165.0 (6.50)	181.0 (7.13)	129.2 (5.09)	52.6 (2.07)	58.1 (2.29)	1,151.3 (45.33)
Average snowfall cm (inches)	77 (30)	77 (30)	45 (18)	4 (1.6)	0 (0)	0 (0)	0 (0)	0 (0)	0 (0)	0 (0)	2 (0.8)	33 (13)	243 (96)
Average rainy days	4.9	5.6	8.0	8.5	9.2	9.6	12.2	11.6	11.7	8.5	6.9	6.0	102.7
Average snowy days	10.1	9.7	4.5	0.3	0	0	0	0	0	0	0.3	4.2	29.1
Mean monthly sunshine hours	134.8	138.7	174.6	186.7	190.7	161.6	132.7	146.1	131.8	143.7	133.6	124.4	1,807.2
Source 1: JMA
Source 2: JMA

== Demographics ==
Per Japanese census data, the population of Iwaizumi peaked in around the year 1960 and has declined steadily over the past 60 years, and is now less than half of what it was in the year 1970, and less than it was a century ago.

Historical population
Year	Pop.	±%
1920	15,286	—
1930	17,326	+13.3%
1940	22,894	+32.1%
1950	24,751	+8.1%
1960	27,813	+12.4%
1970	22,177	−20.3%
1980	18,267	−17.6%
1990	15,164	−17.0%
2000	12,845	−15.3%
2010	10,804	−15.9%
2020	8,726	−19.2%

== Government ==
Iwaizumi has a mayor-council form of government with a directly elected mayor and a unicameral village council of 10 members. Iwaizumi, together with the city of Miyako and the villages of Fudai, Tanohata and Yamada, collectively contributes three seats to the Iwate Prefectural legislature. In terms of national politics, the village is part of Iwate 2nd district of the lower house of the Diet of Japan.

== Economy ==
The local economy is based on agriculture and to a lesser extent on commercial fishing.

== Education ==
Iwaizumi has five public elementary schools and three public junior high schools operated by the town government, and one public high school operated by the Iwate Prefectural Board of Education.

== Transportation ==
=== Railway ===
Sanriku Railway – Kita-Rias Line

- Iwaizumi-Omoto

The JR East Iwaizumi Line, which connected Iwaizumi with Moichi Station on the Yamada Line suspended operations on 31 July 2010, due to a landslide. The line was officially closed on April 1, 2014, owing to low public demand.

=== Highway ===
- Sanriku-kita Jūkan Road
- National Route 45
- National Route 340
- National Route 455

== Local attractions ==
- Akkadō – cave system
- Ryūsendō – cave system

== International relations ==
- (United States) Wisconsin Dells, Wisconsin, USA, sister city since August 1990

== Noted people from Iwaizumi ==
- Kin Endate – amateur astronomer
- Rika Miura – actress
- Shunsuke Sato – video game composer
