= Karumai, Iwate =

Karumai 軽米町
- Town
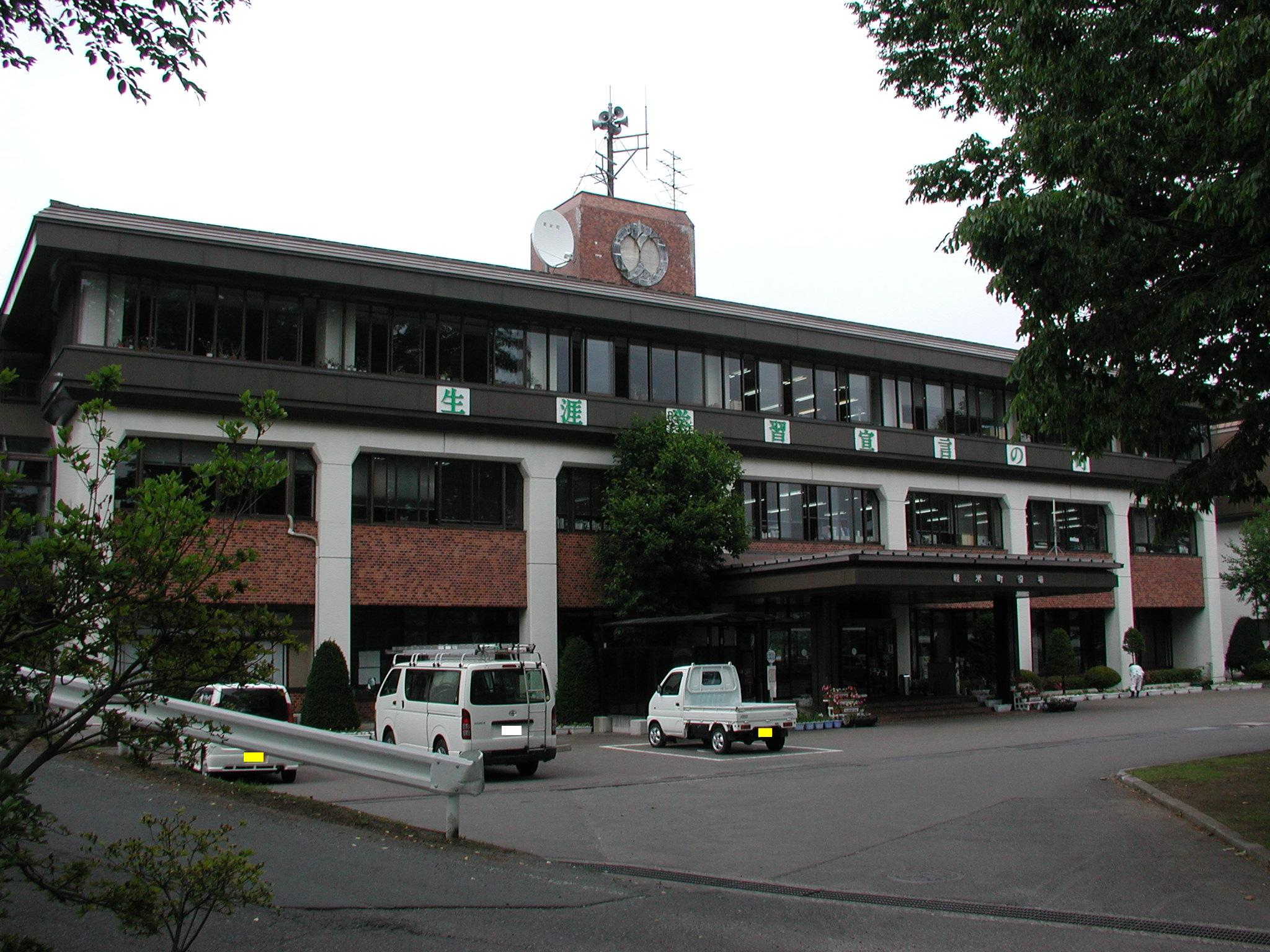
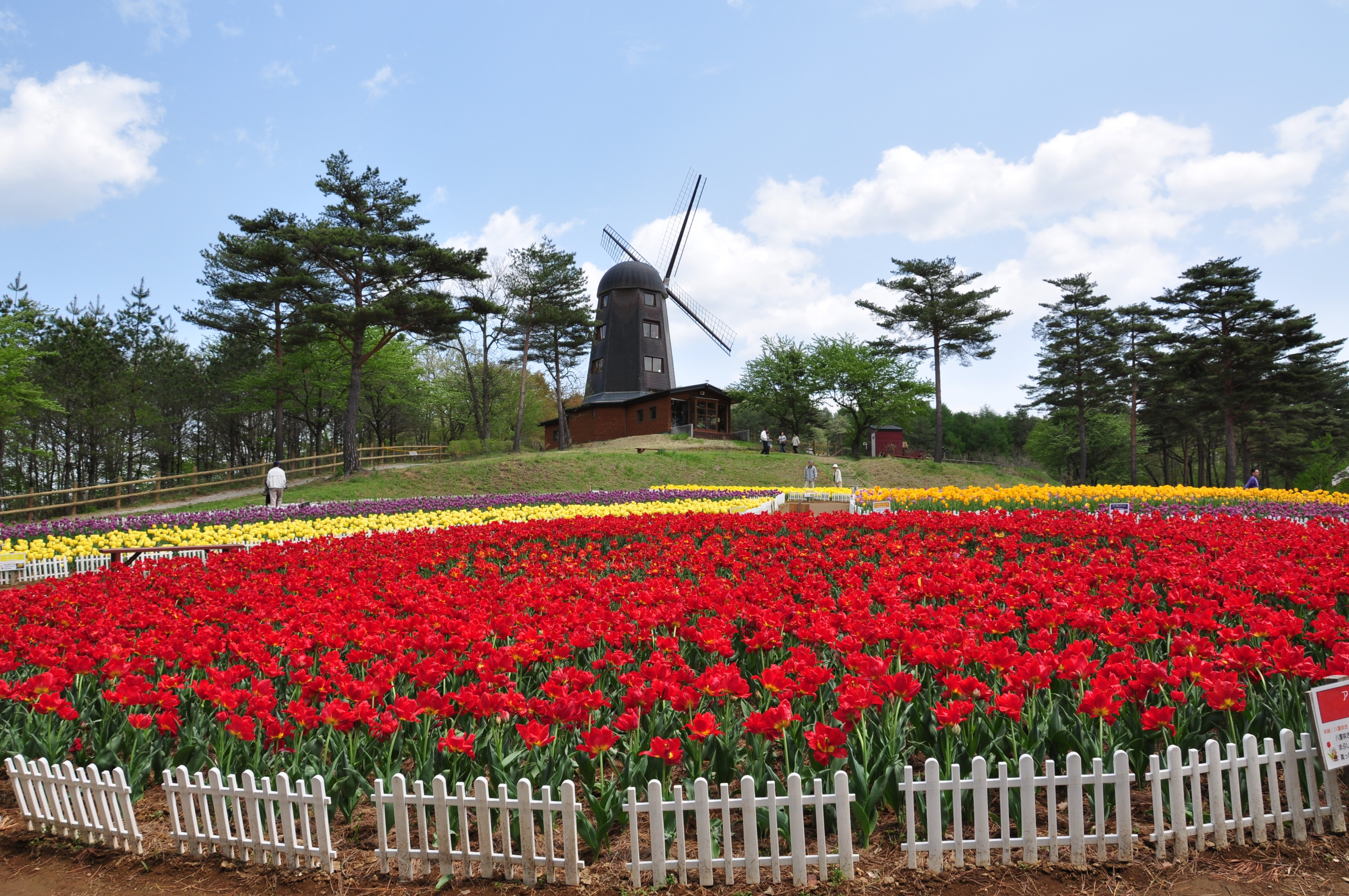
- Karumai Town Hall Park in Karumai

- Flag Emblem

- Location of Karumai in Iwate Prefecture

- Location of Karumai in Japan
- Coordinates: 40°19′36.3″N 141°27′37.7″E
- Country: Japan
- Region: Tōhoku
- Prefecture: Iwate
- District: Kunohe

Area
  - Total: 245.82 km^{2} (94.91 sq mi)

Population (March 1, 2020)
  - Total: 8,895
  - Density: 36.19/km^{2} (93.72/sq mi)
- Time zone: UTC+9 (Japan Standard Time)
- Phone number: 0195-46-2111
- Address: Karumai dai-10 chiwari 85, Karumai-machi, Kunohe-gun, Iwate 028-6302
- Climate: Dfa
- Website: Official website
- Symbols
- Bird: Copper pheasant
- Flower: Kobushi
- Tree: Japanese Yew

Karumai (軽米町, Karumai-machi) is a town in Iwate Prefecture, Japan. As of 31 March 2020, the town had an estimated population of 8,895 in 3769 households, and a population density of 36 persons per km². The town's total area is 245.82 square kilometres (94.91 sq mi).

== Geography ==
Karumai is located in far northcentral Iwate Prefecture, bordered by Aomori Prefecture to the north.

=== Neighboring municipalities ===
Aomori Prefecture

- Hachinohe
- Hashikami
- Nanbu

Iwate Prefecture

- Hirono
- Kuji
- Kunohe
- Ninohe

=== Climate ===
Karumai has a humid oceanic climate (Köppen climate classification Cfa) characterized by mild summers and cold winters. The average annual temperature in Karumai is 9.5 °C. The average annual rainfall is 1209 mm, with September being the wettest month and February being the driest month. The temperatures are highest on average in August, at around 22.5 °C, and lowest in January, at around -2.4 °C.

Climate data for Karumai (1991−2020 normals, extremes 1976−present)
Month	Jan	Feb	Mar	Apr	May	Jun	Jul	Aug	Sep	Oct	Nov	Dec	Year
Record high °C (°F)	14.2 (57.6)	17.2 (63.0)	21.1 (70.0)	29.1 (84.4)	33.0 (91.4)	33.8 (92.8)	34.6 (94.3)	36.2 (97.2)	33.9 (93.0)	28.3 (82.9)	23.4 (74.1)	18.4 (65.1)	36.2 (97.2)
Mean daily maximum °C (°F)	1.4 (34.5)	2.4 (36.3)	6.6 (43.9)	13.7 (56.7)	19.6 (67.3)	22.6 (72.7)	25.8 (78.4)	27.0 (80.6)	23.3 (73.9)	17.4 (63.3)	11.0 (51.8)	4.2 (39.6)	14.6 (58.2)
Daily mean °C (°F)	−2.6 (27.3)	−2.0 (28.4)	1.6 (34.9)	7.7 (45.9)	13.4 (56.1)	17.0 (62.6)	20.9 (69.6)	22.0 (71.6)	18.0 (64.4)	11.5 (52.7)	5.5 (41.9)	0.0 (32.0)	9.4 (48.9)
Mean daily minimum °C (°F)	−7.5 (18.5)	−7.3 (18.9)	−3.6 (25.5)	1.5 (34.7)	7.1 (44.8)	11.8 (53.2)	16.8 (62.2)	17.8 (64.0)	13.2 (55.8)	5.7 (42.3)	0.1 (32.2)	−4.5 (23.9)	4.3 (39.7)
Record low °C (°F)	−21.7 (−7.1)	−23.0 (−9.4)	−18.8 (−1.8)	−10.0 (14.0)	−2.8 (27.0)	0.1 (32.2)	6.3 (43.3)	6.4 (43.5)	1.1 (34.0)	−4.4 (24.1)	−10.5 (13.1)	−18.6 (−1.5)	−23.0 (−9.4)
Average precipitation mm (inches)	40.1 (1.58)	38.1 (1.50)	54.5 (2.15)	57.9 (2.28)	80.5 (3.17)	93.3 (3.67)	150.2 (5.91)	162.6 (6.40)	151.0 (5.94)	113.0 (4.45)	60.4 (2.38)	56.3 (2.22)	1,050.9 (41.37)
Average precipitation days (≥ 1.0 mm)	8.1	7.3	8.8	9.6	10.1	9.2	11.5	11.7	11.4	9.7	10.1	8.5	116
Mean monthly sunshine hours	113.5	112.2	156.0	178.7	196.6	163.3	136.6	156.1	142.9	148.9	125.5	109.6	1,752.1
Source: JMA

== Demographics ==
Per Japanese census data, the population of Karumai peaked around 1960 and has steadily declined over the past 60 years.

Historical population
Year	Pop.	±%
1920	12,147	—
1930	13,561	+11.6%
1940	14,716	+8.5%
1950	16,842	+14.4%
1960	17,672	+4.9%
1970	15,462	−12.5%
1980	13,768	−11.0%
1990	12,646	−8.1%
2000	11,863	−6.2%
2010	10,212	−13.9%
2020	8,895	−12.9%

== History ==
The area of present-day Karumai was part of ancient Mutsu Province, dominated by the Nambu clan from the Muromachi period, and part of Hachinohe Domain under the Edo period Tokugawa shogunate. During the early Meiji period, the village of Karumai within Kitakunohe District, Iwate Prefecture was created on April 1, 1889, with the establishment of the modern municipalities system. Kita-Kunohe District and Minami-Kunohe District merged to form Kunohe District on April 1, 1897. The village was raised to town status on January 1, 1925. The neighboring villages of Kogarumai and Hareyama were merged with Karumai on January 1, 1955.

== Government ==
Karumai has a mayor-council form of government with a directly elected mayor and a unicameral town council of 12 members. As part of the Kunohe District, Karumai contributes two seats to the Iwate Prefectural legislature. In terms of national politics, the town is part of Iwate's 2nd district of the lower house of the Diet of Japan.

== Economy ==
The economy of Karumai is based on agriculture, particularly the various grains, including millet, livestock raising, and the production of charcoal. The hardy kiwi is a noted local specialty.

== Education ==
Karumai has three public elementary schools, one public middle school operated by the town government, and one public high school operated by the Iwate Prefectural Board of Education.

== Transportation ==
=== Railway ===
- Karumai does not have any passenger train service.

=== Highway ===
- Hachinohe Expressway – Orizume Service Area - Karumai Interchange
- National Route 340
- National Route 395

== Noted people from Karumai ==
- Haruichi Furudate, manga artist (Haikyu!!, Yotsuya Senpai no Kaidan). Much of Haikyu!! is based on actual locations in Karumai.
