= Tanesashi Kaigan Hashikamidake Prefectural Natural Park =

Former natural park of Aomori prefecture, Japan

Coordinates: 40°24′3″N 141°35′4″E

- 種差海岸階上岳県立自然公園
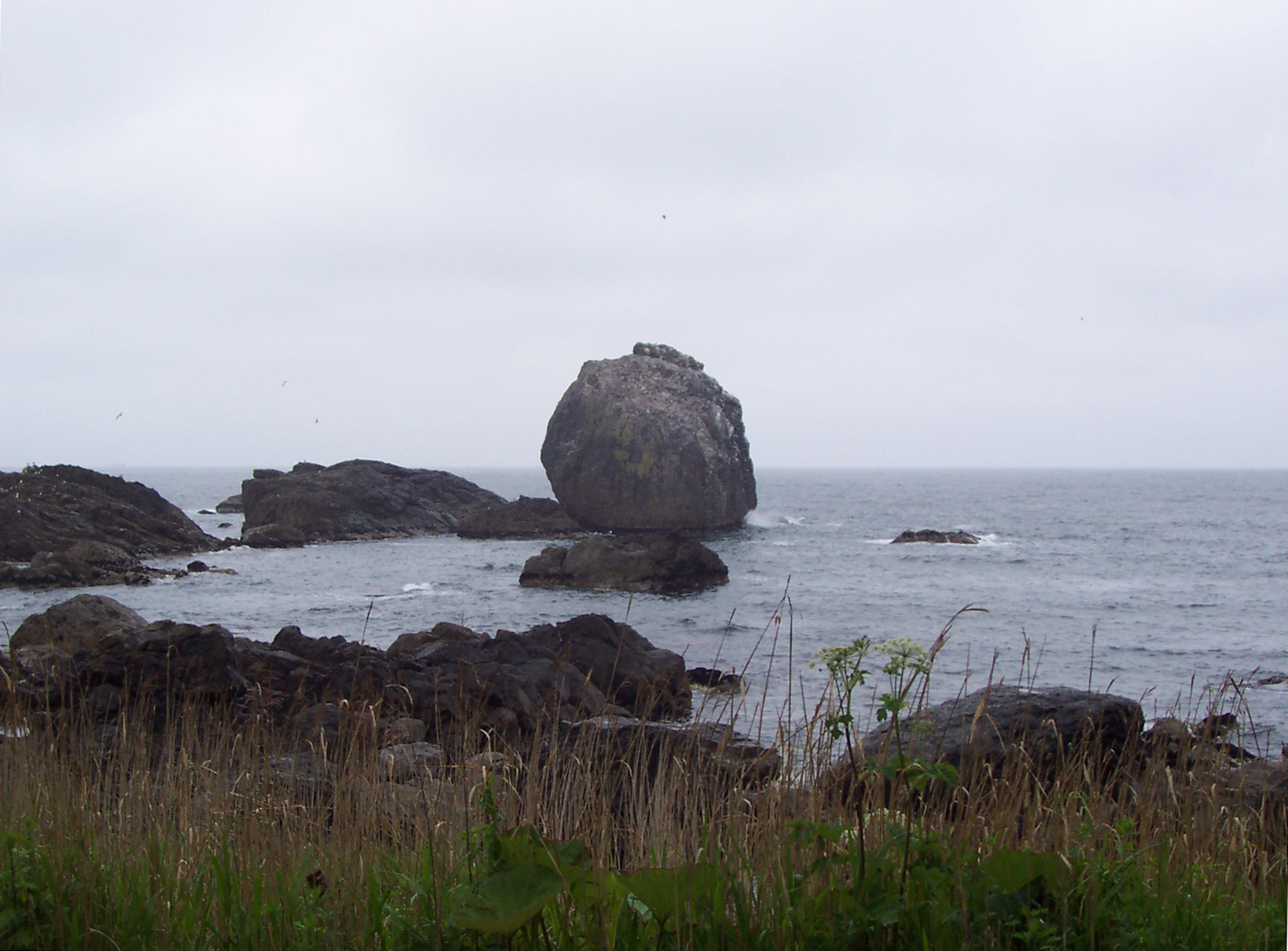
- Tanesashi Coast

- Location within Aomori Prefecture Location within Japan
- Location: Aomori Prefecture, Japan
- Nearest city: Hachinohe/Hashikami
- Area: 24.06 km^{2} (9.29 sq mi)
- Established: 10 June 1953

Tanesashi Kaigan Hashikamidake Prefectural Natural Park (種差海岸階上岳県立自然公園, Tanesashi Kaigan Hashikamidake kenritsu shizen-kōen) is a Prefectural Natural Park in southeast Aomori Prefecture, Japan. Established in 1953, the park spans the borders of the municipalities of Hachinohe and Hashikami. It derives its name from the Tanesashi Coast and Mount Hashikami (階上岳). In 2013 the park was incorporated into Sanriku Fukkō National Park.

== See also ==
- National Parks of Japan
