= Hashikami =

Hashikami 階上町
- Town
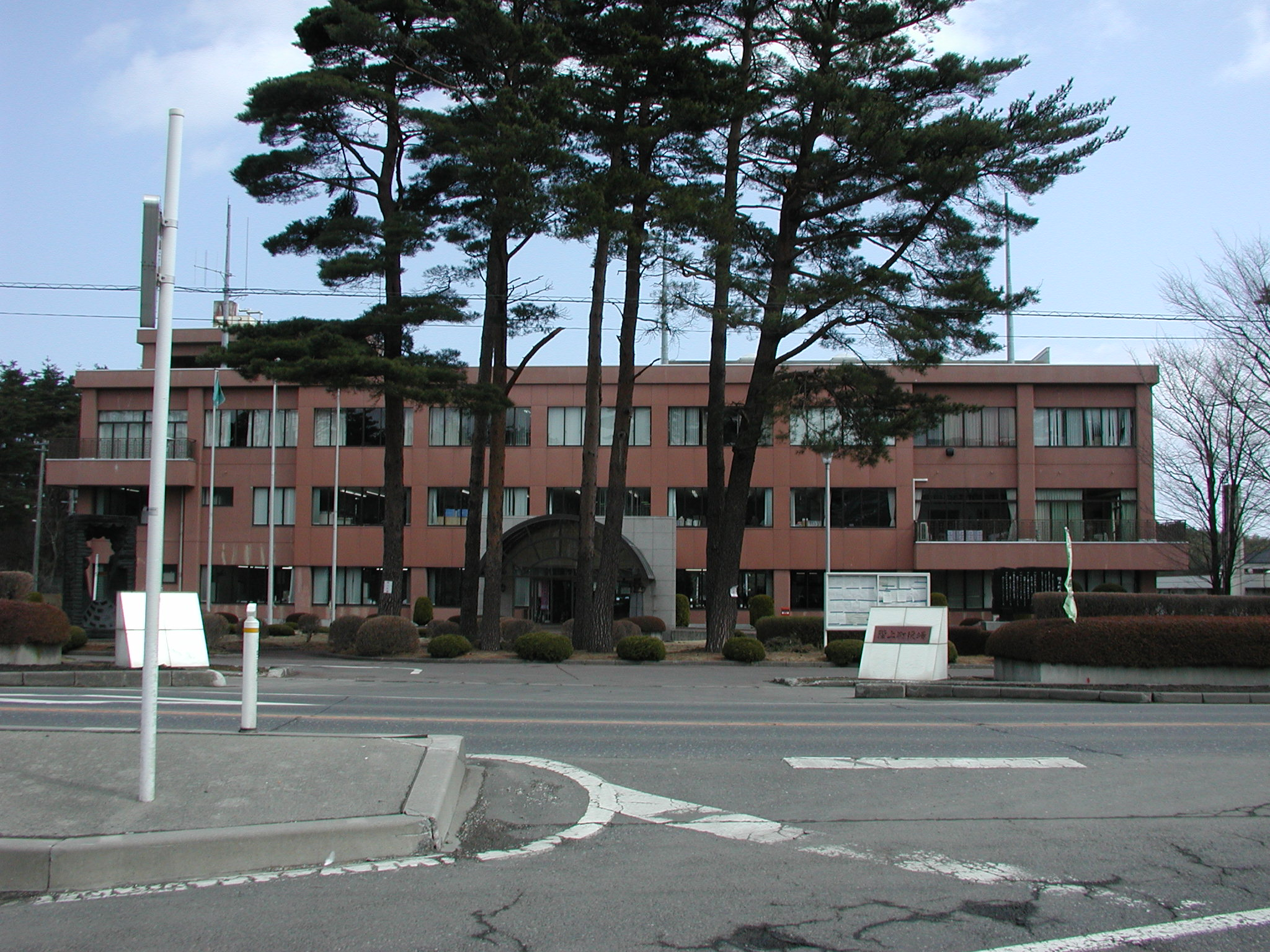
- Hashikami Town Office

- Flag Seal
- Interactive map of Hashikami
- Coordinates: 40°27′09″N 141°37′16″E
- Country: Japan
- Region: Tōhoku
- Prefecture: Aomori
- District: Sannohe

Area
  - Total: 94.00 km^{2} (36.29 sq mi)

Population (December 31, 2025)
  - Total: 12,345
  - Density: 131.3/km^{2} (340.1/sq mi)
- Time zone: UTC+9 (Japan Standard Time)
- Phone number: 0178-88-2111
- Address: 1-87 Dobutsu, Hashikami-cho, Sannohe-gun, Aomori-ken 039-1201
- Website: Official website
- Symbols
- Bird: Japanese bush-warbler
- Fish: Fat greenling
- Flower: Rhododendron
- Tree: Zelkova serrata

Hashikami (階上町, Hashikami-chō) is a town located in Aomori Prefecture, Japan. As of 31 December 2025, the town had an estimated population of 12,345 in 6,000 households, and a population density of 131 persons per km^{2} The total area of the town is 94.01 square kilometres (36.30 sq mi).

== Geography ==
Hashikami occupies the far southeast corner of Aomori Prefecture, facing the Pacific Ocean. The coastline is rugged and highly indented, forming numerous small bays. Inland, the land is hilly, rising to the west to a height of 740 metres (2,430 ft) at the highest point. A portion of the coastal areas of the town were within the borders of the Tanesashi Kaigan Hashikamidake Prefectural Natural Park, which was incorporated into the Sanriku Fukkō National Park in 2013.

=== Neighbouring municipalities ===
Aomori Prefecture

- Hachinohe
- Hirono

Iwate Prefecture

- Karumai

=== Climate ===
The town has a cold maritime climate characterized by cool, short summers and long, cold winters with heavy snowfall (Köppen climate classification Cfa). The average annual temperature in Hashikami is 9.5 °C. The average annual rainfall is 1172 mm with September as the wettest month. The temperatures are highest on average in August, at around 22.2 °C, and lowest in January, at around -2.2 °C.

== Demographics ==
Per Japanese census data, the population of Hashikami peaked around the year 2000 and is in gradual decline.

Historical population

Year	Pop.	±%
1920	6,530	—
1930	7,414	+13.5%
1940	8,288	+11.8%
1950	9,767	+17.8%
1960	10,260	+5.0%
1970	9,272	−9.6%

Year	Pop.	±%
1980	10,199	+10.0%
1990	12,959	+27.1%
2000	15,618	+20.5%
2010	14,702	−5.9%
2020	13,496	−8.2%

== History ==
The area around Hashikami has been inhabited since ancient times, and a number of Buddhist temples in the area claim to have been founded in the Nara period or Heian period. During the Edo period, it was controlled by the Nambu clan of Morioka Domain, and after 1664, was part of Hachinohe Domain. With the establishment of the modern municipalities system on 1 April 1889, Hashikami Village was proclaimed from the merger of eight small hamlets. It was elevated to town status on May 1, 1980.

== Government ==
Hashikami has a mayor-council form of government with a directly elected mayor and a unicameral town council of 14 members. Hashikami is part of Sannohe District which contributes three members to the Aomori Prefectural Assembly. In terms of national politics, the town is part of Aomori 2nd district of the lower house of the Diet of Japan.

== Economy ==
The economy of Hashikami is heavily dependent on commercial fishing and agriculture, including the raising of chickens and pigs. The town also serves as a bedroom community for the nearby city of Hachinohe.

== Education ==
Hashikami has six public elementary schools and two public middle schools operated by the town government, and one public elementary school and public middle school shared with Hachinohe. The town does not have a high school.

== Transportation ==
=== Railway ===
East Japan Railway Company (JR East) - Hachinohe Line

- Ōja – Hashikami

=== Highway ===
- Hachinohe-Kuji Expressway
- National Route 45

== Local attractions ==
- Sanriku Fukkō National Park
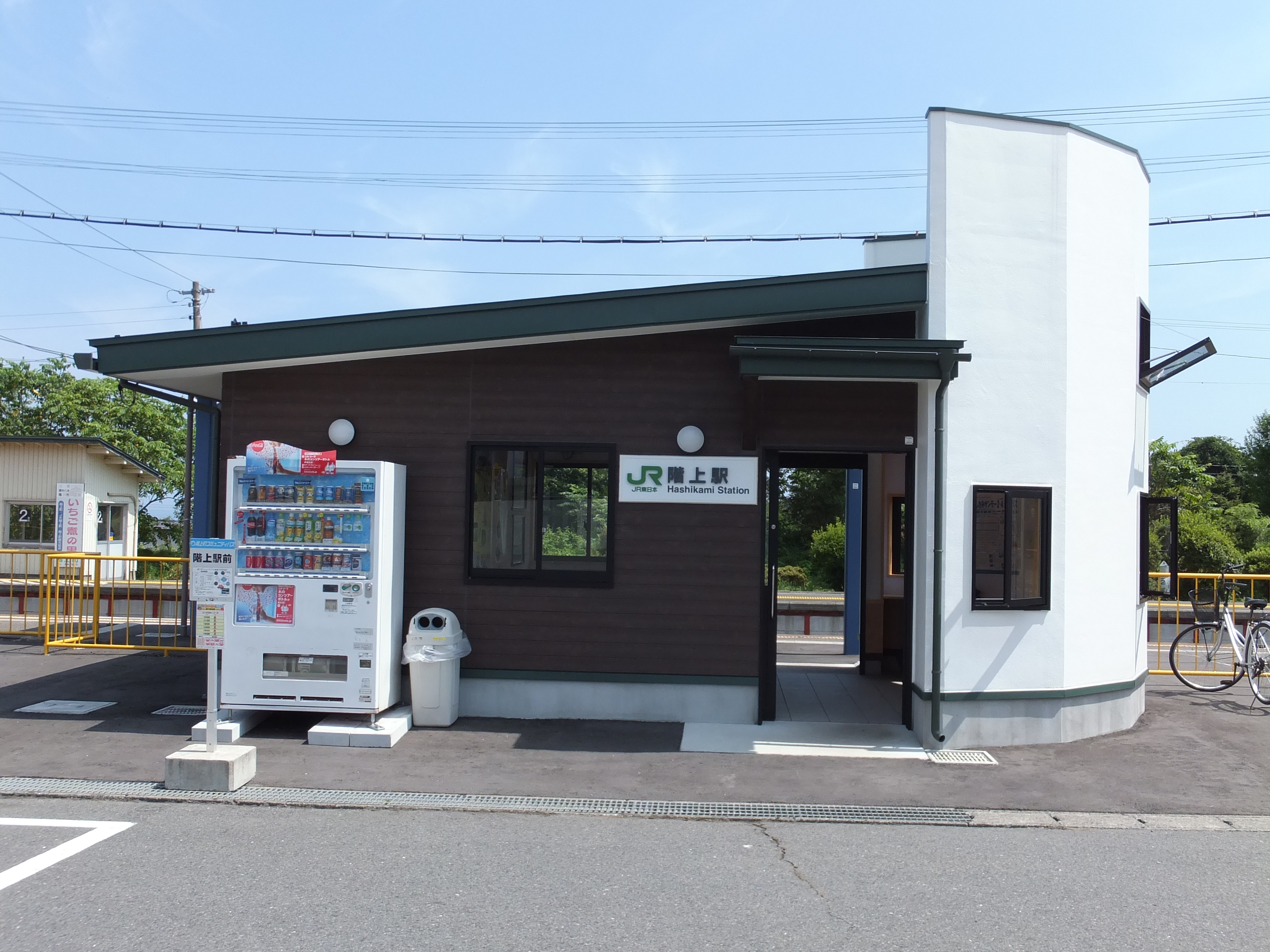
JR Hashikami Station

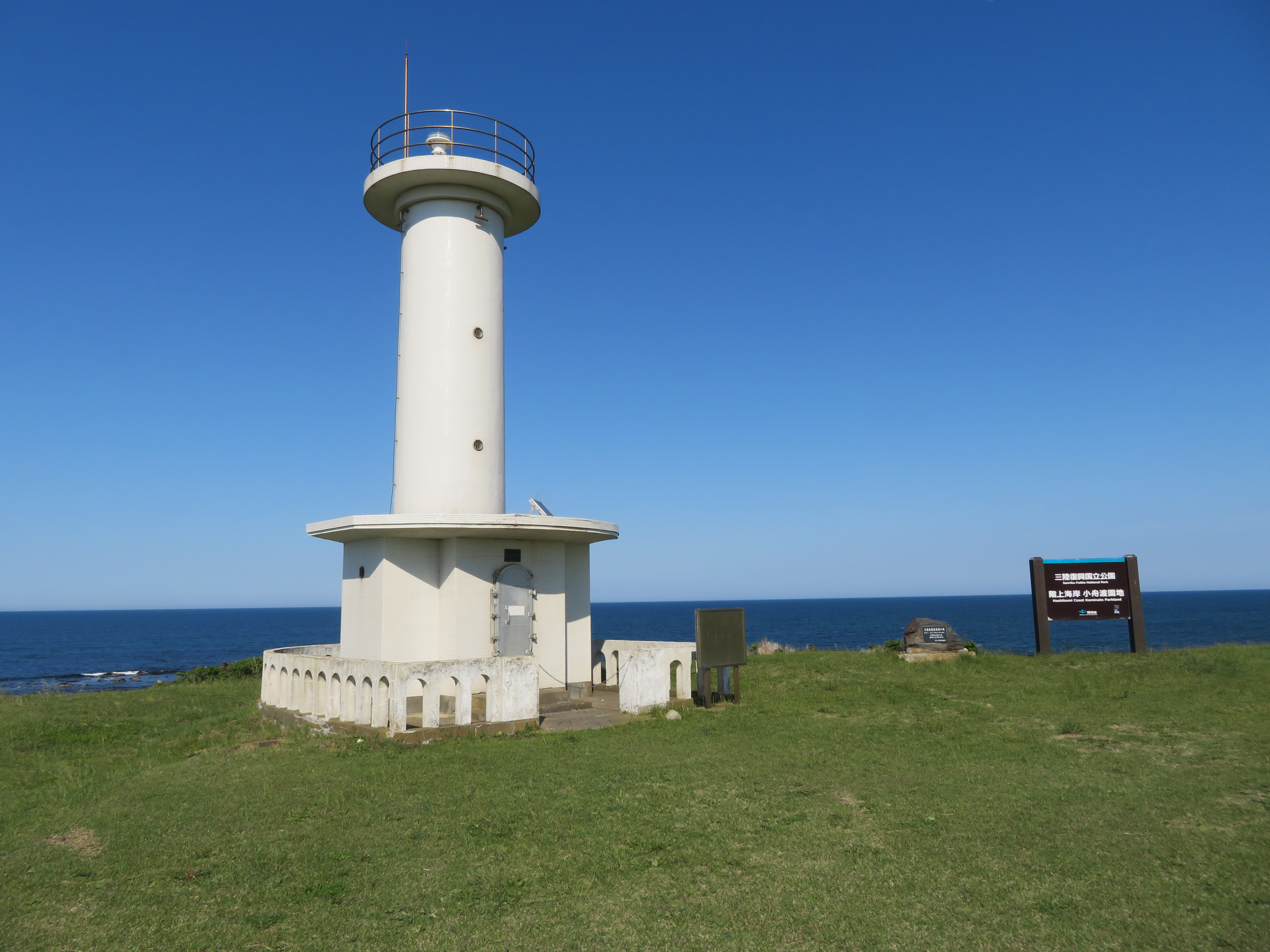
Hashikami Kaigan Kobunato Parkland

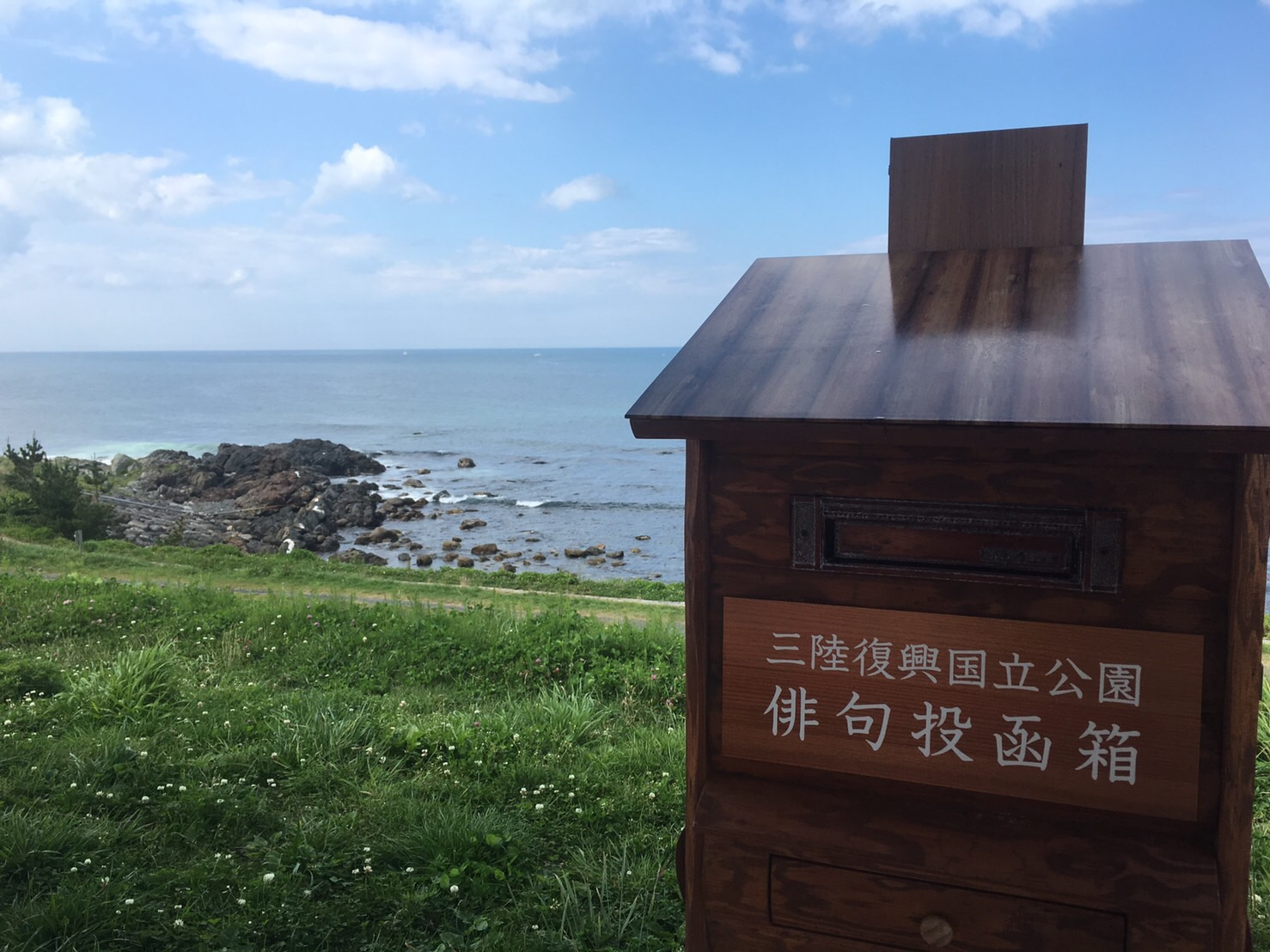
Haiku post box, Sanriku-Fukko National Park

== Noted people from Hashikami ==
- Jūmonji Tomokazu – sumo wrestler
