= Ryūsendō =

Cave in Iwate Prefecture, Japan

Ryusendo Cave
- 龍泉洞
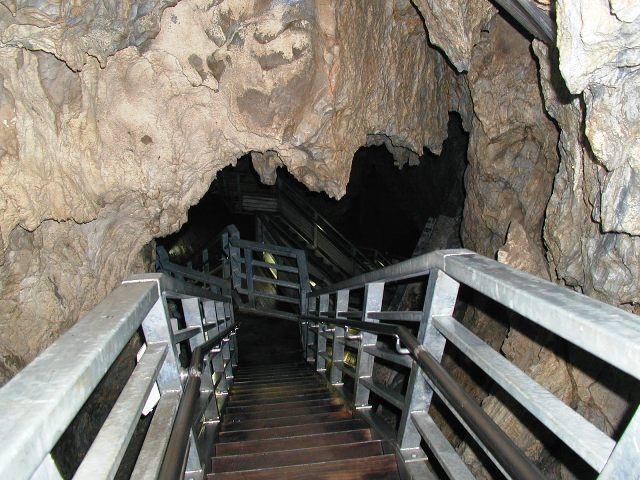
- Entrance to Ryusendo Cave

- Location within Iwate Prefecture
- Location: Iwaizumi, Iwate Prefecture, Japan
- Coordinates: 39°51′37.92″N 141°47′50.21″E
- Depth: 249 meters
- Length: 5,000 meters
- Geology: Limestone
- Access: Public
- Show cave opened: 1934
- Show cave length: 700 meters
- Website: https://www.iwate-ryusendo.jp/

Underground lake

Ryusendo Cave (龍泉洞) is one of Japan's three largest limestone caverns. It is located in the town of Iwaizumi, Iwate Prefecture, in the Tōhoku region of northern Japan.

== Overview ==
Ryusendo Cave has an accessible length of 4,088 meters, making it the 62nd longest in Japan; however, its depth of 249 metres (817 ft) from the entrance to its lowest point is the 5th deepest in Japan. The total confirmed length of the cave is currently 5,000 metres (16,000 ft), although the cave may extend much further. Further exploration has been banned following a fatality in December 1968. The cave system includes at least four underground lakes, the third of which has a depth of 98 metres (322 ft), and the fourth of which (not accessible to the public) has a depth of over 120 metres (390 ft). The cave system is also home to colonies of greater horseshoe bat, eastern long-fingered bat, brown long-eared bat and Hilgendorf's tube-nosed bat as well as microbats.

Ryusendo Cave was designated a Natural monument by the Japanese government in 1938. The caves were opened to the public in 1934. Its underground lake system was designated one of the "100 Famous Springs of Japan" in 1985 by the Ministry of the Environment.

== Ryusen Shindo Science Museum ==
The adjacent Ryusen Shindo Science Museum (龍泉新洞科学館, "New Ryusendo Science Museum") cave nearby were discovered in 1967. It claims to be the "first natural cave science museum in the world", and contains displays of earthenware and stoneware discovered in 1967, together with displays on the geology of the main Ryusendo Cave.

== Gallery ==
第一地底湖

第二地底湖

第三地底湖

第一地底湖展望台

月宮殿

遊歩道

龍泉洞入口

百間廊下

遊歩道
