= Japan National Route 456 =

Road in Japan

National Route 456
- 国道456号

Route information
- Length: 154.5 km (96.0 mi)

Location
- Country: Japan

Highway system
- National highways of Japan; Expressways of Japan
← National Route 455	→ National Route 457

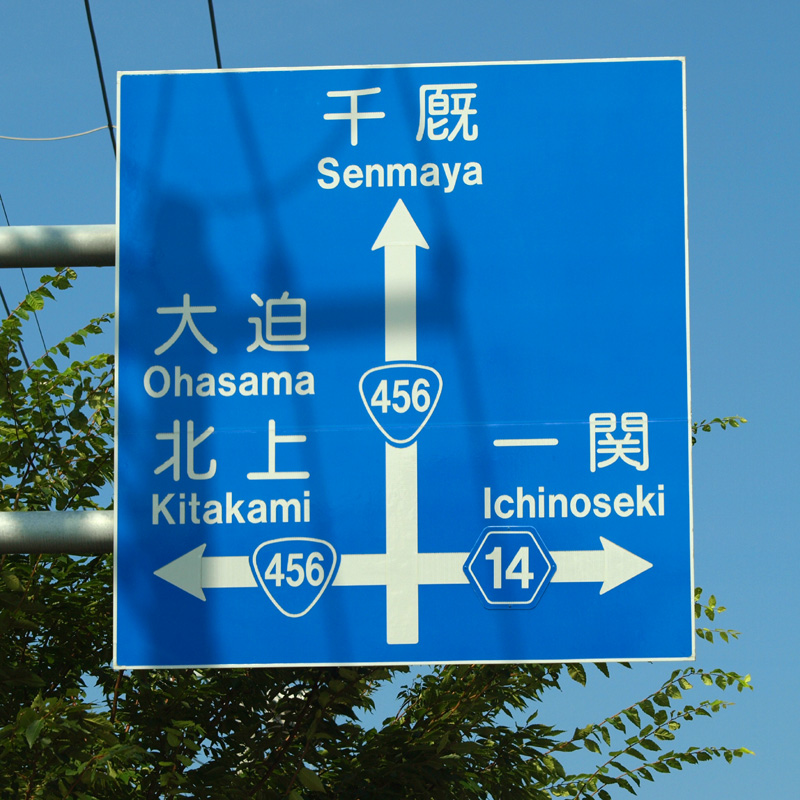
Sign on Prefectural Road 8 in Esashi Ward, Oshu City showing how 456 joins 8 and 14. JR Mizusawa-Esashi Station is on 14 to the right. This sign is usually hidden by tree branches in summer.

National Route 456 is a national highway of Japan connecting Morioka, Iwate and Motoyoshi, Miyagi in Japan, with a total length of 154.5 km (96 mi).
