= Ninohe =

Ninohe 二戸市
- City
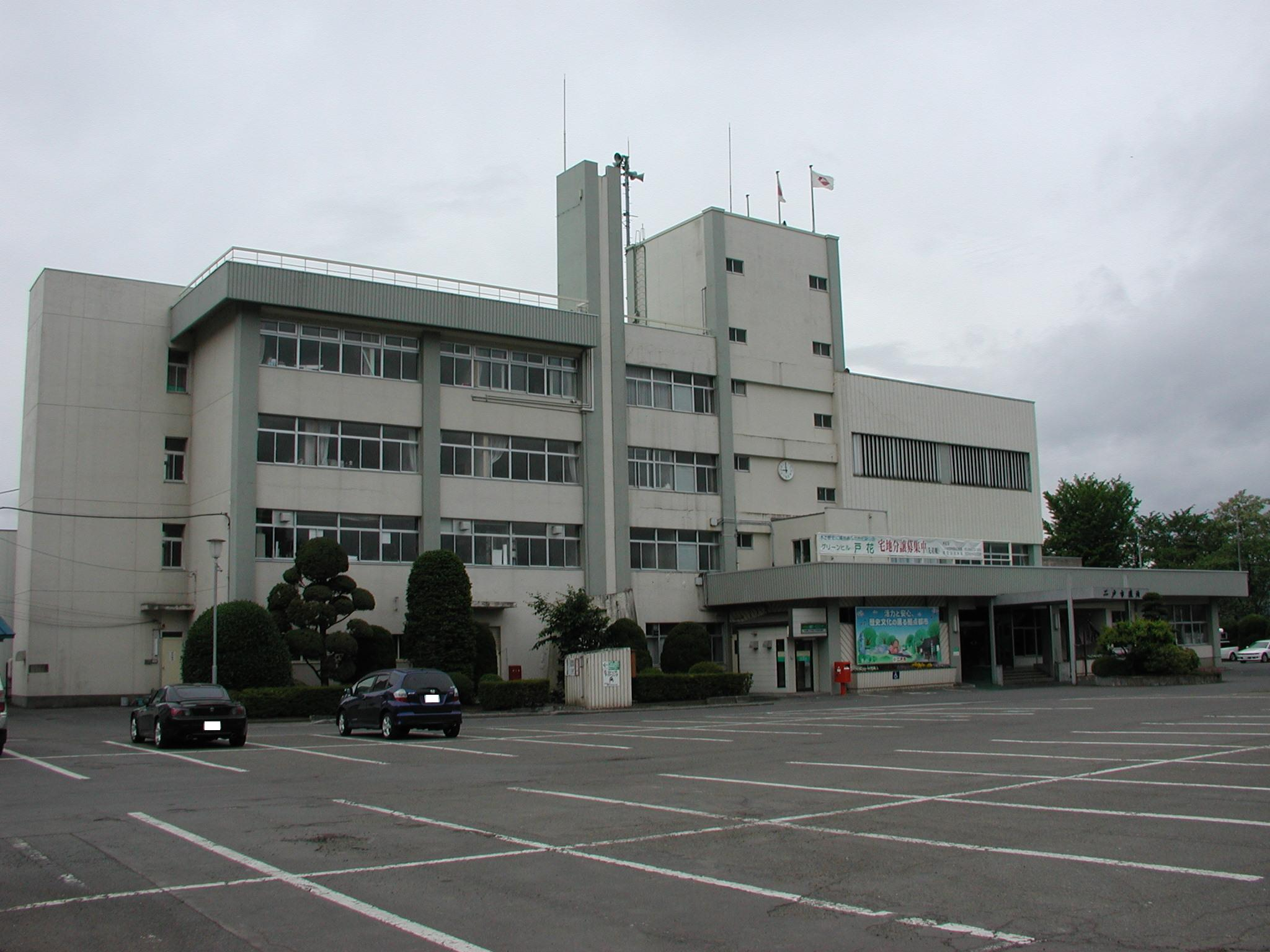
- Ninohe City Hall

- Flag Seal

- Location of Ninohe in Iwate Prefecture

- Coordinates: 40°16′16.5″N 141°18′17.2″E
- Country: Japan
- Region: Tōhoku
- Prefecture: Iwate

Area
  - Total: 420.42 km^{2} (162.33 sq mi)

Population (March 31, 2020)
  - Total: 26,344
  - Density: 62.661/km^{2} (162.29/sq mi)
- Time zone: UTC+9 (Japan Standard Time)
- Phone number: 0195-23-3111
- Address: 47 Fukuoka Kawamata, Ninohe-shi, Iwate-ken 028-6192
- Climate: Dfa
- Website: Official website
- Symbols
- Bird: Green pheasant
- Flower: Yamazakura
- Tree: Urushi

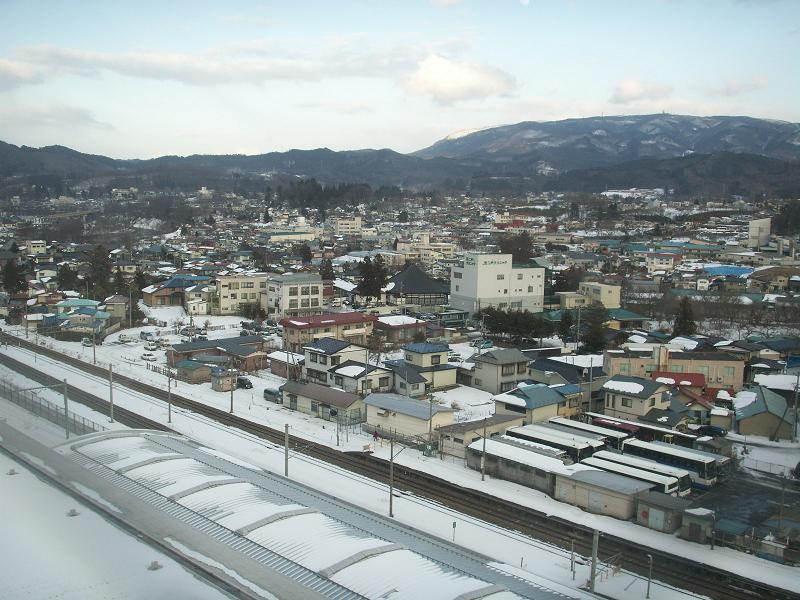
Skyline of Ninohe

Ninohe (二戸市, Ninohe-shi) is a city located in Iwate Prefecture, Japan. As of 31 March 2020, the city had an estimated population of 26,344, and a population density of 63 persons per km^{2} in 11,803 households. The total area of the city is 420.42 square kilometres (162.33 sq mi).

== Geography ==
Ninohe is located in far north-center Iwate Prefecture, bordered by Aomori Prefecture to the north. The northern end of the Kitakami Mountains, the 852.2 meter Mount Oritsume is in Ninohe. Approximately 70% of the city area is mountainous and forested. The upper reaches of the Mabechi River flows through the city. A portion of the city is within the borders of the Oritsume Basenkyō Prefectural Natural Park.

=== Neighboring municipalities ===
Aomori Prefecture

- Nanbu
- Sannohe
- Takko

Iwate Prefecture

- Hachimantai
- Ichinohe
- Karumai
- Kunohe

== Climate ==
Ninohe has a humid continental climate (Köppen Dfb) characterized by mild summers and cold winters with heavy snowfall. The average annual temperature in Ninohe is 9.7 °C. The average annual rainfall is 1248 mm with September as the wettest month and February as the driest month. The temperatures are highest on average in August, at around 23.0 °C, and lowest in January, at around -2.4 °C.

Climate data for Ninohe (elevation 87 m, 1991–2020 normals, extremes 1976–present)
Month	Jan	Feb	Mar	Apr	May	Jun	Jul	Aug	Sep	Oct	Nov	Dec	Year
Record high °C (°F)	14.4 (57.9)	16.0 (60.8)	21.2 (70.2)	30.5 (86.9)	33.8 (92.8)	34.5 (94.1)	35.5 (95.9)	35.8 (96.4)	34.0 (93.2)	28.1 (82.6)	23.8 (74.8)	18.7 (65.7)	35.8 (96.4)
Mean daily maximum °C (°F)	1.7 (35.1)	2.7 (36.9)	7.1 (44.8)	14.2 (57.6)	20.3 (68.5)	23.6 (74.5)	26.6 (79.9)	27.7 (81.9)	23.9 (75.0)	17.8 (64.0)	11.1 (52.0)	4.3 (39.7)	15.1 (59.2)
Daily mean °C (°F)	−2.3 (27.9)	−1.6 (29.1)	2.0 (35.6)	8.1 (46.6)	13.9 (57.0)	17.7 (63.9)	21.5 (70.7)	22.5 (72.5)	18.4 (65.1)	11.7 (53.1)	5.7 (42.3)	0.2 (32.4)	9.8 (49.6)
Mean daily minimum °C (°F)	−6.6 (20.1)	−6.4 (20.5)	−3.1 (26.4)	1.8 (35.2)	7.7 (45.9)	12.6 (54.7)	17.4 (63.3)	18.3 (64.9)	13.8 (56.8)	6.4 (43.5)	0.6 (33.1)	−3.8 (25.2)	4.9 (40.8)
Record low °C (°F)	−17.0 (1.4)	−18.2 (−0.8)	−15.9 (3.4)	−8.4 (16.9)	−1.6 (29.1)	2.3 (36.1)	8.3 (46.9)	8.6 (47.5)	1.2 (34.2)	−2.2 (28.0)	−9.5 (14.9)	−14.8 (5.4)	−18.2 (−0.8)
Average precipitation mm (inches)	39.8 (1.57)	39.4 (1.55)	52.8 (2.08)	55.3 (2.18)	74.9 (2.95)	87.0 (3.43)	159.6 (6.28)	154.0 (6.06)	144.3 (5.68)	104.6 (4.12)	64.3 (2.53)	59.7 (2.35)	1,033.9 (40.70)
Average snowfall cm (inches)	93 (37)	93 (37)	41 (16)	1 (0.4)	0 (0)	0 (0)	0 (0)	0 (0)	0 (0)	0 (0)	1 (0.4)	49 (19)	280 (110)
Average precipitation days (≥ 1.0 mm)	9.3	9.2	10.1	10.0	9.8	9.5	11.5	11.2	11.2	10.3	11.3	10.8	124.0
Mean monthly sunshine hours	98.9	111.4	156.8	181.8	198.8	173.1	143.5	160.6	146.2	148.2	117.6	96.5	1,733.4
Source: Japan Meteorological Agency

== Demographics ==
Per Japanese census data, the population of Ninohe peaked around the year 1960 and has steadily declined over the past 60 years.

Historical population
Year	Pop.	±%
1920	27,217	—
1930	30,054	+10.4%
1940	33,415	+11.2%
1950	40,573	+21.4%
1960	40,644	+0.2%
1970	38,289	−5.8%
1980	37,537	−2.0%
1990	35,017	−6.7%
2000	33,102	−5.5%
2010	29,818	−9.9%
2020	25,513	−14.4%

== History ==
The area of present-day Ninohe was part of ancient Mutsu Province, and has been settled since at least the Jōmon period. Many Jōmon and Kofun period remains have been found. Inhabited by the Emishi tribes, the Nihon Shoki describes the penetration of the area by forces of the imperial dynasty in the late Nara period; however, it was not under effective control of the central government until the mid-Heian period. The area was dominated by the Nanbu clan from the early Muromachi period, and was named for one of the nine numbered stockades, or fortified ranches, that established to secure this frontier area. During the Edo period, the area was under the control of Morioka Domain.

In the early Meiji period, the town of Fukuoka and the villages of Jōbōji, Kindaichi, Gohenchi, Tomai, Ishikiridokoro, and Nisattai were established within Ninohe District on April 1, 1889 with the establishment of the modern municipalities system. Jōbōji was elevated to town status on December 25, 1940. Gohenchi, Tomai, Ishikiridokoro, and Nisattai merged with Fukuoka on March 10, 1955. The modern city was founded on April 1, 1972, with the merger of the town of Fukuoka with the village of Kindaichi. On January 1, 2006, the city of Ninohe annexed the town of Jōbōji.

== Government ==
Ninohe has a mayor-council form of government with a directly elected mayor and a unicameral city legislature of 18 members. Ninohe, and the town of Ichinohe contribute two seats to the Iwate Prefectural legislature. In terms of national politics, the city is part of Iwate 2nd district of the lower house of the Diet of Japan.

== Economy ==
The local economy of Ninohe is based on agriculture and food processing. Local produce include apples, dairy products and hops.

== Education ==
Ninohe has eight public elementary schools and four middle schools operated by the city government, and two public high schools operated by the Iwate Prefectural Board of Education. There is also a prefectural vocational school, and a special education school for the handicapped operated by the prefectural government.

== Transportation ==
=== Railway ===
East Japan Railway Company (JR East) - Tōhoku Shinkansen

- Ninohe

Iwate Ginga Railway Line

- Ninohe - Tomai - Kintaichi-Onsen

=== Highway ===
- Hachinohe Expressway – Jōbōji IC
- National Route 4
- National Route 395

== Local attractions ==
- Basenkyo ravine on the Mabechi River, a National Place of Scenic Beauty.
- Kindaichi Onsen, a popular hot spring resort
- Site of Kunohe Castle, a National Historic Site
- Tendai-ji temple, founded in the Nara period

== Noted people from Ninohe ==
- Tanakadate Aikitsu, scientist

== In popular media ==
In Bullet Train Explosion, Ninohe City has been briefly mentioned.
