= Japan National Route 455 =

National highway in Japan

National Route 455
- 国道455号

Route information
- Length: 104.4 km (64.9 mi)

Location
- Country: Japan

Highway system
- National highways of Japan; Expressways of Japan
← National Route 454	→ National Route 456

National Route 455 is a national highway of Japan connecting Morioka, Iwate and Iwaizumi, Iwate in Japan, with a total length of 104.4 kilometers (64.87 mi).
