= Kuji =

Kuji may refer to:

- Kuji, Iwate, a city in Iwate Prefecture, Japan
- Kuji District, Ibaraki, a district in Ibaraki Prefecture, Japan
- Kuji, Iran, a village in Iran
- Kuji River (Iwate), a river in Iwate Prefecture, Japan
- Kuji River (Ibaraki), a river in Fukushima, Tochigi and Ibaraki Prefectures, Japan
- Kuji, the handle of Matthew Bevan, a Welsh hacker
- Kuji-in, a system of Japanese ritual gestures
- Kuji of Colchis (fl. 4th century BC), ancient Georgian monarch
- Akiko Kuji (born 1994), Japanese television announcer
- Shuhei Kuji (born 1987), Japanese ice hockey player
- Teruyoshi Kuji (born 1969), Japanese baseball player
