= Kuji-Hiraniwa Prefectural Natural Park =

Natural park of Iwate prefecture, Japan

- 久慈平庭県立自然公園
- Interactive map of Kuji-Hiraniwa Prefectural Natural Park
- Location: Iwate Prefecture, Japan
- Coordinates: 40°05′02″N 141°30′28″E
- Area: 18.44 km^{2} (7.12 sq mi)
- Established: 8 May 1961

Kuji-Hiraniwa Prefectural Natural Park (久慈平庭県立自然公園, Kuji-Hiraniwa kenritsu shizen kōen) is a Prefectural Natural Park in Iwate Prefecture, Japan. Established in 1961, the park spans the municipalities of Kuji and Kuzumaki.

== See also ==
- National Parks of Japan
- Kuji River (Iwate)
