= Hirono, Iwate =

Hirono 洋野町
- Town
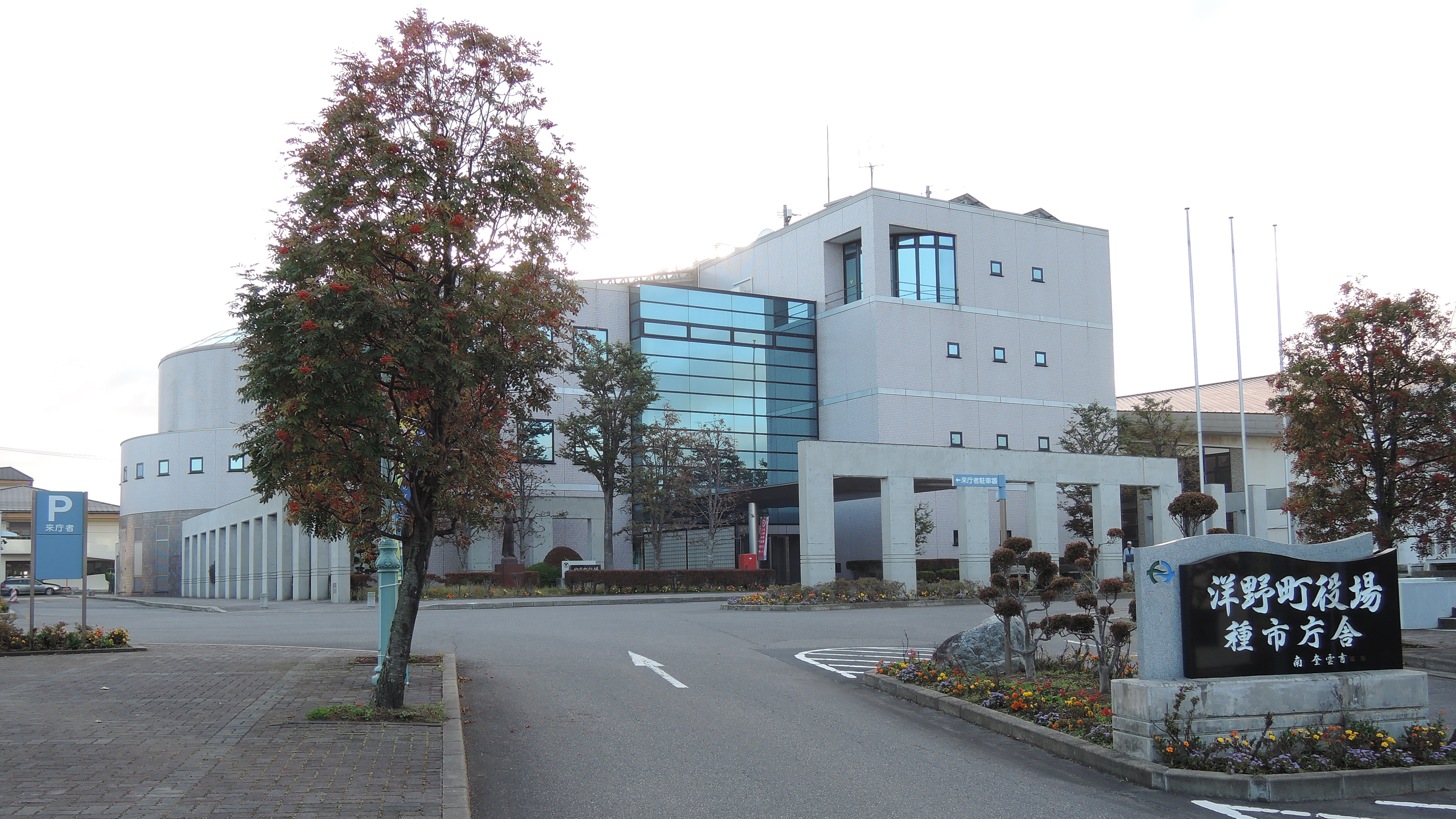
- Hirono Town Hall

- Flag Seal
- Interactive map of Hirono
- Coordinates: 40°24′30.7″N 141°43′7.3″E
- Country: Japan
- Region: Tōhoku
- Prefecture: Iwate
- District: Kunohe

Area
  - Total: 302.92 km^{2} (116.96 sq mi)

Population (May 31, 2024)
  - Total: 14,906
  - Density: 49.208/km^{2} (127.45/sq mi)
- Time zone: UTC+9 (Japan Standard Time)
- Phone number: 0194-65-2111
- Address: Taneichi dai-23 jiwari 27, Hirono-machi, Kunohe-gun, Iwate 028-7995
- Website: Official website
- Symbols
- Bird: Common gull
- Flower: Rhododendron
- Tree: Japanese red pine

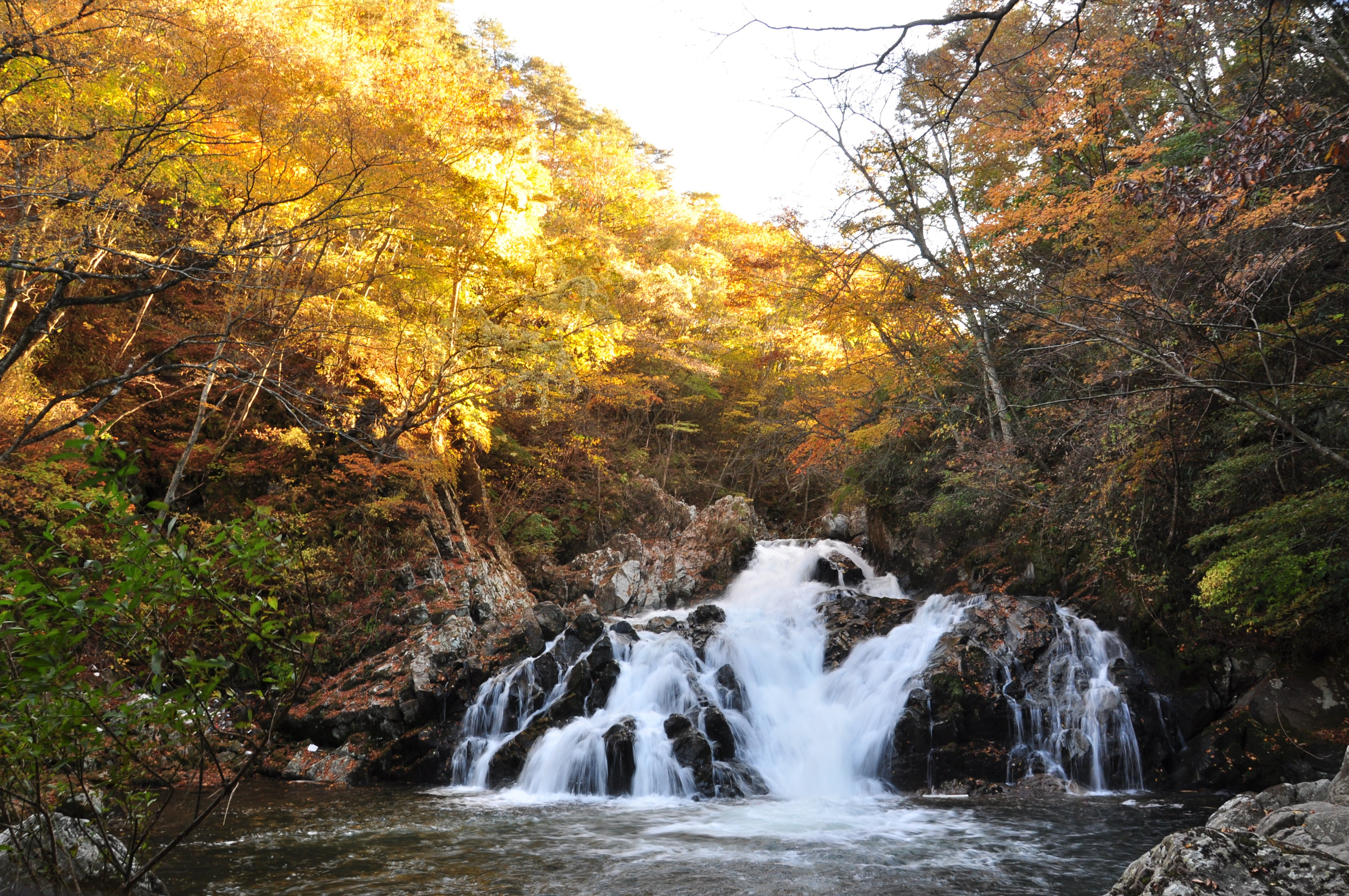
Nakano-Shiratake Falls in Hirono

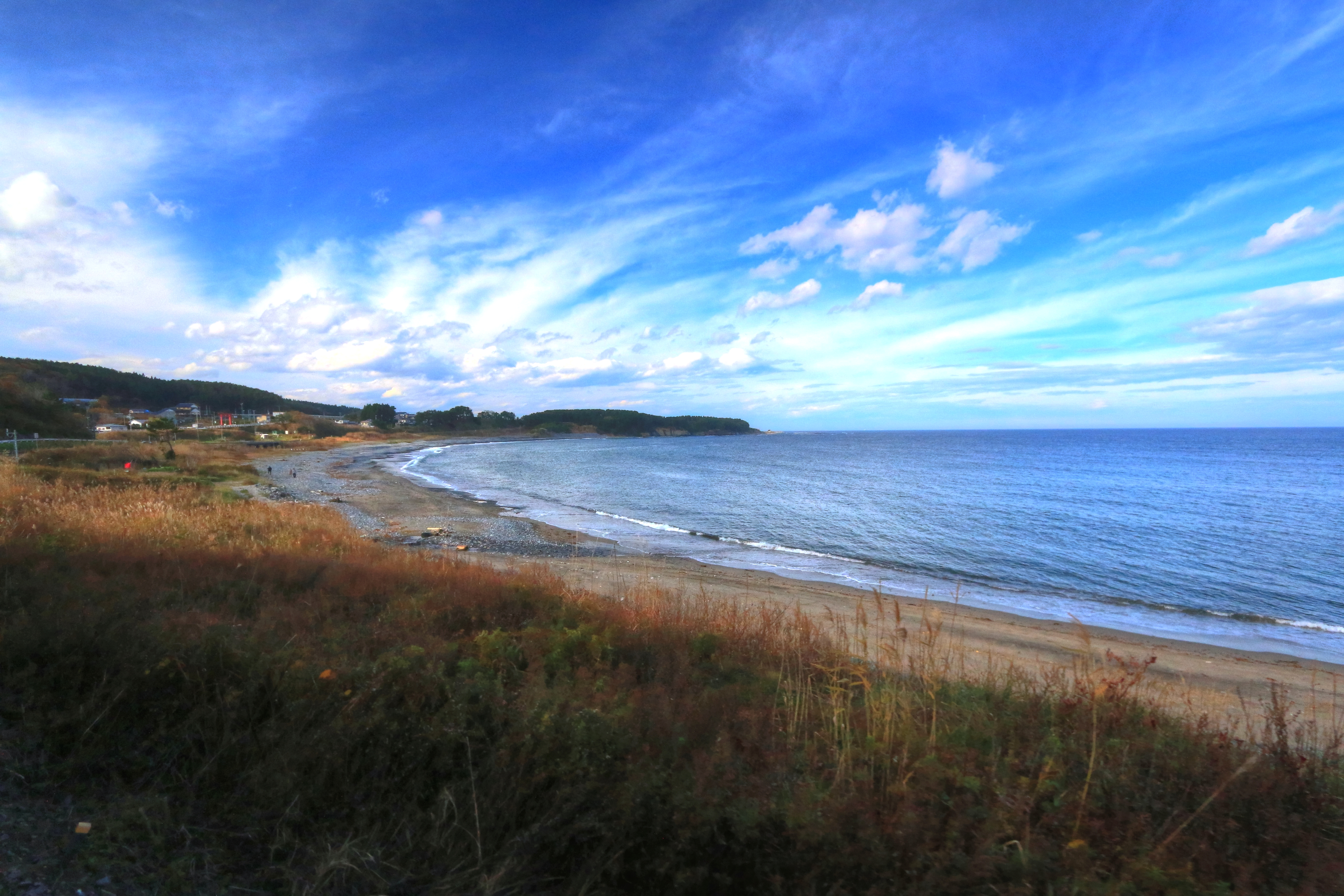
seacoast at Hirono

Hirono (洋野町, Hirono-chō) is a town located in Iwate Prefecture, Japan. As of 31 May 2024, the town had an estimated population of 14,906 in 6790 households, and a population density of 49 persons per km^{2} in 6,858 households. The total area of the town is 302.92 km^{2} (116.96 sq mi).

== Geography ==
Hirono is located in far northeastern Iwate Prefecture, bordered by Aomori Prefecture to the north and the Pacific Ocean to the east.

=== Neighboring municipalities ===
Aomori Prefecture

- Hashikami

Iwate Prefecture

- Karumai
- Kuji

=== Climate ===
Hirono has a humid subtropical climate (Köppen climate classification Cfa) characterized by mild summers and cold winters. The average annual temperature in Hirono is 9.5 °C. The average annual rainfall is 1168 mm with September as the wettest month and February as the driest month. The temperatures are highest on average in August, at around 22.3 °C, and lowest in January, at around -2.1 °C.

Climate data for Taneichi（1991 - 2020）
| Month | Jan | Feb | Mar | Apr | May | Jun | Jul | Aug | Sep | Oct | Nov | Dec | Year |
|---|---|---|---|---|---|---|---|---|---|---|---|---|---|
| Record high °C (°F) | 14.6 (58.3) | 19.9 (67.8) | 22.7 (72.9) | 30.7 (87.3) | 32.5 (90.5) | 33.1 (91.6) | 35.0 (95.0) | 35.4 (95.7) | 33.8 (92.8) | 27.5 (81.5) | 23.5 (74.3) | 19.6 (67.3) | 35.4 (95.7) |
| Mean daily maximum °C (°F) | 2.6 (36.7) | 3.3 (37.9) | 6.9 (44.4) | 12.8 (55.0) | 17.3 (63.1) | 19.5 (67.1) | 23.3 (73.9) | 25.1 (77.2) | 22.5 (72.5) | 17.4 (63.3) | 11.5 (52.7) | 5.2 (41.4) | 13.9 (57.0) |
| Daily mean °C (°F) | −0.9 (30.4) | −0.6 (30.9) | 2.4 (36.3) | 7.6 (45.7) | 12.2 (54.0) | 15.3 (59.5) | 19.5 (67.1) | 21.2 (70.2) | 18.3 (64.9) | 12.6 (54.7) | 6.7 (44.1) | 1.3 (34.3) | 9.6 (49.3) |
| Mean daily minimum °C (°F) | −4.2 (24.4) | −4.3 (24.3) | −1.8 (28.8) | 2.5 (36.5) | 7.5 (45.5) | 11.7 (53.1) | 16.4 (61.5) | 18.1 (64.6) | 14.6 (58.3) | 8.1 (46.6) | 2.3 (36.1) | −2.2 (28.0) | 5.7 (42.3) |
| Record low °C (°F) | −14.2 (6.4) | −12.7 (9.1) | −11.4 (11.5) | −7.4 (18.7) | −2.1 (28.2) | 1.1 (34.0) | 7.3 (45.1) | 8.0 (46.4) | 5.8 (42.4) | −0.9 (30.4) | −6.1 (21.0) | −11.4 (11.5) | −14.2 (6.4) |
| Average precipitation mm (inches) | 52.5 (2.07) | 51.5 (2.03) | 65.0 (2.56) | 74.4 (2.93) | 107.7 (4.24) | 130.4 (5.13) | 173.4 (6.83) | 176.3 (6.94) | 182.5 (7.19) | 129.7 (5.11) | 74.0 (2.91) | 59.2 (2.33) | 1,267 (49.88) |
| Average precipitation days (≥ 1.0 mm) | 8.0 | 8.1 | 9.2 | 9.2 | 10.7 | 10.9 | 13.2 | 13.0 | 11.4 | 9.6 | 9.0 | 7.7 | 120.0 |
| Mean monthly sunshine hours | 162.2 | 152.0 | 190.0 | 195.6 | 199.7 | 164.4 | 142.1 | 153.2 | 146.7 | 165.2 | 156.3 | 157.2 | 1,988.7 |
Source 1: Japan Meteorological Agency
Source 2: Japan Meteorological Agency

== Demographics ==
Per Japanese census data, the population of Hirono has declined over the past 40 years.

Historical population
| Year | Pop. | ±% |
|---|---|---|
| 1940 | 17,569 | — |
| 1950 | 22,316 | +27.0% |
| 1960 | 26,235 | +17.6% |
| 1970 | 24,278 | −7.5% |
| 1980 | 24,403 | +0.5% |
| 1990 | 22,802 | −6.6% |
| 2000 | 20,465 | −10.2% |
| 2010 | 17,913 | −12.5% |
| 2020 | 15,091 | −15.8% |

== History ==
The area of present-day Hirono was part of ancient Mutsu Province, and was dominated by the Nambu clan from the Muromachi period. During the Edo period, the area was part of Hachinohe Domain under the Tokugawa shogunate. In the early Meiji period, the villages of Taneichi, Nakano and Ōno within Kita-Kunohe District were created on April 1, 1889, with the establishment of the modern municipalities system. Kita-Kunohe District and Minami-Kunohe Districts merged to form Kunohe District on April 1, 1897. Taneichi was raised to town status on April 1, 1951, annexing the village of Nakano on February 11, 1955. Taneichi merged with Ōno on January 1, 2006, and was renamed Hirono. The new name, combining characters for "ocean" (洋) and "fields" (野), reflected the combination of coastal Taneichi with inland Ōno. The 2011 Tōhoku earthquake and tsunami severely damaged local fishing ports and destroyed some houses in coastal areas, but the center of the town was protected by a 12 metres (39 ft) embankment, and the town suffered no casualties in the disaster.

== Government ==
Hirono has a mayor-council form of government with a directly elected mayor and a unicameral town council of 16 members. Hirono, collectively with the city of Kuji and town of Noda, contributes two members to the Iwate Prefectural Assembly. In terms of national politics, the town is part of the Iwate 2nd district of the lower house of the Diet of Japan.

== Economy ==
Hirono is within the economic sphere of nearby Hachinohe, Aomori. The local economy is based on commercial fishing and to a lesser extent on agriculture (shiitake, spinach and rice).

== Education ==
Hirono has seven public elementary schools and three public middle schools operated by the town government, and two public high schools operated by the Iwate Prefectural Board of Education.

== Transportation ==
=== Railway ===
East Japan Railway Company (JR East) - Hachinohe Line

- Kadonohama - Hiranai - Taneichi - Tamagawa - Shukunohe - Rikuchū-Yagi - Uge - Rikuchū-Nakano

=== Highway ===
- National Route 45
- National Route 395

== Local attractions ==
- Symboli Ranch, specializing in race horses

=== Local specialties ===
Taneichi takes pride in its sea urchins. It is common in restaurants and has its own yearly festival in July, the Taneichi Sea Urchin Festival. Some of the sea urchins are harvested by means of Nanbu diving (南部もぐり), which is taught in a special program at Taneichi Senior High School. Sea pineapples (class Ascidiacea) are also harvested in Taneichi. Ōno takes pride in its various dairy products.

== Notable people from Hirono ==
- Ishinosuke Uwano – former Imperial Japanese Army soldier
- Kentaro Kudo – politician
