= Weppa Wanno =

Ethnic group / kingdom in Nigeria

Weppa Wanno is a Kingdom in present-day Etsako East local government area, in the South- South geopolitical zone of Nigeria. It is the homeland of Uwano people in the Etsako East local council administrative authority. Today, the people are traditionally ruled by two different clan kingship, the Weppa clan kingship and the Uwanno clan kingship. However, all the people of Weppa Wanno speak the same version of Etsako languages called Uwano dialect.

== Geography ==
It is bounded by Avianwu, Ibie, Ekperi, and Idah across the Niger River.

Weppa Wanno consists of several villages and towns, while the city of Agenebode serves as the capital and ancestral city of all Weppa Wanno people both at home and in diaspora. It is also the administrative headquarters of Etsako East Council. The River Niger flows to the east of this community. Unuedeghor, Emokweme, Oshiolo, Ekwotsor, Agiere, Itsokwi, Aviodor, Iviari, Ovao, Ivioghe, Iviukwe, Othame, Iviukhua, Igiode, Ivianokpodi, Iviebua, Iviegbepui, are names of some of the major villages that make up Weppa Wanno Kingdom.

== History ==
Administratively Weppa Wanno people were republicans, prior to colonial rule. The issue of kingship in Weppa Wanno is a modern-day creation. The clans were historically ruled by various Ukpi drummers before the incursion of the colonialists, and then the village head who oversees various towns and villages. After this is the family head.

The Okumagbe's stool was created through the Colonial Government Chief Commissioner's letter No. 12941108 of 27 May 1939, after the merger of Weppa and Wanno clans, and Chief Ogbaki 1, became the first monarch called Okumagbe which can be translated as the ‘unifier’. The throne of the Okumagbe is rotated among the five kinship groups. The present Okumagbe of Weppa Wanno is Dr. Eghabor a Chartered Accountant and industrialist, who is from the Iviokpisa kinship group. A History of Weppa-Wanno Land The peoples of Weppa-Wanno moved out of Benin during the Exodus and occupied their present location in the sixteenth century. The period was called "Exodus" because a lot of other tribes such as the Ishans, Akoko-Edos, Urhobos, Agbor the Onitsha people and parts of the Igbo speaking of Delta State also moved out of Benin. This was during the reign of Oba Ewuare the Great. The Oba was accused of being very strict and cruel to the people hence their exit from the Kingdom.

The Weppa-Wanno people were led out of Benin by General Adaobi who was a high ranking member of the Benin army at the time. The Benin army conquered a lot of tribes and communities and extended the frontiers of Benin kingdom. Other migrants were Okpisa, Amadi, Owai, Oke and Osomokhai. These families later founded kindred that were later grouped into ruling houses.

One good innovation of Weppa-Wanno people that is still evident till today and is unique in Etsako is the division of the land into two semi-autonomous sections. As a result historical events charted the evolution of a race known as Uweppa and Uwanno. It is also interesting to note that the people of Weppa-Wanno land are United by ties of consanguinity or blood relationship that predated their settlement in their present location in the sixteenth century.

Thus Agenebode emerged as a new Weppa –Wanno settlement in the second half of the nineteenth century. This was as a result of the proximity of Agenebode to the River Niger. Another was the opportunity to fish in the Niger, to trade and engage in commercial activities with both the Europeans and others.

Agenegbode was an "epithet" meaning "we will no longer (wish to) pass ourselves". In other words this is our final abode. This epithet was believed to be an expression of both tiredness and unwillingness by the Weppa-Wanno people to move beyond Agenebode in search of other new locations to settle in Etsako territory in the sixteenth century.

Thus, Agenebode became the official name of this little community that arose from a small fishing and trading post to a major European merchant capital in the era of legitimate trade before 1870.

Geographically therefore, Weppa-Wanno land is situated in the north-eastern part of Etsako territory, bounded in the West by Okpekpe clan, in the South by Avianwu clan, in the north by Okene in Ebira land, and in the east by the River Niger and Idah in Igala land.

The Weppa-Wanno people are easy going with rich cultural heritage that could be harnessed for the development and exposure of the land and the entire country.
