= Nishine, Iwate =

Nishine 西根町
- Former municipality
- Flag Emblem

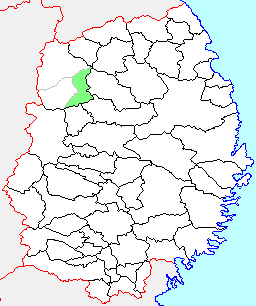
- Location of Nishine in Iwate Prefecture

- Location in Japan
- Coordinates: 39°55′34.5″N 141°05′44″E
- Country: Japan
- Region: Tōhoku
- Prefecture: Iwate Prefecture
- District: Iwate
- Merged: September 1, 2005 (now part of Hachimantai)

Area
  - Total: 167.16 km^{2} (64.54 sq mi)

Population (September 1, 2005)
  - Total: 18,442
  - Density: 110.3/km^{2} (286/sq mi)
- Time zone: UTC+09:00 (JST)
- Symbols
- Bird: Green pheasant
- Flower: Lithospermum purpurocaeruleum
- Tree: Pinus densiflora

Nishine (西根町, Nishine-chō) was a town located in Iwate District, Iwate Prefecture, Japan.

The villages of Tairadate, Ōbuke, Dendō and Terada were created on April 1, 1889, within Kita-Iwate District with the establishment of the municipality system. Kita-Iwate and Minami-Iwate Districts merged to form Iwate District on March 29, 1898. The four villages merged on September 30, 1956, to create the village of Nishine, which was elevated to town status on November 1, 1961. On September 1, 2005, Nishine, along with the town of Ashiro, and the village of Matsuo (all from Iwate District), was merged to create the city of Hachimantai and no longer exists as an independent municipality.

As of September 2005, the town had an estimated population of 18,442 and a population density of 110.3 persons per km^{2}. The total area was 167.16 km^{2}.
