= Shukunohe Station =

Railway station in Hirono, Iwate Prefecture, Japan

Shukunohe Station 宿戸駅
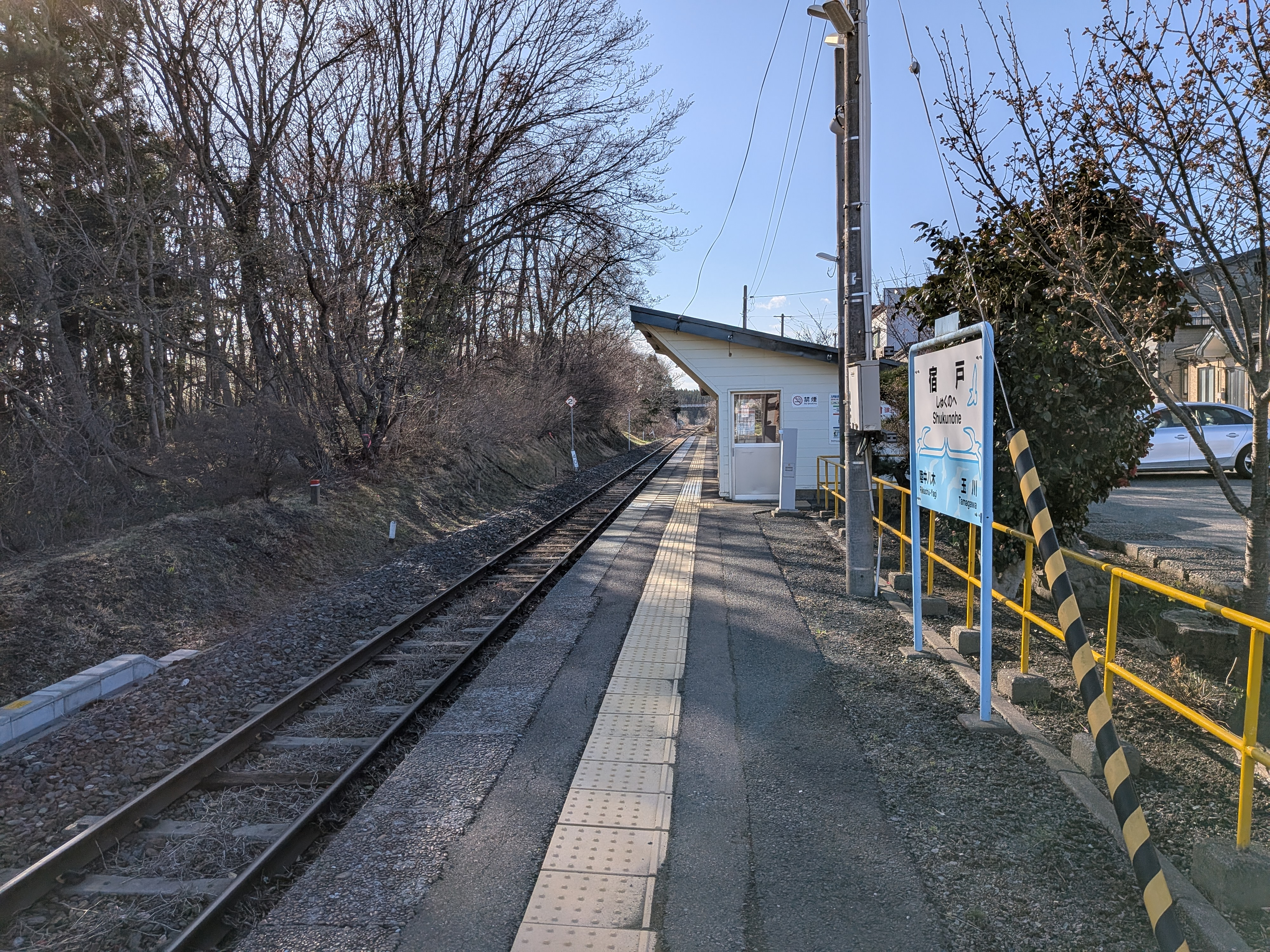
- Shukunohe Station in April 2026

General information
- Location: 117-17, 7th Jiwari, Taneichi, Hirono-machi, Kunohe-gun, Iwate-ken 028-7900; Japan
- Coordinates: 40.3661°N 141.7468°E
- Operator: JR East
- Line: ■ Hachinohe Line
- Distance: 40.0 km from Hachinohe
- Platforms: 1 side platform
- Tracks: 1

Construction
- Structure type: At grade

Other information
- Status: Unstaffed
- Website: Official website

History
- Opened: 5 August 1954

Services
Preceding station	JR East	Following station
Tamagawa towards Hachinohe	Hachinohe Line	Rikuchū-Yagi towards Kuji
Location
- Location within Iwate Prefecture Location within Japan

Shukunohe Station (宿戸駅, Shukunohe-eki) is a railway station on the Hachinohe Line in the town of Hirono, Kunohe District, Iwate Prefecture, Japan. It is operated by the East Japan Railway Company (JR East).is a passenger railway station located in the town of Hirono, Kunohe District, Iwate Prefecture, Japan. It is operated by the East Japan Railway Company (JR East).

== Lines ==
Shukunohe Station is served by the Hachinohe Line, and is 40.1 kilometers from the terminus of the line at Hachinohe Station.

== Station layout ==
Shukunohe Station has a single ground-level side platform serving one bi-directional track. There is a small shelter built on top of the platform, but there is no station building. The station is unattended.

== History ==
Shukunohe Station opened on August 5, 1954. On the privatization of Japanese National Railways (JNR) on April 1, 1987, the station came under the operational control of JR East.

== Surrounding area ==
- Hirono Town Shukudo Elementary School
- National Route 45

== See also ==
- List of railway stations in Japan
