= Rikuchū-Yagi Station =

Railway station in Hirono, Iwate Prefecture, Japan

Rikuchū-Yagi Station 陸中八木駅
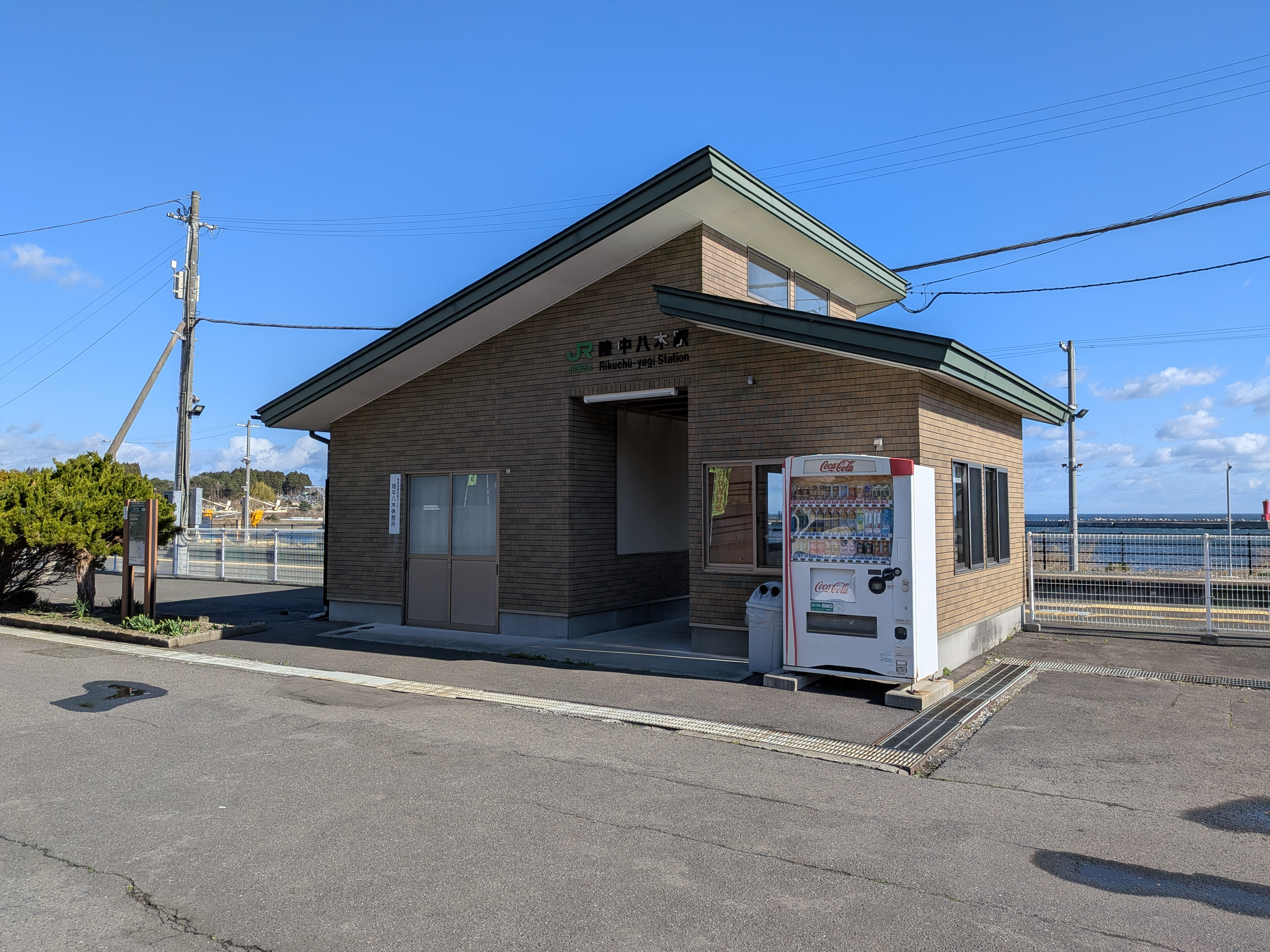
- Rikuchū-Yagi station building in April 2026

General information
- Location: 1-114 Taneichi, Taneichi, Hirono-machi, Kunohe-gun, Iwate-ken 028-7900; Japan
- Coordinates: 40°20′43″N 141°46′00″E
- Operator: JR East
- Line: ■ Hachinohe Line
- Distance: 43.1 km from Hachinohe
- Platforms: 2 side platforms
- Tracks: 2

Construction
- Structure type: At grade

Other information
- Status: Unstaffed
- Website: Official website

History
- Opened: 1 November 1925
- Rebuilt: 2008

Services
Preceding station	JR East	Following station
Shukunohe towards Hachinohe	Hachinohe Line	Uge towards Kuji
Location
- Location within Iwate Prefecture Location within Japan

Rikuchū-Yagi Station (陸中八木駅, Rikuchū-Yagi-eki) is a passenger railway station located in the town of Hirono, Kunohe District, Iwate Prefecture, Japan. It is operated by the East Japan Railway Company (JR East).

== Lines ==
Rikuchū-Yagi Station is served by the Hachinohe Line, and is 43.1 kilometers from the terminus of the line at Hachinohe Station.

== Station layout ==
Rikuchū-Yagi Station has two opposed ground-level side platforms serving two tracks. The platforms are connected to the station building by a level crossing. The station is unattended.

=== Platforms ===
1	■ Hachinohe Line	for Taneichi and Hachinohe
2	■ Hachinohe Line	for Kuji

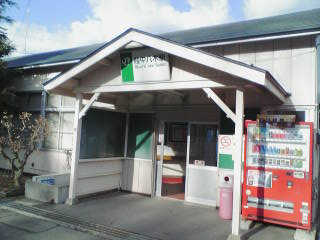
The former station building in November 2007

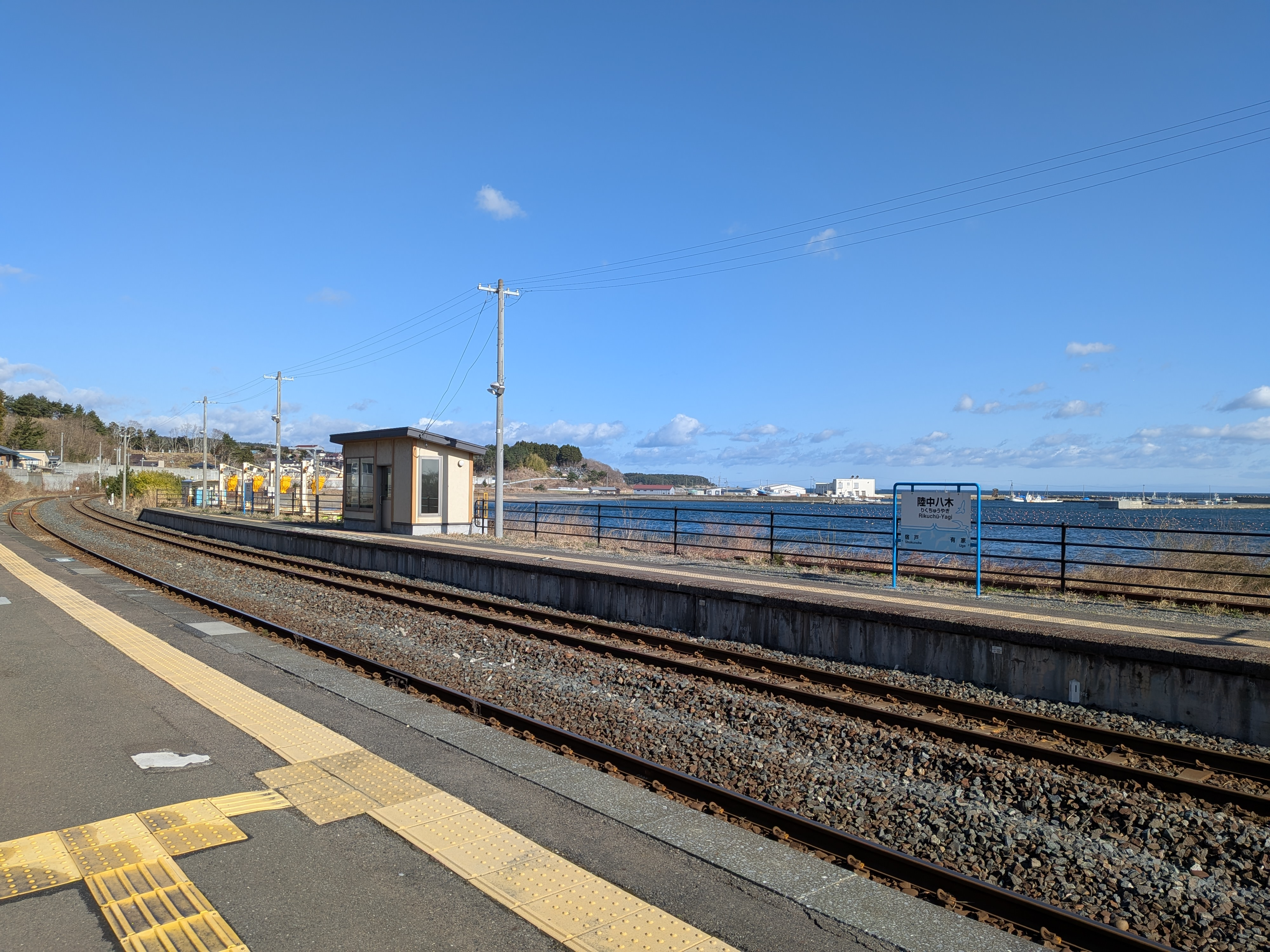
Platform, April 2026

== History ==
Rikuchū-Yagi Station opened on 1 November 1925. With the privatization of Japanese National Railways (JNR) on 1 April 1987, the station came under the control of JR East. A new station building and waiting room was completed in March 2008.

== Surrounding area ==
- Yagi Post Office
- National Route 45

== See also ==
- List of railway stations in Japan
