= Kentaro Kudo =

Japanese politician (1942–2021)

- 工藤 堅太郎

Member of the House of Councillors
- In office 26 July 2004 – 25 July 2010
- Constituency: National PR

Member of the House of Representatives
- In office 26 June 2000 – 10 October 2003
- Constituency: Tohoku PR
- In office 19 July 1993 – 27 September 1996
- Preceded by: Kuniki Yamanaka
- Succeeded by: Constituency established
- Constituency: Iwate 1st

Member of the Iwate Prefectural Assembly
- In office 1979–1993
- Constituency: Kunohe District

Personal details
- Born: 13 October 1942 Taneichi, Iwate, Japan
- Died: 24 March 2021 (aged 78) Morioka, Iwate, Japan
- Party: Democratic
- Other political affiliations: LDP (1979–1993); JRP (1993–1994); NFP (1994–1998); LP (1998–2003)
- Education: Chuo University

Kentaro Kudo (工藤 堅太郎, Kudō Kentarō; October 13, 1942 – March 24, 2021) was a Japanese politician of the Democratic Party of Japan, a member of the House of Councillors in the Diet (national legislature). A native of Kunohe District, Iwate and graduate of Chuo University, he was elected to the House of Representatives for the first time in 1993 as a member of Japan Renewal Party after serving in the Iwate Prefectural Assembly for four terms. In 1996 he lost his seat but was re-elected in 2000. After losing his seat again in 2003, he ran for House of Councillors in 2004 and was elected.
