= Jōbōji, Iwate =

Jōbōji 浄法寺町
- Former municipality
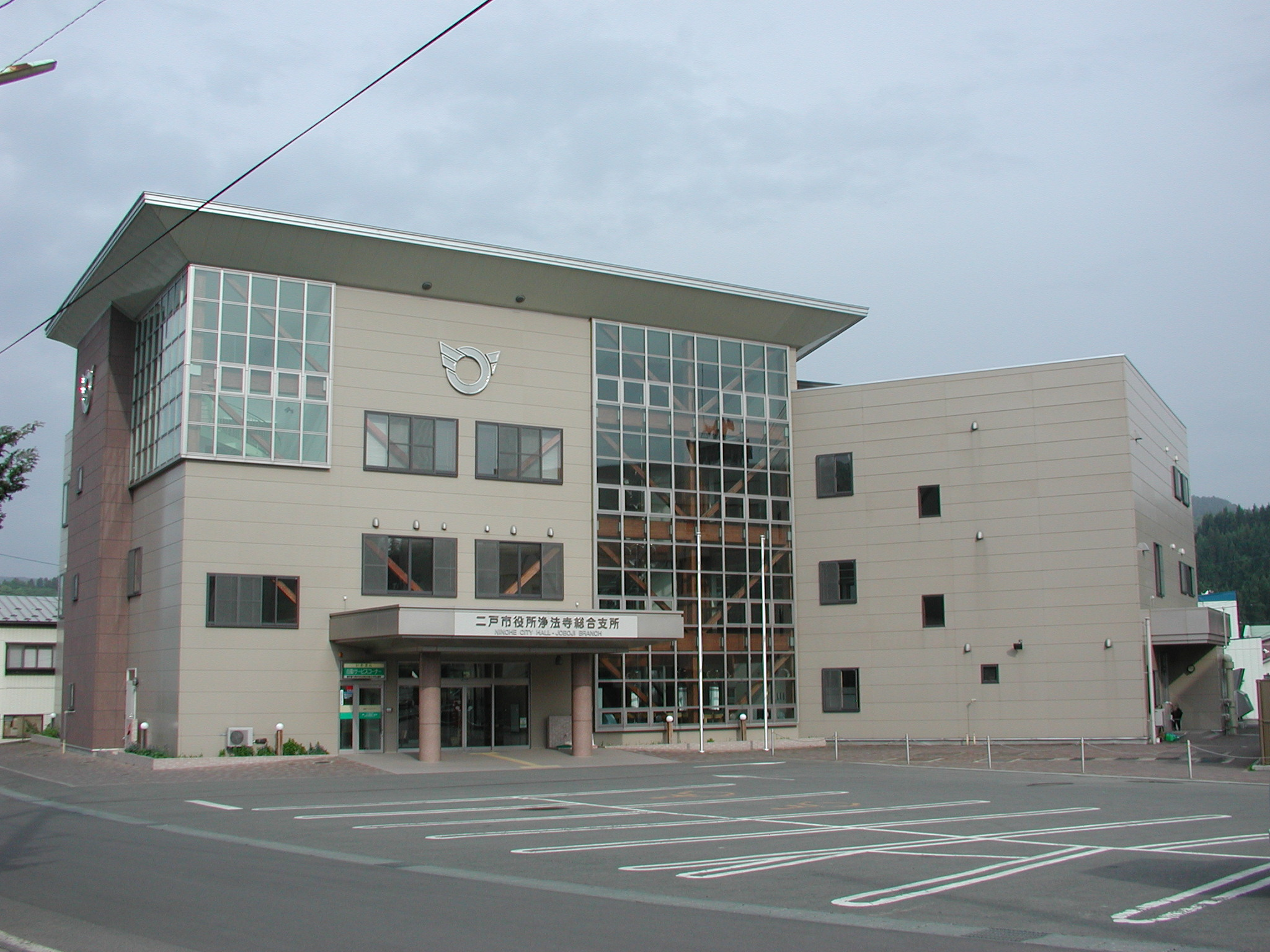
- former Jōbōji Town Hall

- Flag Emblem

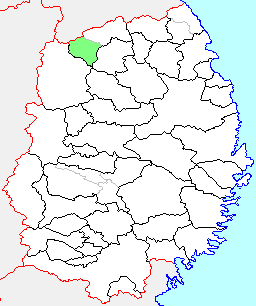
- Location of Jōbōji in Iwate Prefecture

- Location in Japan
- Coordinates: 40°11′N 141°09′E
- Country: Japan
- Region: Tōhoku
- Prefecture: Iwate Prefecture
- District: Iwate
- Merged: September 1, 2005 (now part of Ninohe)

Area
  - Total: 179.70 km^{2} (69.38 sq mi)

Population (January 1, 2006)
  - Total: 4,959
  - Density: 27.6/km^{2} (71/sq mi)
- Time zone: UTC+09:00 (JST)
- Symbols
- Bird: Common cuckoo
- Flower: Platycodon grandiflorus
- Tree: Cercidiphyllum japonicum

Jōbōji (浄法寺町, Jōbōji-machi) was a town located in Ninohe District, Iwate Prefecture, Japan.

The village of Jōbōji was created on April 1, 1889 within Ninohe District with the establishment of the municipality system. Jōbōji was raised to town status on December 25, 1940. On January 1, 2006, Jōbōji was merged into the expanded city of Ninohe, and no longer exists as an independent municipality.

As of January 2006, the town had an estimated population of 4,959 and a population density of 27.6 persons per km^{2}. The total area was 179.70 km^{2}.
