= Ninohe District, Iwate =

District in Japan, in prefecture Iwate

Coordinates: 40°16′N 141°16′E

- List of Provinces of Japan > Tōsandō > Mutsu Province > Ninohe District
- Japan > Tōhoku region > Iwate Prefecture > Ninohe District

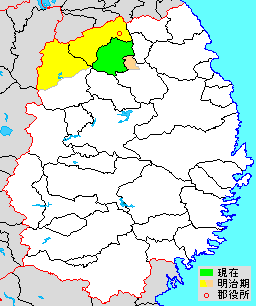
Map showing original extent of Ninohe District in Iwate Prefecture colored area=original extent in Meiji period; green=present area; beige=area transferred to Iwate District

Ninohe (二戸郡, Ninohe-gun) is a rural district located in Iwate Prefecture, Japan.

As of June 1, 2019, the district has an estimated population of 11,797 with a density of 39.3 per km^{2} and an area of 300.03 km^{2}. The entire city of Ninohe, and parts of the city of Hachimantai and town of Kuzumaki were formerly part of Ninohe District.

== Towns and villages ==
The district consists of one town:

- Ichinohe

== History ==
The ancient county of Nukanobu (糠部郡, Nikanobu-gun) in Mutsu Province was divided into the counties of Ninohe, Sannohe, Kunohe and Kita in 1634. Under the Tokugawa shogunate, Ninohe county consisted of 74 villages under the control of Morioka Domain. Following the Meiji restoration, Ninohe came under Aomori Prefecture from December 1871 to May 1876, when it became part of Iwate Prefecture.

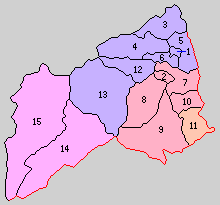
Historic Map of Ninohe District: Purple= Ninohe City: 1. Fukuoka; 3. Kindaichi; 4. Tomai; 5. Nissatai; 6. Ishikiridokoro; 12. Gohenji; 13. Jōbōji; Peach=Ichinohe Town: 2. Ichinohe; 7. Namiuta; 8. Chōkai; 9. Kozuya; 10. Anetai; Orange=Kuzumaki Town: 11. Tabe; Red=Hachimantai City: 14. Arasawa; 15. Tayama;

=== Timeline ===
- April 1, 1889 – With the establishment of the municipality system, Ninohe was organized into two 2 towns (Fukuoka and Ichinohe) and 13 villages)
  - Town of Fukuoka, villages of Kintaichi, Tomai, Nisattai, Ishikiridokoro, Gohenji, and Jōbōji (now the city of Ninohe)
  - Town of Ichinohe, villages of Namiutai, Chōkai, Anetai, and Kozuya (now the town of Ichinohe)
  - Village of Arazawa and Tayama (now the city of Hachimantai)
  - Village of Tabe (now the town of Kuzumak)
- December 25, 1940 - Jōbōji was raised to town status (3 towns, 12 villages)
- March 10, 1955 - The town of Fukuoka annexed the villages of Tomai, Nisattai, Ishikiridokoro, and Gohenji. (3 towns, 8 villages)
- July 5, 1955 - The village of Tabe merged with the town of Kuzumaki and the village of Ekari in Iwate District. (3 towns, 7 villages)
- September 30, 1956 - The villages of Arazawa and Tayama merged to form the town of Ashiro. (4 towns, 5 villages)
- November 1, 1957 - The town of Ichinohe annexed the villages of Namiuchi?(浪打), Chōkai, Anetai, and Kozuya. (4 towns, 1 village)
- April 1, 1972 - The town of Fukuoka and the village of Kintaichi merged to form the city of Ninohe. (3 towns)
- April 1, 2002 - The town of Ashiro transferred to Iwate District. (2 towns)
- January 1, 2006 - The town of Jōbōji was annexed by the city of Ninohe. (1 town)
