= Matsuo, Iwate =

Matsuo 松尾村
- Former municipality
- Flag Emblem

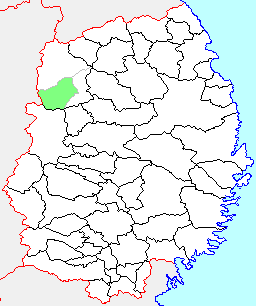
- Location of Matsuo in Iwate Prefecture

- Location in Japan
- Coordinates: 39°57′12.4″N 141°03′57.2″E
- Country: Japan
- Region: Tōhoku
- Prefecture: Iwate Prefecture
- District: Iwate
- Merged: September 1, 2005 (now part of Hachimantai)

Area
  - Total: 234.85 km^{2} (90.68 sq mi)

Population (September 1, 2005)
  - Total: 6,786
  - Density: 28.89/km^{2} (74.8/sq mi)
- Time zone: UTC+09:00 (JST)
- Symbols
- Bird: Copper pheasant
- Flower: Lithospermum purpurocaeruleum
- Tree: Pinus densiflora

Matsuo (松尾村, Matsuo-mura) was a village located in Iwate District, Iwate Prefecture, Japan.

The village of Matsuo was created on April 1, 1889 within Kita-Iwate District with the establishment of the municipality system. Kita-Iwate and Minami-Iwate Districts merged to form Iwate District on March 29, 1898. On September 1, 2005, Matsuo, along with the towns of Ashiro and Nishine (all from Iwate District), was merged to create the city of Hachimantai and no longer exists as an independent municipality.

Matsuo was formerly known as the home of Japan's largest sulfur mine—the Matsuo Kōzan —and, later, as the home of the Matsukawa geothermal power plant. The iron and copper Matsuo mine was also located there before abandonment in 1971.

As of September 2005, the village had an estimated population of 6,786 and a population density of 28.89 persons per km^{2}. The total area was 234.85 km^{2}.

== Sister cities ==
- (Japan) Miyako, Iwate
- (Japan) Nago, Okinawa

Friendship and cooperation cities:

- (Austria) Altenmarkt, Salzburg

== Local attractions ==
- Hachimantai hot spring resort
  - Toushichi hot spring
- Matsuogawa hot spring
- East Hachimantai onsen resort
- Kanezawa spring
