= Ashiro, Iwate =

Ashiro 安代町
- Former municipality
- Flag Emblem

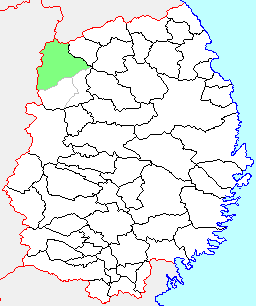
- Location of Ashiro in Iwate Prefecture

- Location in Japan
- Coordinates: 40°06′N 141°03′E
- Country: Japan
- Region: Tōhoku
- Prefecture: Iwate Prefecture
- District: Iwate
- Merged: September 1, 2005 (now part of Hachimantai)

Area
  - Total: 460.24 km^{2} (177.70 sq mi)

Population (September 1, 2005)
  - Total: 5,841
  - Density: 12.69/km^{2} (32.9/sq mi)
- Time zone: UTC+09:00 (JST)
- Symbols
- Bird: Copper pheasant
- Flower: Gentiana scabra
- Tree: Fagus crenata

Ashiro (安代町, Ashiro-chō) was a town located in Iwate District, Iwate Prefecture, Japan.

The villages of Arasawa and Tayama were created on April 1, 1889, within Ninohe District with the establishment of the municipality system. These villages merged on September 30, 1956, to create the town of Ashiro. On April 1, 2002, Ashiro was transferred from Ninohe District to Iwate District. On September 1, 2005, Ashiro, along with the town of Nishine, and the village of Matsuo (all from Iwate District), was merged to create the city of Hachimantai and no longer exists as an independent municipality.

As of September 2005, the town had an estimated population of 5,841 and a population density of 12.69 persons per km^{2}. The total area was 460.24 km^{2}.
