= Ōno, Iwate =

Ōno 大野村
- Former municipality
- Flag Emblem

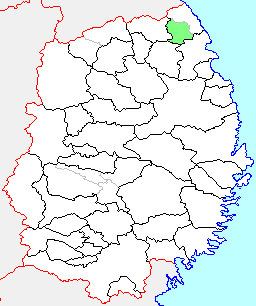
- Location of Ōno in Iwate Prefecture

- Location in Japan
- Coordinates: 40.284245°N 141.624903°E
- Country: Japan
- Region: Tōhoku
- Prefecture: Iwate Prefecture
- District: Kunohe
- Merged: April 1, 2005 (now part of Hirono)

Area
  - Total: 134.65 km^{2} (51.99 sq mi)

Population (March 1, 2005)
  - Total: 6,012
  - Density: 44.65/km^{2} (115.6/sq mi)
- Time zone: UTC+09:00 (JST)
- Symbols
- Bird: Eurasian skylark
- Flower: Gentiana scabra
- Tree: Japanese red pine

Ōno (大野村, Ōno-mura) was a village located in Kunohe District, Iwate Prefecture, Japan.

The village of Ōno was created on April 1, 1889 within Kita-Kunohe District with the establishment of the municipality system. Kita-Kunohe District and Minami-Kunohe Districts merged to form Kunohe District on April 1, 1897. On April 1, 2005, Ōno, merged with the town of Taneichi (also from Kunohe District) to create the new town of Hirono.

As of January 2006, the village had an estimated population of 6,012 and a population density of 44.65 persons per km^{2}. The total area was 134.65 km^{2}.
