= Oritsume Basenkyō Prefectural Natural Park =

Natural Park in Japan

- 折爪馬仙峡県立自然公園
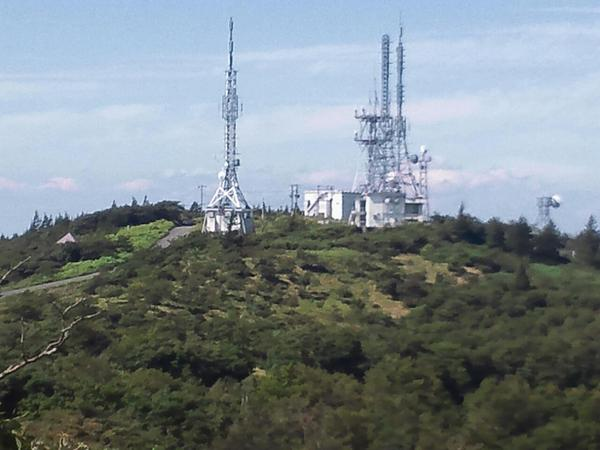
- Mount Oritsume
- Interactive map of Oritsume Basenkyō Prefectural Natural Park
- Location: Iwate Prefecture, Japan
- Coordinates: 40°16′08″N 141°22′33″E
- Area: 9.19 km^{2} (3.55 sq mi)
- Established: 27 November 1962

Oritsume Basenkyō Prefectural Natural Park (折爪馬仙峡県立自然公園, Oritsume Basenkyō kenritsu shizen kōen) is a Prefectural Natural Park in Iwate Prefecture, Japan. Established in 1962, the park spans the municipalities of Ninohe, Ichinohe and Kunohe. The central features of the park are Mount Oritsume (折爪岳) and Basenkyō Gorge (馬仙峡).

== See also ==
- National Parks of Japan
