= Kunohe, Iwate =

Kunohe 九戸村
- Village
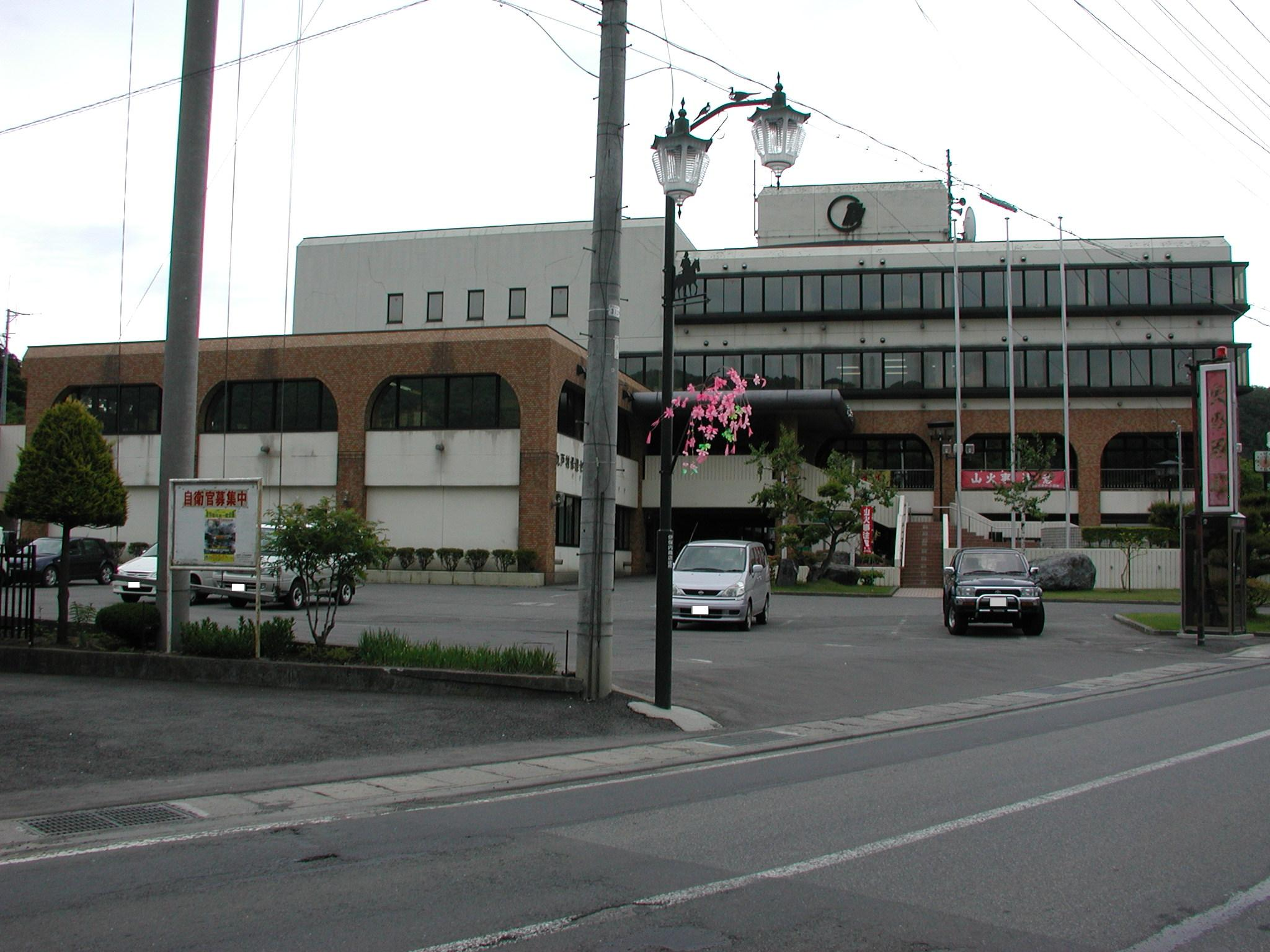
- Kunohe Village Hall

- Flag Seal

- Location of Kunohe in Iwate Prefecture

- Coordinates: 40°12′40.9″N 141°25′8.3″E
- Country: Japan
- Region: Tōhoku
- Prefecture: Iwate
- District: Kunohe

Area
  - Total: 134.02 km^{2} (51.75 sq mi)

Population (May 1, 2020)
  - Total: 5,650
  - Density: 42.2/km^{2} (109/sq mi)
- Time zone: UTC+9 (Japan Standard Time)
- City symbols
  - Tree: Japanese red pine
  - Flower: Rhododendron
  - Bird: Copper pheasant
- Phone number: 0195-42-2111
- Address: Ihonai dai-10 jiwari 11-6, Kunohe-mura, Kunohe-gun, Iwate 028-6502
- Website: Official website

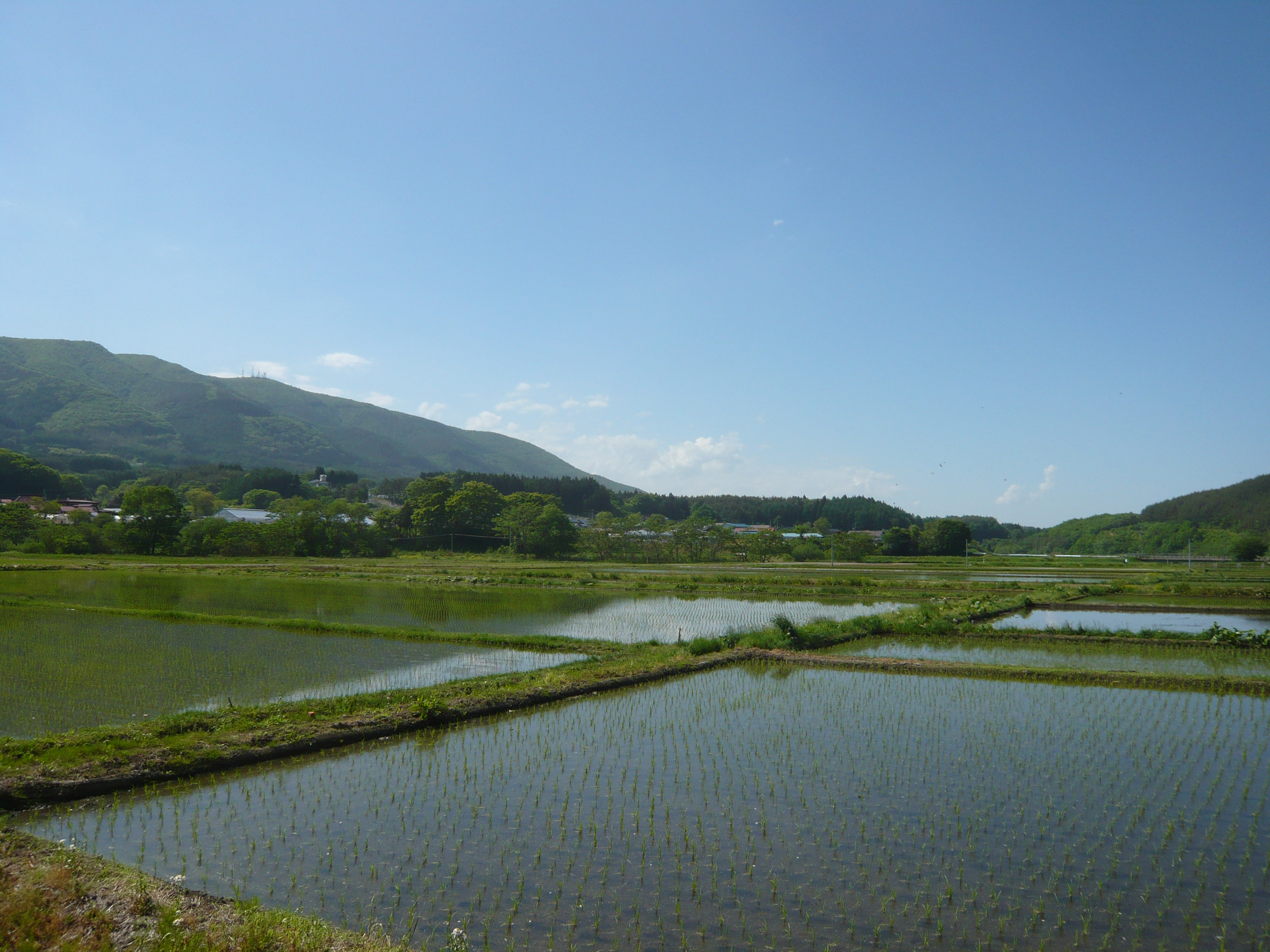
Ricefields in Kunohe

Kunohe (九戸村, Kunohe-mura) is a village located in Iwate Prefecture, Japan. As of 1 April 2020, the village had an estimated population of 5,650 in 2177 households, and a population density of 42/km^{2} (110/sq mi). The total area of the village was 134.02 square kilometres (51.75 sq mi).

== Geography ==
Kunohe is located in north-central Iwate Prefecture, within the Kitakami Mountains, in the river valley of the Niida River. Over 70 percent of the village area is covered by mountains and forests. Portions of the village are within the borders of the Oritsume Basenkyō Prefectural Natural Park.

=== Neighboring municipalities ===
Iwate Prefecture

- Ninohe
- Karumai
- Kuzumaki
- Ichinohe
- Kuji

=== Climate ===
Kunohe has a humid continental climate (Köppen climate classification Dfa) characterized by mild summers and cold winters with heavy snowfall. The average annual temperature in Kunohe is 8.9 °C. The average annual rainfall is 1280 mm with September as the wettest month and February as the driest month. The temperatures are highest on average in August, at around 22.0 °C, and lowest in January, at around -3.2 °C.

== Demographics ==
Per Japanese census data, the population of Kunohe peaked around the year 1960 and has declined steadily over the past 60 years.

Historical population
Year	Pop.	±%
1920	6,322	—
1930	6,934	+9.7%
1940	7,693	+10.9%
1950	9,120	+18.5%
1960	9,925	+8.8%
1970	8,775	−11.6%
1980	8,496	−3.2%
1990	7,985	−6.0%
2000	7,324	−8.3%
2010	6,510	−11.1%
2020	5,378	−17.4%

== History ==
The area of present-day Kunohe was part of ancient Mutsu Province, dominated by the Nambu clan from the Muromachi period, and part of Hachinohe Domain under the Edo period Tokugawa shogunate. During the early Meiji period, the villages of Toda, Ibonai and Esashika were created within Kita-Kunohe District on April 1, 1889, with the establishment of the modern municipalities system. Kita-Kunohe District and Minami-Kunohe Districts merged to form Kunohe District on April 1, 1897. The three villages merged to form the modern village of Kunohe on April 1, 1955.

== Economy ==
The economy of Kunohe is based on agriculture, the production of charcoal and animal husbandry, primarily poultry. The village is famous for its production of amacha.

== Government ==
Kunohe has a mayor-council form of government with a directly elected mayor and a unicameral village council of 12 members. Ichinohe, and the city of Ninohe together contribute two seats to the Iwate Prefectural legislature. In terms of national politics, the village is part of Iwate 2nd district of the lower house of the Diet of Japan.

== Education ==
Kunohe has five public elementary schools and one public middle school operated by the village government. There is one public high school operated by the Iwate Prefectural Board of Education.

== Transportation ==
=== Railway ===
Kunohe does not have any passenger train service.

=== Highway ===
- Hachinohe Expressway – Kunohe Interchange
- National Route 340
