= Uwano =

Uwano is a surname. Notable people with the surname include:

- Ishinosuke Uwano (1922–2013), Japanese soldier
- Minami Uwano (born 1991), Japanese racing cyclist
- Takashi Uwano (born 1976), Japanese professional wrestler
