= Yamagata, Iwate =

Yamagata 山形村
- Former municipality
- Flag Emblem

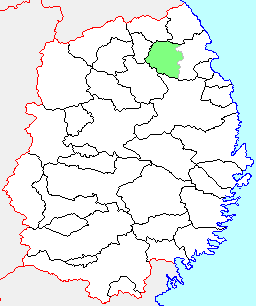
- Location of Yamagata in Iwate Prefecture

- Location in Japan
- Coordinates: 40°08′55″N 141°31′18″E
- Country: Japan
- Region: Tōhoku
- Prefecture: Iwate Prefecture
- District: Kunohe
- Merged: April 1, 2005 (now part of Kuji)

Area
  - Total: 295.49 km^{2} (114.09 sq mi)

Population (March 1, 2006)
  - Total: 3,121
  - Density: 7.89/km^{2} (20.4/sq mi)
- Time zone: UTC+09:00 (JST)
- Climate: Dfb
- Symbols
- Bird: Copper pheasant
- Flower: Japanese azalea
- Tree: Japanese white birch

Yamagata (山形村, Yamagata-mura) was a village located in Kunohe District, Iwate Prefecture, Japan.

The village of Yamagata was created on April 1, 1889 within Kita-Kunohe District with the establishment of the municipality system. Kita-Kunohe District and Minami-Kunohe Districts merged to form Kunohe District on April 1, 1897. The mountainous area was formerly known for a number of mines, especially ironsand. On March 6, 2006, Yamagata was merged into the expanded city of Kuji.

As of March 1, 2006, the village had an estimated population of 3,121 and a population density of 7.89 persons per km^{2}. The total area was 295.49 km^{2}.

== Climate ==
Climate data for Yamagata, Iwate (1991−2020 normals, extremes 1977−present)
Month	Jan	Feb	Mar	Apr	May	Jun	Jul	Aug	Sep	Oct	Nov	Dec	Year
Record high °C (°F)	13.3 (55.9)	17.0 (62.6)	20.9 (69.6)	28.5 (83.3)	34.1 (93.4)	33.7 (92.7)	35.6 (96.1)	36.4 (97.5)	33.9 (93.0)	28.7 (83.7)	24.4 (75.9)	20.4 (68.7)	36.4 (97.5)
Mean daily maximum °C (°F)	1.2 (34.2)	2.1 (35.8)	6.3 (43.3)	13.3 (55.9)	19.2 (66.6)	21.9 (71.4)	25.3 (77.5)	26.4 (79.5)	22.7 (72.9)	17.1 (62.8)	10.8 (51.4)	4.0 (39.2)	14.2 (57.5)
Daily mean °C (°F)	−2.7 (27.1)	−2.2 (28.0)	1.3 (34.3)	7.3 (45.1)	12.9 (55.2)	16.4 (61.5)	20.3 (68.5)	21.3 (70.3)	17.3 (63.1)	10.9 (51.6)	5.2 (41.4)	−0.2 (31.6)	9.0 (48.1)
Mean daily minimum °C (°F)	−7.2 (19.0)	−7.0 (19.4)	−3.9 (25.0)	1.1 (34.0)	6.4 (43.5)	11.1 (52.0)	16.2 (61.2)	17.1 (62.8)	12.6 (54.7)	5.3 (41.5)	−0.2 (31.6)	−4.5 (23.9)	3.9 (39.1)
Record low °C (°F)	−17.8 (0.0)	−21.7 (−7.1)	−18.1 (−0.6)	−11.6 (11.1)	−3.7 (25.3)	−1.0 (30.2)	4.9 (40.8)	4.4 (39.9)	0.8 (33.4)	−4.9 (23.2)	−10.0 (14.0)	−15.0 (5.0)	−21.7 (−7.1)
Average precipitation mm (inches)	52.5 (2.07)	47.5 (1.87)	66.2 (2.61)	64.5 (2.54)	79.1 (3.11)	92.0 (3.62)	164.5 (6.48)	172.0 (6.77)	160.9 (6.33)	125.0 (4.92)	58.7 (2.31)	62.2 (2.45)	1,133 (44.61)
Average precipitation days (≥ 1.0 mm)	10.7	10.6	11.8	10.5	10.8	10.7	14.2	12.9	12.3	11.0	10.4	11.1	137
Mean monthly sunshine hours	111.9	121.3	167.7	191.1	207.1	171.8	138.2	157.6	140.1	153.8	131.4	109.9	1,801.9
Source: Japan Meteorological Agency
