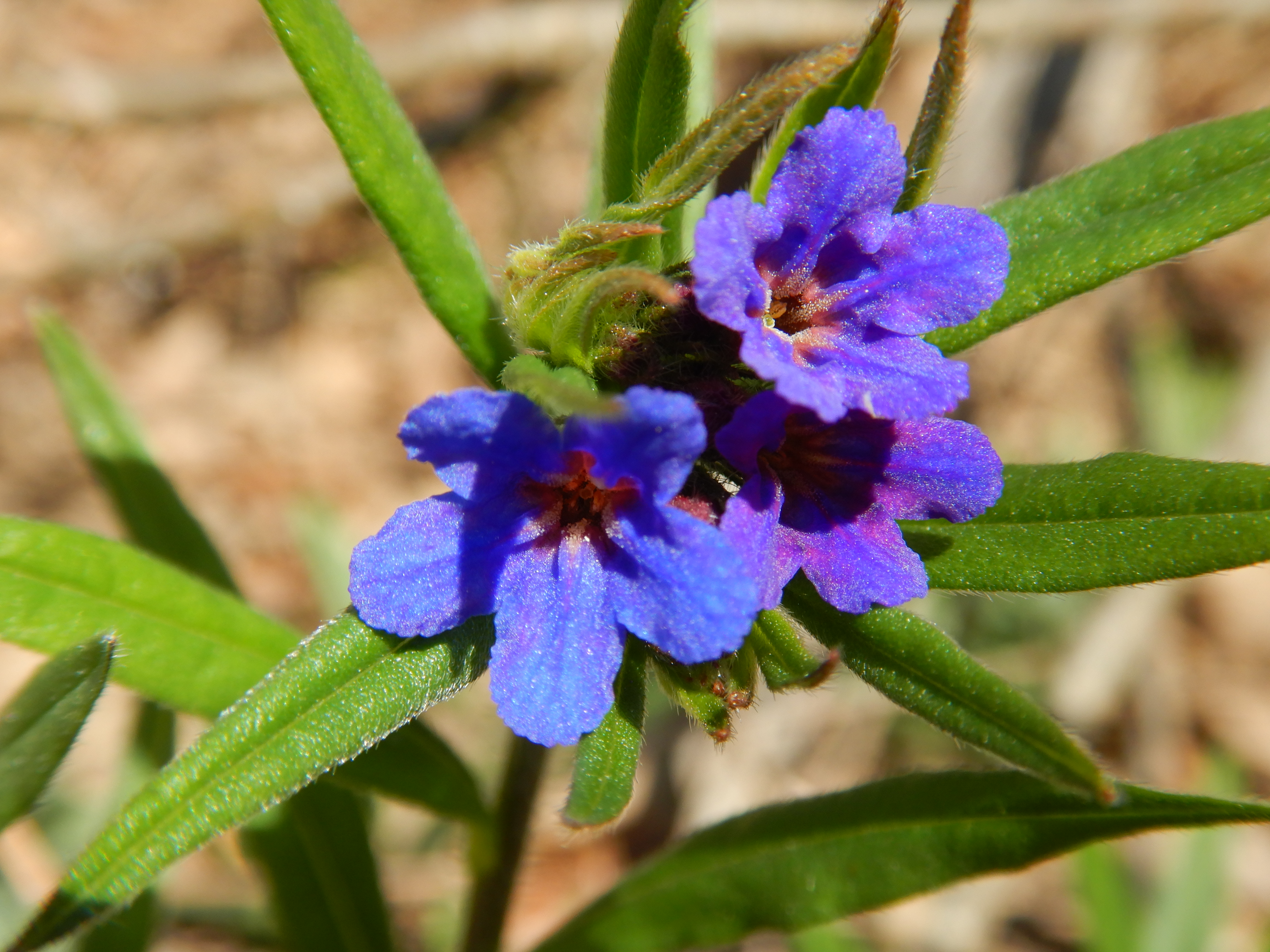
- Aegonychon purpurocaeruleum

Scientific classification
- Kingdom: Plantae
- Clade: Tracheophytes
- Clade: Angiosperms
- Clade: Eudicots
- Clade: Asterids
- Order: Boraginales
- Family: Boraginaceae
- Genus: Aegonychon; Gray

Synonyms
- Margarospermum (Rchb.) Opiz

= Aegonychon =

Genus of flowering plants

Aegonychon is a genus of flowering plants belonging to the family Boraginaceae.

Its native range is from Europe to Iran, and central China to temperate eastern Asia.

Species:

- Aegonychon calabrum (Ten.) ined.
- Aegonychon purpurocaeruleum (L.) Holub
- Aegonychon zollingeri (DC.) Holub
