= Tamayama, Iwate =

Tamayama 玉山村
- Former municipality
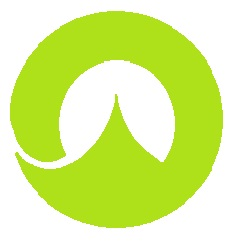
- Flag Seal

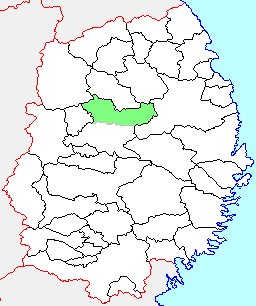
- Location of Tamayama in Iwate Prefecture

- Location in Japan
- Coordinates: 39°50′48.5″N 141°9′58.4″E
- Country: Japan
- Region: Tōhoku
- Prefecture: Iwate Prefecture
- District: Iwate
- Merged: June 6, 2005 (now part of Morioka)

Area
  - Total: 397.32 km^{2} (153.41 sq mi)

Population (January 10, 2006)
  - Total: 13,530
  - Density: 34.05/km^{2} (88.2/sq mi)
- Time zone: UTC+09:00 (JST)
- Symbols
- Bird: Green pheasant
- Flower: Lily of the valley
- Tree: Cryptomeria

Tamayama (玉山村, Tamayama-mura) was a village located in Iwate District, Iwate Prefecture, Japan.

== History ==
Tamayama was created as an administrative entity on April 1, 1889, within Minami-Iwate District with the establishment of the municipality system. The new administrative entity merged three pre-existing villages: Tamayama, Hinoto (日戸村), and Kawamata (川又村). Minami-Iwate merged with Kita-Iwate District to form Iwate District on March 29, 1896. Tamayama merged with the neighboring villages of Shibutami and Yabukawa on April 1, 1954, and with Makihori on June 1, 1955. On January 10, 2006, Tamayama was merged into the expanded city of Morioka and no longer exists as an independent municipality.

As of January 2006, the village had an estimated population of 13,530 and a population density of 34.05 persons per km^{2}. The total area was 397.32 km^{2}.
