= Emokweme =

Nigerian town

Emokweme is a town in Weppa Wanno Kingdom of Edo state, Nigeria. It is located in Etsako East local government of Edo State.

The people speak Etsako with Weppa Wanno dialect.

Emokweme, alongside their other siblings of Igegbode, Unueda make up the iviokpisa kinship group of Weppa Wanno, and they are the original settlers at Agenebode.

The now suspended traditional Ruler 'Okumagbe' of Weppa Wanno Kingdom, Dr. George Oshiapi Egabor is from Emokweme (Iviokpisa kinship group).
