= Iwate District, Iwate =

District in Iwate prefecture, Japan

Coordinates: 39°48′37″N 141°07′22″E

- List of Provinces of Japan > Tōsandō > Rikuchū Province > Iwate District
- Japan > Tōhoku region > Iwate Prefecture > Iwate District

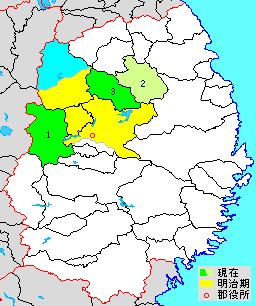
Map showing original extent of Iwate District in Iwate Prefecture colored area=original extent in Meiji period; green=present area (1=Shizukuishi, 2=Kuzumaki, 3=Iwate); blue=area transferred from Ninohe District; light green=area transferred from Kunohe District

Iwate (岩手郡, Iwate-gun) is a rural district located in Iwate Prefecture, Japan.

As of June 1, 2019, the district has an estimated population of 34,416 with a density of 24.5 per km^{2} and an area of 1404.24 km^{2}. The entire city of Takizawa, the southern half of the city of Hachimantai and most of the city of Morioka were formerly part of Iwate District.

== Towns and villages ==
The district consists of three towns:

- Iwate
- Kuzumaki
- Shizukuishi

== History ==
=== Under Mutsu Province ===
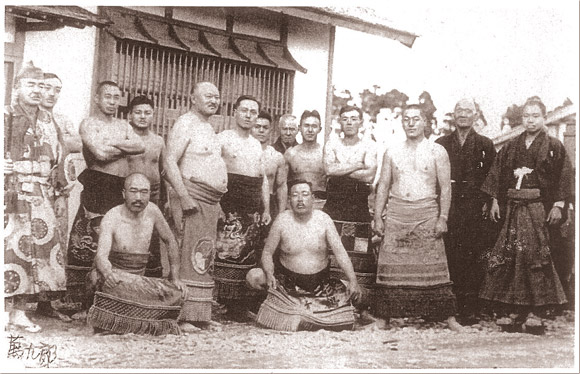
Sumo wrestlers from throughout Iwate-gun, c.1945.

Iwate District was the northernmost of the six districts of northern Mutsu Province (六奥郡) created in the early Heian period after the conquest of the Kitakami River Valley from the Emishi tribes by the Japanese army led by General Sakanoue no Tamuramaro. The districts were named by Emperor Heizei, and the name of “Iwate” was originally written with the kanji 磐手, and appears in this form in the Yamato Monogatari, compiled in the year 951. By the middle Heian period, the kanji had changed to its present form, although it was also occasionally referred to as ‘Iwadenomori' (岩出の森郡).

Iwate District was the northern frontier of Japan until the Enkyu-Emishi War of 1070, which extended the frontier to the northern coast of Honshu. As with the rest of the region, the early history of Iwate District is uncertain. Although Shiwa Castle was constructed in 803 as a major army base in the region, it fell into ruins only ten years later. The area came to be ruled by the Abe clan until the Former Nine Years War (1051-1063), followed by the Kiyohara clan until the Gosannen War (1083-1089) and the Northern Fujiwara until 1189. During the Muromachi period, the area gradually came under the control of the Nanbu clan from Nukanobu District to the north.

Under the Tokugawa shogunate, Iwate county consisted of one town (Morioka) and 85 villages under the control of Morioka Domain.

=== Early Meiji period ===
Following the Meiji restoration, Iwate District came under Rikuchū Province and became part of Morioka Prefecture in 1871. Morioka Prefecture became Iwate Prefecture in 1872. In January 1879, Iwate District was divided into Kita-Iwate District with 47 villages, and Minimi-Iwate District with 38 villages.

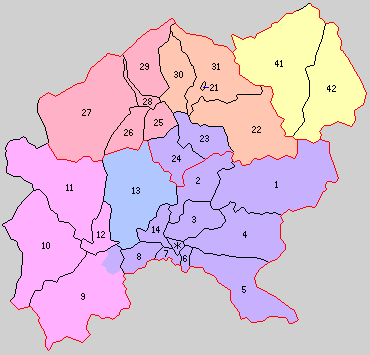
1889 Map of the original Iwate District: Purple=present-day Morioka City (*. Morioka City from 1889 1. Yabukawa; 2. Tamayama; 3. Yonai; 4. Asagishi; 5. Yanagawa; 6. Nakano; 7. Motomiya; 8. Ōta; 14. Kuriyagawa; 23. Makibori: 24. Shibutami) Blue=Takizawa City (then Takizawa Village) Pink=Shizukuishi Town (9. Gosho; 10. Gomyōjin; 11. Nishiyama; 12. Shizukuishi) Red=Hachimantai City (25. Ōbuke; 26. Dendō; 27. Matsuo; 28. Tairadate) Orange=Iwate Town (21. Numakunai; 22. Kawaguchi; 29. Terada; 30. Ikkatai; 31. Midō) Yellow=Kuzumaki Town (41. Kuzumaki; 42. Ekari)

=== Subsequent timeline ===
- April 1, 1897 – With the establishment of the municipality system, Kita-Iwate District and Minami-Iwate District were merged to become Iwate District, and was organized into one town (Morioka and 24 villages)
- December 23, 1940 - The village of Shizukuishi was elevated to town status. (2 towns, 21 villages)
- April 10, 1941 - The villages of Asagishi, Nakano and Motomiya were merged into the city of Morioka. (2 towns, 18 villages)
- July 1, 1948 - The town of Kuzumaki, and the village of Ekari were moved from Kunohe District to Iwate District. (3 towns, 19 villages)
- April 1, 2002 - The town of Ashiro was moved from Ninohe District to Iwate District. (5 towns, 3 villages)
- September 1, 2005 - The towns of Ashiro and Nishine, and the village of Matsuo were merged to create the city of Hachimantai. (3 towns, 2 villages)
- January 10, 2006 - The village of Tamayama was merged into the expanded city of Morioka. (3 towns, 1 village)
- January 1, 2014 - The village of Takizawa was elevated to city status. (3 towns)
