= Kuji, Iran =

Village in Gilan, Iran

Kuji كوجي
- Village
- Location within Iran
- Coordinates: 36°47′37″N 50°10′00″E
- Country: Iran
- Province: Gilan
- County: Rudsar
- Bakhsh: Rahimabad
- Rural District: Shuil

Population (2006)
  - Total: 15
- Time zone: UTC+3:30 (IRST)
  - Summer (DST): UTC+4:30 (IRDT)

Kuji (Persian: كوجي, also Romanized as Kūjī) is a village in Shuil Rural District, Rahimabad District, Rudsar County, Gilan Province, Iran. At the 2006 census, its population was 15, in 6 families.
