= Taneichi, Iwate =

Taneichi 種市町
- Former municipality
- Flag Emblem

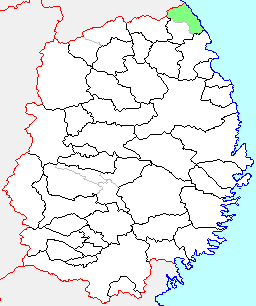
- Location of Taneichi in Iwate Prefecture

- Location in Japan
- Coordinates: 40°25′N 141°43′E
- Country: Japan
- Region: Tōhoku
- Prefecture: Iwate Prefecture
- District: Kunohe
- Merged: April 1, 2005 (now part of Hirono)

Area
  - Total: 168.55 km^{2} (65.08 sq mi)

Population (January 1, 2006)
  - Total: 13,449
  - Density: 79.79/km^{2} (206.7/sq mi)
- Time zone: UTC+09:00 (JST)
- Climate: Cfb
- Symbols
- Bird: Eurasian skylark
- Flower: Rosa rugosa
- Tree: Japanese red pine

Taneichi (種市町, Taneichi-machi) was a town located in Kunohe District, Iwate Prefecture, Japan.

== History ==
The village of Taneichi was created on April 1, 1889, within Kita-Kunohe District with the establishment of the municipality system. Kita-Kunohe District and Minami-Kunohe Districts merged to form Kunohe District on April 1, 1897. Taneichi was raised to town status on April 1, 1951, annexing the village of Nakano on February 11, 1955. On April 1, 2005, Taneichi merged with the town of Ōno (also from Kunohe District) to create the new town of Hirono.

== Population ==
As of January 2006, the town had an estimated population of 13,449 and a population density of 79.79 persons per km^{2}. The total area was 168.55 km^{2}.

== Geography ==
=== Climate ===
Climate data for Taneichi (1991−2020 normals, extremes 1976−present)
| Month | Jan | Feb | Mar | Apr | May | Jun | Jul | Aug | Sep | Oct | Nov | Dec | Year |
|---|---|---|---|---|---|---|---|---|---|---|---|---|---|
| Record high °C (°F) | 14.6 (58.3) | 19.9 (67.8) | 22.7 (72.9) | 30.7 (87.3) | 32.5 (90.5) | 32.4 (90.3) | 34.8 (94.6) | 35.4 (95.7) | 33.8 (92.8) | 27.5 (81.5) | 23.3 (73.9) | 19.6 (67.3) | 35.4 (95.7) |
| Mean daily maximum °C (°F) | 2.6 (36.7) | 3.3 (37.9) | 6.9 (44.4) | 12.8 (55.0) | 17.3 (63.1) | 19.5 (67.1) | 23.3 (73.9) | 25.1 (77.2) | 22.5 (72.5) | 17.4 (63.3) | 11.5 (52.7) | 5.2 (41.4) | 14.0 (57.1) |
| Daily mean °C (°F) | −0.9 (30.4) | −0.6 (30.9) | 2.4 (36.3) | 7.6 (45.7) | 12.2 (54.0) | 15.3 (59.5) | 19.5 (67.1) | 21.2 (70.2) | 18.3 (64.9) | 12.6 (54.7) | 6.7 (44.1) | 1.2 (34.2) | 9.6 (49.3) |
| Mean daily minimum °C (°F) | −4.2 (24.4) | −4.3 (24.3) | −1.8 (28.8) | 2.5 (36.5) | 7.5 (45.5) | 11.7 (53.1) | 16.4 (61.5) | 18.1 (64.6) | 14.6 (58.3) | 8.1 (46.6) | 2.3 (36.1) | −2.2 (28.0) | 5.7 (42.3) |
| Record low °C (°F) | −14.2 (6.4) | −12.7 (9.1) | −11.4 (11.5) | −7.4 (18.7) | −2.1 (28.2) | 1.1 (34.0) | 7.3 (45.1) | 8.0 (46.4) | 5.8 (42.4) | −0.9 (30.4) | −6.1 (21.0) | −11.4 (11.5) | −14.2 (6.4) |
| Average precipitation mm (inches) | 52.5 (2.07) | 51.5 (2.03) | 65.0 (2.56) | 74.4 (2.93) | 107.7 (4.24) | 130.4 (5.13) | 173.4 (6.83) | 176.3 (6.94) | 182.5 (7.19) | 129.7 (5.11) | 74.0 (2.91) | 59.2 (2.33) | 1,267 (49.88) |
| Average precipitation days (≥ 1.0 mm) | 8.0 | 8.1 | 9.2 | 9.2 | 10.7 | 10.9 | 13.2 | 13.0 | 11.4 | 9.6 | 9.0 | 7.7 | 120 |
| Mean monthly sunshine hours | 162.2 | 152.0 | 190.0 | 195.6 | 199.7 | 164.4 | 142.1 | 153.2 | 146.7 | 165.2 | 156.3 | 157.2 | 1,988.7 |
Source: JMA

== Education ==
The following table lists Taneichi's schools.

=== Elementary schools (municipal) ===
- Taneichi Elementary School - 種市小学校
- Hiranai Elementary School - 平内小学校
- Kadonohama Elementary School - 角浜小学校
- Jounai Elementary/Junior High School - 城内小中学校
- Yamato Elementary/Junior High School - 大和小中学校
- Shukunohe Elementary School - 宿戸小学校
- Nakano Elementary School - 中野小学校
- Okonai Elementary School - 小子内小学校

=== Middle / Junior High Schools (municipal) ===
- Taneichi Junior High - 種市中学校
- Kadonohama Junior High - 角浜中学校
- Jounai Elementary / Junior High School - 城内小中学校
- Yamato Elementary / Junior High School - 大和小中学校
- Shukunohe Junior High - 宿戸中学校
- Nakano Junior High - 中野中学校

=== High School (prefectural) ===
- Taneichi Senior High School - 種市高等学校
