= Ishinosuke Uwano =

Japanese military officer (1922–2013)

- 上野石之助
- Born: October 1922; Hirono, Iwate, Empire of Japan
- Died: 2013 (aged 90–91)
- Children: 3
- Military career
- Allegiance: Empire of Japan
- Branch: Imperial Japanese Army
- Conflicts: World War II; Soviet–Japanese War (POW)

Ishinosuke Uwano (上野 石之助, Uwano Ishinosuke; 1922 – 2013) was a Japanese soldier who later became a Soviet and Ukrainian citizen. An officer in the Imperial Japanese Army, he was captured as a Soviet prisoner of war. Declared dead in Japan in 2000, he attracted media attention in April 2006 after he was discovered alive in Ukraine, where he lived voluntarily after his release.

== Missing person case ==
Ishinosuke Uwano was born in Hirono, Iwate. Uwano was stationed in Karafuto Prefecture on Sakhalin at the end of World War II. He had been in contact with his family as late as 1958. The last time that Uwano's family saw him was in Sakhalin in 1958. After that, they lost all contact with him.

According to Japanese media, Uwano moved to the Ukrainian Soviet Socialist Republic in 1965. He subsequently married a Ukrainian woman and settled in Zhytomyr, where he had three children. However, his lack of contact with his family led to the declaration that he was legally dead in 2000.

Uwano contacted the Japanese embassy in Ukraine in 2006 and returned to Japan. As he had been declared legally dead, when he returned to Japan to visit family in 2006 he had to enter the country on a Ukrainian passport. Before 2006, the last time Uwano met his siblings was in 1943. He forgot how to speak Japanese and was only able to speak a few words of it. Uwano wanted to have his Japanese citizenship restored.

== Later life ==
Uwano died in 2013. His family evacuated from Ukraine to Japan as a result of the Russian invasion of Ukraine in 2022.

== See also ==
- List of solved missing person cases
