= Kuji River (Iwate) =

Kuji River 久慈川
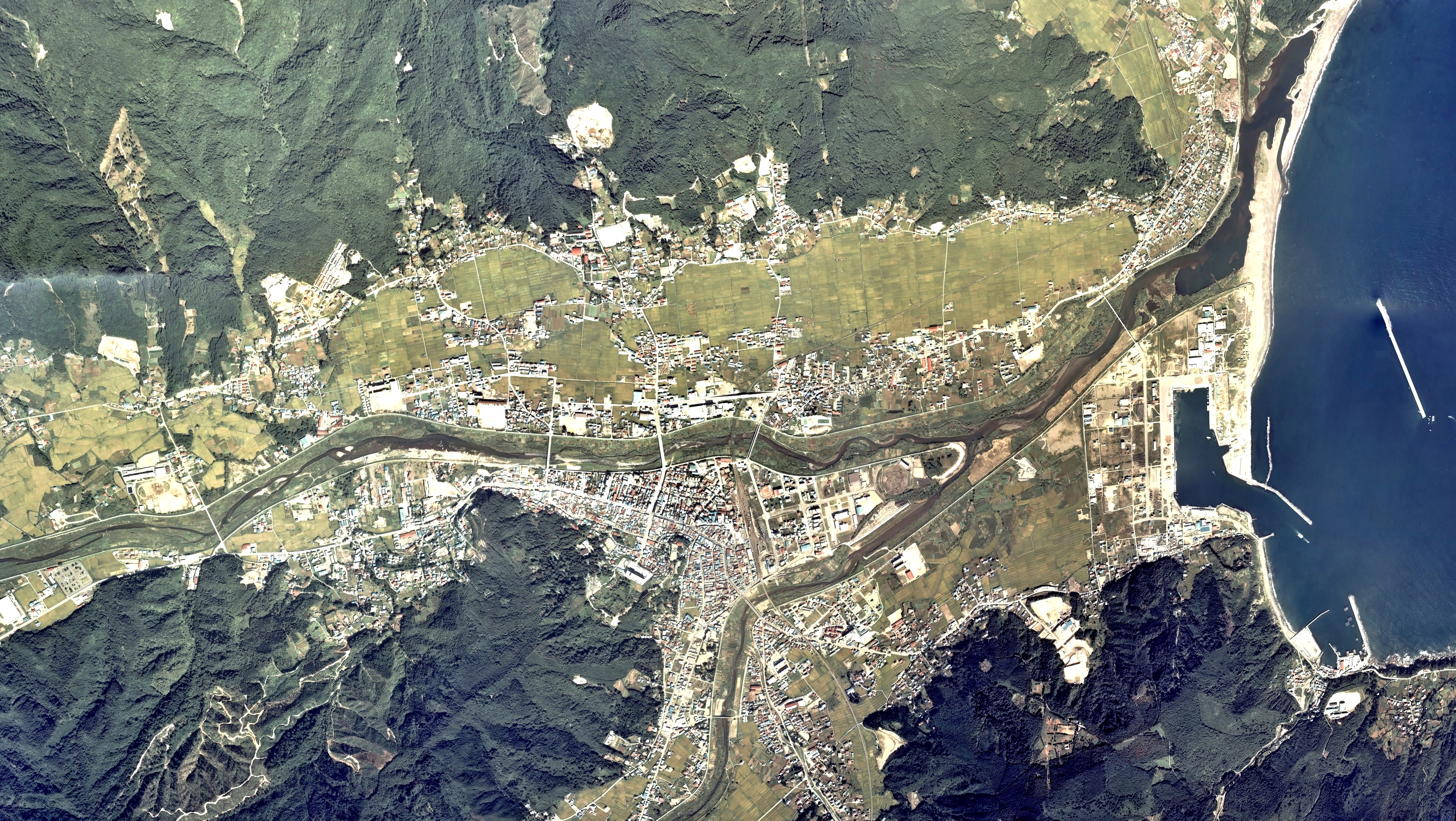
- Aerial photograph of Kuji River running through Kuji City (1977); Made based on National Land Image Information (Color Aerial Photographs), Ministry of Land, Infrastructure, Transport and Tourism

- Location within Japan

Location
- Country: Japan
- State: Honshu
- Region: Iwate

Physical characteristics
- Source: Myojindake (明神岳)
- Mouth: Kuji Bay, Pacific Ocean
  - coordinates: 40°12′05″N 141°47′57″E
- Length: 27.609 km (17.155 mi)

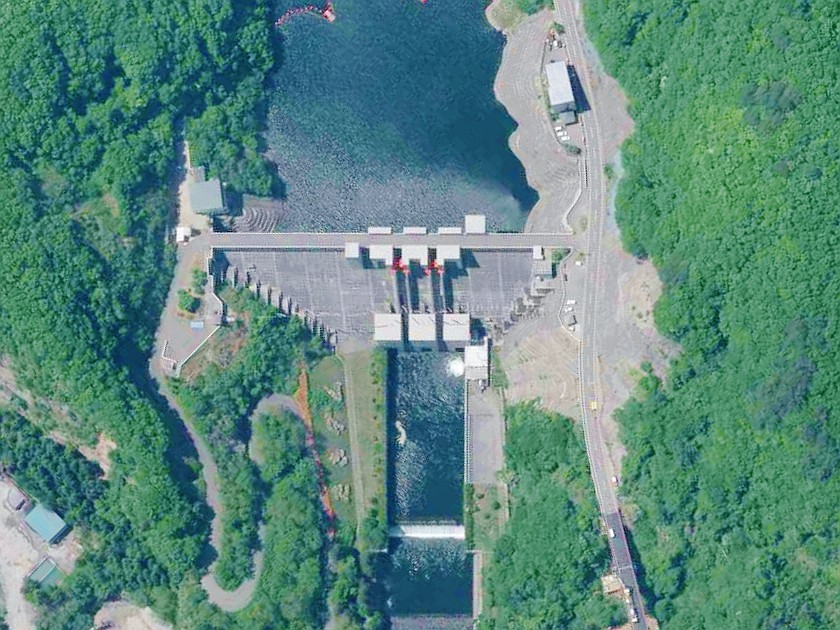
Taki Dam situated on Nagauchi River (2011) Made based on National Land Image Information (Color Aerial Photographs), Ministry of Land, Infrastructure, Transport and Tourism

The Kuji River (Japanese: 久慈川(くじがわ), Hepburn: kujigawa) is a river in Kuji, Iwate of Japan. It rises at Mount Myojindake located in Kitakami Mountains, and flows into the Pacific Ocean at Kuji City. It is 27.609 kilometers (17.155 mi) in length, and is designated as a Class B river. The urban area of Kuji City is situated on the alluvial plain of the river.

Kuji Valley (久慈渓流(くじけいりゅう)/久慈川渓谷(くじがわけいこく), kuji-keiryu/kujigawa-keikoku) is located along the upper reach of the river. It has a water spring named Furosen (不老泉, literally "ageless spring"), which is known for one of the valuable water springs in Iwate. Water from the spring was initially utilized for placer gold mining in Meiji Era. Later in the Taisho Era it was named after a legend, in which one had become immortal after drinking the water. The valley is a part of Kuji-Hiraniwa Prefectural Natural Park.

Kuji Region used to contain characteristic Tatara furnaces, in which a water wheel was utilized to supply the air to the furnace, while in many other regions of the country man-power was utilized. Today some parts of the furnaces remain along a tributary river of Kuji River.

The tributaries consist of Natsui River (夏井川), Nagauchi River (長内川), Sawa River (沢川), Tazawa River (田沢川), Tagonai River (田子内川), Heromachi River (戸呂町川), Hinosawa River (日野沢川), Enbetsu River (遠別川) and Futamata River (二又川).

Taki Dam (滝ダム) is a concrete gravity dam situated on Nagauchi River, which is one of the tributaries. It has the total capacity of 7,600,000 m^{3} (9,900,000 yd^{3}) and the height of 70 m (230 ft). Construction of the dam started in 1969 and was completed in 1982.

== See also ==
- Sanriku Geopark
