= Kuji, Iwate =

Kuji 久慈市
- City
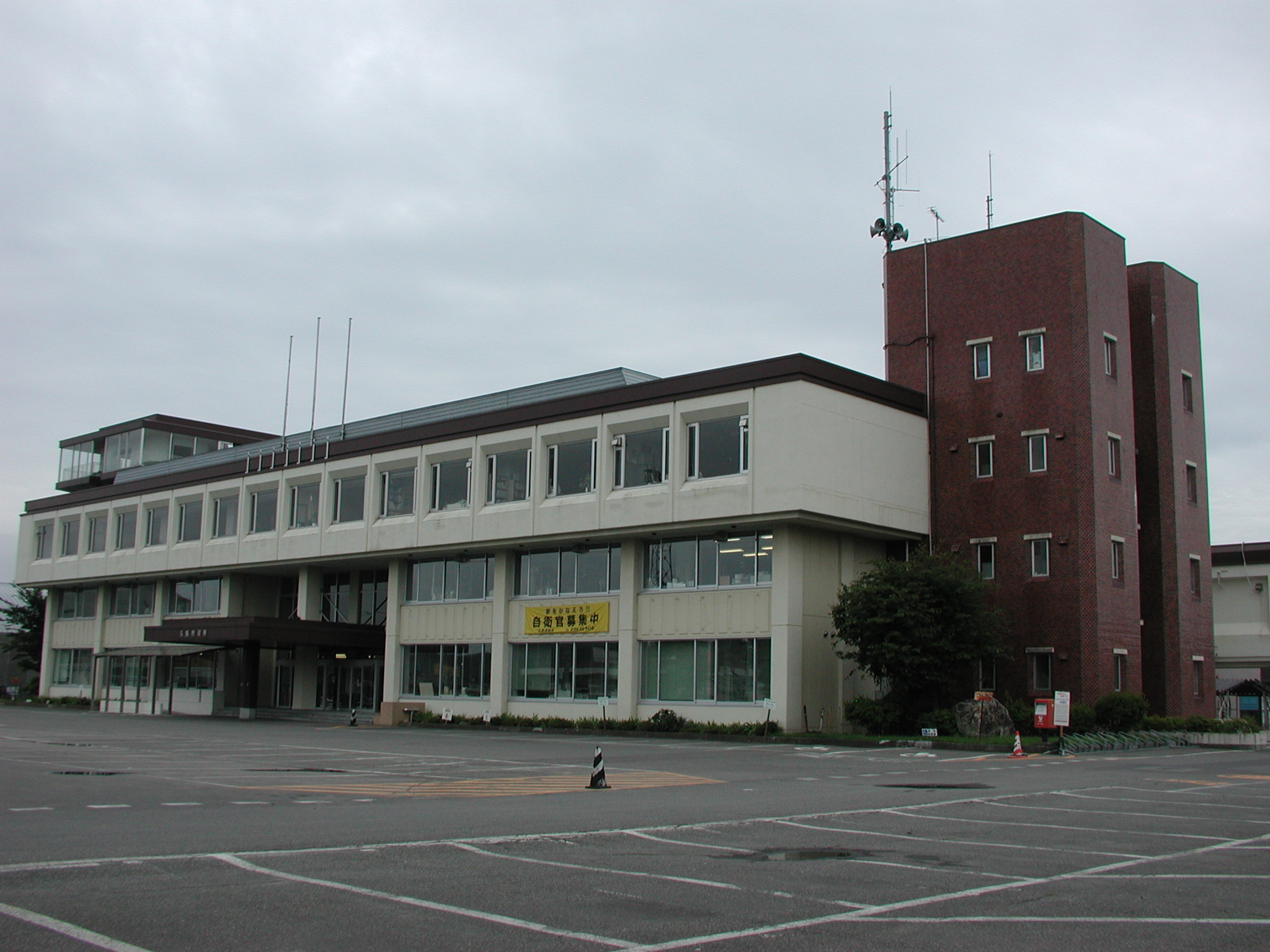
- Kuji City Hall

- Flag Seal

- Location of Kuji in Iwate Prefecture

- Coordinates: 40°11′25.7″N 141°46′32.4″E
- Country: Japan
- Region: Tōhoku
- Prefecture: Iwate

Government
  - Mayor: Hitoshi Nakatai (中平均) - from March 2026

Area
  - Total: 623.50 km^{2} (240.73 sq mi)

Population (March 31, 2020)
  - Total: 34,418
  - Density: 55.201/km^{2} (142.97/sq mi)
- Time zone: UTC+9 (Japan Standard Time)
- Phone number: 0194-52-2111
- Address: 1-1 Kawasakichō, Kuji-shi, Iwate-ken 028-8030
- Climate: Cfa/Cfb
- Website: Official website
- Symbols
- Bird: Japanese bush warbler
- Flower: Azalea
- Tree: Ginkgo biloba

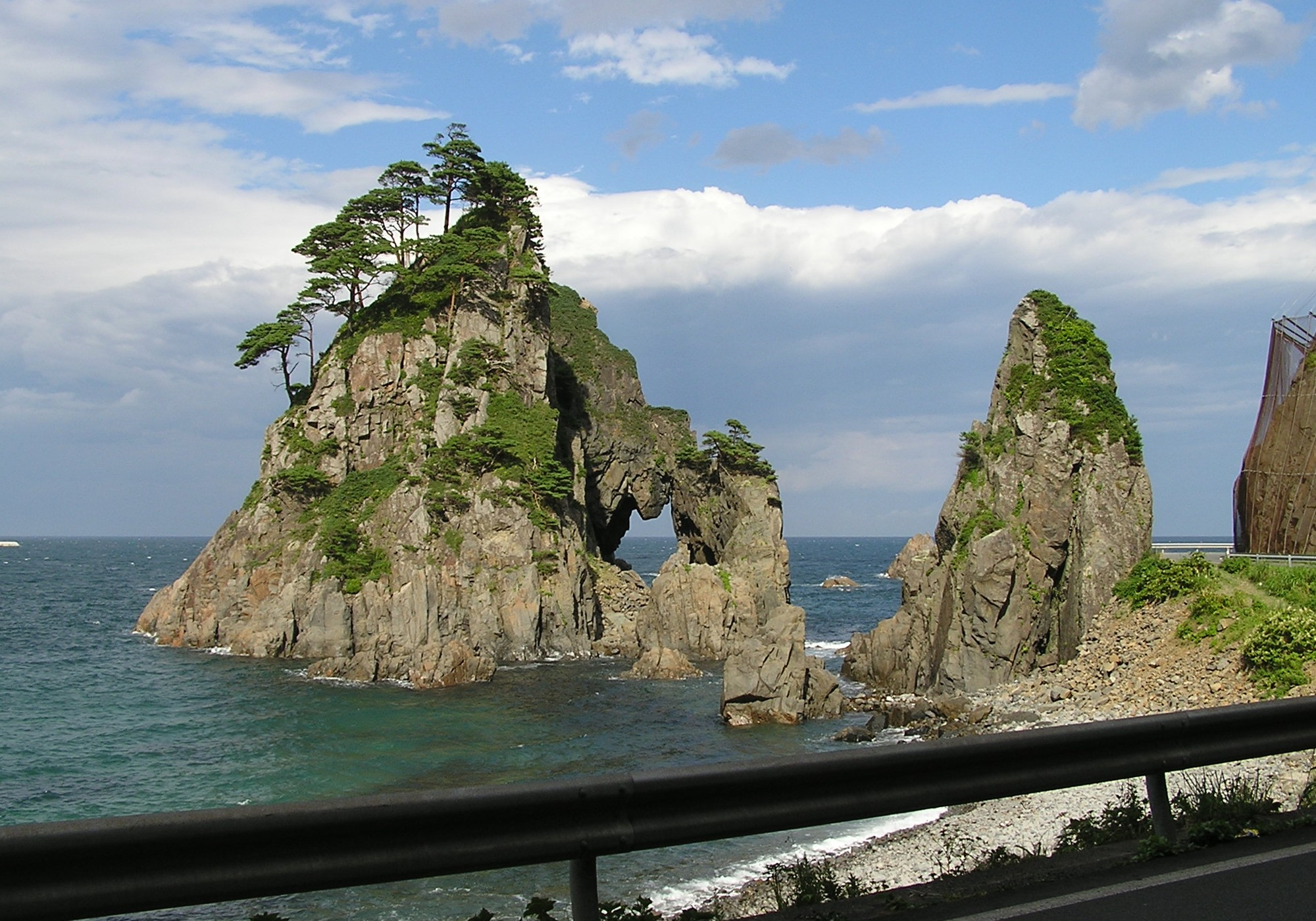
Sanriku coastline at Kuji

Kuji (久慈市, Kuji-shi) is a city in Iwate Prefecture, Japan. As of 3 March 2020, the city had an estimated population of 34,418 in 15,675 households, and a population density of 55 persons per km^{2}. The total area of the city is 623.50 square kilometres (240.73 sq mi).

== Geography ==
Kuji is in far northeastern Iwate Prefecture, bordered by the Pacific Ocean to the east. Most of the inland areas of the city are within the Kitakami Mountains. Portions of the coastline of Kuji are within the borders of the Sanriku Fukkō National Park.

=== Neighboring municipalities ===
Iwate Prefecture

- Hirono
- Iwaizumi
- Karumai
- Kunohe
- Kuzumaki
- Noda

== Climate ==
Kuji has a humid subtropical climate (Köppen climate classification Cfa), characterized by mild summers and cool winters. The average annual temperature in Kuji is 9.7 °C. The average annual rainfall is 1176 mm with September as the wettest month and February as the driest month. The temperatures are highest on average in August, at around 22.5 °C, and lowest in January, at around -1.9 °C.

Climate data for Kuji (elevation 13 m, 1991–2020 normals, extremes 1976–present)
| Month | Jan | Feb | Mar | Apr | May | Jun | Jul | Aug | Sep | Oct | Nov | Dec | Year |
|---|---|---|---|---|---|---|---|---|---|---|---|---|---|
| Record high °C (°F) | 16.2 (61.2) | 22.0 (71.6) | 23.3 (73.9) | 32.1 (89.8) | 33.0 (91.4) | 33.9 (93.0) | 35.4 (95.7) | 36.4 (97.5) | 34.8 (94.6) | 29.3 (84.7) | 26.0 (78.8) | 21.5 (70.7) | 36.4 (97.5) |
| Mean daily maximum °C (°F) | 3.8 (38.8) | 4.4 (39.9) | 8.2 (46.8) | 13.8 (56.8) | 18.4 (65.1) | 20.5 (68.9) | 24.1 (75.4) | 26.1 (79.0) | 23.6 (74.5) | 18.5 (65.3) | 12.8 (55.0) | 6.4 (43.5) | 15.0 (59.0) |
| Daily mean °C (°F) | −0.5 (31.1) | −0.2 (31.6) | 3.0 (37.4) | 8.1 (46.6) | 12.8 (55.0) | 16.1 (61.0) | 20.1 (68.2) | 21.9 (71.4) | 18.8 (65.8) | 12.8 (55.0) | 6.8 (44.2) | 1.7 (35.1) | 10.1 (50.2) |
| Mean daily minimum °C (°F) | −4.7 (23.5) | −4.9 (23.2) | −2.0 (28.4) | 2.4 (36.3) | 7.7 (45.9) | 12.3 (54.1) | 16.9 (62.4) | 18.5 (65.3) | 14.5 (58.1) | 7.4 (45.3) | 1.4 (34.5) | −2.7 (27.1) | 5.5 (41.9) |
| Record low °C (°F) | −16.5 (2.3) | −17.7 (0.1) | −13.3 (8.1) | −7.1 (19.2) | −2.3 (27.9) | 1.1 (34.0) | 7.0 (44.6) | 7.4 (45.3) | 3.9 (39.0) | −2.6 (27.3) | −7.0 (19.4) | −12.3 (9.9) | −17.7 (0.1) |
| Average precipitation mm (inches) | 50.9 (2.00) | 49.7 (1.96) | 68.9 (2.71) | 70.9 (2.79) | 89.6 (3.53) | 121.4 (4.78) | 161.9 (6.37) | 177.9 (7.00) | 183.7 (7.23) | 135.1 (5.32) | 54.9 (2.16) | 53.9 (2.12) | 1,207.9 (47.56) |
| Average snowfall cm (inches) | 50 (20) | 61 (24) | 35 (14) | 2 (0.8) | 0 (0) | 0 (0) | 0 (0) | 0 (0) | 0 (0) | 0 (0) | 0 (0) | 22 (8.7) | 169 (67) |
| Average precipitation days (≥ 1.0 mm) | 5.3 | 5.9 | 7.4 | 8.2 | 9.7 | 9.9 | 13.3 | 12.5 | 11.4 | 8.4 | 6.6 | 5.4 | 103.9 |
| Mean monthly sunshine hours | 163.2 | 151.4 | 185.0 | 190.3 | 195.4 | 159.9 | 137.4 | 149.8 | 141.9 | 154.0 | 150.0 | 151.0 | 1,936.9 |
Source: Japan Meteorological Agency

Climate data for Yamagata, Kuji (elevation 290 m, 1991–2020 normals, extremes 1977–present)
| Month | Jan | Feb | Mar | Apr | May | Jun | Jul | Aug | Sep | Oct | Nov | Dec | Year |
|---|---|---|---|---|---|---|---|---|---|---|---|---|---|
| Record high °C (°F) | 13.3 (55.9) | 17.3 (63.1) | 22.1 (71.8) | 28.9 (84.0) | 34.1 (93.4) | 33.7 (92.7) | 35.6 (96.1) | 36.4 (97.5) | 33.9 (93.0) | 28.7 (83.7) | 24.4 (75.9) | 20.4 (68.7) | 36.4 (97.5) |
| Mean daily maximum °C (°F) | 1.2 (34.2) | 2.1 (35.8) | 6.3 (43.3) | 13.3 (55.9) | 19.2 (66.6) | 21.9 (71.4) | 25.3 (77.5) | 26.4 (79.5) | 22.7 (72.9) | 17.1 (62.8) | 10.8 (51.4) | 4.0 (39.2) | 14.2 (57.6) |
| Daily mean °C (°F) | −2.7 (27.1) | −2.2 (28.0) | 1.3 (34.3) | 7.3 (45.1) | 12.9 (55.2) | 16.4 (61.5) | 20.3 (68.5) | 21.3 (70.3) | 17.3 (63.1) | 10.9 (51.6) | 5.2 (41.4) | −0.2 (31.6) | 9.0 (48.2) |
| Mean daily minimum °C (°F) | −7.2 (19.0) | −7.0 (19.4) | −3.9 (25.0) | 1.1 (34.0) | 6.4 (43.5) | 11.1 (52.0) | 16.2 (61.2) | 17.1 (62.8) | 12.6 (54.7) | 5.3 (41.5) | −0.2 (31.6) | −4.5 (23.9) | 3.9 (39.0) |
| Record low °C (°F) | −17.8 (0.0) | −21.7 (−7.1) | −18.1 (−0.6) | −11.6 (11.1) | −3.7 (25.3) | −1.0 (30.2) | 4.9 (40.8) | 4.4 (39.9) | 0.8 (33.4) | −4.9 (23.2) | −10.0 (14.0) | −15.0 (5.0) | −21.7 (−7.1) |
| Average precipitation mm (inches) | 52.5 (2.07) | 47.5 (1.87) | 66.2 (2.61) | 64.5 (2.54) | 79.1 (3.11) | 92.0 (3.62) | 164.5 (6.48) | 172.0 (6.77) | 160.9 (6.33) | 125.0 (4.92) | 58.7 (2.31) | 62.2 (2.45) | 1,133 (44.61) |
| Average precipitation days (≥ 1.0 mm) | 10.7 | 10.6 | 11.8 | 10.5 | 10.8 | 10.7 | 14.2 | 12.9 | 12.3 | 11.0 | 10.4 | 11.1 | 137.1 |
| Mean monthly sunshine hours | 111.9 | 121.3 | 167.7 | 191.1 | 207.1 | 171.8 | 138.2 | 157.6 | 140.1 | 153.8 | 131.4 | 109.9 | 1,801.9 |
Source: Japan Meteorological Agency

== Demographics ==
Per Japanese census data, the population of Kuji peaked around the year 1960 and has declined by roughly one-third since then.

Historical population
| Year | Pop. | ±% |
|---|---|---|
| 1920 | 24,009 | — |
| 1930 | 27,611 | +15.0% |
| 1940 | 32,479 | +17.6% |
| 1950 | 40,429 | +24.5% |
| 1960 | 45,025 | +11.4% |
| 1970 | 43,044 | −4.4% |
| 1980 | 43,683 | +1.5% |
| 1990 | 42,758 | −2.1% |
| 2000 | 40,178 | −6.0% |
| 2010 | 36,875 | −8.2% |
| 2020 | 33,043 | −10.4% |

== History ==
The area of present-day Kuji was part of ancient Mutsu Province, and has been settled since at least the Jōmon period. Amber from the area has been found at archaeological sites dating from the Nara period at the site of Heijō-kyō and Fujiwara-kyō. The area came under the control of the central government only after 1070 AD in the mid-Heian period. From the Kamakura period, the area came under the control of the Nanbu clan, and during the Edo period, was part of Hachinohe Domain under the Tokugawa shogunate. The area was noted for its production of ironsand, essential in the production of Japanese swords. These deposits were exploited commercially from the Meiji period, but were exhausted by the 1960s.

In the early Meiji period, the town of Kuji was created within Kita-Kunohe District on April 1, 1889, with the establishment of the modern municipalities system. The area was devastated by a 26 metres (85 ft) tsunami in 1896, which killed 789 inhabitants. Kita-Kunohe District and Minami-Kunohe Districts merged to form Kunohe District on April 1, 1897. In January 1926, much of the town was destroyed by a fire which consumed 224 houses. An even larger fire in April 1945 destroyed 950 houses. The modern city was founded on November 3, 1954, with the merger of the towns of Kuji and Osanai with the villages of Samuraihama, Yamane, Natsui, Ube, and Okawame. In April 1983, a fire destroyed 61 homes in the city.

On March 6, 2006, the village of Yamagata (from Kunohe District), was merged into Kuji.

Kuji suffered extensive damage from the 2011 earthquake and tsunami, with the tsunami reaching 27 metres (89 ft) in some locations, and the tsunami damage extending 4 kilometres (2.5 mi) inland. A total of 444 houses were destroyed, and 410 houses extensively damaged, but there were only four confirmed fatalities, with two residents missing.

== Government ==
Kuji has a mayor-council form of government with a directly elected mayor and a unicameral city legislature of 24 members. Kuji, together with the neighboring village of Noda, contributes two seats to the Iwate Prefectural legislature. In terms of national politics, the city is part of Iwate 2nd district of the lower house of the Diet of Japan.

== Economy ==
The local economy is based on agriculture (primarily spinach) and commercial fishing. The Japan Underground Oil Storage Company operates a 1.67 million kiloliter underground petroleum storage facility in Kuji.

== Education ==
Kuji has 15 public elementary schools and ten public middle schools operated by the city government. The Iwate Prefectural Board of Education operates three public high schools, as well as one special education school. There is also one private high school.

== Transportation ==
=== Railway ===
East Japan Railway Company (JR East) - Hachinohe Line

- Samuraihama - Rikuchū-Natsui - Kuji

Sanriku Railway – Kita-Rias Line

- Rikuchū-Ube - Kuji

=== Highway ===
- Hachinohe-Kuji Expressway
- Sanriku-kita Jūkan Road
- National Route 45
- National Route 281
- National Route 395

=== Port ===
- Port of Kuji

== Local attractions ==
=== Ama divers ===
Kuji is known as the northern limit of the Ama, female divers. Ama dive without breathing aids to depths reaching 10 meters, procuring shellfish, seaweed, and pearls. The most acclaimed local catch is uni (sea urchin) and abalone.

=== Kokuji-yaki ===
Kokujiyaki (小久慈焼), also known as Kuji-yaki, is a style of ceramic pottery unique to the Kokuji district of Kuji with a 200-year history.

=== Kosode Coast ===
Kuji is on the northern reaches of the Sanriku Coastline, and Kosode Coast (小袖海岸) is a portion which is especially noted for its dramatic rock formations and views.

=== Kuji amber ===
Kuji is famous for its deposits of amber, which date from the Late Cretaceous Period. Kuji is the only place in Japan where amber has been found, and noted examples can be viewed at the Kuji Amber Museum.

== International relations ==
- (United States) Franklin, Indiana, USA, sister city since October 1960
- Klaipėda, Lithuania, sister city since 1991.

=== Ties with Franklin ===
In 1960 a sister city bond was established via Mayor Frank S. Records of Franklin, Indiana and Mayor Gyobun Yamauchi, Mayor of Kuji, Japan. A Franklin College graduate and childhood resident of Franklin, Miss Thomasine Allen had traveled to Japan to pursue Christian missionary work. After teaching in various locations in Japan for several years from 1915, she found her way to Kuji, Japan in 1938 and spent the rest of her life there (with the exception of repatriation during WWII), establishing Christian facilities including a kindergarten, hospital, church and college. Upon establishment of the sister city relationship, Thomasine Allen was voted by the City Council of Kuji to be an honorary citizen of the city.

=== Ties with Klaipėda ===
Partnership between Kuji and Klaipėda began in 1989, one year before the independence of Lithuania, hence becoming the first Lithuanian sister city in Japan. In January 1991, then-Mayor of Kuji, Yoshiaki Kuji, condemned the military actions of Soviet Union by sending a protest note to the General Secretary of the CPSU Mikhail Gorbachev. The 1995 World Municipalities Congress in The Hague recognised Klaipėda's and Kuji's cities cooperation as an example to follow. Congress expressed hope that this cooperation will inspire other Lithuania's and Japan's cities to expand their partnership.

== Noted people from Kuji ==
- Tochinohana Hitoshi, sumo wrestler
- Katsuhiko Kashiwazaki, judoka
- Kyuzo Mifune, judoka

== In popular media ==
- Kuji was the setting for the fictional town of "Kitasanriku" in the popular 2013 NHK morning TV drama Amachan.

== See also ==
- Kuji River (Iwate)
