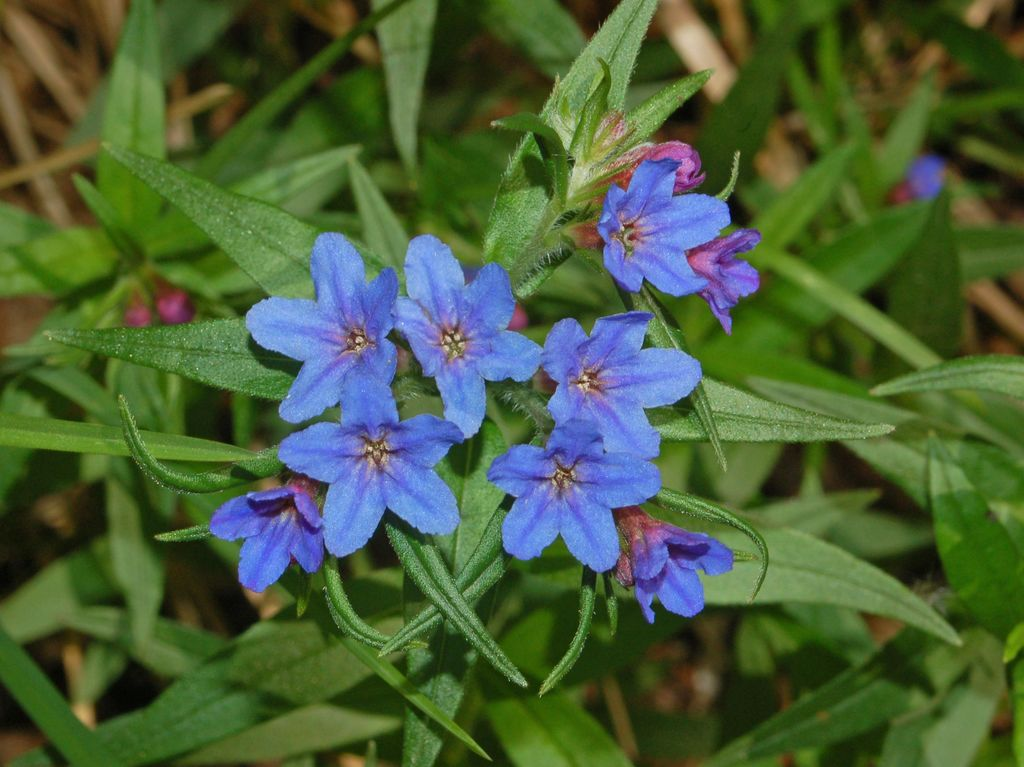

Scientific classification
- Kingdom: Plantae
- Clade: Tracheophytes
- Clade: Angiosperms
- Clade: Eudicots
- Clade: Asterids
- Order: Boraginales
- Family: Boraginaceae
- Genus: Aegonychon
- Species: A. purpurocaeruleum

Binomial name
- Aegonychon purpurocaeruleum L. Holub (1973)

Synonyms
- List: Aegonychon repens Gray (1821 publ. 1822); Buglossoides purpurocaeruleum (L.) I.M.Johnst. (1954); Lithospermum caeruleum Gueldenst. (1791); Lithospermum longiflorum Salisb. (1796); Lithospermum lucanum N.Terracc. (1907); Lithospermum pumilum Lehm. (1818); Lithospermum purpurascens Gueldenst. (1787); Lithospermum purpureum Gueldenst. (1787); Lithospermum purpurocaeruleum L. (1753); Lithospermum repens Stokes (1812); Lithospermum violaceum Lam. (1779); Margarospermum purpurocaeruleum (L.) Opiz (1839); Myosotis fruticosa Haenke (1786), nom. nud.; Rhytispermum purpurocaeruleum (L.) Link (1829)

= Aegonychon purpurocaeruleum =

Species of flowering plant in the borage family

Aegonychon purpurocaeruleum, commonly known as the purple gromwell, is a herbaceous perennial rhizomatous flowering plant and it belongs to the family Boraginaceae.

== Etymology ==
The Latin name of the species, purpurocaeruleum, means 'purple and blue', referring to the changing colour of the flowers with the progress of flowering.

== Description ==
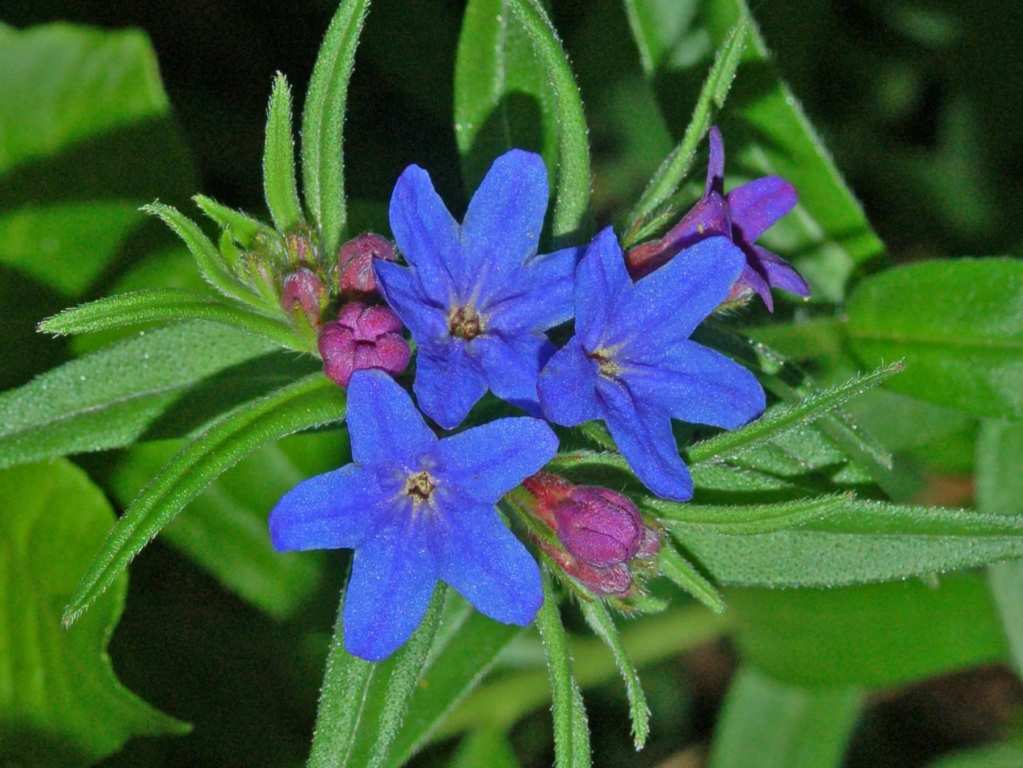
Close-up on purple-reddish blooms and blue flowers

Aegonychon purpurocaeruleum is a bushy plant that reaches on average 20–60 centimetres (7.9–23.6 in) of height, with a maximum of 70 centimetres (28 in). The stem is hairy, erect and unbranched. Leaves are dark green and lanceolate to narrow elliptic, with a prominent midrib on the underside. Flowers are hermaphroditic, funnel-shaped, 15–20 millimetres (0.59–0.79 in) long and 10–15 millimetres (0.39–0.59 in) of diameter, clustered in a racemose inflorescence. The flowers are initially purple-reddish, changing to a deep blue. The flowering period extends from April to June. The fruits are bright white capsules, 4–5 millimetres (0.16–0.20 in) long, with a glossy surface. They are very hard (hence the genus synonym Lithospermum, meaning "stone seed" for the hardness of these capsules).

== Distribution ==
This species is rare in British Isles, widespread in central Europe up to South Russia and in Mediterranean countries from Spain to eastern Turkey.

== Habitat ==
Aegonychon purpurocaeruleum is typically found in dry and warm forests characterized by sparse deciduous vegetation, it can also be found in the meadows situated on the edge of the woodlands, as well as in hedgerows and scrublands. The plants prefer calcareous soils rich in humus, at elevations of 0–1,800 metres (0–5,906 ft) above sea level.
