= Kuzumaki, Iwate =

Kuzumaki 葛巻町
- Town
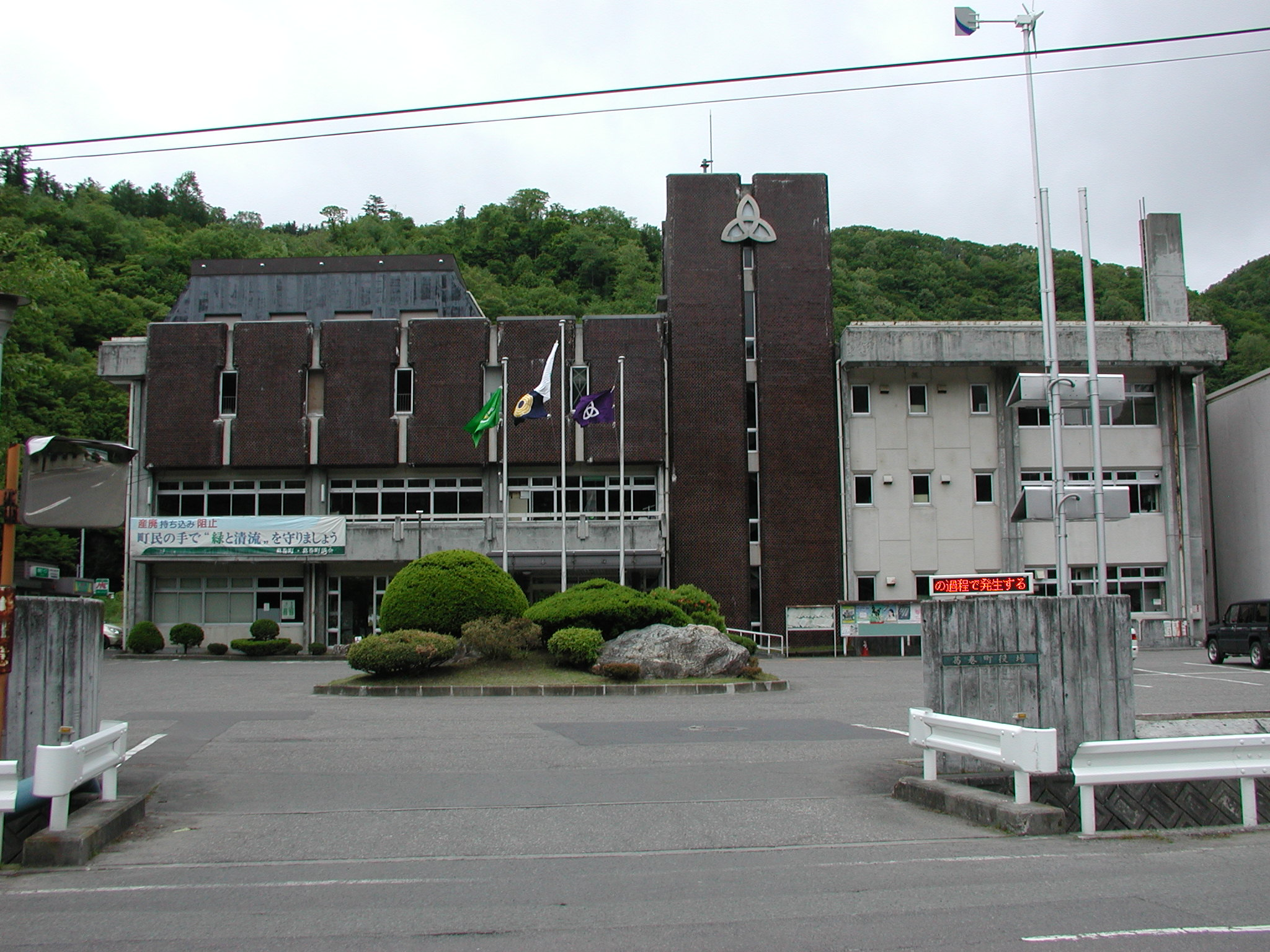
- Kuzumaki Town Hall

- Flag Seal

- Location of Kuzumaki in Iwate Prefecture

- Location within Japan
- Coordinates: 40°02′23.4″N 141°26′11.4″E
- Country: Japan
- Region: Tōhoku
- Prefecture: Iwate
- District: Iwate

Area
  - Total: 434.99 km^{2} (167.95 sq mi)

Population (January 1, 2020)
  - Total: 5,632
  - Density: 12.95/km^{2} (33.53/sq mi)
- Time zone: UTC+9 (Japan Standard Time)
- Phone number: 0195-66-2111
- Address: Kuzumaki dai-16 jiwari 1-1, Kuzumaki-machi, Iwate-gun, Iwate-ken 028-5494
- Climate: Dfb
- Website: Official website
- Symbols
- Bird: Copper pheasant
- Flower: Hagi
- Tree: Silver birch

Kuzumaki (葛巻町, Kuzumaki-machi) is a town located in Iwate Prefecture, Japan. As of 1 January 2020, the town had an estimated population of 5,632, and a population density of 13 persons per km^{2}. The total area of the town is 434.96 square kilometres (167.94 sq mi). The town uses many alternative energy sources, producing a surplus of energy, including wind power and biomass.

== Geography ==
Kuzumaki is located in a basin in north-central Iwate Prefecture with an average elevation of 400 meters, surrounded by the 1000 meter mountains of the Kitakami Mountains. Approximately 60% of the town area is mountains and forests. The Mabechi River flows through the town.

=== Neighboring municipalities ===
Iwate Prefecture

- Ichinohe
- Iwate
- Iwaizumi
- Kuji
- Kunohe
- Morioka

== Climate ==
Kuzumaki has a humid continental climate (Köppen climate classification Dfb) characterized by mild summers and cold winters. The average annual temperature in Kuzumaki is 8.5 °C (47.3 °F). The average annual rainfall is 1,037.9 mm (40.86 in) with September as the wettest month and February as the driest month. The temperatures are highest on average in August, at around 21.3 °C (70.3 °F), and lowest in January, at around −3.8 °C (25.2 °F).

Climate data for Kuzumaki (elevation 418 m, 1991–2020 normals, extremes 1976–present)
Month	Jan	Feb	Mar	Apr	May	Jun	Jul	Aug	Sep	Oct	Nov	Dec	Year
Record high °C (°F)	11.9 (53.4)	15.4 (59.7)	19.3 (66.7)	27.6 (81.7)	31.9 (89.4)	33.0 (91.4)	35.3 (95.5)	34.7 (94.5)	32.4 (90.3)	27.0 (80.6)	21.8 (71.2)	17.0 (62.6)	35.3 (95.5)
Mean daily maximum °C (°F)	0.0 (32.0)	1.0 (33.8)	5.3 (41.5)	12.7 (54.9)	19.1 (66.4)	22.6 (72.7)	25.7 (78.3)	26.7 (80.1)	22.4 (72.3)	16.2 (61.2)	9.5 (49.1)	2.8 (37.0)	13.7 (56.7)
Daily mean °C (°F)	−3.8 (25.2)	−3.2 (26.2)	0.5 (32.9)	6.8 (44.2)	12.8 (55.0)	16.7 (62.1)	20.6 (69.1)	21.3 (70.3)	17.0 (62.6)	10.4 (50.7)	4.4 (39.9)	−1.1 (30.0)	8.5 (47.3)
Mean daily minimum °C (°F)	−8.2 (17.2)	−8.0 (17.6)	−4.5 (23.9)	0.8 (33.4)	6.3 (43.3)	11.3 (52.3)	16.2 (61.2)	17.0 (62.6)	12.4 (54.3)	5.2 (41.4)	−0.5 (31.1)	−5.2 (22.6)	3.6 (38.5)
Record low °C (°F)	−22.6 (−8.7)	−23.2 (−9.8)	−20.3 (−4.5)	−11.8 (10.8)	−3.5 (25.7)	−0.4 (31.3)	5.6 (42.1)	5.0 (41.0)	0.2 (32.4)	−4.8 (23.4)	−10.7 (12.7)	−18.8 (−1.8)	−23.2 (−9.8)
Average precipitation mm (inches)	41.6 (1.64)	38.5 (1.52)	57.8 (2.28)	62.8 (2.47)	75.1 (2.96)	86.2 (3.39)	147.3 (5.80)	157.1 (6.19)	130.9 (5.15)	104.3 (4.11)	72.1 (2.84)	64.3 (2.53)	1,038 (40.88)
Average snowfall cm (inches)	116 (46)	107 (42)	76 (30)	7 (2.8)	0 (0)	0 (0)	0 (0)	0 (0)	0 (0)	0 (0)	4 (1.6)	79 (31)	384 (151)
Average precipitation days (≥ 1.0 mm)	10.4	9.8	11.4	11.2	10.3	9.8	11.8	11.8	11.4	10.9	12.1	11.8	132.8
Mean monthly sunshine hours	47.4	66.6	123.1	160.8	182.9	152.1	131.1	139.1	126.3	119.6	82.4	51.6	1,383
Source: Japan Meteorological Agency (1991–2020 normals, extremes 1976–present)

== Demographics ==
Per Japanese census data, the population of Kuzumaki has declined over the past 60 years. It is now about half of what it was a century ago and about a third of its peak around 1960.

Historical population
Year	Pop.	±%
1920	10,417	—
1930	11,209	+7.6%
1940	11,776	+5.1%
1950	14,142	+20.1%
1960	15,964	+12.9%
1970	14,135	−11.5%
1980	11,972	−15.3%
1990	10,364	−13.4%
2000	8,725	−15.8%
2010	7,307	−16.3%
2020	5,634	−22.9%

== History ==
The area of present-day Kuzumaki was part of ancient Mutsu Province. It was under the control of the Nambu clan from the Muromachi period, and was part of Hachinohe Domain under the Edo period Tokugawa shogunate. The area was noted for its horse ranches.

The villages of Kuzumaki and Ekari within Kita-Kunohe District and the village of Tabe within Iwate District were created on April 1, 1889, with the establishment of the modern municipality system. Kita-Kunohe District and Minami-Kunohe Districts merged to form Kunohe District on April 1, 1897. Kuzumaki was raised to town status on December 25, 1940. On July 1, 1948, Kuzumaki and Isashi were transferred to Iwate District. Kuzumaki annexed neighboring Ekari and Tabe on July 15, 1955.

== Government ==
Kuzumaki has a mayor-council form of government with a directly elected mayor and a unicameral town council of 10 members. Kuzumaki, together with the city of Hachimantai and the town of Iwate, contributes two seats to the Iwate Prefectural legislature. In terms of national politics, the town is part of Iwate 2nd district of the lower house of the Diet of Japan.

== Economy ==
The local economy is based on agriculture, including dairy products and wine production.

== Education ==
Kuzumaki has five public elementary schools and three public middle schools operated by the town government, and one public high school operated by the Iwate Prefectural Board of Education.

== Transportation ==
=== Railway ===
- Kuzumaki does not have any passenger railway services.

=== Highway ===
- National Route 281 – Kuzumaki-Kogen roadside station
- National Route 340
