= Kunohe District, Iwate =

Rural district in Iwate Prefecture, Japan

Coordinates: 40°18′00″N 141°33′36″E

- List of Provinces of Japan > Tōsandō > Rikuchū Province > Kunohe District
- Japan > Tōhoku region > Iwate Prefecture > Kunohe District

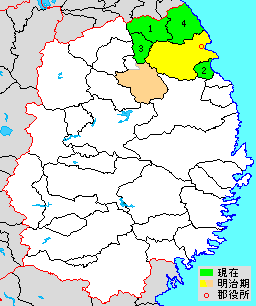
Map showing original extent of Kunohe District in Iwate Prefecture colored area=original extent in Meiji period; green=present area (1=Karumai; 2=Noda; 3=Kunohe; 4=Hirono)

Kunohe District (九戸郡, Kunohe-gun) is a rural district located in Iwate Prefecture, Japan.

As of June 1, 2019, the district has an estimated population of 33,315 with a density of 43.6 per km^{2} and an area of 763.56 km^{2}. The entire city of Kuji, and most of the town of Kuzumaki were formerly part of Kunohe District.

== Towns and villages ==
The district has two towns and two villages:

- Hirono
- Karumai
- Kunohe
- Noda

== History ==
The ancient county of Nukanobu (糠部郡, Nikanobu-gun) in Mutsu Province was divided into the counties of Ninohe, Sannohe, Kunohe and Kita in 1634. Under the Tokugawa shogunate, Kunohe county consisted of 47 villages under the control of Hachinohe Domain, 10 villages under the control of Morioka Domain and one village under joint control. Following the Meiji restoration Kunohe came under the new province of Rikuchu Province, which became part of Iwate Prefecture in 1872. With the establishment of the district system in 1878, the area was divided into Kita-Kunohe District (32 villages) and Minami-Kunohe District (27 villages).

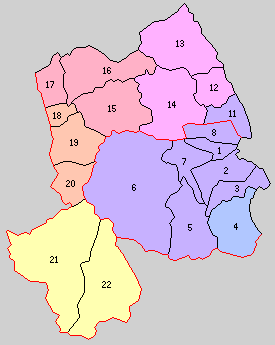
Historic Map of Kunohe District: Purple= Kuji City: 1. Kuji; 2. Osanai; 3. Ube; 5. Yamane; 6. Yamagata; 7. Okawame; 8. Natsui; 11. Samuraihama; Blue=Noda Village: 4. Noda; Pink=Hirono Town: 12. Nakano; 13. Taneichi; 14. Ono; Salmon=Karumai Town: 15. Kogarumai; 16. Karumai; 17. Hareyama; Pink=Kunohe Village: 18. Isashika; 19. Ibonai; 20. Toda; Yellow=Kuzumaki Town: 21. Kuzumaki; 22. Ekari

With the establishment of the municipality system on April 1, 1889, the two districts were merged and reorganized into one town (Kuji) and 19 villages. Karumai was raised to town status on January 1, 1925, followed by Kuzumaki on December 25, 1940. However, Kuzumaki was transferred to Iwate District in 1948. The town of Taneichi was created on April 1, 1951, followed by Osanai on June 1, 1952. Kuji was elevated to city status on November 3, 1954.

- January 1, 2006 - The town of Taneichi and the village of Ōno (spelled "Ohno" by the town.) merged to form the new town of Hirono.
- March 6, 2006 - The village of Yamagata merged with the city of Kuji.
