= Murone Kōgen Prefectural Natural Park =

Natural park of Iwate prefecture, Japan

- 室根高原県立自然公園
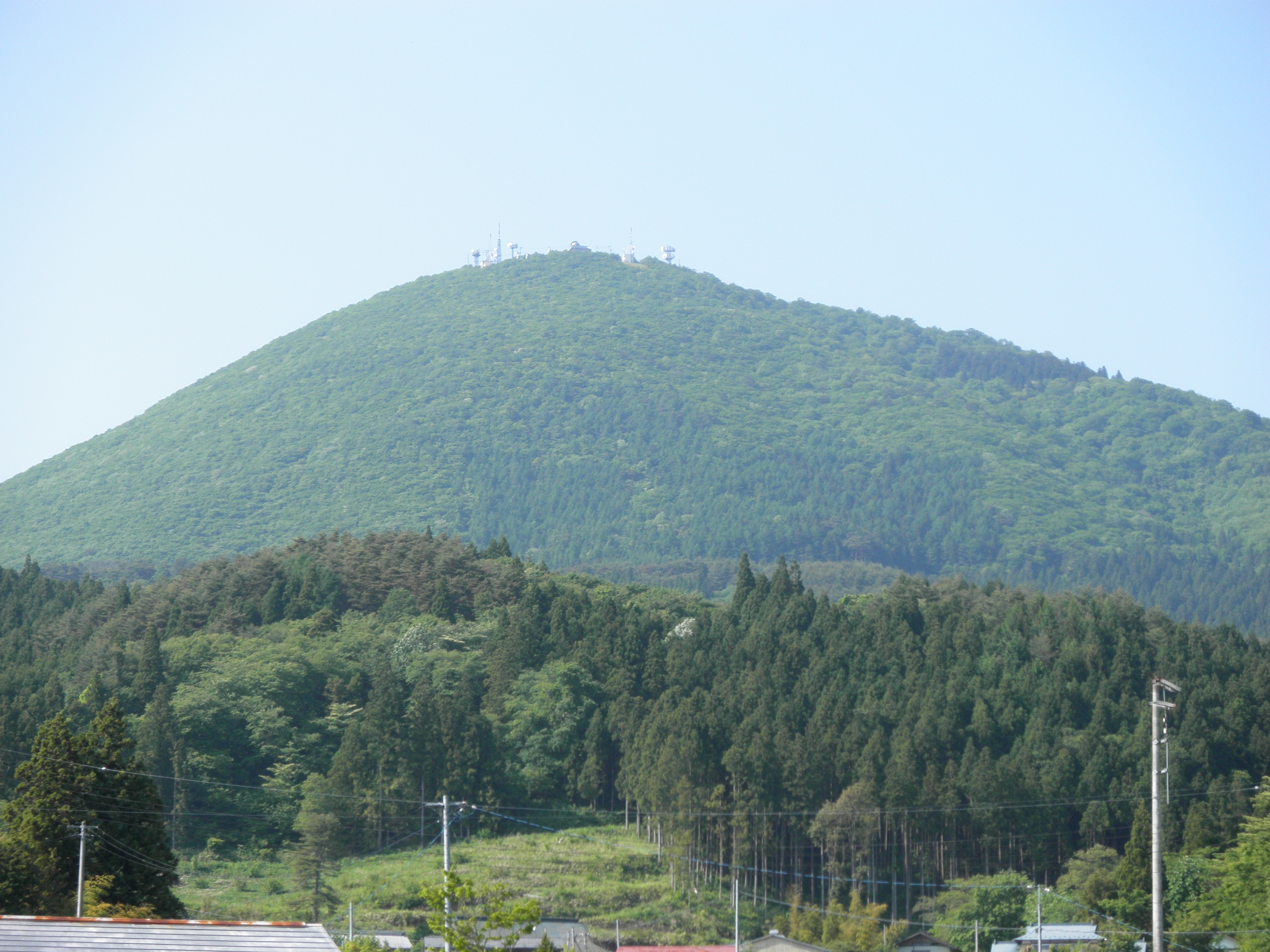
- Mount Murone
- Interactive map of Murone Kōgen Prefectural Natural Park
- Location: Iwate Prefecture, Japan
- Coordinates: 38°58′21″N 141°26′55″E
- Area: 14.95 km^{2} (5.77 sq mi)
- Established: 4 June 1974

Murone Kōgen Prefectural Natural Park (室根高原県立自然公園, Murone Kōgen kenritsu shizen kōen) is a Prefectural Natural Park in Iwate Prefecture, Japan. Established in 1974, the park spans the municipalities of Ichinoseki and Rikuzentakata.

== See also ==
- National Parks of Japan
