= Sotoyama-Hayasaka Prefectural Natural Park =

Natural park of Iwate prefecture, Japan

Sotoyama-Hayasaka Heights Prefectural Natural Park
- 外山早坂高原県立自然公園
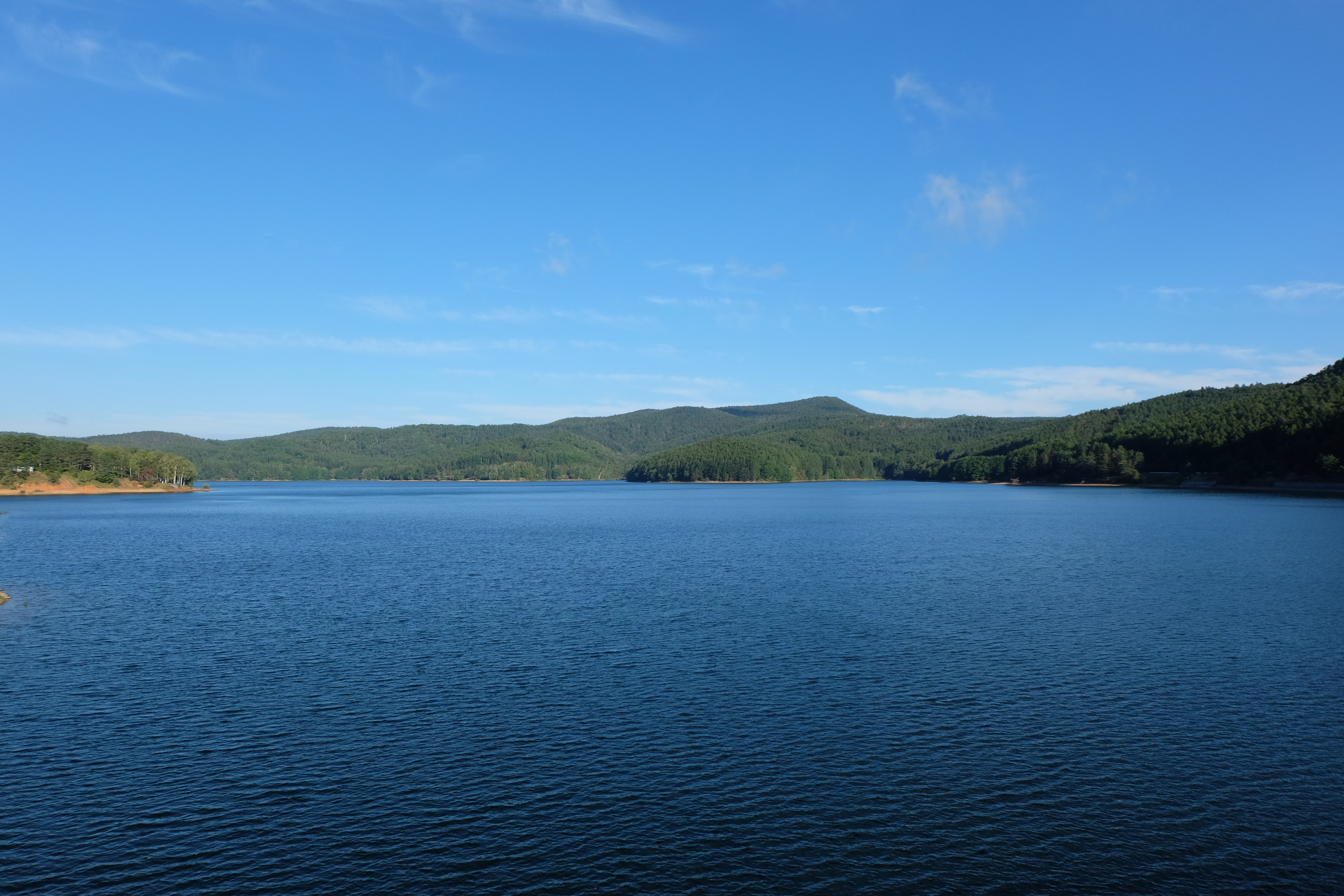
- Lake Gandō
- Interactive map of Sotoyama-Hayasaka Heights Prefectural Natural Park
- Location: Iwate Prefecture, Japan
- Coordinates: 39°49′06″N 141°22′42″E
- Area: 93.33 km^{2} (36.03 sq mi)
- Established: 8 May 1961

Sotoyama-Hayasaka Heights Prefectural Natural Park (外山早坂高原県立自然公園, Sotoyama-Hayasaka Kōgen kenritsu shizen kōen) is a Prefectural Natural Park in Iwate Prefecture, Japan. Established in 1961, the park spans the municipalities of Morioka and Iwaizumi.

== See also ==
- National Parks of Japan
