= List of people from Iwate =

The following are prominent people who were born, raised, have lived for a significant period in Iwate Prefecture or have otherwise had a significant impact.

== Native Emishi and opponents ==
- Aterui (? - 802) Isawa Emishi leader who was executed in 802.
- Sakanoue no Tamuramaro (758-811) Governor of Michinoku and Seii Tai Shōgun.

== Abe family and opponents ==
- Abe no Yoritoki (died 1057) chief of the six semi-autonomous Ezo districts and Martial of Frontier Defense.
- Abe no Sadato (1019-1062) chief of the six semi-autonomous Ezo districts.
- Minamoto no Yoriyoshi (988-1075) Governor of Mutsu.
- Minamoto no Yoshiie (1041-1108) son of Yoriyoshi, called Hachiman Taro.

== Fujiwara family and opponents ==
- Fujiwara no Kiyohira (1056-1128) Founder of the Oshu Fujiwara dynasty and builder of Chūson-ji.
- Fujiwara no Tsunekiyo (?-1062) Father of Fujiwara no Kiyohira.
- Fujiwara no Hidehira (1122?-1187) Third head of the Oshu Fujiwaras and governor of Mutsu.
- Minamoto no Yoshitsune (1159-1189) General of the Minamoto clan.
- Minamoto no Yoritomo (1147-1199) First Shōgun.

== Buddhist leaders ==
- Gyoki Founder of Shoboji in Oshu City.
- Jakucho Setouchi (1922- ) Head priest at Tendai-ji, author and speaker.

== Captains of science and industry ==
- Takano Chōei (1804–50) Dutch scholar, physician, writer, translator and dissident.
- Takatō Ōshima (1826-1901) made the first Western-style blast furnace and cannons in Hashino town, Kamaishi city, Japan.

== Military leaders ==
- Ichinohe Hyoe (1855-1931) Army General.
- Seishirō Itagaki (1885-1948) Army General and Class A War criminal.
- Shigeru Iwasaki (1953–Present) Chief of Staff of the Joint Staff Council, Japan Self-Defense Forces

== Political leaders ==
- Hara Takashi (1856-1921) Prime Minister.
- Gotō Shinpei (1857-1929) Mayor of Tokyo, Founder of Boy Scouts in Japan, Home Minister and Foreign Minister.
- Saitō Makoto (1858-1936) Admiral, Governor of Korea and Prime Minister.
- Nitobe Inazō (1862-1933) diplomat, author of Bushido: The Soul of Japan and Christian.
- Mitsumasa Yonai (1880-1948) Minister of Navy and Prime Minister.
- Zenko Suzuki (1911-2004) Prime Minister.
- Ichirō Ozawa (1942-) leader of Democratic Party of Japan.

== Singer ==
- Kohei Fukuda (1976 - )- Japanese folk singer.

== Writers ==
- Kunio Yanagita (1875-1962) scholar and author of Tōno Monogatari.
- Takuboku Ishikawa (1886-1912) publisher and poet.
- Kenji Miyazawa (1896-1932) teacher, poet and writer of fairy tales.
- Harumi Setouchi (1921- ) winner of Tanizaki Prize and Noma Prize.
- Kanichi Fujiwara (1961-) long distance motorcyclist, photographer, author and blogger
