= Bank of Iwate Red Brick Building =

- 岩手銀行赤レンガ館
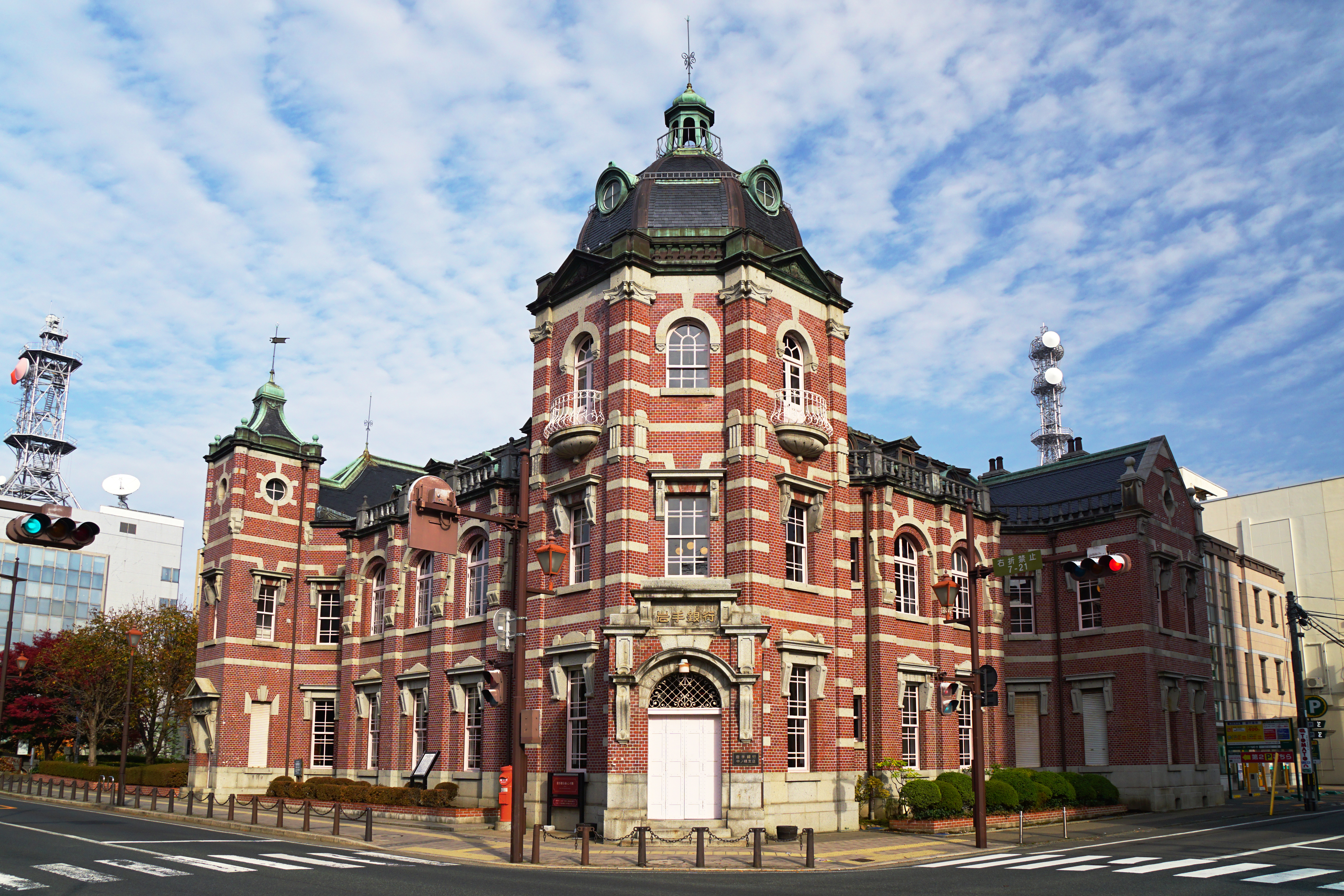
- Bank of Iwate Red Brick Building

- Location within Iwate Prefecture Location within Japan
- Former names: Bank of Morioka

General information
- Type: Bank
- Location: 2-20, Nakanohashi-dori 1-Chome, Morioka, Iwate Prefecture, Japan
- Coordinates: 39°42′2.2″N 141°9′18.6″E
- Construction started: 1906
- Completed: 1911
- Renovated: 2012
- Owner: Bank of Iwate

Technical details
- Material: red brick
- Floor count: 2
- Floor area: 693 m^{2} (7,460 sq ft)

Design and construction
- Architect: Tatsuno Kingo

Bank of Iwate Red Brick Building (岩手銀行赤レンガ館, Iwate Ginkō Aka-Renga kan) is a former bank building located in the city of Morioka, Iwate Prefecture, Japan. The building is an example of Meiji period western style architecture in Japan, and is listed as an Important Cultural Property. The building is now used as a museum.

== Overview ==
The building was initially constructed as the head office of the Morioka Bank, and is located at the foot of Nakanobashi Bridge, which crosses the Nakatsu River in Morioka. Work began in May 1908 and was completed in April 1911. The Morioka Bank went out of business in 1933, and the building was acquired by the Iwate Shokusan Bank in 1936, and became its head office. The bank's name was changed to the Bank of Iwate in 1960. It continued to be used as the bank's head office until a modern building was completed in 1983. It continued to be used as a brand office of the bank even after the building's designation as an Important Cultural Property, until 2012. The interior of the building was repaired and restored to its Meiji period appearance, and the building was opened to the public in 2016.

The main architect of the building was Tatsuno Kingo, who also designed the head office of the Bank of Japan in Tokyo. This is the only one of his works in the Tohoku region of Japan. Tatsuno was assisted by Morioka-native Kasai Manji. The unique characteristics of the building is that it has an octagonal domed tower in the southeast corner, a square tower in the southwest corner, and Japanese-style irimoya-zukuri gable roofs protruding from the sides. The outer wall is made of red brick and with stripes of white granite. Inside, there is a corridor on the second floor surrounding the colonnade on the first floor. About 910,000 bricks from Iwate prefecture are used for building materials, and Aomori Hiba cypress wood is used for the interior. Although the building is distinguished by its use of red bricks, it was painted white from 1936 until 1958 and was called the "White Meijikan".

== Current status ==
Currently, the interior is divided into a free "Iwate Bank Zone" and a paid "Morioka Bank Zone". The Iwate Bank Zone has a multi-purpose hall with refurbished business rooms and a library lounge that introduces the history of industry and commerce in Morioka. In the Morioka Bank Zone is a reception room and a safe room that has been used since the bank's opening. There is also a corner that introduces the financial history of Iwate Prefecture, and a theater that introduces the history and structure of the buildings.
