= Aterui =

Indigenous Japanese chief (died 802)

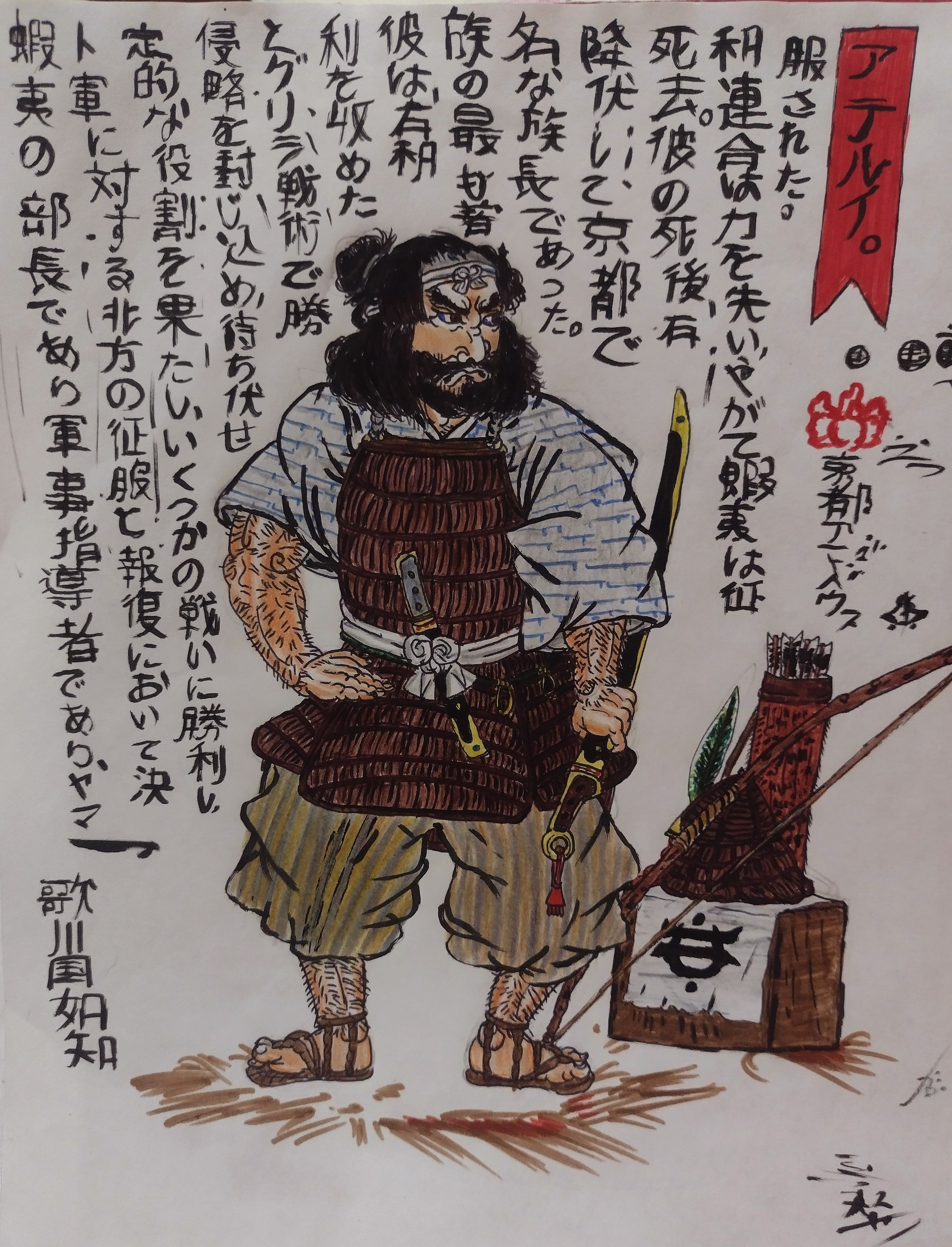
Aterui

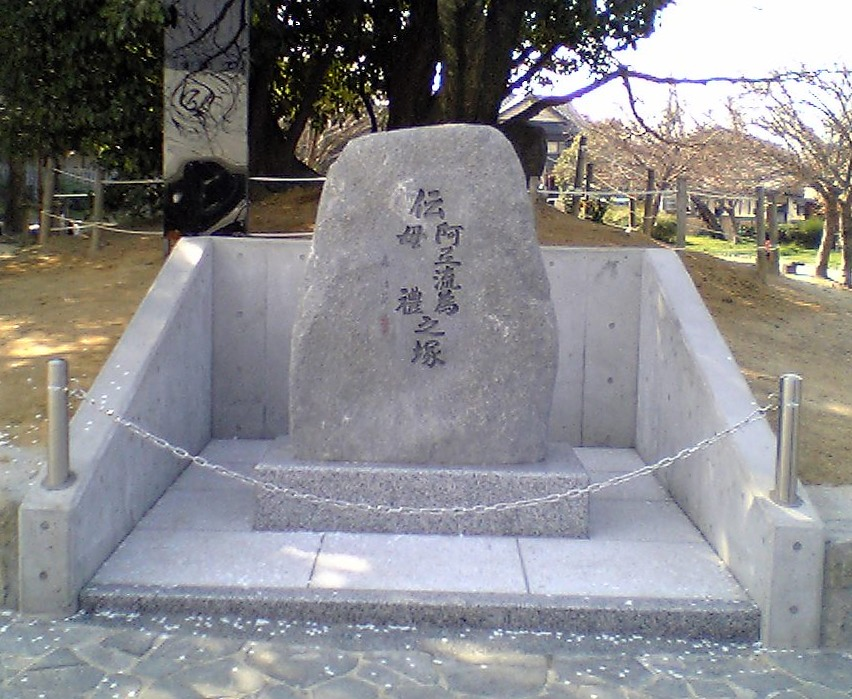
Monument to Aterui

Aterui (アテルイ) (died 13 September 802 AD, in the 21st year of the Enryaku era) was a chief of the Isawa (胆沢) band of Emishi in northern Japan. The Emishi were an indigenous people of North Japan, who were considered hirsute barbarians by the Yamato Japanese.

== Life ==
Aterui was born in Isawa, Hitakami-no-kuni, what is now Mizusawa Ward of Ōshū City in southern Iwate Prefecture. Nothing is known of his life until the battle of Sufuse Village in 787. In 786, Ki no Asami Kosami was appointed by the Emperor Kanmu as the new General of Eastern Conquest and given a commission to conquer Aterui. In June 787, Kosami split his army in two and sent them north from Koromogawa on each side of the Kitakami River hoping to surprise Aterui at his home in Mizusawa. Burning houses and crops as they went, they were surprised when Emishi cavalry swept down from the hills to the East and pushed them into the river. Over 1,000 armored infantry drowned in the river weighed down by their heavy armor. In September, Kosami returned to Kyoto where he was rebuked by the emperor Kammu for his failure.

Another attack in 795 was unsuccessful as well, and it was not until 801 that any Japanese general could claim success against the Emishi. In that year, Sakanoue no Tamuramaro, who had previously been appointed to the positions of Supervisory Delegate of Michinoku and Ideha and Governor of Michinoku, General of the Peace Guard and Grand General of Conquering East-Barbarians (Sei-i Taishōgun), was given a commission by Emperor Kanmu to subjugate the Emishi. He and his 40,000 troops were somewhat successful as he reported back to the emperor on September 27, "We conquered the Emishi rebels."

But still the Emishi leaders Aterui and More eluded capture. In 802, Tamuramaro returned to Michinoku and built Fort Isawa in the heart of Isawa territory. Then, on April 15, he reported the most important success of all in this campaign: The Emishi leaders Aterui and More surrendered with more than 500 warriors. General Sakanoue delivered Aterui and More to the capital on July 10. Despite General Sakanoue's pleadings the government, "cut them down at Moriyama in Kawachi Province".

This was a major moment in the history of the Emishi conquest. Before this time, the Japanese had adhered to a policy of deporting captured women and children to Western Japan then enticing their warrior husbands and fathers to join their families in their new homes. Captured warriors had not been killed either. The executions of Aterui and More are thought to have been responsible for the fierce resistance by the Emishi over the next hundred years or so. The Yamato Chotei acted this way probably out of fear for Aterui military prowess, and according to some Japanese, Aterui was deported outside of the capital before his execution due to the North-East Demon's Gate (kimon) superstition from Onmyōdō, and so it would have been an attempt by Emperor Kanmu to protect the Capital against the ghost of Aterui.

The head of King Aterui was buried at Katano-jinja, a shrine who may have been linked with Aterui's ancestors, by shōgun Sakanoue no Tamuramaro, out of respect for his enemy. Annual private ceremonies have been held for King Aterui by the Shinto priests for the last 1200 years.

For many Japanese, he was long demonized as the "Lord of the Bad Road" (悪路王 Akuro-ō). "Aku" can also be mean "ferocious" and "strong", not only "evil".

== References in media ==
Aterui folklore has been made into many plays and an anime (Aterui the Second). In January 2013, dramatization of Aterui's life, Fiery Enmity: Hero of the North (火怨・北の英雄 アテルイ伝), starring Takao Osawa in the title role, which was broadcast on NHK. Aterui is also a supporting character in Shin Teito Monogatari, the prequel to the bestselling historical fantasy novel Teito Monogatari (Hiroshi Aramata).

7590 Aterui (1992 UP4) is an asteroid discovered on October 26, 1992, by K. Endate and K. Watanabe.

== See also ==
- Ainu
- List of people from Iwate
