= Hanamaki Onsenkyō Prefectural Natural Park =

Natural park of Iwate prefecture, Japan

- 花巻温泉郷県立自然公園
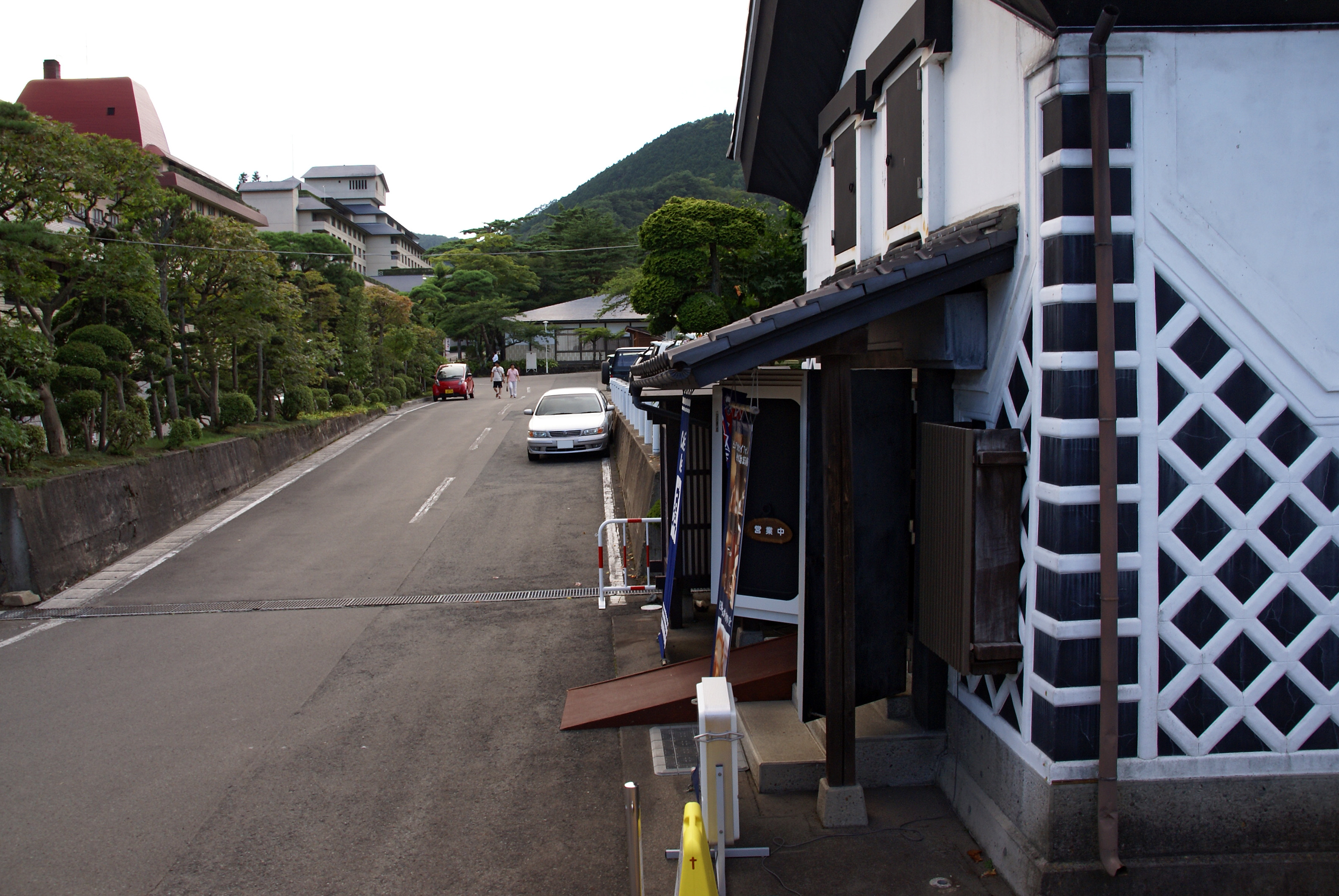
- Hanamaki Onsen
- Interactive map of Hanamaki Onsenkyō Prefectural Natural Park
- Location: Iwate Prefecture, Japan
- Nearest city: Hanamaki
- Coordinates: 39°26′56″N 141°04′22″E
- Area: 15.87 km^{2} (6.13 sq mi)
- Established: 8 May 1961

Hanamaki Onsenkyō Prefectural Natural Park (花巻温泉郷県立自然公園, Hanamaki Onsenkyō kenritsu shizen kōen) is a Prefectural Natural Park in Iwate Prefecture, Japan. Established in 1961, the park is wholly within the municipality of Hanamaki.
