= Goyōzan Prefectural Natural Park =

Prefectural Natural Park in Iwate Prefecture, Japan

- 五葉山県立自然公園
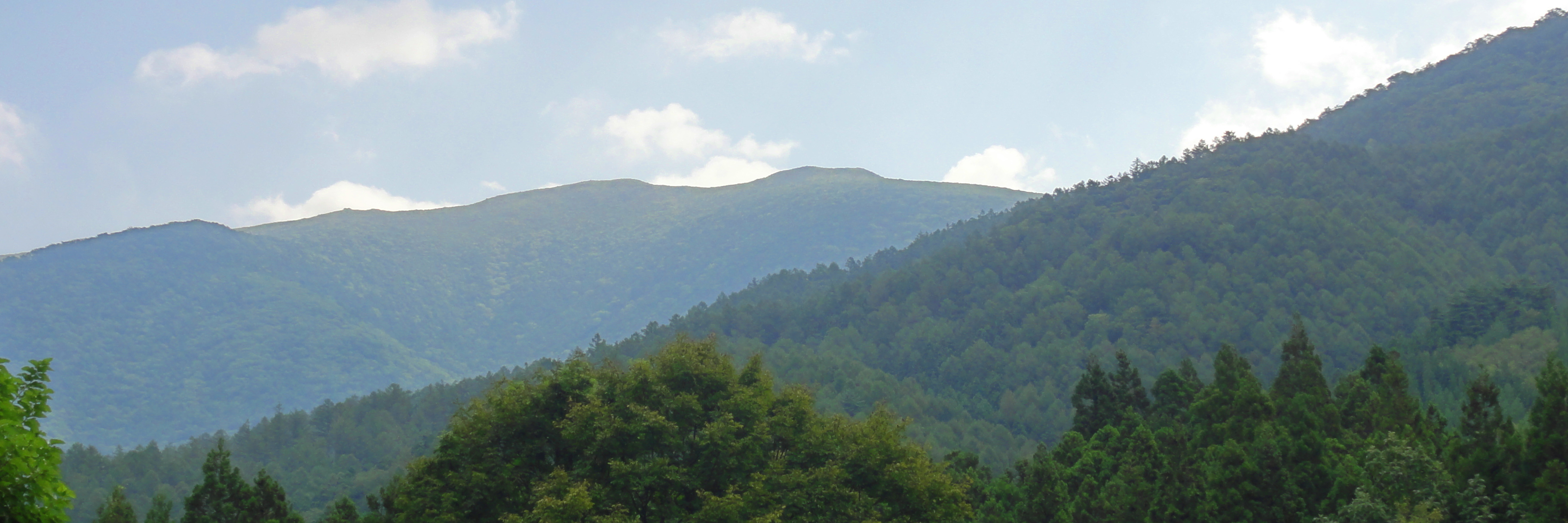
- Mount Goyō
- Interactive map of Goyōzan Prefectural Natural Park
- Location: Iwate Prefecture, Japan
- Coordinates: 39°11′54″N 141°43′02″E
- Area: 59.18 km^{2} (22.85 sq mi)
- Established: 1 June 1966

Goyōzan Prefectural Natural Park (五葉山県立自然公園, Goyōzan kenritsu shizen kōen) is a Prefectural Natural Park in Iwate Prefecture, Japan. Established in 1966, the park spans the municipalities of Ōfunato, Kamaishi and Sumita. The central feature of the park is Mount Goyō (五葉山).

== See also ==
- National Parks of Japan
