= Cherry tree (disambiguation) =

Cherry Tree may refer to:

- A bush that produces cherries
- An ornamental cherry bush that produces cherry blossoms

== Places ==
=== United Kingdom ===
- Cherry Tree, Lancashire
  - Location of Cherry Tree railway station

=== United States ===
- Cherry Tree, Indiana, a suburb of Carmel, Indiana, United States
- Cherry Tree, Oklahoma
- Cherry Tree, Pennsylvania, a borough in Indiana County, Pennsylvania, United States
- Cherrytree Township, Pennsylvania, United States

== Music ==
- "The Cherry Trees", song by Ivor Gurney
- "The Cherry-Tree Carol", a ballad with the rare distinction of being both a Christmas carol and one of the Child Ballads
- Cherrytree Records, an imprint of Interscope Records founded in 2005 by Martin Kierszenbaum
- "Cherry Tree", a song by 10,000 Maniacs from their 1987 album In My Tribe
- Cherry Tree (EP), an EP by The National released 2004

== Other uses ==
- Cherry Tree Park, a park in Herttoniemi, Helsinki, Finland
- George Washington's cherry tree anecdote, story about first US President's childhood honesty
- Rock-Breaking Cherry Tree, a 400-year-old cherry tree growing out of a granite boulder in Morioka, Iwate in northern Japan
- Cherry Tree, a literary journal published by Washington College
- Mayoi no Sakura, the Guidepost Cherry Tree in Kodaira, Tokyo

== See also ==
- Cherry (disambiguation)
- The Cherrytree Sessions (disambiguation)
