= List of cultural properties of Japan – paintings (Iwate) =

This list is of the cultural properties of Japan designated in the category of paintings (絵画, kaiga) for the Prefecture of Iwate.

== National Cultural Properties ==
As of 1 July 2019, one National Treasure has been designated.

Property	Date	Municipality	Ownership	Comments	Image	Dimensions	Coordinates	Ref.
*Golden Light Sutra with Gold-Letter Pagodas, colour on indigo paper 紺紙著色金光明最勝王経金字宝塔曼荼羅図 konshi chakushoku konkōmyō saishō ōkyō kinji hōtō mandara zu	Heian period (late C12)	Hiraizumi	Chūson-ji Daichōju-in	10 scrolls			39°00′09″N 141°05′59″E	

== Prefectural Cultural Properties ==
As of 2019, nine properties have been designated at a prefectural level.

Property	Date	Municipality	Ownership	Comments	Image	Dimensions	Coordinates	Ref.
Temple Founder Mutei Ryōshō, colour on silk 絹本著色開山良韶画像 kenpon chakushoku kaizan Ryōshō gazō	c.1360	Ōshū	Shōbō-ji (正法寺)	with accompanying text or gasan by Ryōshō dating to Enbun 5		72.5 centimetres (28.5 in) by 36.5 centimetres (14.4 in)	39°04′05″N 141°13′29″E	
Aizen Myōō, colour on silk 絹本著色愛染明王画像 kenpon chakushoku Aizen Myōō gazō	Muromachi period	Rikuzentakata	Fumon-ji (普門寺)			184 centimetres (72 in) by 98 centimetres (39 in)	39°01′34″N 141°39′25″E	
Tachibana, lacquer painting (large ema) 漆絵立花図（大絵馬） urushi-e rikka zu (dai ema)	c.1716	Ninohe	Tendai-ji (天台寺)	dated by the inscription to Shōtoku 6		181.3 centimetres (71.4 in) by 126.7 centimetres (49.9 in)	40°11′54″N 141°11′12″E	
Sixteen Arhats, colour on silk 絹本著色十六羅漢像 kenpon chakushoku jūroku rakan zō	Nanboku-chō period	Ōshū	Shōbō-ji (正法寺)	16 scrolls		94.3 centimetres (37.1 in) to 95.5 centimetres (37.6 in) by 45.3 centimetres (17.8 in) to 46.6 centimetres (18.3 in)	39°04′05″N 141°13′29″E	
Nirvana painting 仏涅槃図; Butsu nehan zu	1420	Tōno	Jōraku-ji (常楽寺)	restored in 1769		180.1 centimetres (70.9 in) by 100.3 centimetres (39.5 in)	39°16′20″N 141°25′23″E	
Thirteen Buddhas 十三仏 jūsan Butsu	Muromachi period	Tōno	Jōraku-ji (常楽寺)			109 centimetres (43 in) by 36.4 centimetres (14.3 in)	39°16′20″N 141°25′23″E	
Shō Kannon 聖観音菩薩画像; Shō Kannon Bosatsu gazō	1512	Ōshū	Jishō-in (自性院)	ita-e; the wooden board formerly served as the back panel of a miniature shrine		114.5 centimetres (45.1 in) by 44.5 centimetres (17.5 in)	39°10′33″N 141°16′52″E	
Tatara-gami, colour on paper 紙本著色たたら神図 shihon chakushoku Tatara-gami zu	C17	Iwaizumi	private	the tatara furnace god		120 centimetres (47 in) by 74 centimetres (29 in)	39°50′35″N 141°47′37″E	
Kaji-gami, colour on paper 紙本著色鍛冶神図 shihon chakushoku Kaji-gami zu	C17	Morioka	Iwate Prefectural Museum	the blacksmith god; 3 scrolls		104 centimetres (41 in) by 57.4 centimetres (22.6 in)	39°45′20″N 141°09′14″E	

== See also ==
- Cultural Properties of Japan
- List of National Treasures of Japan (paintings)
- Japanese painting
- List of Historic Sites of Japan (Iwate)
- Iwate Museum of Art
