= Iwate Prefectural Museum =

- 岩手県立博物館
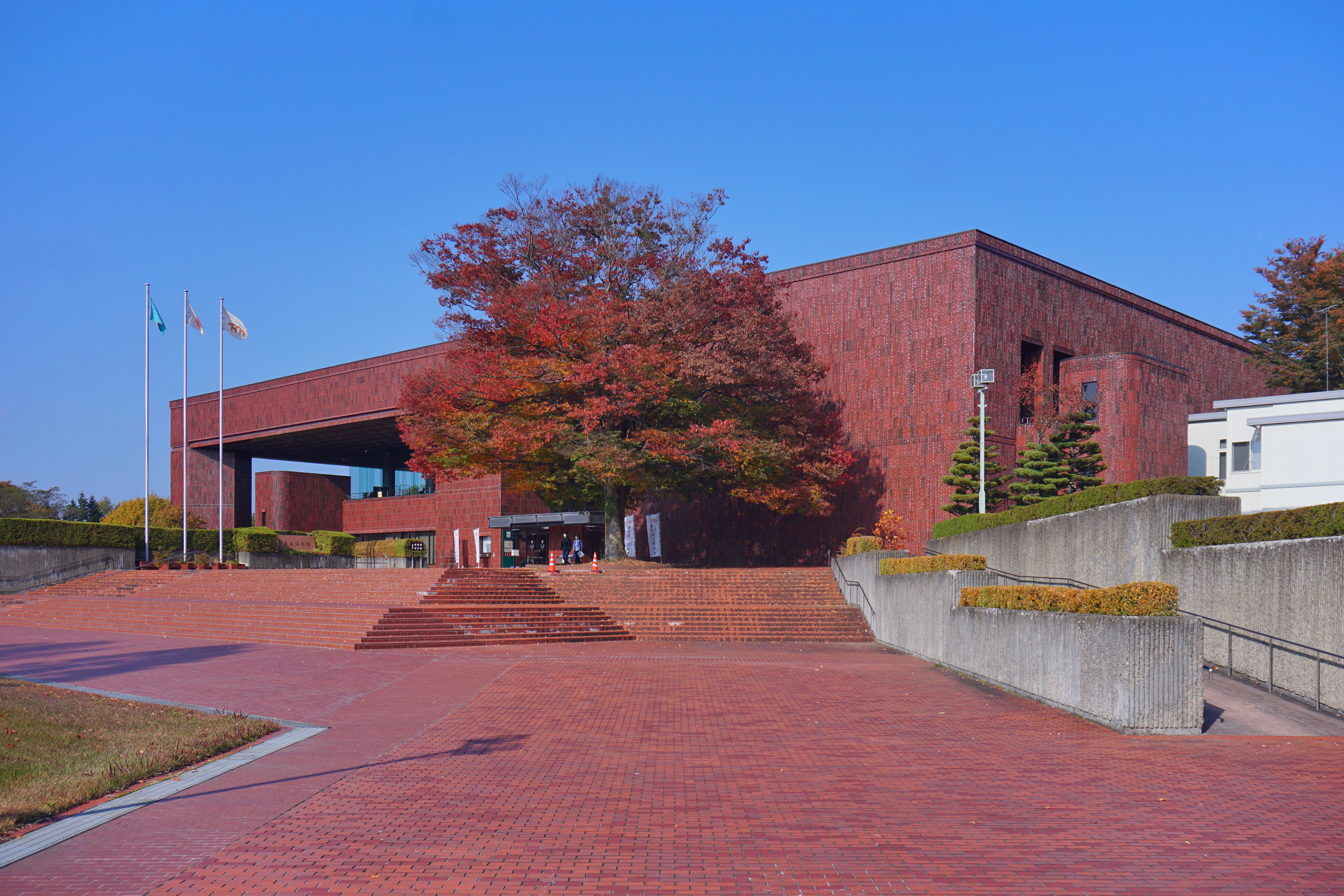
- Interactive map of the Iwate Prefectural Museum area

General information
- Location: 34 Matsuyashiki, Ueda, Morioka, Iwate Prefecture, Japan
- Coordinates: 39°45′20″N 141°09′14″E
- Opened: October 1980

Website
- Official website

Iwate Prefectural Museum (岩手県立博物館, Iwate Kenritsu Hakubutsukan) opened in Morioka, Iwate Prefecture, Japan in 1980. The collection relates to the geology, natural history, archaeology, history, and folklore of Iwate Prefecture.

== See also ==
- Mutsu Province
- List of Historic Sites of Japan (Iwate)
- List of Cultural Properties of Japan - paintings (Iwate)
- Iwate Museum of Art
