= Nichidatsu Fujii =

Japanese Buddhist monk (1885–1985)

Personal life
- Born: 6 August 1885 Japan
- Died: 9 January 1985 (aged 99)
- Known for: Peace Pagoda

Religious life
- Religion: Buddhism
- Founder of: Nipponzan-Myōhōji order of Buddhism

Nichidatsu Fujii (藤井 日達, Fujii Nichidatsu; August 6, 1885 – January 9, 1985) was a Japanese Buddhist monk, and founder of the Nipponzan-Myōhōji order of Buddhism. He is best known for his decision in 1947 to begin constructing Peace Pagodas in many locations around the world as shrines to world peace.

Fujii was born into a peasant family in the wilderness of the Aso Caldera. At the age of 19, he was ordained a monk in the unusually ascetic and intellectual tradition of Hōon-ji in Usuki, Ōita. He started missionary activities in Manchuria in 1917, but the Great Kanto earthquake made him return to Japan in 1923. After reading Nichiren's declaration that the Lotus Sutra would one day be preached in India, he decided to go there. He arrived in Calcutta in January 1931 and walked throughout the town chanting the daimoku and beating a drum, a practice known as gyakku shōdai.

In 1933, he met Mahatma Gandhi at his ashram in Wardha. Gandhi was honored by his presence, and added the daimoku to his ashram's prayers. He also gifted a small statue of Three Wise Monkeys to Gandhi. During World War II and despite the dangers to himself he declared himself in favour of pacifism and went round Japan actively promoting it. He later recollected: "The Pacific war raged ever more brutally. I could no longer...keep silent about the war, in which people were killing one another. Thus I traveled through the whole of Japan and preached resistance against the war and [advocated] the prayer for peace. It was a time in which any person who only spoke about resistance to the war, would go to prison because of that alone".

== Peace pagodas ==
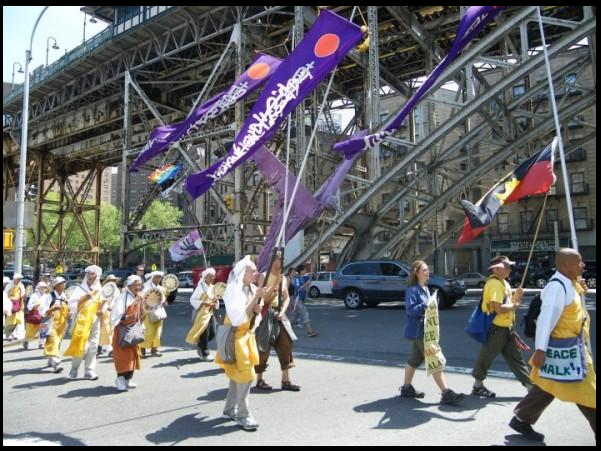
Nipponzan Myohoji peace walk to the UN

Beginning in the Cold War period, he preached noninvolvement and did hunger strikes for peace. He wrote:

The reason I came to espouse nonviolent resistance and the antiwar, antiarms position was not because I met with Mr. Gandhi. Rather, it was because the atomic bomb was dropped on Hiroshima and Nagasaki, killing hundreds of thousands of innocent women and children, burning and poisoning [the population], a tragedy without precedent in human history, leading Japan to sue for unconditional surrender. In this we see the mad, stupid, barbaric nature of modern warfare.

The first Peace Pagodas were built as a symbol of peace in the Japanese cities of Hiroshima and Nagasaki where the atomic bombs took the lives of over 150,000 people, almost all of whom were civilian, at the end of World War II. Fujii returned to India and built a World Peace Pagoda in Rajgir, in 1965. He also built a Japanese style temple in Rajgir which is still inhabited today.

By 2000, at least 80 Peace Pagodas had been built around the world in Europe, Asia, and the United States, though not all are due to his movement.

While the Pagodas have been one expression of their call for peace, Nipponzan-Myōhōji also has carried its prayers to the world in numerous walks. Since 1976, when a group joined the Continental Walk for Disarmament and Social Justice across the United States, their presence has been an important part of many movements for peace and justice. "We must go out among the people." Fujii taught. "In the Sutra there is a line that states, 'So this man, practicing in the world, shall disperse the gloom of living.' Religion, which does not 'go' will not be able to provide the relief which must be brought about." The prayers of the Daimoku are to disperse this gloom. "Religion becomes isolated from the happenings of the world because it tends to be occupied in seeking solutions to one's own spiritual matters. If we fail to prevent a nuclear holocaust, one's desire for security is nothing but a dream. All must be awakened."

== See also ==
- Nichidatsu Fujii's movement
- Nichiren
- Nipponzan-Myōhōji
- Peace pagoda
- Peace walk
- Terasawa Junsei

== Works ==
- Nichidatsu Fujii; My Non Violence: An Autobiography of a Japanese Buddhist; Japan Buddha Sangha Press 1975
- Nichidatsu Fujii; Buddhism for World Peace; Japan-Bharat Sarvodaya Mitrata Sangha 1980
- Nichidatsu Fujii, Yumiko Miyazaki; Bow to the Buddha in You: Dharma Talks and Writings of the Most Venerable Nichidatsu Fujii; Nipponzan Myohoji 2009 ISBN 0979129818
