= Three great noodles of Morioka =

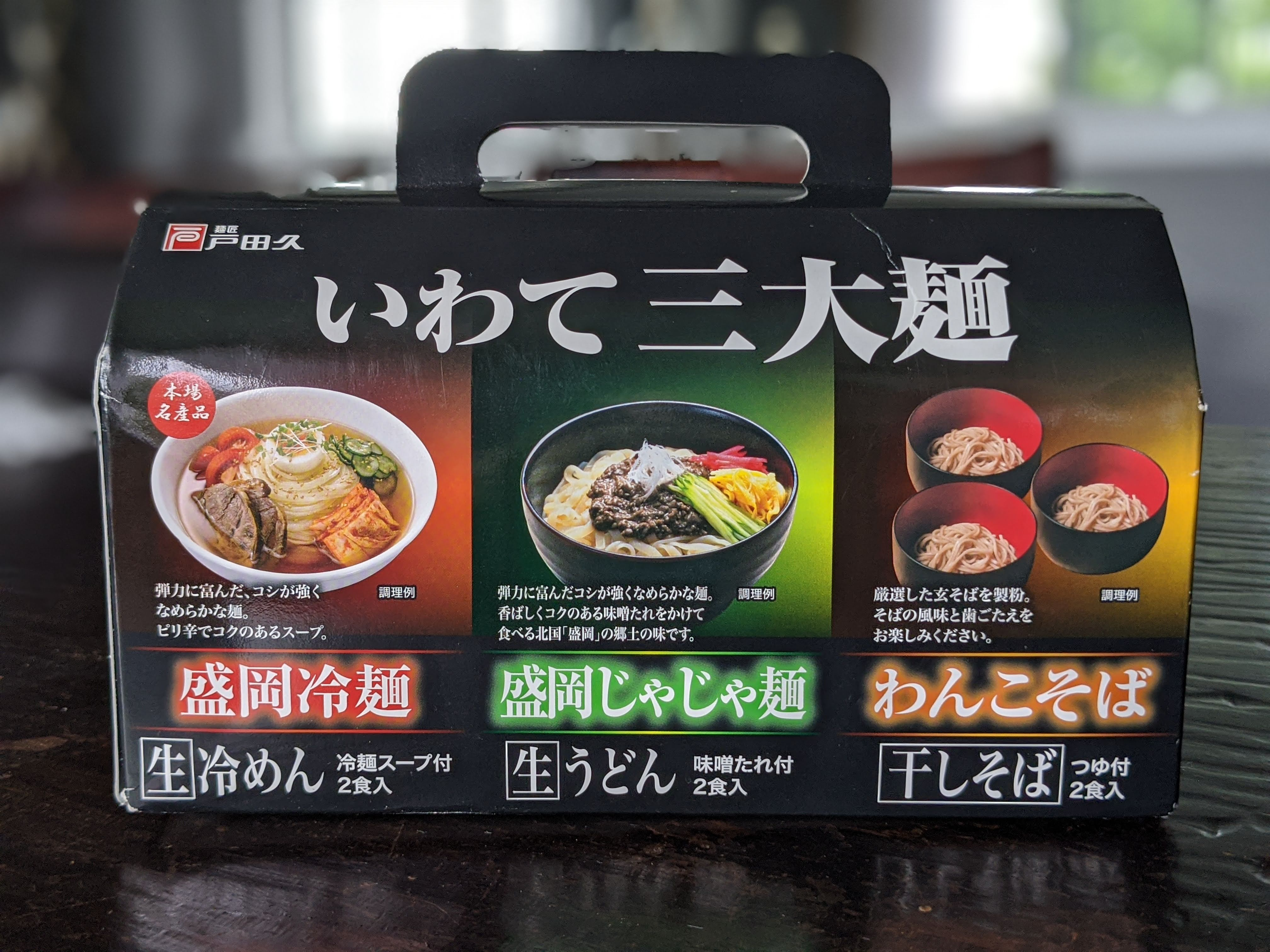
A home cooking kit containing the three great noodles

Three great noodles of Morioka (Japanese: 盛岡三大麺; rōmaji: Morioka san dai men) is a term to describe the noodle dishes Morioka reimen, Morioka jajamen, and wanko soba of the city of Morioka, Iwate Prefecture, Japan.

- Morioka reimen (Japanese: 盛岡冷麺) is a cold noodle dish based on Korean naengmyeon.
- Morioka jajamen (Japanese: 盛岡じゃじゃ麺) is a dish with meat miso on thin udon noodles, based on Chinese zhajiangmian.
- Wanko soba (Japanese: わんこそば) is a style of Japanese soba, served in many small bite-sized bowls.
