= Nichidatsu Fujii's movement =

In 1981, Nichidatsu Fujii initiated an international peace march involving followers of Nipponzan Myōhōji, who travelled in four directions around the world to promote nuclear disarmament ahead of the United Nations Second Special Session on Disarmament in June 1982.

In the U.S., marchers began in New Orleans, Los Angeles and San Francisco, and in Canada, marchers began in Montreal and Toronto. The San Francisco March began on Oct. 21, 1981 with a ceremony on Alcatraz. 13 marchers, being Buddhist followers of Nipponzan-Myōhōji, Native Americans, U.S. and German citizens, began the S.F. march. marching about 20 mile per day they were hosted each night by community groups in every town and on Native reservations. many mayors and town councils made proclamations and such honoring the peace and disarmament marchers. Over the course of the march citizens were moved to join. By the time they arrived in Chicago the S.F. marchers numbered about 30. In May 1982 the group of about 40 marchers from Toronto joined the S.F. group in Buffalo N.Y. at the International Peace Bridge doubling the size of the group. Through the state of N.Y. 10 to 20 people joined the march daily. When the S.F. group walked across the George Washington Bridge they numbered about 300. The groups on other march routes also grew over the 7 months. On June 12, 1982, in Central Park Nipponzan-Myōhōji marchers from the U.S.A., Europe, Africa, and Asia, joined with mobilization for survival organizers and religious and peace groups from around the world in a peaceful demonstration for disarmament of many million people.
