= Morioka reimen =

Japanese dish of cold noodles

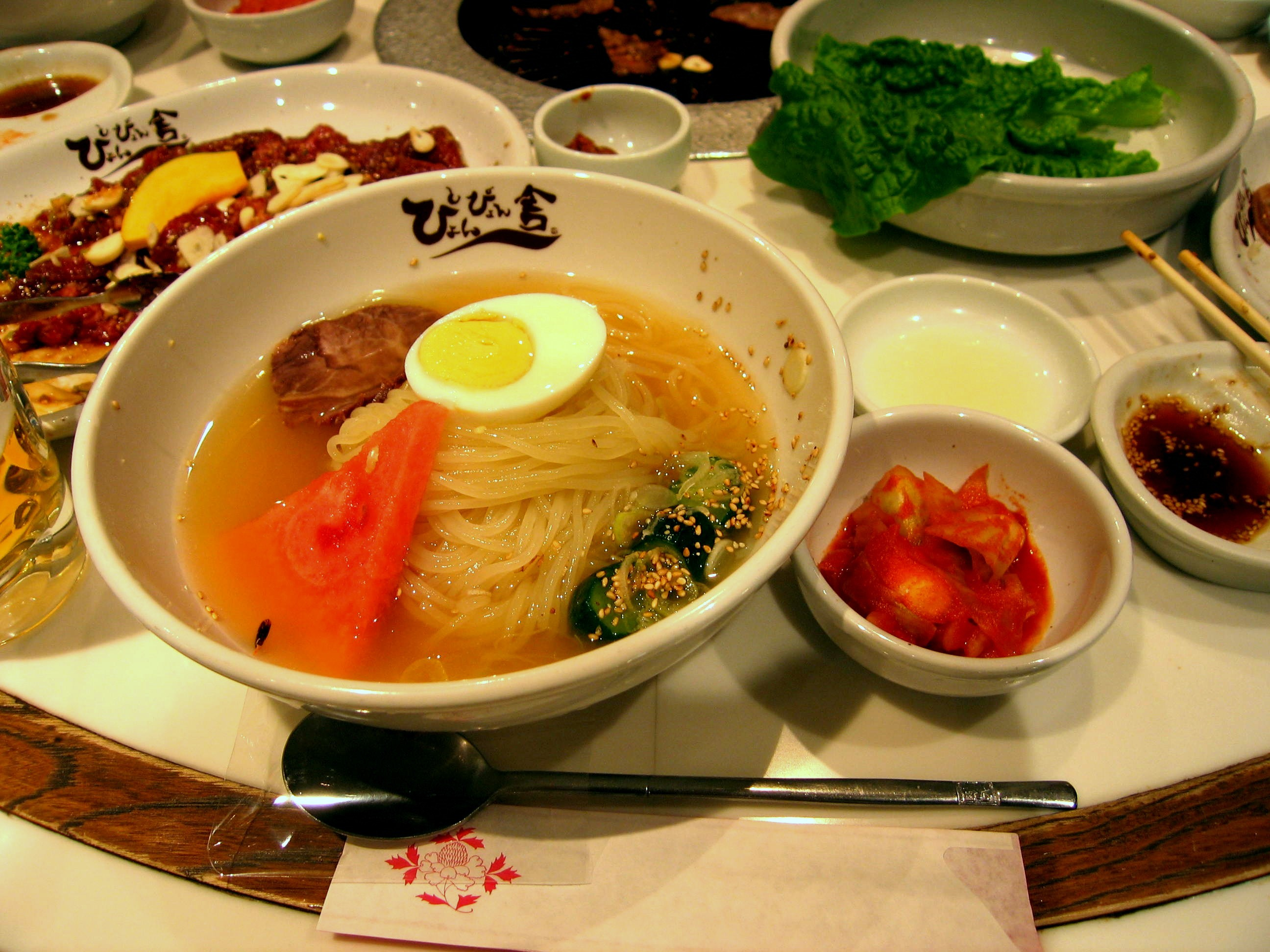
- Alternative names: Morioka cold noodle
- Type: Noodle
- Place of origin: Northern Korea (original); Japan (introduced)
- Region or state: Morioka, Iwate Prefecture
- Associated cuisine: Korean
- Created by: Teruhito Aoki (Japanese: 青木輝人)
- Invented: 1954
- Similar dishes: Hamhung Cold Noodles

Morioka reimen (Japanese: 盛岡冷麵) is a local dish of Morioka, Iwate Prefecture. It is a cold noodle dish and one of the three great noodles of Morioka, along with Morioka jajamen and Wanko soba. It is known for its chewy noodles, rich chilled broth, and toppings of kimchi. It is based on the Korean dish naengmyeon.

== Overview ==
The noodles used in Morioka Reimen are made with potato starch, wheat flour, and white buckwheat flour. They are semi-translucent in appearance and get their chewy texture by being formed by extrusion. The broth is made from a combination of chicken stock and beef stock. With soy sauce and dried shitake mushrooms added. It is topped with a hard boiled egg, beef shank or chashu pork, cucumber, kimchi, and seasonal fruit such as apple or watermelon.

== History ==
The Morioka style of cold noodle was brought to Japan by ethnic Korean Yang Yong-cheol (Korean: 양용철; Hanja: 楊龍哲). He was born in 1914 in Hamhung, Kankyōnan Province, Korea, Empire of Japan; his birthplace is now in North Korea. In March 1938, he went to Japan. In 1940, under the sōshi-kaimei laws, he adopted the Japanese name Teruhito Aoki (青木輝人).

In 1954, Aoki opened a yakiniku restaurant called Shokudoen (食道園) and served cold noodles on the menu. Using his memory he recreated the taste of his hometown with Japanese ingredients. Slowly the noodles became popular in Morioka. Other restaurants started to open up and also served the cold noodles. By the mid-1980s a gourmet boom elevated the cold noodles to national fame. They started to be known as Morioka reimen, instead of just reimen.

== Differences from raengmyon (naengmyeon) ==
Pyongyang raengmyon uses mainly buckwheat flour, but the noodles of Morioka reimen are mainly potato starch and have a transparent look. Pyongyang raengmyon noodles are also thinner and not as strong as Morioka reimen.

The raengmyon from Hamhung can be separated into two types: bibim-raengmyon, served without broth but mixed with chili paste, and mul-raengmyon, served in a clear broth that typically combines beef broth with dongchimi (radish water kimchi). While the broth is different, the strength of Morioka reimen is close to that of Hamhung raengmyon but with thicker noodles.

== Gallery ==
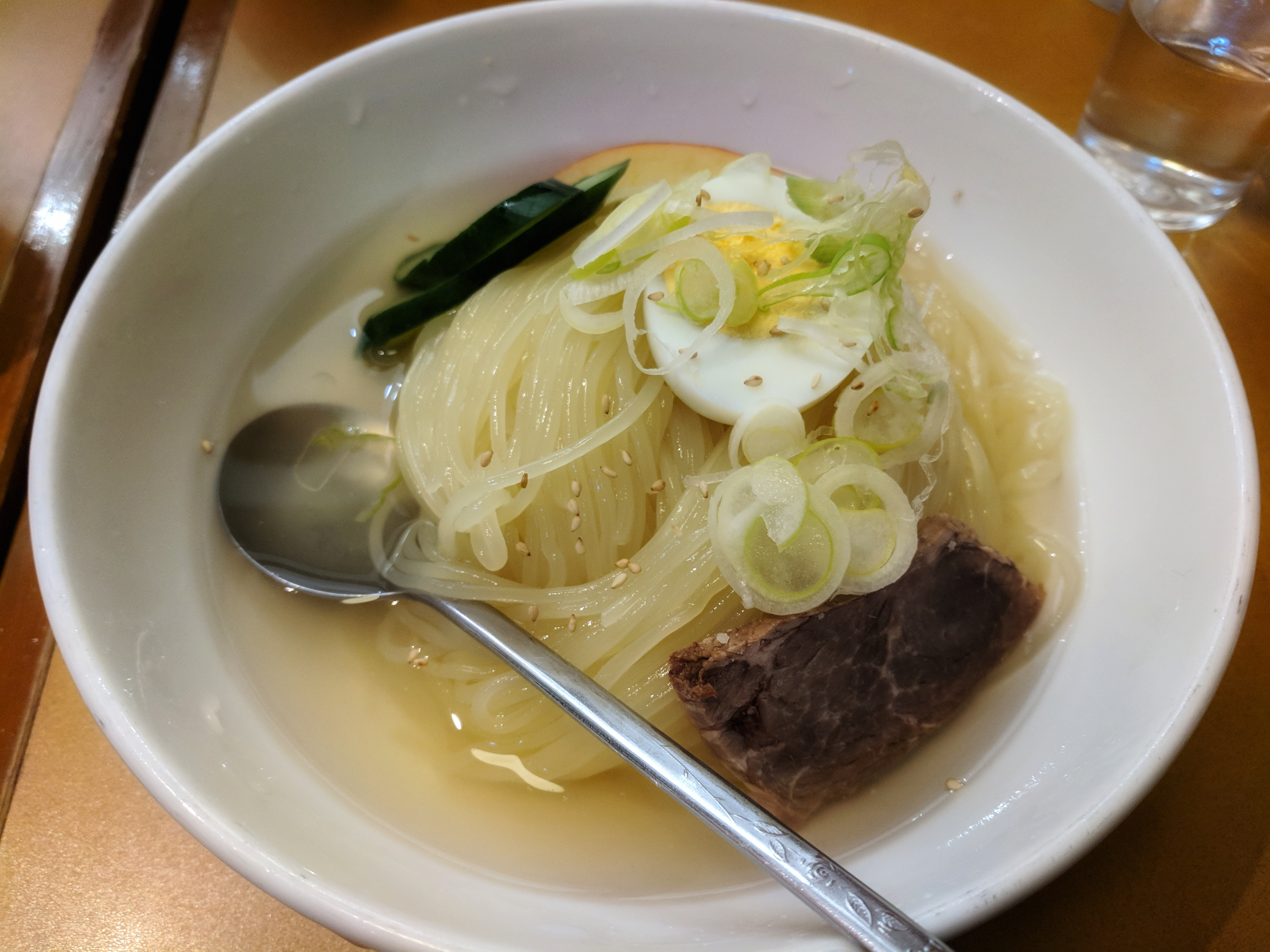

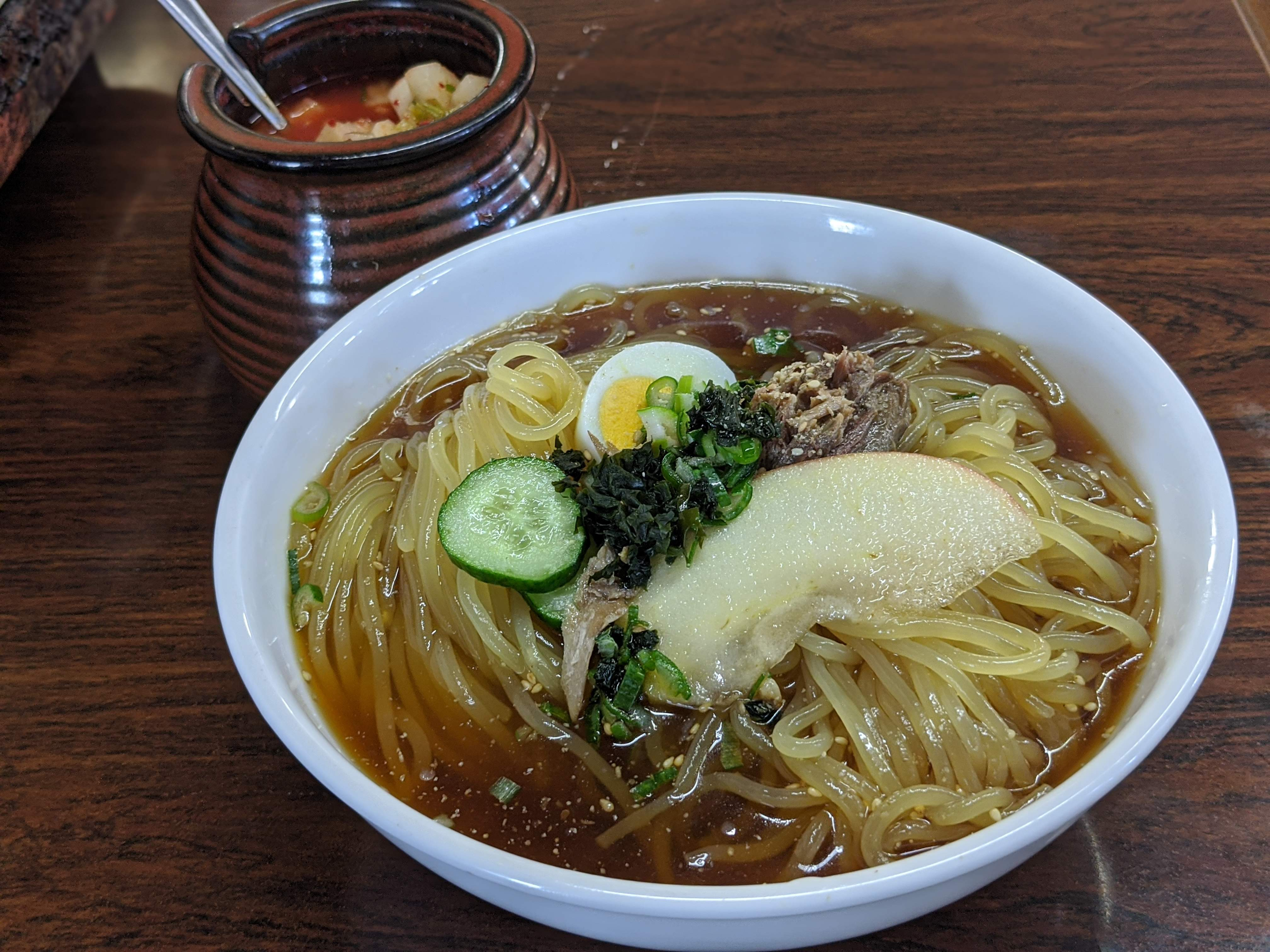

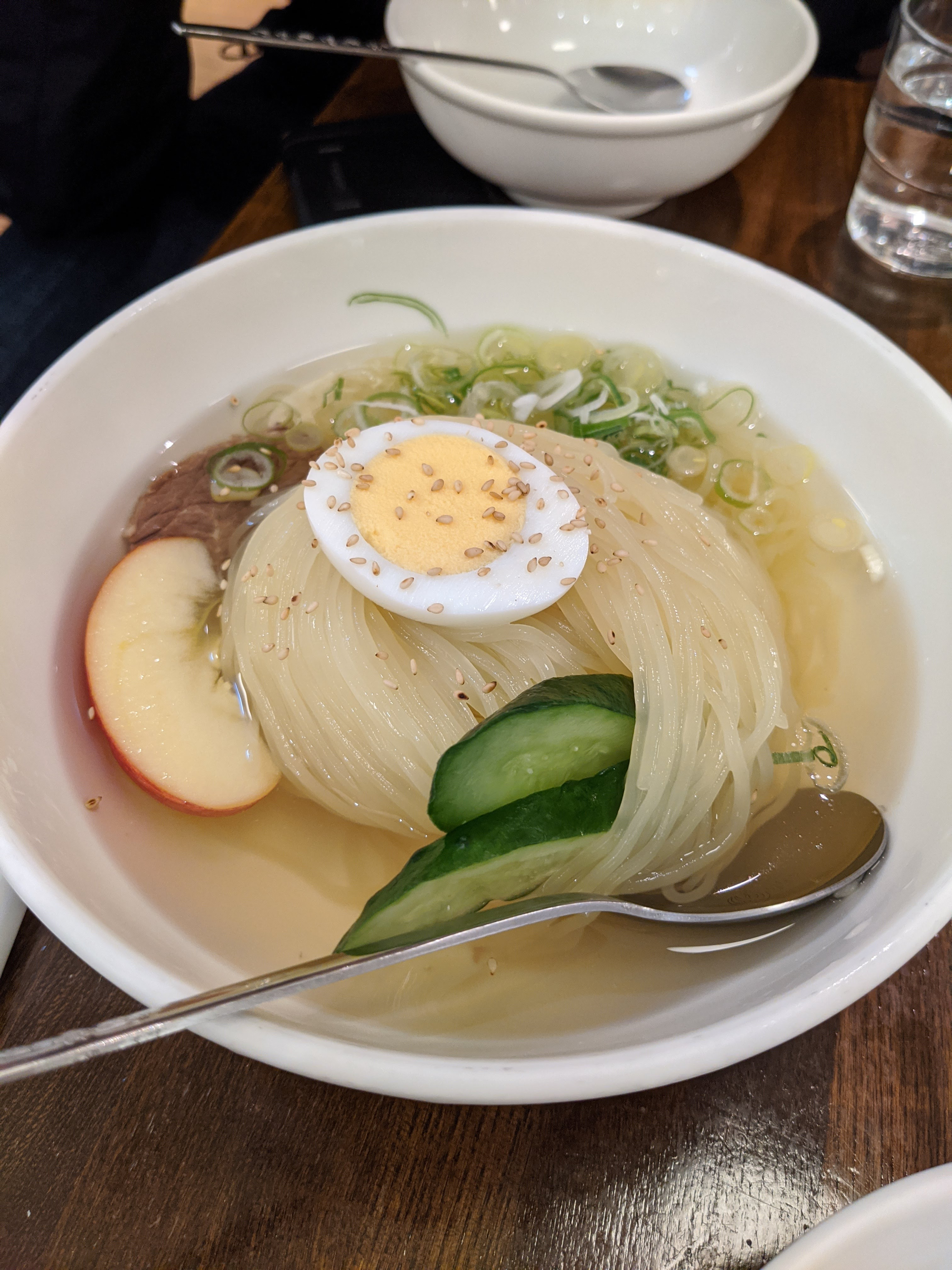

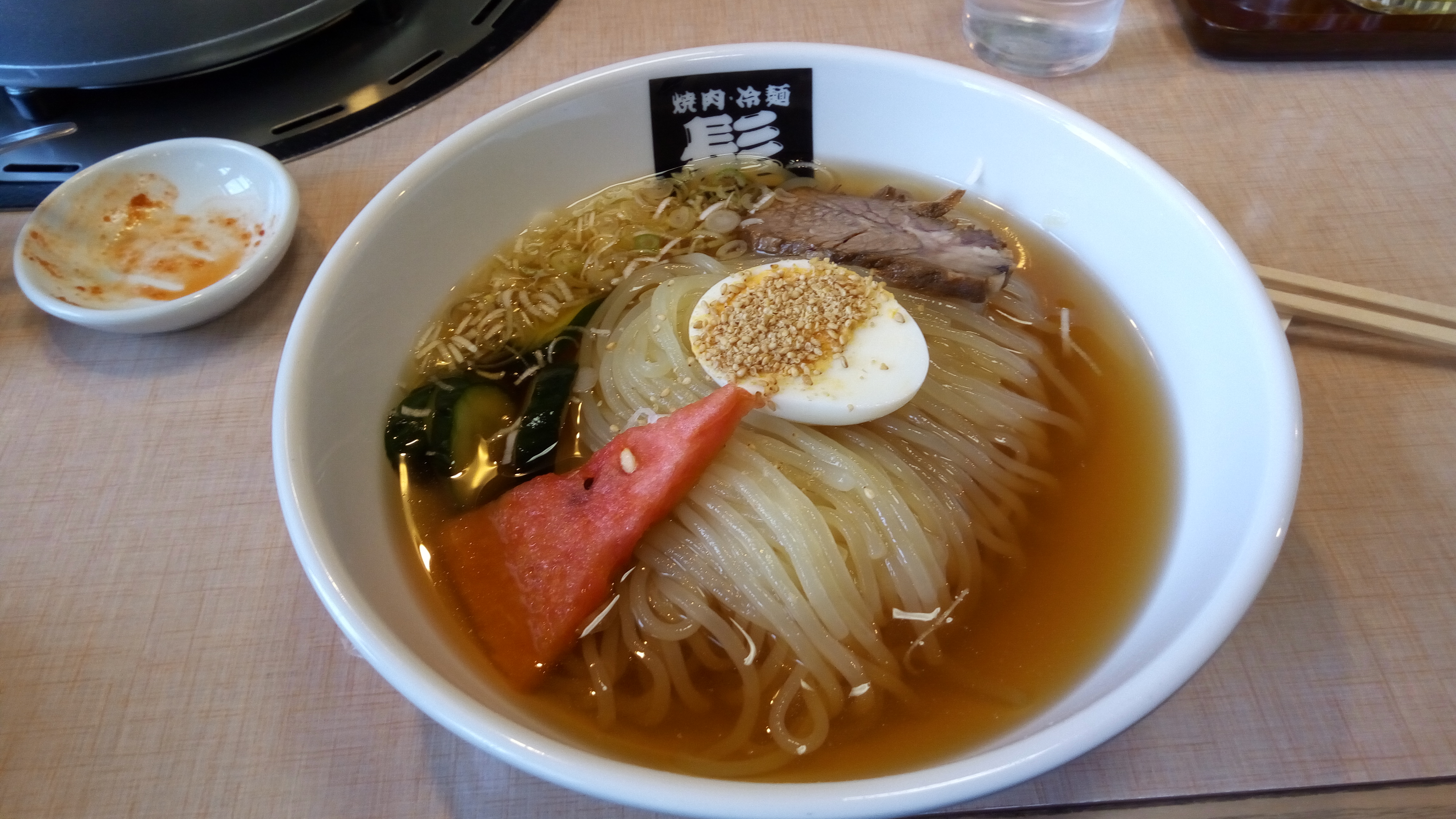

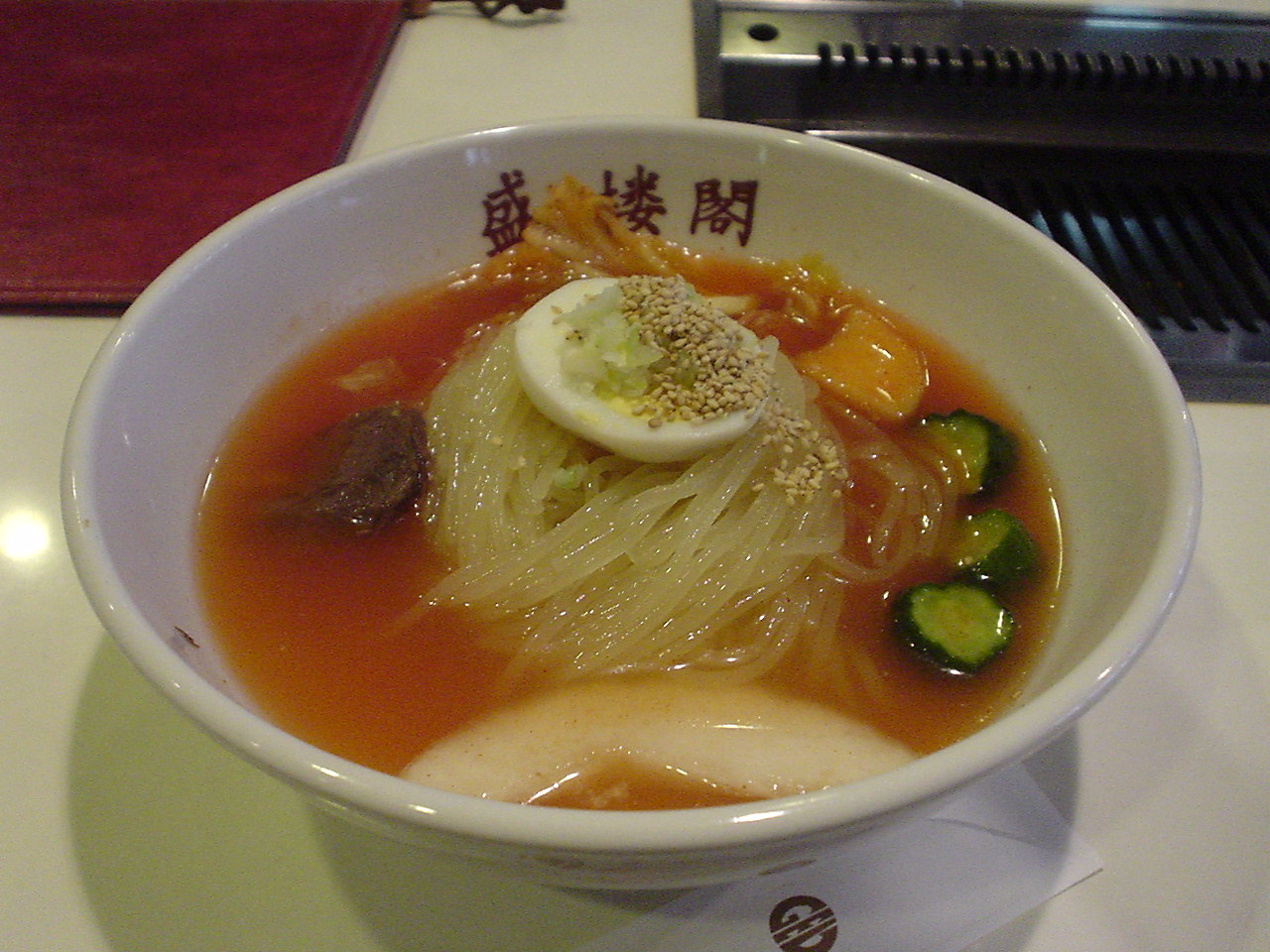
