= Kozukata =

Kozukata (不来方 or 古志方) is an old name for the area that is now occupied by the center of the city of Morioka, Iwate Prefecture, Japan. Nanbu Toshinao (1576 – 1632), head of the Nanbu clan, took control of Kozukata after his participation in the Battle of Sekigahara in 1600. Toshinao disliked the name "Kozukata", and changed it first to "Morigaoka" and later "Morioka" early in the Edo period (1603 – 1868).

Literally meaning "come-not-way", a folk etymology for the name states that it derives from the legend that the demon Rasetsu, after he was driven out of the area, will never return.
