= Morioka jajamen =

Japanese-style Chinese noodle dish

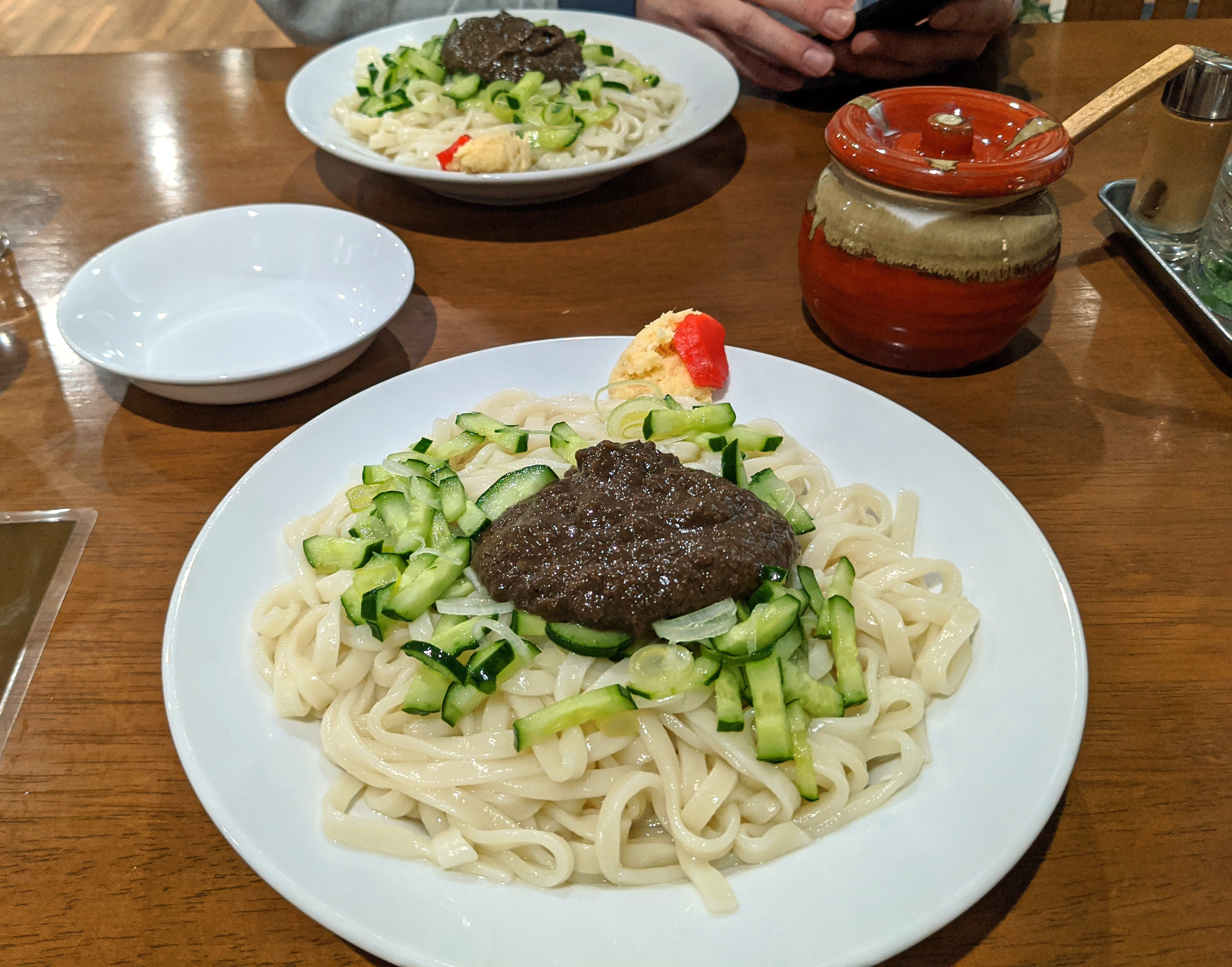
- Place of origin: China (origin); Morioka, Iwate Prefecture (adaptation)
- Region or state: East Asia
- Associated cuisine: Japanese
- Created by: Takashina Kanshou
- Variations: Jajangmyeon, Zhajiangmian

Morioka jajamen (盛岡じゃじゃ麺) is a Japanese-style Chinese noodle dish that is part of the local cuisine of Morioka, Iwate Prefecture. It is one of the three great noodles of Morioka, along with Morioka reimen and wanko soba. The dish is based on zhajiangmian introduced from China.

== History ==
Before World War II Takashina Kanshou (高階貫勝) visited Manchukuo, now Northeast China, and ate zhajiangmian. In 1945 he returned to his hometown in Morioka and brought the dish with him. He recreated the miso paste many times on his return and incorporated the opinions of his customers to create a taste that was popular with the locals of Morioka. It eventually evolved into a unique dish that is now a specialty of Morioka with many restaurants and izakayas offering it.

== Overview ==
Morioka jajamen uses a thin udon noodle. It is served with a scoop of meat miso, which is a combination of minced pork, onion, dried shiitake mushrooms, water, vegetable oil, sake, garlic, ginger, miso, mentsuyu, sugar, black ground sesame, and sesame oil. It is then garnished with cucumber, spring onions, and ginger. After mixing the dish, vinegar, chilli oil, or garlic can be added to taste.

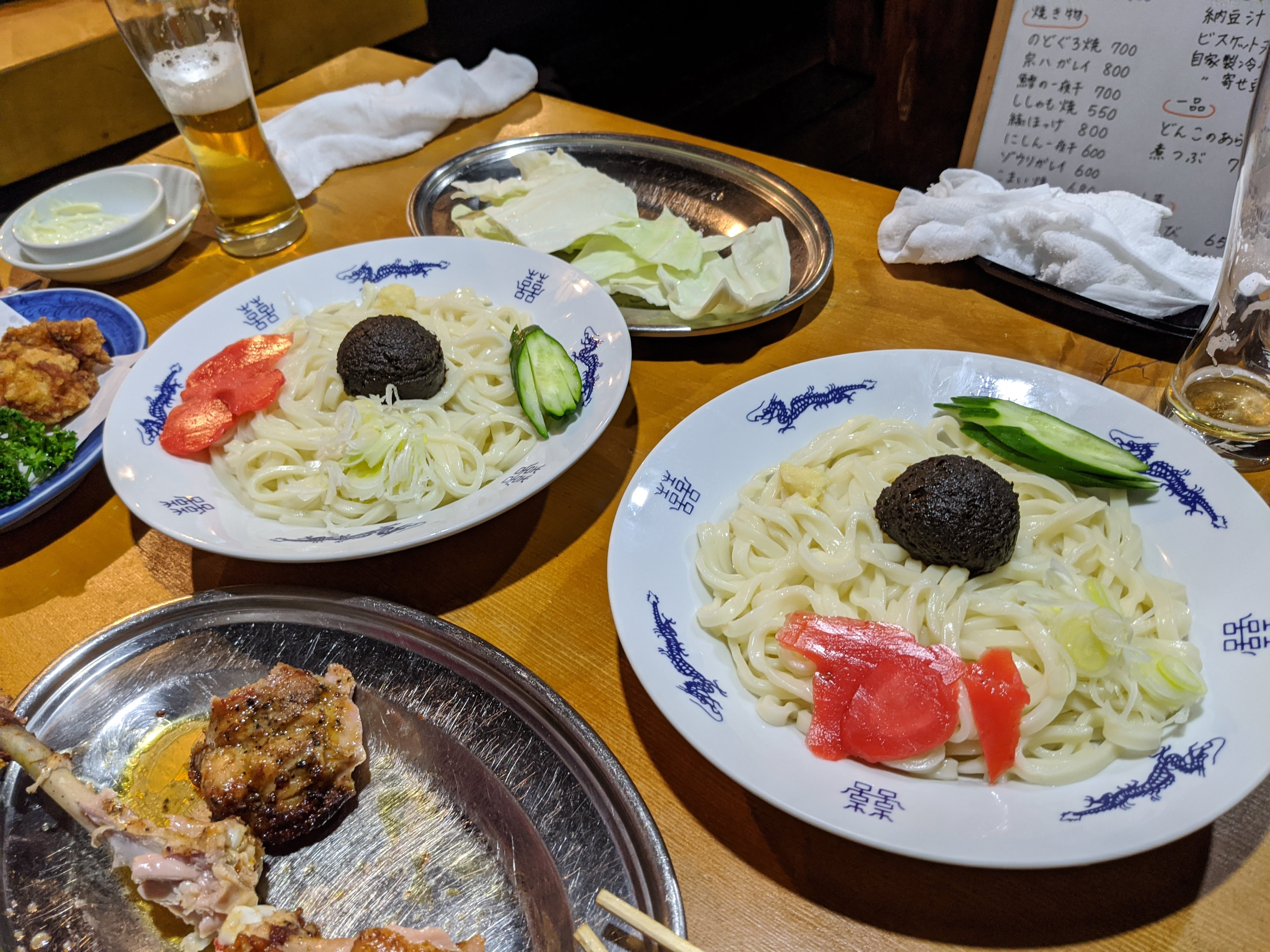
Before mixing

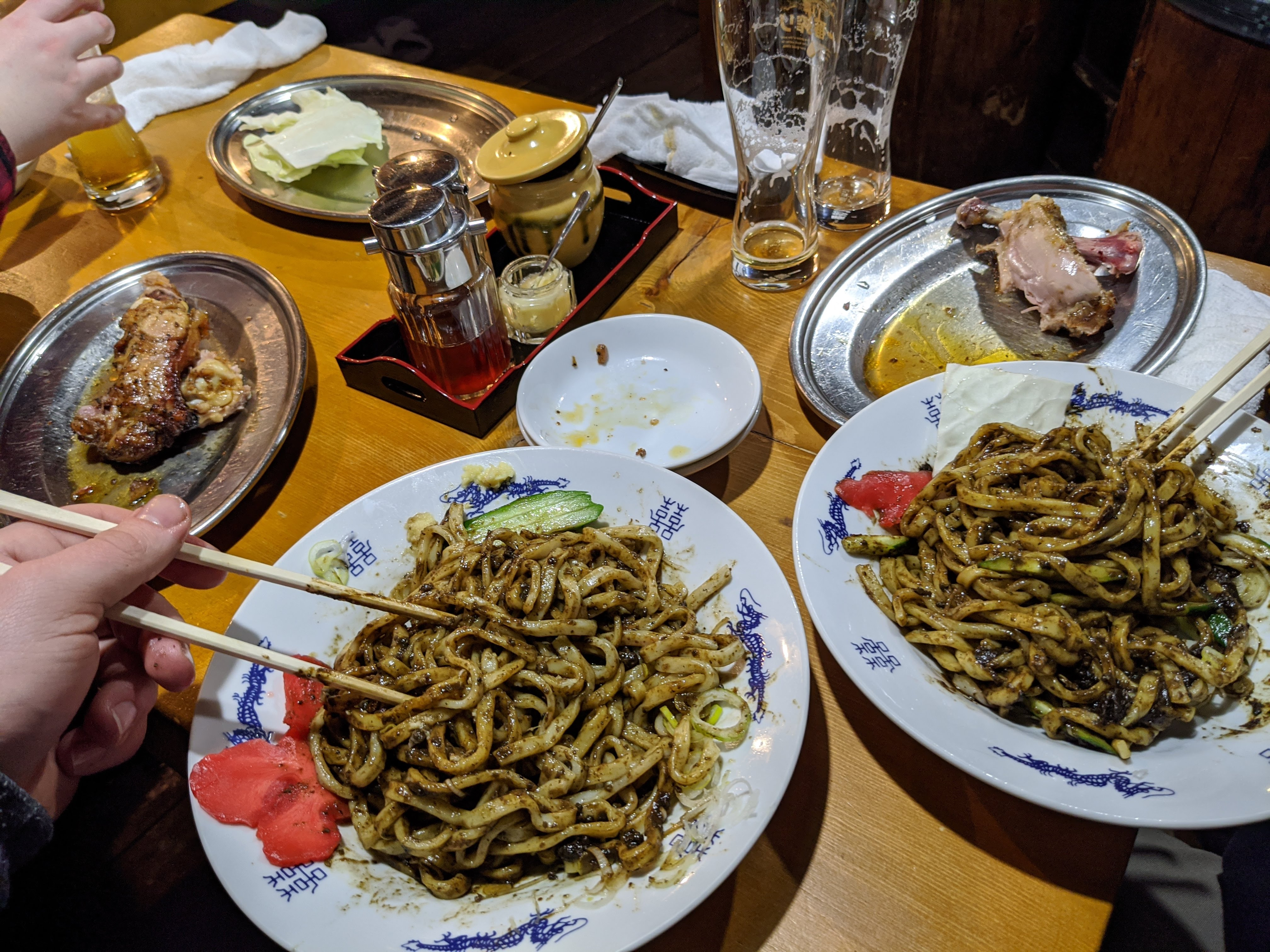
After mixing

== Chitantan ==
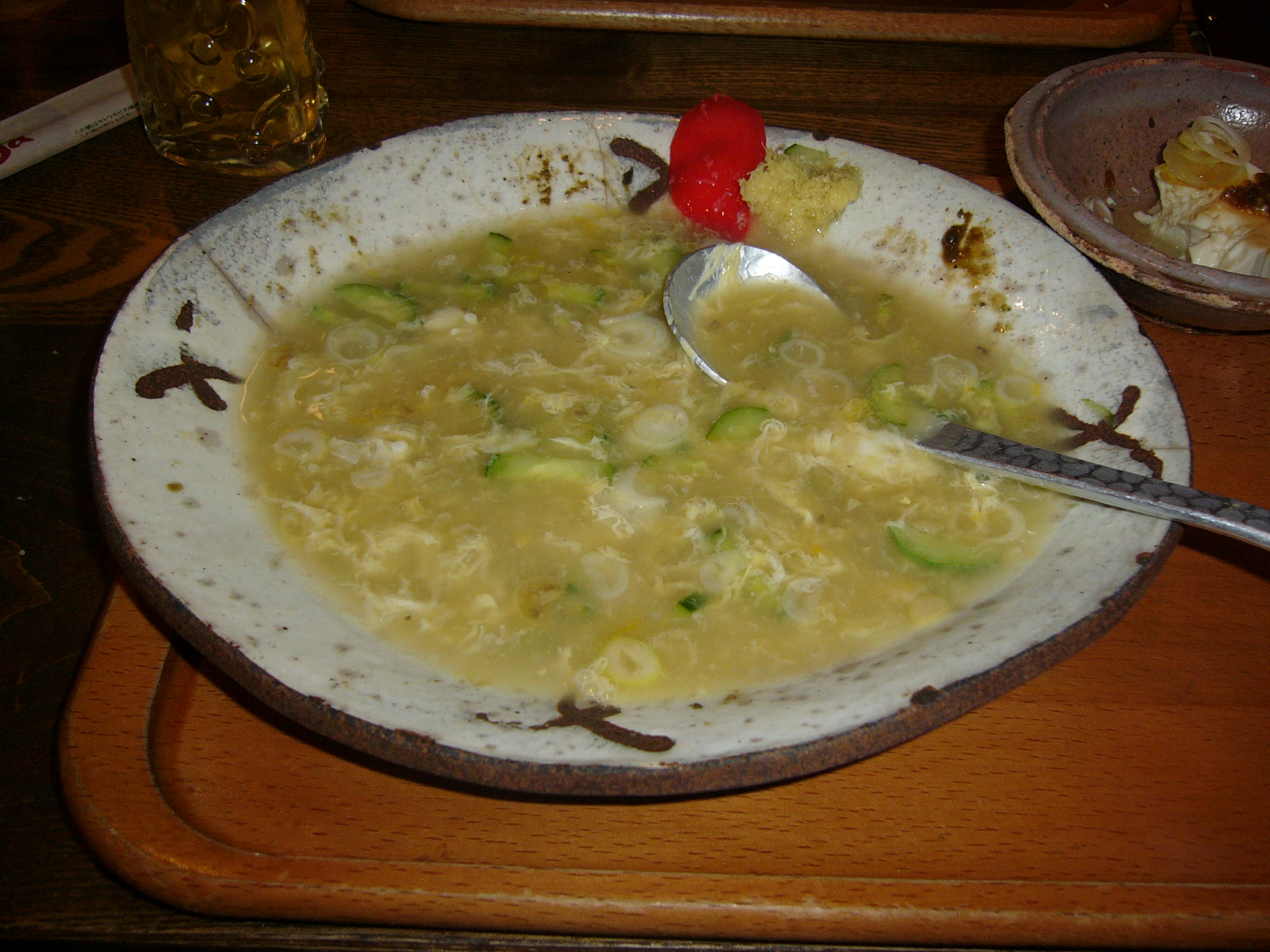
Chi-tan-tan

Near the completion of the dish, the eater may decide to turn it into chitantan (Japanese: チータンタン). With the remaining sauce and a few noodles, a raw egg is cracked into the bowl. Boiling water is added to cook the egg and mix with the remaining sauce. Additional meat miso or condiments can be added to taste.

The term 'chitantan' comes from the Chinese: 雞蛋湯; pinyin: jīdàntāng; lit. 'chicken egg soup', but in Japanese: 鶏蛋湯; rōmaji: Chītantan the pronunciation changes to meet Japanese phonology, but the kanji is not used and is instead written in katakana for foreign imported words. For more information see Sino-Japanese vocabulary.

== Zhajiangmian ==
Zhajiangmian (traditional Chinese: 炸醬麵; simplified Chinese: 炸酱面; pinyin: zhájiàngmiàn; lit. 'fried sauce noodles') is the inspiration for Morioka jajamen, but has many differences. While Morioka jajamen is a very uniform dish, zhajiangmian has many varieties. The type of noodles can be varied depending on region. The main sauce differs from the Japanese miso base and instead uses sweet bean sauce.

Korea also has a variant of zhajiangmian called jajangmyeon (자장면).
