= Wanko soba =

Soba noodle style from Iwate, Japan

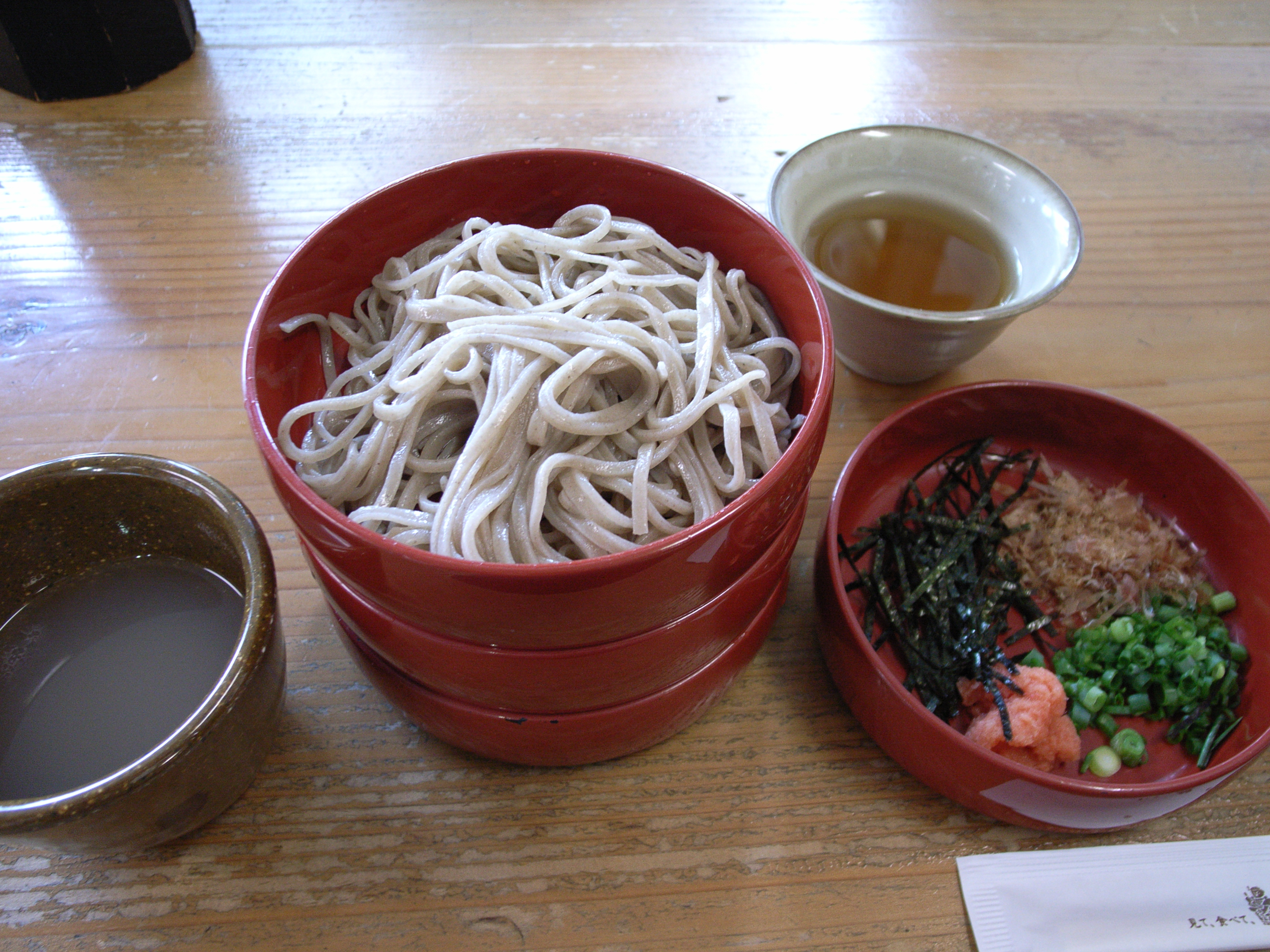
- Type: Japanese noodles
- Place of origin: Japan
- Region or state: Iwate Prefecture
- Main ingredients: Noodles (soba)

Wanko soba (わんこそば) is a style of Japanese soba noodles originating from Iwate Prefecture in Japan, particularly Morioka and Hanamaki. It consists of a small serving of soba noodles in small bowls. In this soba experience, customers quickly eat their soba noodles and get their bowl immediately refilled in repetition.

== History and origins ==
The name wanko comes from the regional dialect of the Iwate Prefecture from which it comes, meaning "bowl", but more specifically, a small, wooden Japanese soup bowl. There are many theories about the origin of the dish itself however.

- One such origin is of a landowner who was having a festival on his land. There was a crowd of over a hundred villagers and guests who customarily ate soba at festivals. However, there were so many people to feed but the pots in which the soba were to be made were very small. The soba noodles were spread around in reduced quantities so that there would be enough for everyone.
- Nanbu Toshinao, a territorial lord of the Nanbu area, came and stopped at a house in Hanamaki, asking for a meal. His retainers served him a local variety of soba in a small soup bowl. Thinking they served Nanbu something too rustic and without much flavor, they were afraid of his reaction. But Nanbu thought it was delicious, and ordered more servings. This is said to have established the tradition of hosts continuing to serve small bowls until their guest was satisfied.

There are many stories of how the dish came to be, but these two are the most common. However, as the term wanko did not come about until after World War II, some repudiate the stories.

In December 1957, the Hanamaki-shi Cultural Centre was the site of the first annual contest of who could eat the most bowls of wanko soba. The event continues to this day, featuring noodle fans from many countries.

Wanko soba is one of the three great noodles of Morioka, along with Morioka reimen and Morioka jajamen.

== Gallery ==
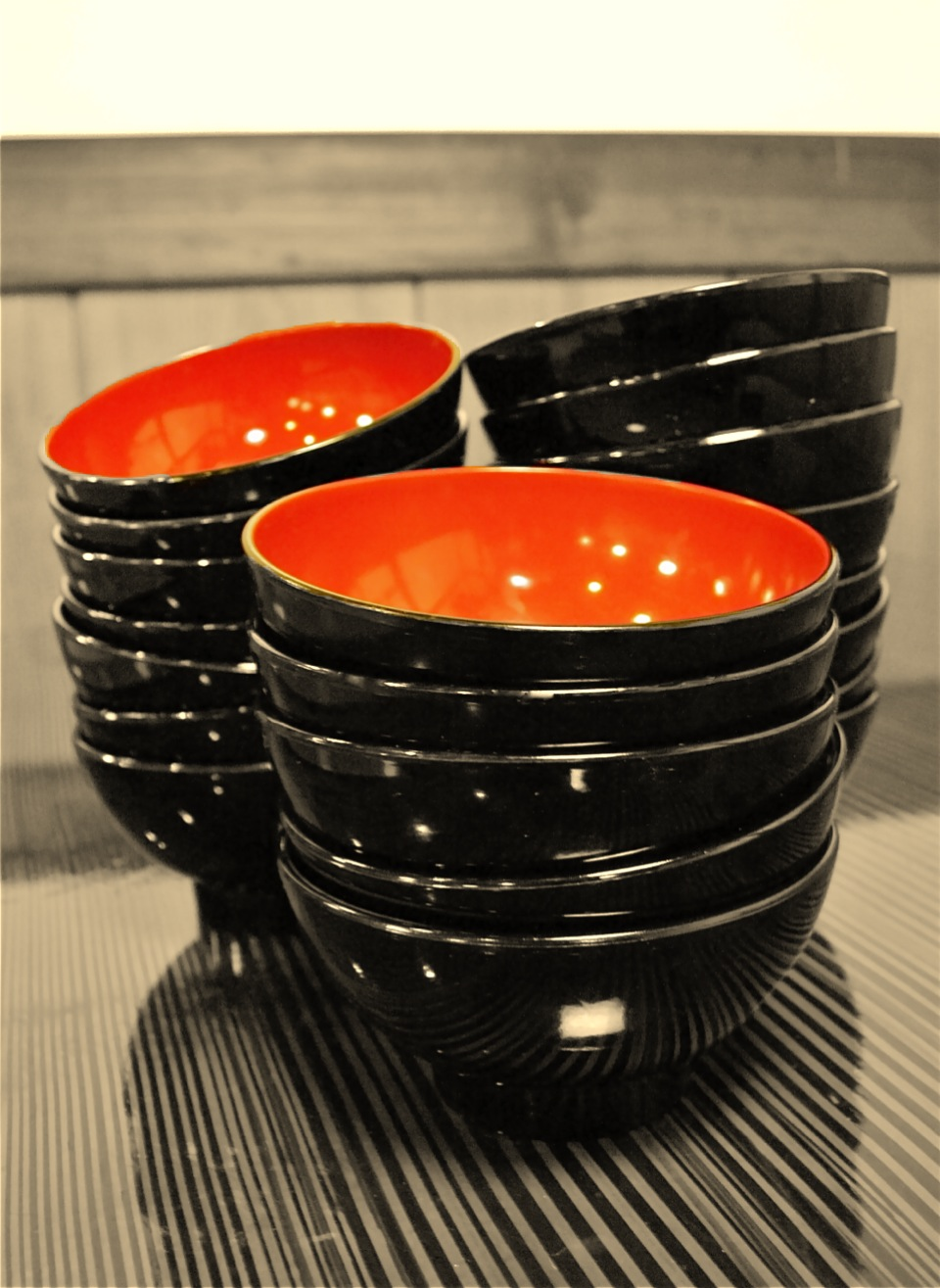

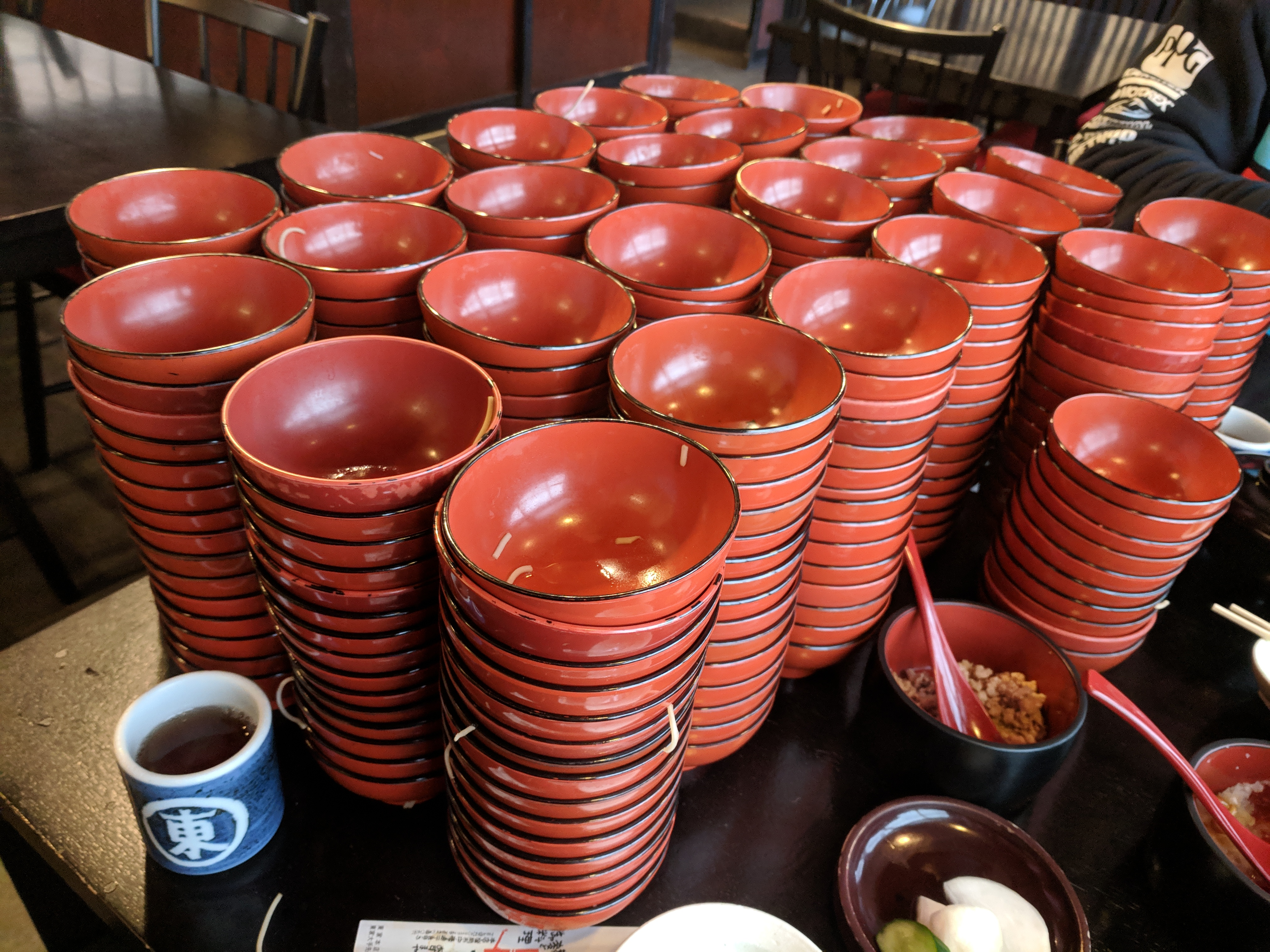
