= Hōon-ji (Morioka) =

Sōtō Zen Buddhist temple in Iwate, Japan

- 報恩寺
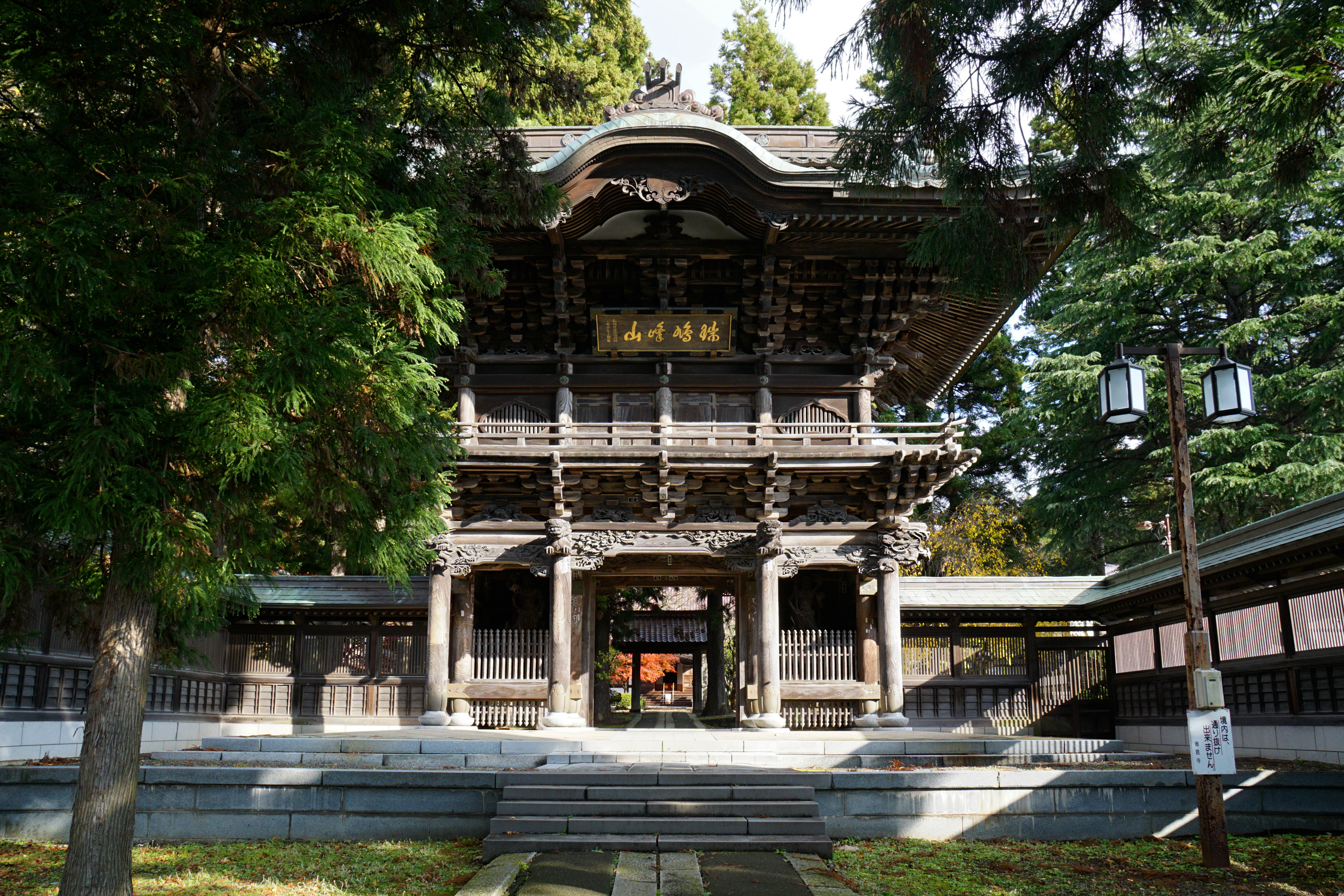
- Hōon-ji Sanmon

- Location within Iwate Prefecture Location within Japan

Religion
- Affiliation: Buddhist
- Deity: Shaka Nyōrai
- Rite: Sōtō

Location
- Location: 31-5 Nasukawachō, Takakura-aze Morioka-shi, Iwate-ken
- Interactive map of Hōon-ji
- Coordinates: 39°42′43.95″N 141°9′22.31″E

Architecture
- Founder: Nambu Moriyuki
- Completed: 1394

Hōon-ji (報恩寺) is a Sōtō Zen Buddhist temple located in the city of Morioka, Iwate Prefecture, Japan. Its main image is a statue of Shaka Nyōrai, although the temple is more famous for its statues of the 500 Rakan.

The temple was built at the seat of the Nanbu clan in Sannohe by the 13th chieftain of the clan, Nambu Moriyuki, in 1394. In 1601, the Nanbu clan was ordered to relocate its seat south to Morioka Castle by the Tokugawa shogunate, and the 27th chieftain (and first daimyō of Morioka Domain), Nanbu Toshinao relocated the temple at that time. During the Edo period, the temple was a seminary and was the head temple of a network of 280 temples throughout the Nanbu domains. In 1869, the karō of Morioka Domain, Narayama Sado, committed seppuku within the Hondō of the temple at the time of the collapse of the Ōuetsu Reppan Dōmei during the Boshin War of the Meiji restoration.

A notable feature of the temple is the Rakan-dō, built in 1735 and rebuilt in 1858. Its central statue Rushana butsu is reported to be made by Kōbō-daishi. Within the Rakan-dō are statues of the 500 Rakan, which were made in Kyoto and later brought to Morioka. Included are representations of Kublai Khan and Marco Polo.

== Gallery ==
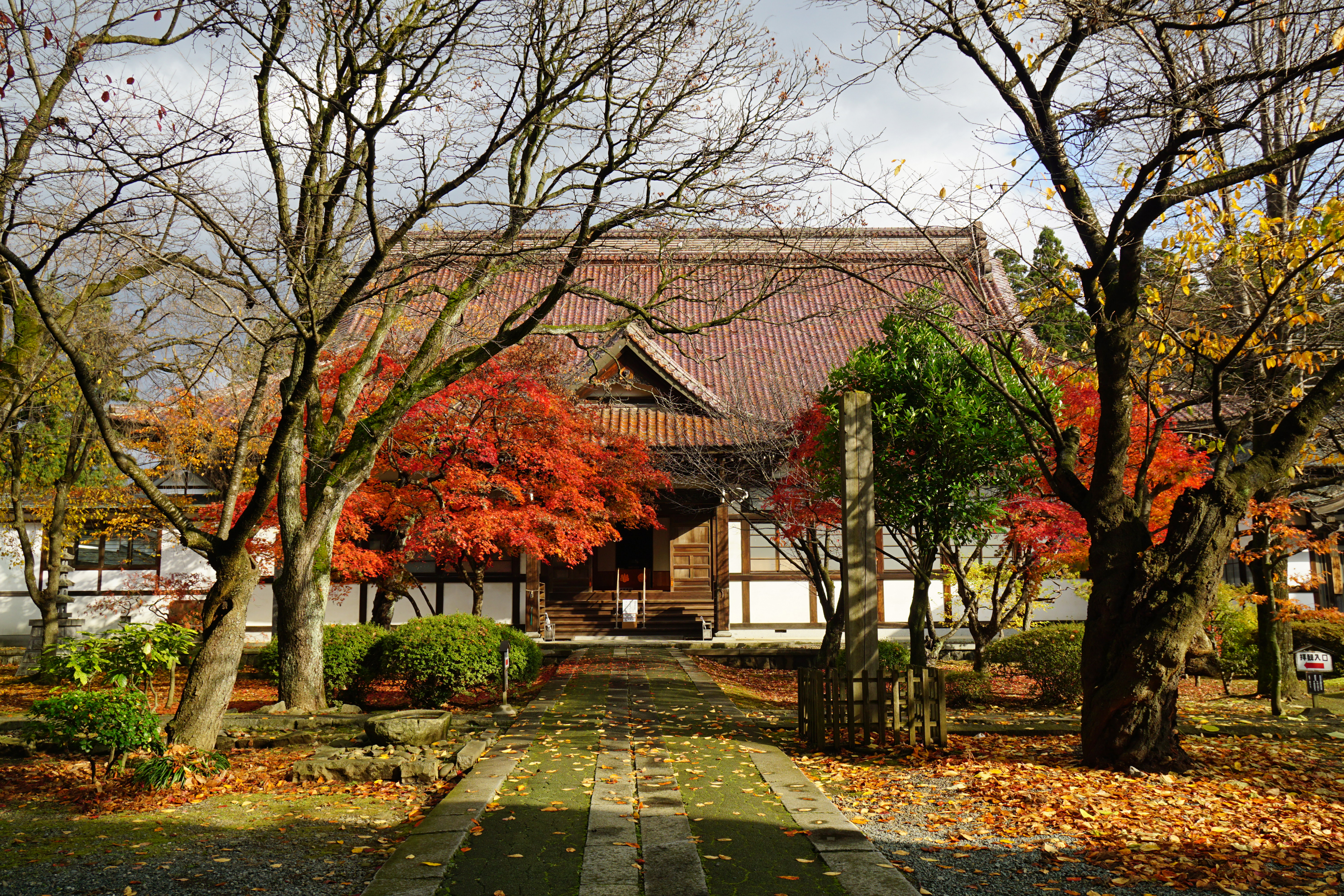
Hondō

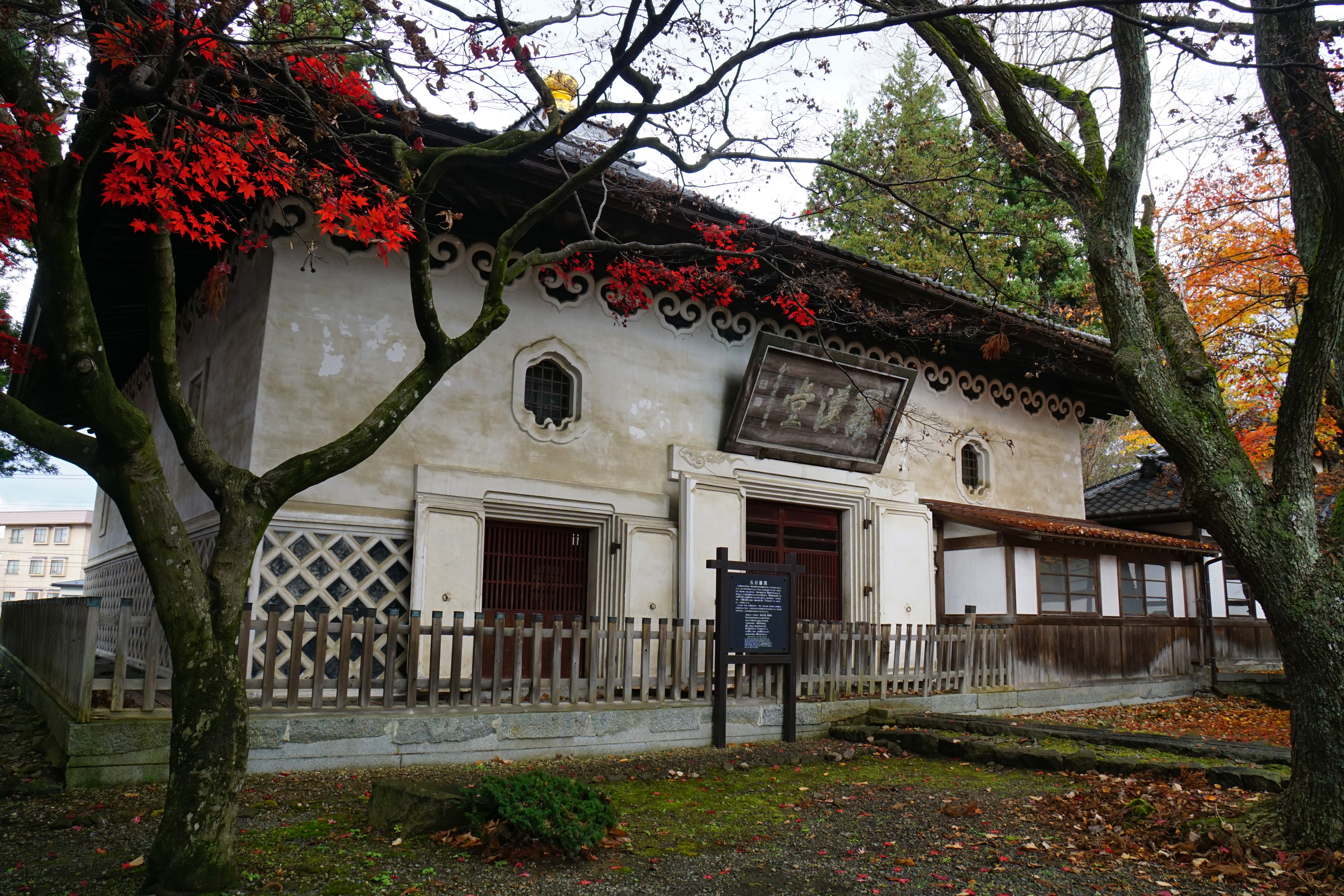
Rakan-dō

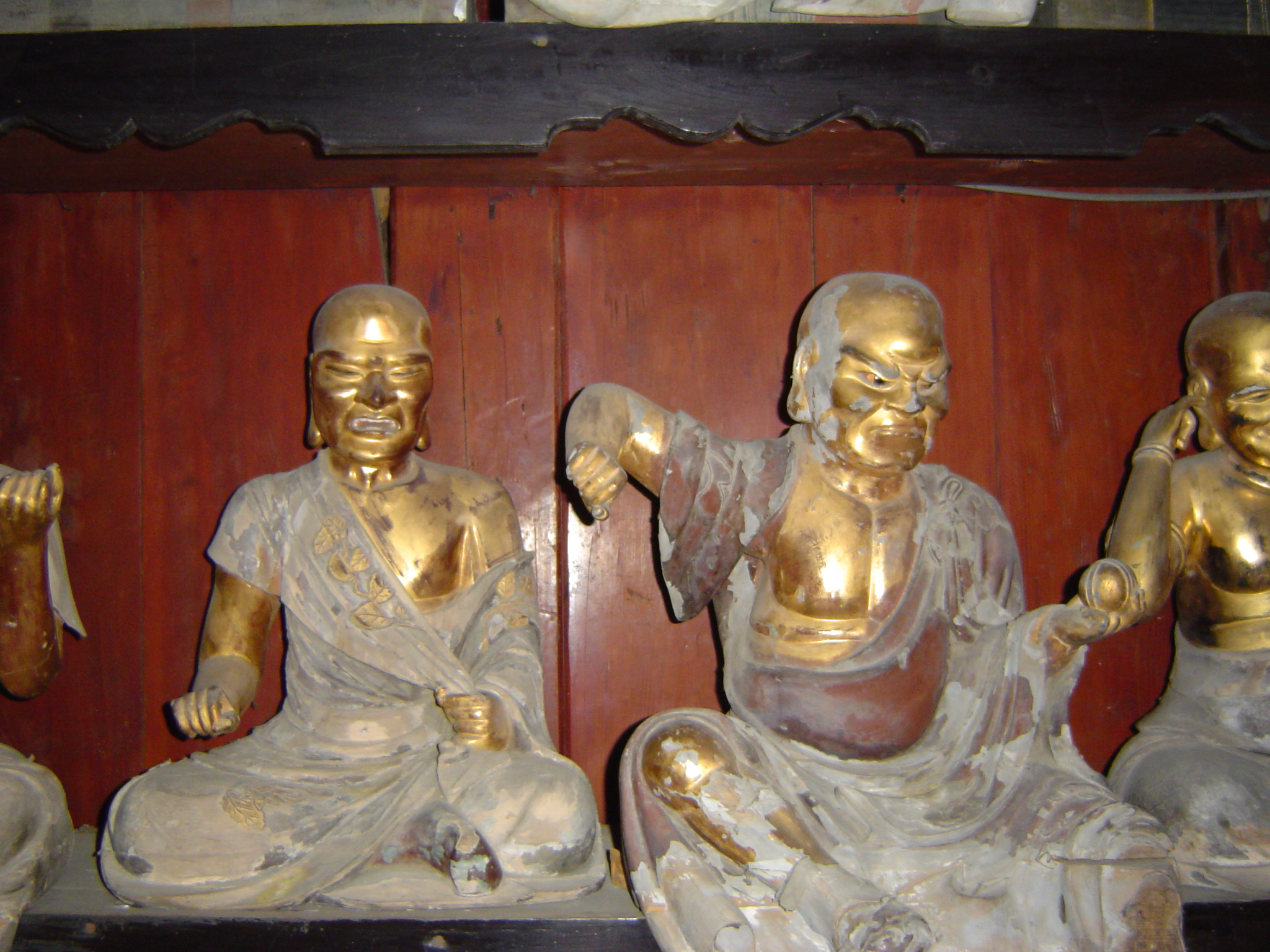
500 Rakan

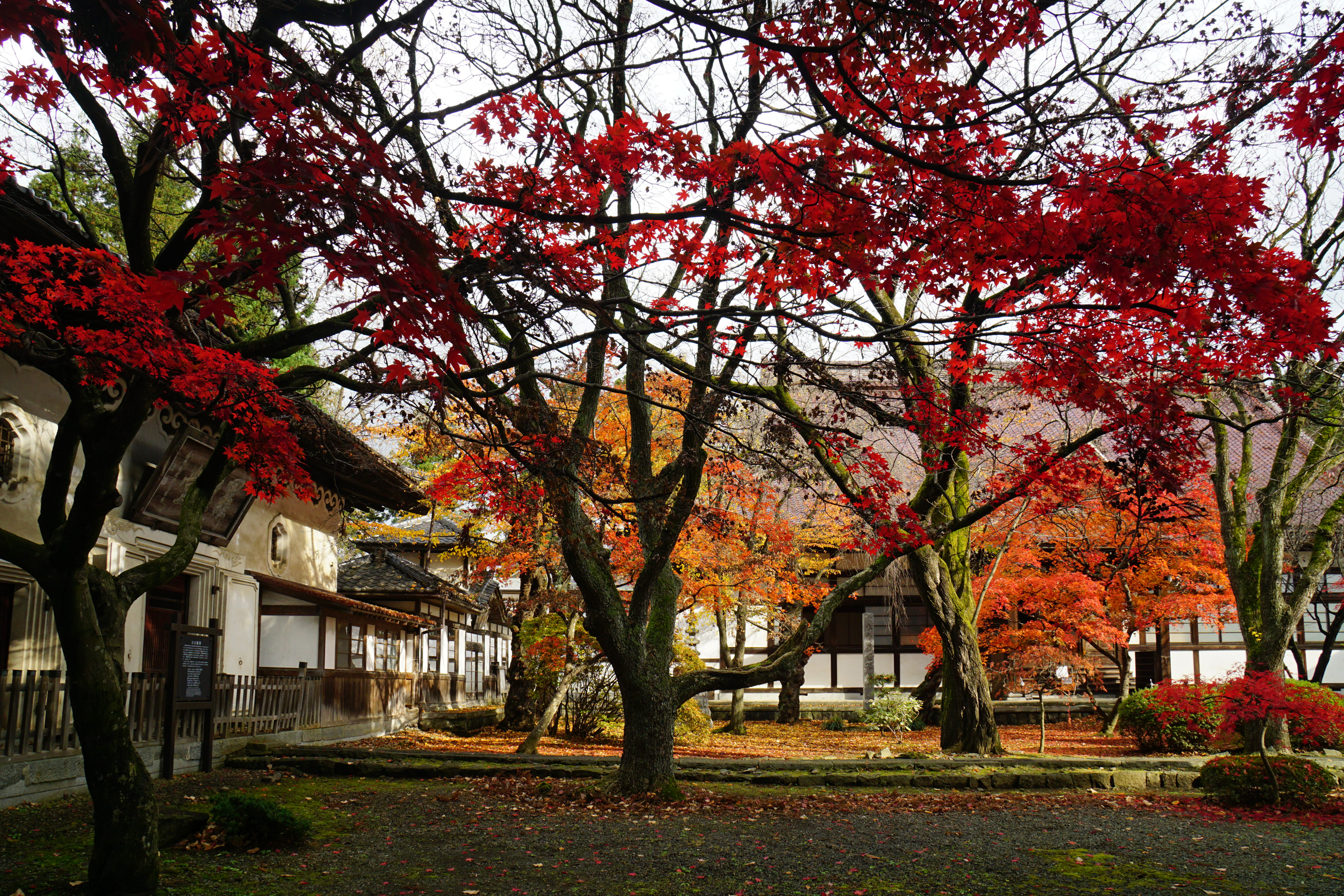
Precinct
