= Cherry Tree, Indiana =

- Neighborhood of Carmel, Indiana
- Interactive map of Cherry Tree, Indiana
- Coordinates: 39°52′00″N 86°8′30″W
- Country: United States
- State: Indiana
- County: Hamilton
- City: Carmel

Area
  - Total: 1.60 sq mi (4.1 km^{2})
- Elevation: 732 ft (223 m)

Population
  - Total: 1,700
- Time zone: UTC-5 (Eastern (EST))
  - Summer (DST): UTC-4 (EDT)
- Zip code: 46033

Cherry Tree, Indiana is a neighborhood of Carmel, Indiana. The area is centered on the intersection of Gray Road and Smokey Row Road in Hamilton County. Cherry Tree is known for large homes with some of be best, extensive walking and biking trails in Indianapolis Metropolitan Area.
