= The Cherrytree Sessions (disambiguation) =

The Cherrytree Sessions may refer to:

- The Cherrytree Sessions, an EP by Lady Gaga, 2009
- The Cherrytree Sessions (Robyn EP), 2009
- The Cherrytree Sessions, an EP by Keane, 2009
- The Cherrytree Sessions, an EP by Matthew Koma, 2013
