= Rock-Breaking Cherry Tree =

Cherry tree in Morioka, Japan

- Interactive map of Rock-Breaking Cherry Tree
- Native name: 石割桜 (Japanese)
- Species: Edo-higan cherry (Prunus itosakura)
- Location: Morioka, Iwate Prefecture, Japan
- Coordinates: 39.7036°N 141.1539°E
- Custodian: Morioka District Court

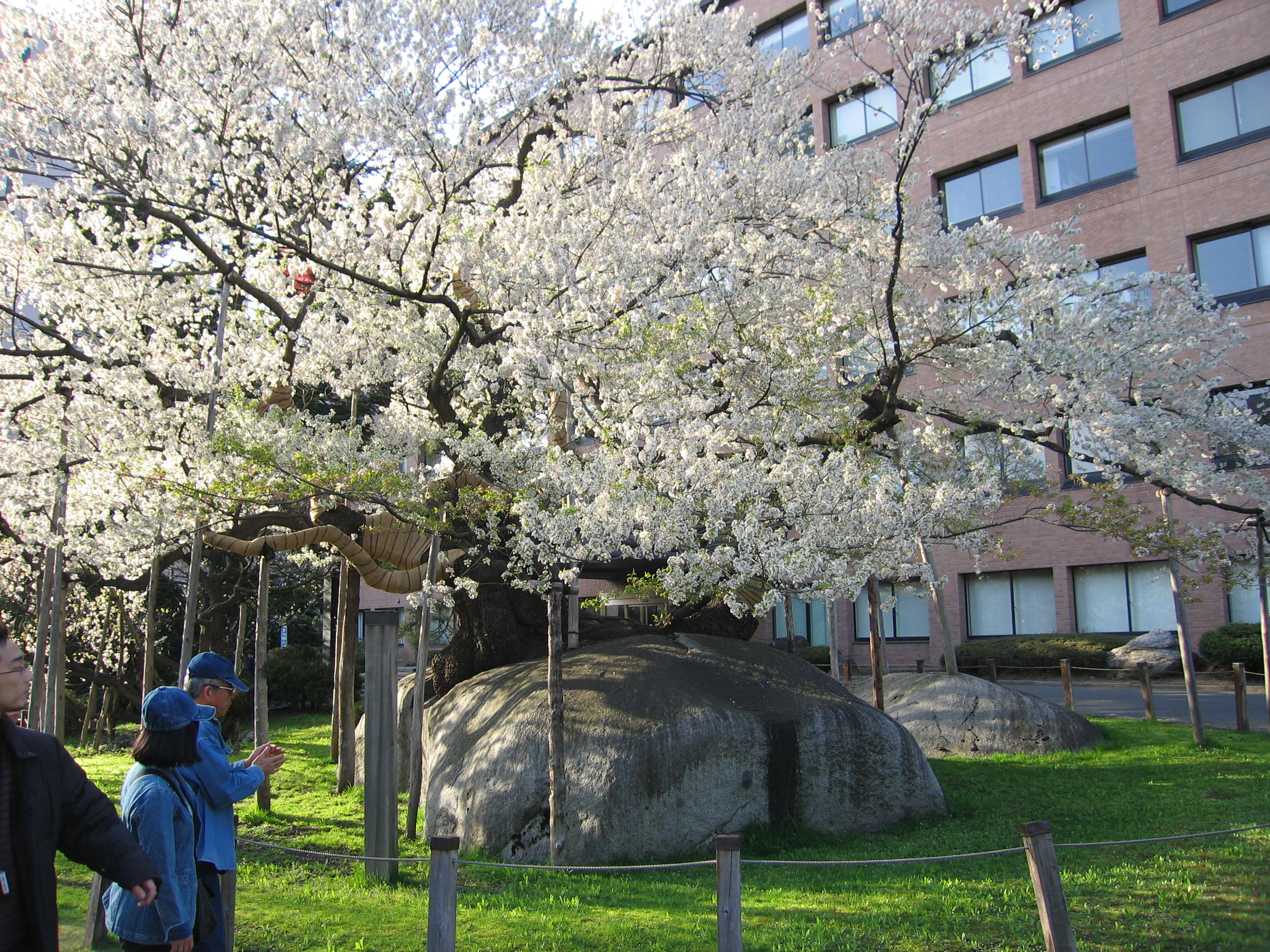
Rock-Breaking Cherry Tree

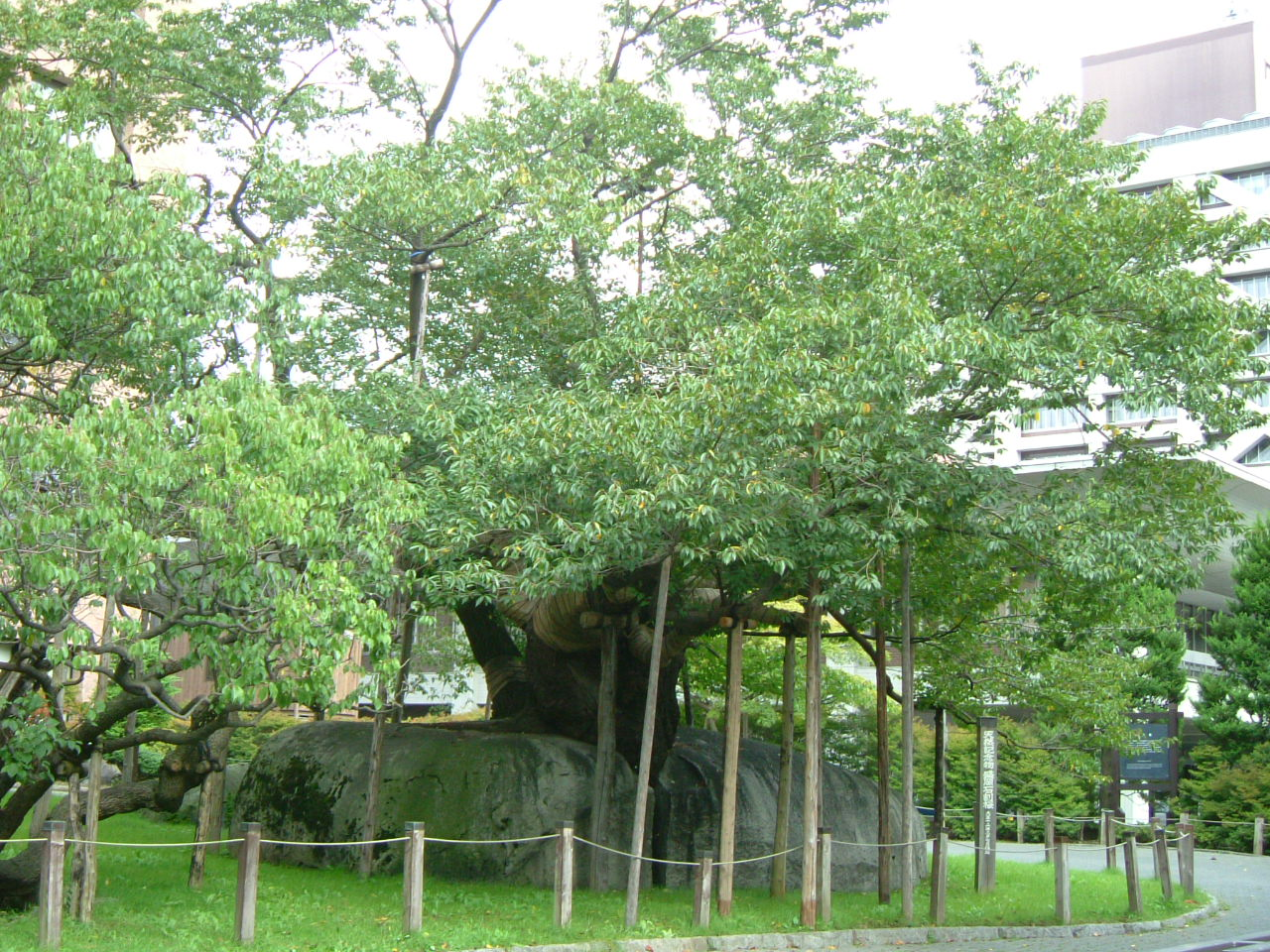
The ancient Rock-Splitting Cherry Tree in 2005

The Rock-Breaking (or Rock-Splitting) Cherry Tree (石割桜, Ishiwarizakura) is an approximately 400-year-old cherry tree growing out of a crack in a granite boulder. It is located in front of the district courthouse in Morioka, the capital of Iwate Prefecture in the Tōhoku region of northern Japan.

The tree measures 4.3 meters around the base, and is approximately 10 meters in height. It was proclaimed a Natural Treasure of Japan in 1923.

== See also ==
- Hanami
