= Morioka =

Morioka 盛岡市
- Prefecture capital and Core city
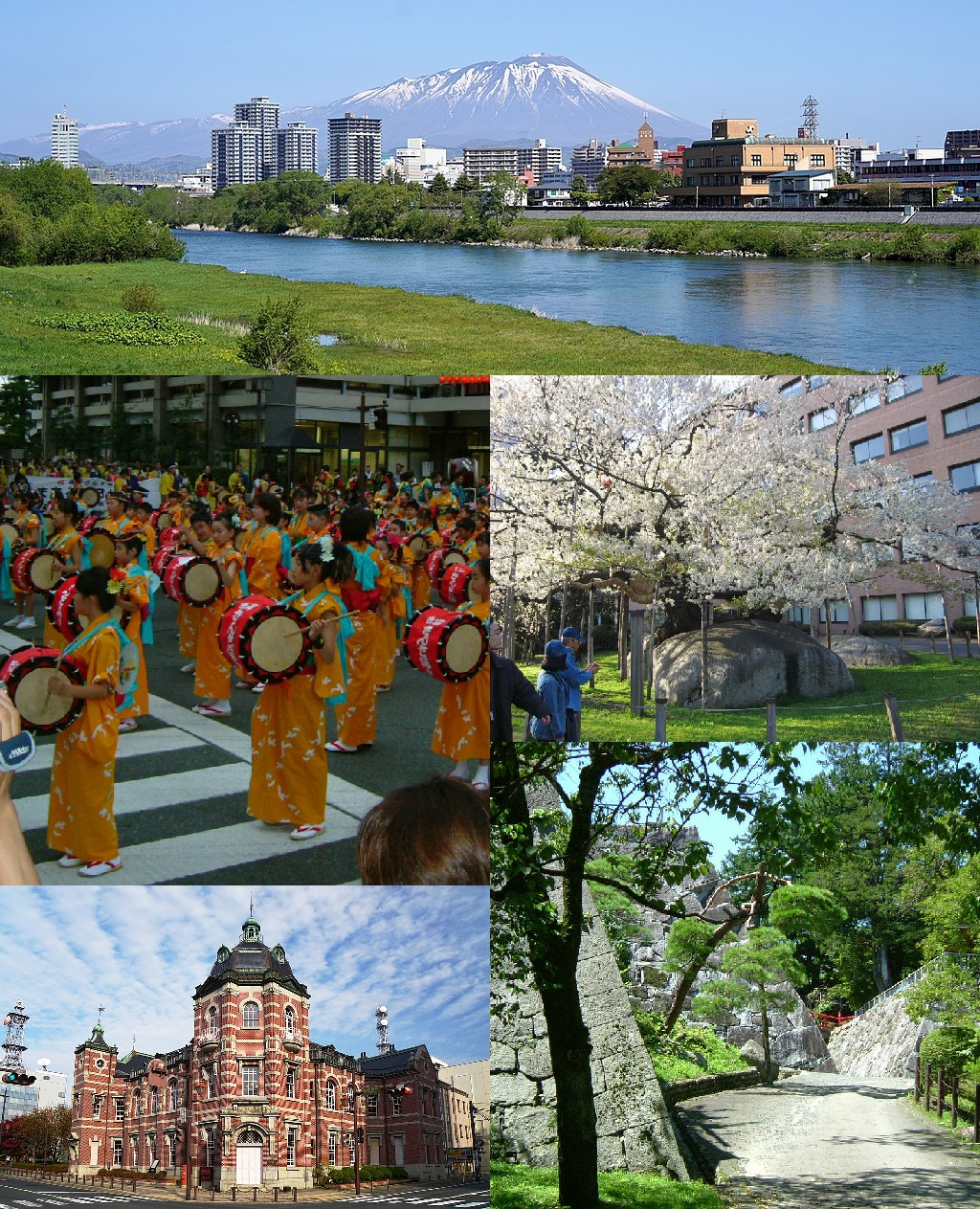
- Morioka City Montage

- Flag Seal
- Map of Iwate Prefecture with Morioka highlighted in pink

- Coordinates: 39°42′7.5″N 141°09′16.2″E
- Country: Japan
- Region: Tōhoku
- Prefecture: Iwate
- First official recorded: 4th century AD
- City Settled: April 1, 1889

Government
  - Mayor: Shigeru Uchidate (from September 2023)

Area
  - Prefecture capital and Core city: 886.47 km^{2} (342.27 sq mi)

Population (2025)
  - Prefecture capital and Core city: 278,636
  - Rank: 80th in Japan; 36th (Agglomeration)
  - Density: 314.32/km^{2} (814.09/sq mi)
  - Urban: 234,000
  - Metro: 291,000
- Time zone: UTC+9 (Japan Standard Time)
- Symbols
  - Tree: Katsura
  - Flower: Rabbit-ear iris
  - Bird: Wagtail
- Phone number: 019-651-4111
- Address: 12-2 Uchimaru, Morioka-shi, Iwate-ken 020-8530
- Website: Official website

Morioka (盛岡市, Morioka-shi; Japanese pronunciation: [mò̞.ɾʲí.ò̞.kä̀, -ó̞.kä́.ɕì]) is the capital city of Iwate Prefecture located in the Tōhoku region of northern Japan. As of 1 August 2023, the city had an estimated population of 283,981 in 132,719 households, and a population density of 320 per square kilometre (830/sq mi). The total area of the city is 886.47 square kilometres (342.27 sq mi).

== Geography ==
Morioka is located in the Kitakami Basin in central Iwate Prefecture, at the confluence of three rivers, the Kitakami, the Shizukuishi and the Nakatsu. The Kitakami River is the second largest river on the Pacific side of Japan (after the Tone River) and the longest in the Tōhoku region. It runs through the city from north to south and has a number of dams within the city boundaries, including the Shijūshida Dam and Gandō Dam. An active volcano, Mount Iwate, dominates the view to the northwest of the city. Mount Himekami is to the north and Mount Hayachine can sometimes be seen to the southeast.

=== Surrounding municipalities ===
Iwate Prefecture

- Hachimantai
- Hanamaki
- Iwaizumi
- Kuzumaki
- Miyako
- Shiwa
- Shizukuishi
- Takizawa
- Yahaba

== Demographics ==
Per Japanese census data, the population of Morioka peaked at around the year 2000 and has slightly declined since.

Historical population
Year	Pop.	±%
1960	155,575	—
1970	226,868	+45.8%
1980	272,814	+20.3%
1990	292,632	+7.3%
2000	302,857	+3.5%
2010	298,572	−1.4%
2020	289,731	−3.0%

== Climate ==
Morioka has a cold, humid continental climate (Köppen Dfa) characterized by warm, short summers and long, cold winters with heavy snowfall. The average annual temperature in Morioka is 10.2 °C (50.4 °F). The average annual rainfall is 1,314 millimetres (51.7 in) with July as the wettest month. The temperatures are at their highest on average in August, at around 23.7 °C (74.7 °F), and lowest on average in January, at around −2.4 °C (27.7 °F).

Climate data for Morioka (elevation 155.2 m, 1991–2020 normals, extremes 1923–present)
Month	Jan	Feb	Mar	Apr	May	Jun	Jul	Aug	Sep	Oct	Nov	Dec	Year
Record high °C (°F)	13.2 (55.8)	17.1 (62.8)	21.5 (70.7)	29.0 (84.2)	33.6 (92.5)	33.7 (92.7)	37.2 (99.0)	37.2 (99.0)	34.7 (94.5)	29.2 (84.6)	22.6 (72.7)	17.9 (64.2)	37.2 (99.0)
Mean maximum °C (°F)	6.7 (44.1)	9.5 (49.1)	15.9 (60.6)	23.5 (74.3)	28.1 (82.6)	30.3 (86.5)	32.7 (90.9)	34.1 (93.4)	30.2 (86.4)	24.1 (75.4)	17.7 (63.9)	10.9 (51.6)	34.4 (93.9)
Mean daily maximum °C (°F)	2.0 (35.6)	3.2 (37.8)	7.5 (45.5)	14.4 (57.9)	20.3 (68.5)	24.1 (75.4)	27.1 (80.8)	28.4 (83.1)	24.3 (75.7)	17.9 (64.2)	10.9 (51.6)	4.5 (40.1)	15.4 (59.7)
Daily mean °C (°F)	−1.6 (29.1)	−0.9 (30.4)	2.6 (36.7)	8.7 (47.7)	14.5 (58.1)	18.8 (65.8)	22.4 (72.3)	23.5 (74.3)	19.3 (66.7)	12.6 (54.7)	6.2 (43.2)	0.8 (33.4)	10.6 (51.1)
Mean daily minimum °C (°F)	−5.2 (22.6)	−4.8 (23.4)	−1.8 (28.8)	3.2 (37.8)	9.1 (48.4)	14.2 (57.6)	18.8 (65.8)	19.8 (67.6)	15.2 (59.4)	7.9 (46.2)	1.8 (35.2)	−2.5 (27.5)	6.3 (43.3)
Mean minimum °C (°F)	−10.6 (12.9)	−10.3 (13.5)	−7.5 (18.5)	−2.3 (27.9)	2.6 (36.7)	8.5 (47.3)	13.8 (56.8)	13.9 (57.0)	7.8 (46.0)	1.2 (34.2)	−3.7 (25.3)	−7.7 (18.1)	−11.4 (11.5)
Record low °C (°F)	−20.6 (−5.1)	−17.7 (0.1)	−17.1 (1.2)	−7.8 (18.0)	−2.0 (28.4)	1.3 (34.3)	4.3 (39.7)	7.4 (45.3)	2.5 (36.5)	−3.4 (25.9)	−8.6 (16.5)	−17.7 (0.1)	−20.6 (−5.1)
Average precipitation mm (inches)	49.4 (1.94)	48.0 (1.89)	82.1 (3.23)	85.4 (3.36)	106.5 (4.19)	109.4 (4.31)	197.5 (7.78)	185.4 (7.30)	151.7 (5.97)	108.7 (4.28)	85.6 (3.37)	70.2 (2.76)	1,279.9 (50.39)
Average snowfall cm (inches)	63 (25)	55 (22)	39 (15)	3 (1.2)	0 (0)	0 (0)	0 (0)	0 (0)	0 (0)	0 (0)	6 (2.4)	44 (17)	209 (82)
Average precipitation days (≥ 0.5 mm)	11.9	10.5	13.2	12.2	12.3	10.5	14.6	12.5	12.5	12.4	13.8	12.6	149.0
Average snowy days	27.3	23.3	20.1	6.9	0.1	0.0	0.0	0.0	0.0	0.2	8.7	24.4	111.0
Average relative humidity (%)	73	71	67	65	68	74	80	79	80	78	76	75	74
Mean monthly sunshine hours	115.6	124.8	157.8	171.4	188.0	161.3	130.5	145.3	128.8	141.3	117.7	103.7	1,686.3
Source: Japan Meteorological Agency (1991–2020 normals, extremes 1923–present)

Climate data for Kōma, Morioka (elevation 205 m, 1991–2020 normals, extremes 1976–present)
Month	Jan	Feb	Mar	Apr	May	Jun	Jul	Aug	Sep	Oct	Nov	Dec	Year
Record high °C (°F)	12.9 (55.2)	15.8 (60.4)	21.3 (70.3)	29.6 (85.3)	33.1 (91.6)	32.9 (91.2)	36.4 (97.5)	36.6 (97.9)	34.0 (93.2)	28.5 (83.3)	22.8 (73.0)	15.7 (60.3)	36.6 (97.9)
Mean daily maximum °C (°F)	1.5 (34.7)	2.5 (36.5)	6.8 (44.2)	14.1 (57.4)	20.0 (68.0)	23.6 (74.5)	26.6 (79.9)	27.7 (81.9)	23.7 (74.7)	17.6 (63.7)	10.6 (51.1)	4.0 (39.2)	14.9 (58.8)
Daily mean °C (°F)	−2.6 (27.3)	−2.0 (28.4)	1.9 (35.4)	8.1 (46.6)	14.2 (57.6)	18.4 (65.1)	22.0 (71.6)	22.9 (73.2)	18.5 (65.3)	11.8 (53.2)	5.5 (41.9)	0.0 (32.0)	9.9 (49.8)
Mean daily minimum °C (°F)	−7.4 (18.7)	−7.1 (19.2)	−3.0 (26.6)	2.0 (35.6)	8.4 (47.1)	13.6 (56.5)	18.2 (64.8)	19.0 (66.2)	14.1 (57.4)	6.3 (43.3)	0.5 (32.9)	−4.0 (24.8)	5.0 (41.0)
Record low °C (°F)	−21.6 (−6.9)	−21.3 (−6.3)	−16.3 (2.7)	−9.6 (14.7)	−2.3 (27.9)	1.8 (35.2)	7.9 (46.2)	7.7 (45.9)	1.5 (34.7)	−4.2 (24.4)	−9.5 (14.9)	−18.6 (−1.5)	−21.6 (−6.9)
Average precipitation mm (inches)	36.3 (1.43)	38.9 (1.53)	70.3 (2.77)	77.6 (3.06)	92.7 (3.65)	103.5 (4.07)	180.3 (7.10)	167.5 (6.59)	152.8 (6.02)	107.5 (4.23)	85.4 (3.36)	65.7 (2.59)	1,178.5 (46.40)
Average precipitation days (≥ 1.0 mm)	8.8	8.5	9.9	10.0	10.5	9.3	12.4	11.9	11.7	10.5	12.2	10.6	126.4
Mean monthly sunshine hours	91.3	106.0	144.1	166.5	189.9	164.8	137.8	158.6	135.4	132.3	110.5	89.0	1,626.2
Source: Japan Meteorological Agency (1991–2020 normals, extremes 1976–present)

Climate data for Yabukawa, Morioka (elevation 680 m, 1991–2020 normals, extremes 1976–present)
Month	Jan	Feb	Mar	Apr	May	Jun	Jul	Aug	Sep	Oct	Nov	Dec	Year
Record high °C (°F)	7.7 (45.9)	12.6 (54.7)	16.4 (61.5)	24.8 (76.6)	30.3 (86.5)	29.4 (84.9)	31.5 (88.7)	31.8 (89.2)	29.4 (84.9)	25.7 (78.3)	20.5 (68.9)	13.5 (56.3)	31.8 (89.2)
Mean daily maximum °C (°F)	−2.2 (28.0)	−1.3 (29.7)	2.5 (36.5)	10.0 (50.0)	16.7 (62.1)	20.3 (68.5)	23.3 (73.9)	24.4 (75.9)	20.3 (68.5)	14.2 (57.6)	7.3 (45.1)	0.6 (33.1)	11.3 (52.3)
Daily mean °C (°F)	−6.6 (20.1)	−5.9 (21.4)	−2.1 (28.2)	4.2 (39.6)	10.4 (50.7)	14.8 (58.6)	18.9 (66.0)	19.7 (67.5)	15.3 (59.5)	8.5 (47.3)	2.3 (36.1)	−3.4 (25.9)	6.4 (43.5)
Mean daily minimum °C (°F)	−13.2 (8.2)	−13.0 (8.6)	−8.3 (17.1)	−2.1 (28.2)	3.5 (38.3)	9.1 (48.4)	14.7 (58.5)	15.3 (59.5)	10.3 (50.5)	2.5 (36.5)	−3.3 (26.1)	−8.7 (16.3)	0.6 (33.1)
Record low °C (°F)	−26.6 (−15.9)	−27.6 (−17.7)	−24.8 (−12.6)	−15.5 (4.1)	−7.5 (18.5)	−2.4 (27.7)	3.1 (37.6)	3.1 (37.6)	−1.6 (29.1)	−8.1 (17.4)	−14.8 (5.4)	−24.3 (−11.7)	−27.6 (−17.7)
Average precipitation mm (inches)	54.5 (2.15)	50.5 (1.99)	83.1 (3.27)	95.2 (3.75)	116.0 (4.57)	115.0 (4.53)	210.7 (8.30)	203.3 (8.00)	160.3 (6.31)	127.2 (5.01)	108.0 (4.25)	84.8 (3.34)	1,405.1 (55.32)
Average precipitation days (≥ 1.0 mm)	12.5	12.1	13.6	12.7	12.2	11.0	14.6	13.1	12.9	12.7	14.1	12.8	153.8
Mean monthly sunshine hours	61.0	69.7	107.3	151.0	177.7	150.4	126.8	142.7	122.2	124.2	94.9	64.6	1,392.4
Source: Japan Meteorological Agency (1991–2020 normals, extremes 1976–present)

== History ==
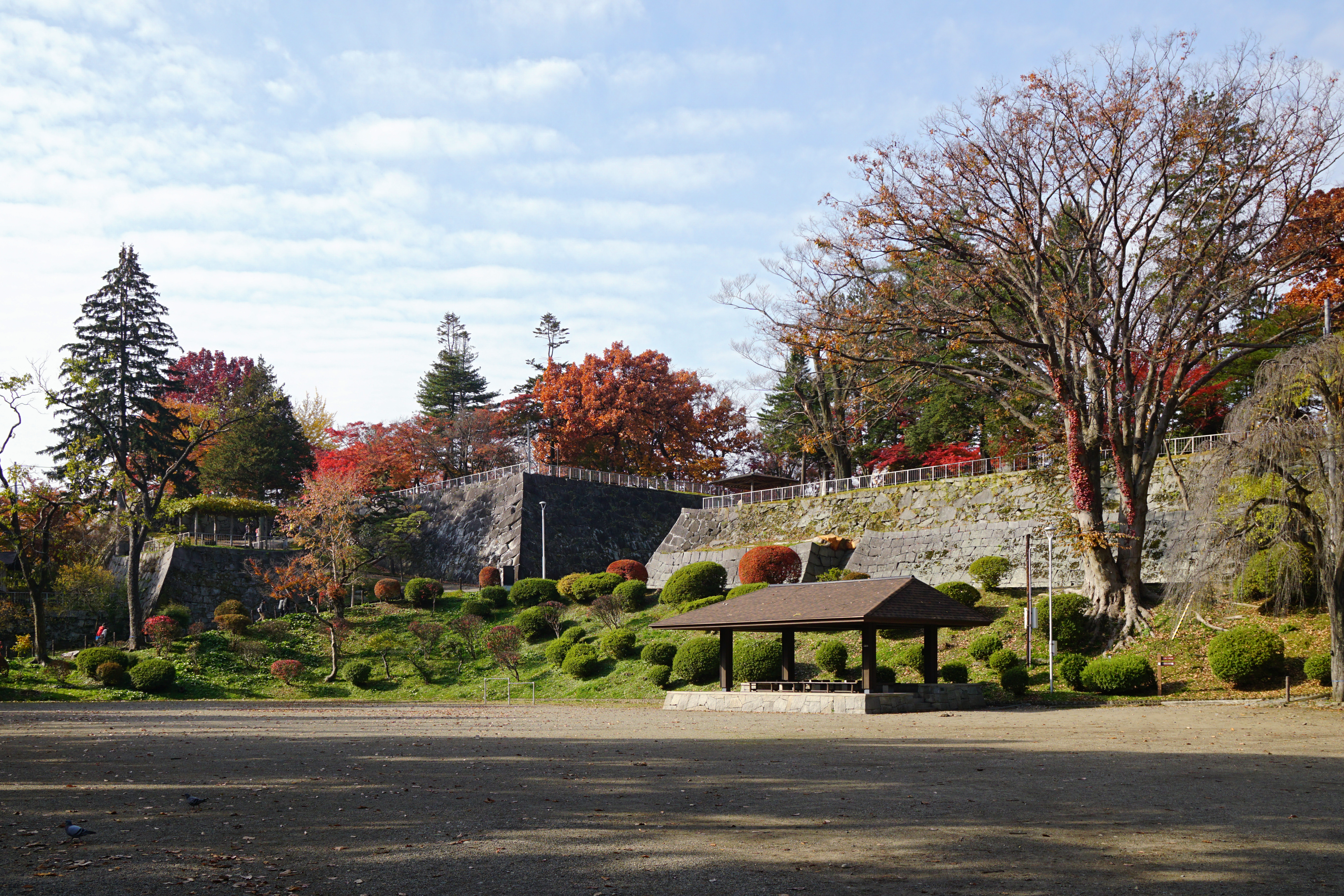
Morioka Castle

=== Paleolithic-Feudal eras ===
The area of present-day Morioka has been continuously inhabited since the Japanese Paleolithic period. Numerous Jōmon, Yayoi, and Kofun period tombs and remains have been found. The Emishi inhabited the area into the Heian period. During the Enryaku era of the Heian period, Sakanoue no Tamuramaro, was ordered north to Shiwa Castle in 803 AD, as a military center to extend the domination of the imperial dynasty over Mutsu Province. The area was later ruled by the Abe clan until their destruction during the Former Nine Years War at the hands of the Minamoto and Kiyohara clans. The Kiyohara were in turn defeated in the Gosannen War and the area came under the control of the Ōshū Fujiwara Clan based in Hiraizumi, to the south of Morioka. After the Ōshū Fujiwara were destroyed by Minamoto no Yoritomo at the start of the Kamakura period, the area was disputed by several samurai clans until the Nanbu clan, based in Sannohe to the north, expanded their territory during the Sengoku period and built Kozukata Castle in 1592.

Following the Battle of Sekigahara and the formal recognition of Morioka Domain under the Tokugawa shogunate, Kozukata Castle was renamed Morioka Castle. Its name was changed from 森岡 to 盛岡 (both read as "Morioka") During the Boshin War of the Meiji Restoration, Morioka Domain was a key member of the pro-Tokugawa Ōuetsu Reppan Dōmei.

=== Modern era ===
After the start of the Meiji period, the former Morioka Domain became Morioka Prefecture in 1870, and part of Iwate Prefecture from 1872. With the establishment of the modern municipality system on April 1, 1889, the city of Morioka was established as the capital of Iwate Prefecture. The city was connected by train to Tokyo in 1890. The city emerged from World War II with very little damage, having been subject to only two minor air raids during the war.

On January 10, 2006, the village of Tamayama was merged into Morioka. Morioka was proclaimed a core city in 2008, with increased local autonomy.

During the 2011 Tōhoku earthquake, Morioka was hit by a 6.1 earthquake, and numerous aftershocks, but with little damage other than extensive power outages.

== Government ==
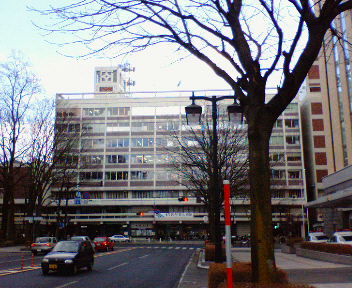
Morioka City Hall

Morioka has a mayor-council form of government with a directly elected mayor and a unicameral city legislature of 38 members. Morioka contributes ten seats to the Iwate Prefectural legislature. In terms of national politics, the town is part of Iwate 1st district of the lower house of the Diet of Japan.

== Education ==
=== Colleges and university ===
- Iwate Medical University
- Iwate University

=== High schools ===
Morioka has eight public high schools operated by the Iwate Prefectural Board of Education.

- Morioka First High School
- Morioka Second High School
- Morioka Third High School
- Morioka Fourth High School
- Morioka South High School
- Morioka Agricultural High School
- Morioka Industrial High School
- Morioka Commercial High School

There is also one public high school operated by the city government and ten private high schools

== Transportation ==
=== Railway ===
East Japan Railway Company (JR East) - Tōhoku Shinkansen

- Morioka Station

East Japan Railway Company (JR East) - Tōhoku Main Line

- Iwate-Iioka - Senbokuchō - Morioka

East Japan Railway Company (JR East) - Tazawako Line (Akita Shinkansen)

- Morioka - Maegata

East Japan Railway Company (JR East) - Yamada Line

- Morioka - Kamimorioka - Yamagishi - Kamiyonai

East Japan Railway Company (JR East) - Hanawa Line

- Morioka - Kōma

Iwate Ginga Railway Line

- Morioka – Aoyama – Kuriyagawa – Shibutami – Kōma

=== Highway ===
- Tōhoku Expressway – Morioka-Minami IC, Morioka IC
- National Route 4
- National Route 46
- National Route 106
- National Route 281
- National Route 282
- National Route 396
- National Route 455
- National Route 456

=== Air ===
The nearest airport is served by Hanamaki Airport which is located approximately 41 km (25 mi) south of Morioka.

== Local attractions ==
- The Iwate Museum of Art in Morioka displays works by three notable local artists, Tetsugoro Yorozu, Shunsuke Matsumoto and Yasutake Funakoshi, as well as holding exhibitions on national and international themes.
- Rock-Breaking Cherry Tree - designated a natural monument of Japan.
- Iwate Prefectural Museum
- Site of Morioka Castle, National Historic Site
- Shiwa Castle ruins, National Historic Site
- Bank of Iwate Red Brick Building, Important Cultural Property
- Morioka Hachimangū

== Sports ==
=== Sports venues ===
- Iwate Morioka Stadium
- Morioka Racecourse
- Morioka Takaya Arena

=== Sports teams ===
- Iwate Big Bulls, basketball team
- Iwate Grulla Morioka, football team

== Religion ==
=== Temples and shrines ===
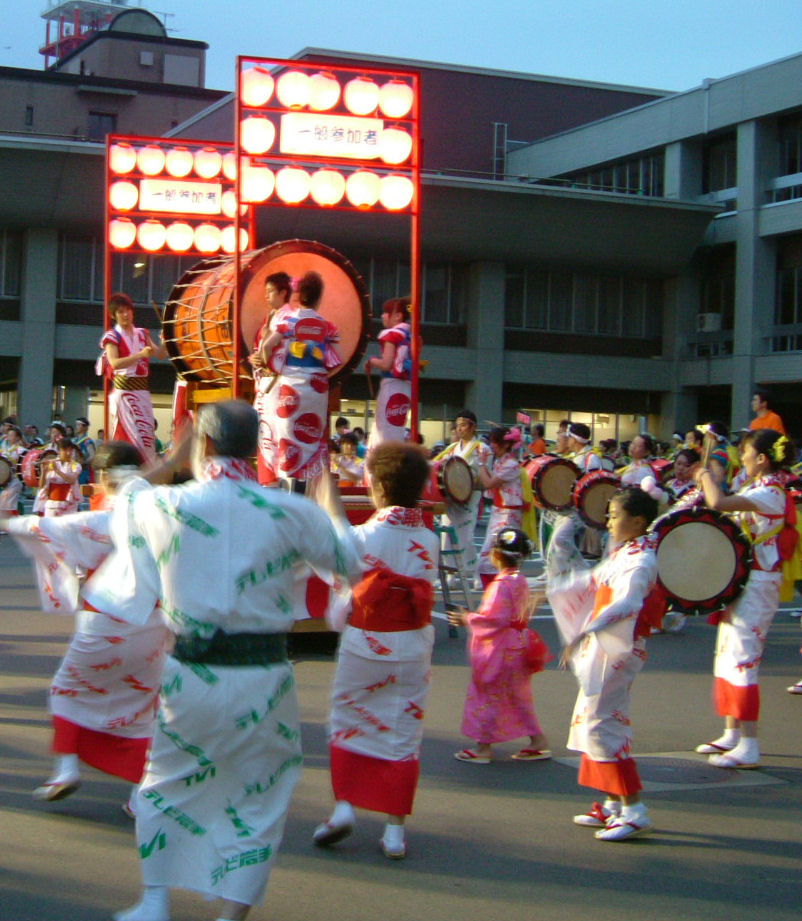
Sansa Odori festival

- Hōon-ji is a Sōtō Zen Buddhist temple which was originally built at Sannohe by the 13th lord of the Nambu clan, Nambu Moriyuki, in 1394, and brought to Morioka by the 27th lord, Nambu Toshinao. It was considered the head temple among the 280 operated by the Nambu clan. A notable feature is the Rakan-dō, built in 1735 and rebuilt in 1858. Its central statue Rushana butsu is reported to be made by Kōbō-daishi. Within the Rakan-dō are statues of the 500 Rakan, which were made in Kyoto and later brought to Morioka. Included are representations of Kublai Khan and Marco Polo. It is an active Zen training temple for monks.
- Mitsuishi Jinja is a Shinto shrine which has three large rocks on the grounds with shackles around them to represent the story of 'Oni no tegata', which is a legend explaining the origin of the name of Iwate prefecture. According to the legend, there was once an Oni or demon who often tormented and harassed the local people. When the people prayed to the spirit of Mitsuishi for protection, the demon was immediately shackled to the rocks and made to promise never to trouble the people again. As a sign of this promise, the demon left a handprint on one of the rocks, thus giving rise to the name Iwate, literally meaning "rock hand".
- Morioka Hachiman Shrine
- Sakurayama is a Shinto shrine 20 feet above (6 meters) featuring a massive rock.

== Cuisine ==
Morioka attracts tourists with local noodles such as jajamen, reimen, and wanko soba. Brewing is also a thriving industry of the city. Nambu senbei, a type of rice cracker, is considered a local specialty.

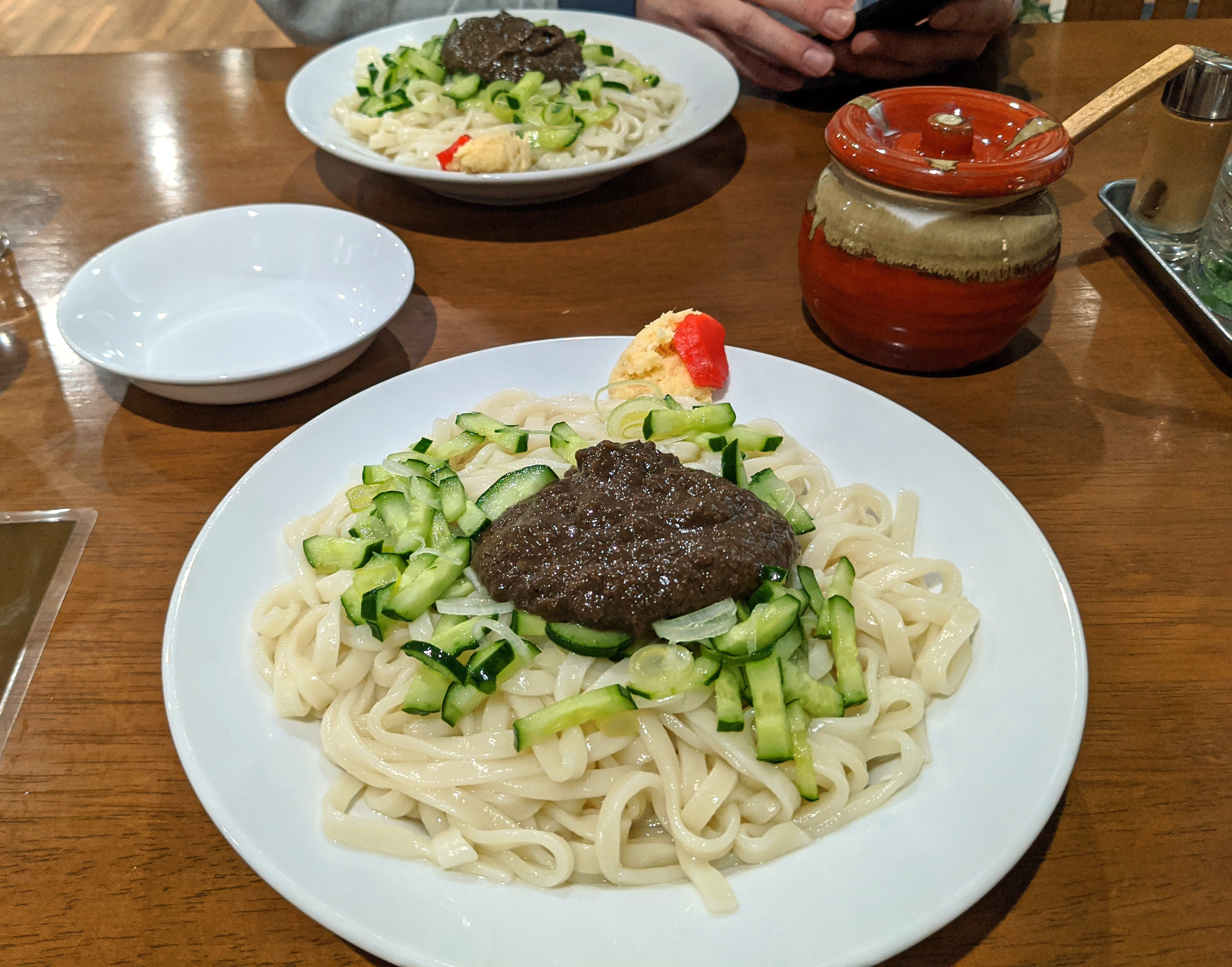
Morioka jajamen

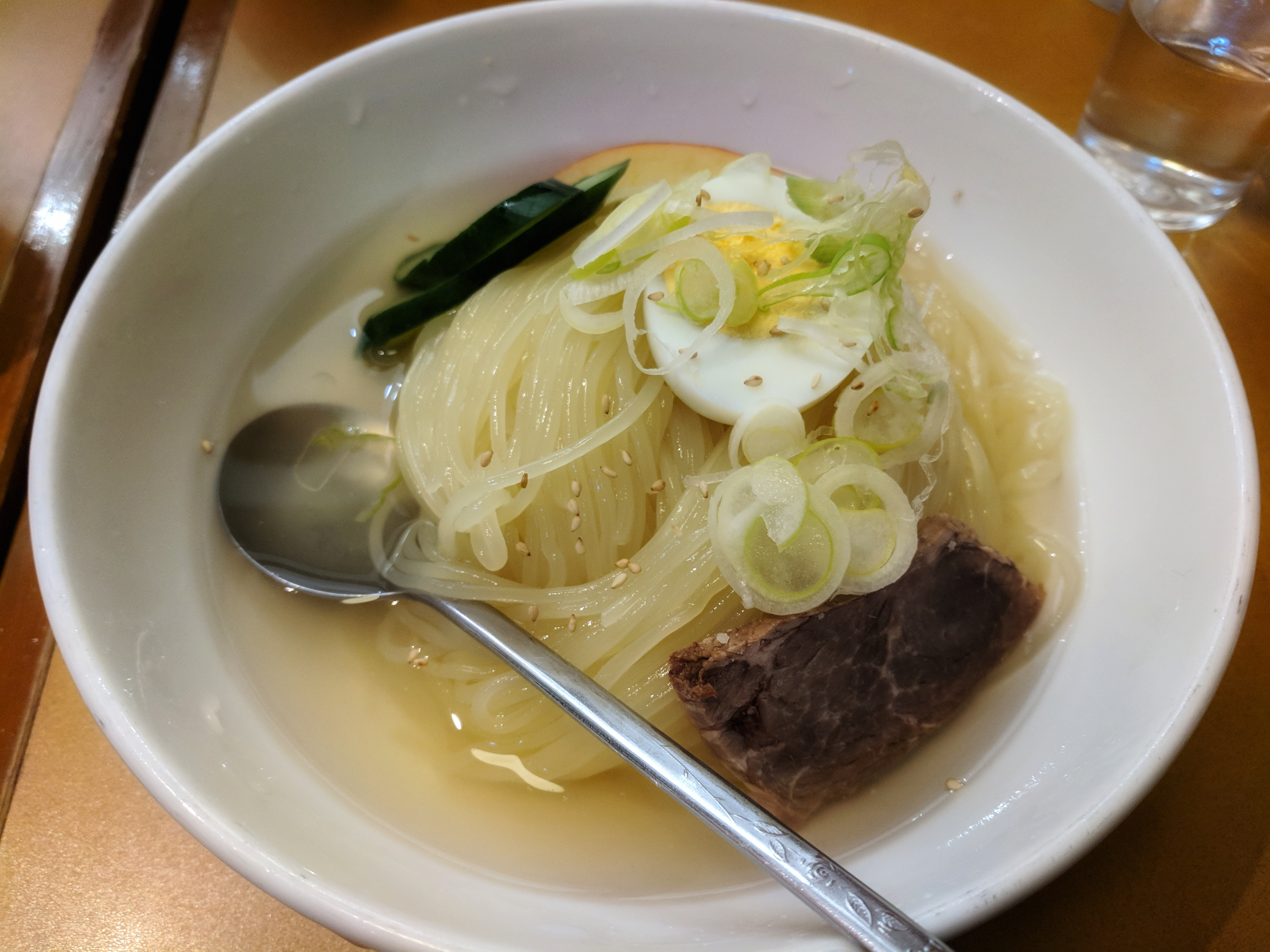
Morioka reimen

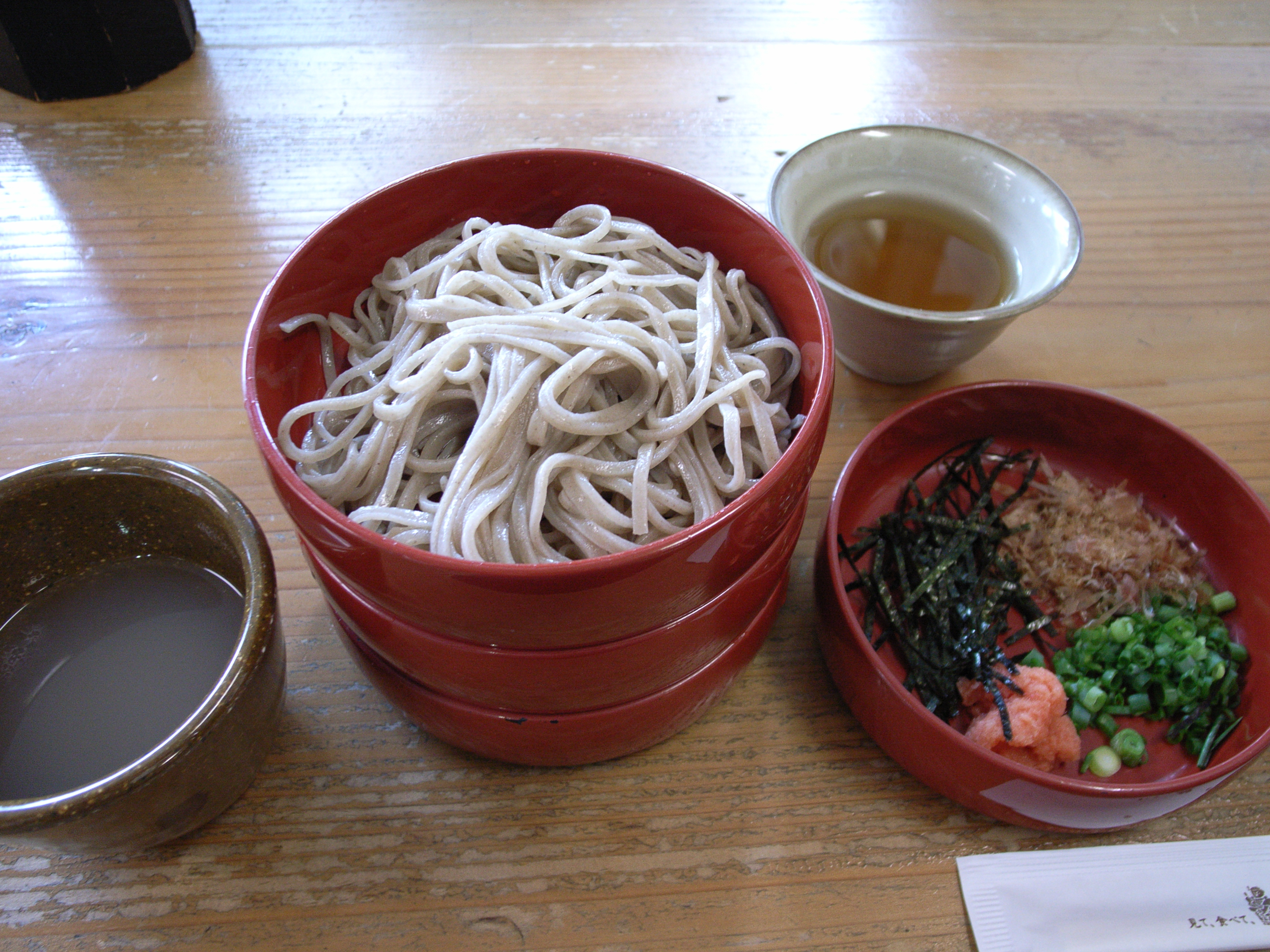
Wanko soba

== Media ==
- Iwate Asahi Television
- Iwate Broadcasting Company
- Iwate Menkoi Television
- Iwate Nippo
- Television Iwate

== International relations ==
- Victoria, British Columbia, Canada (sister city since 1985)

== Notable people ==
- The Great Sasuke, professional wrestler
- Takuboku Ishikawa, poet
- Takuya Kawamura, professional basketball player
- Yusei Kikuchi, professional baseball player
- Taka Michinoku, professional wrestler
- Yōko Mihara, actress
- Milano Collection A.T., professional wrestler
- Inazō Nitobe, author, educator, diplomat, and politician during the Meiji period and Taishō period
- Mitsuo Ogasawara, footballer
- Takatō Ōshima, engineer - made the first Western-style cannon in Japan
- Mikoi Sasaki, actress
- Haruka Chisuga, voice actress and singer
- Yota Sato (boxer), professional boxer
- Shinji Sōmai, film director
- Hara Takashi, former Prime Minister of Japan
- Nishikigi Tetsuya, sumo wrestler
- Mitsumasa Yonai, former Prime Minister of Japan
- Miyuki Tanobe, artist and painter
