= Iwate Museum of Art =

- 岩手県立美術館
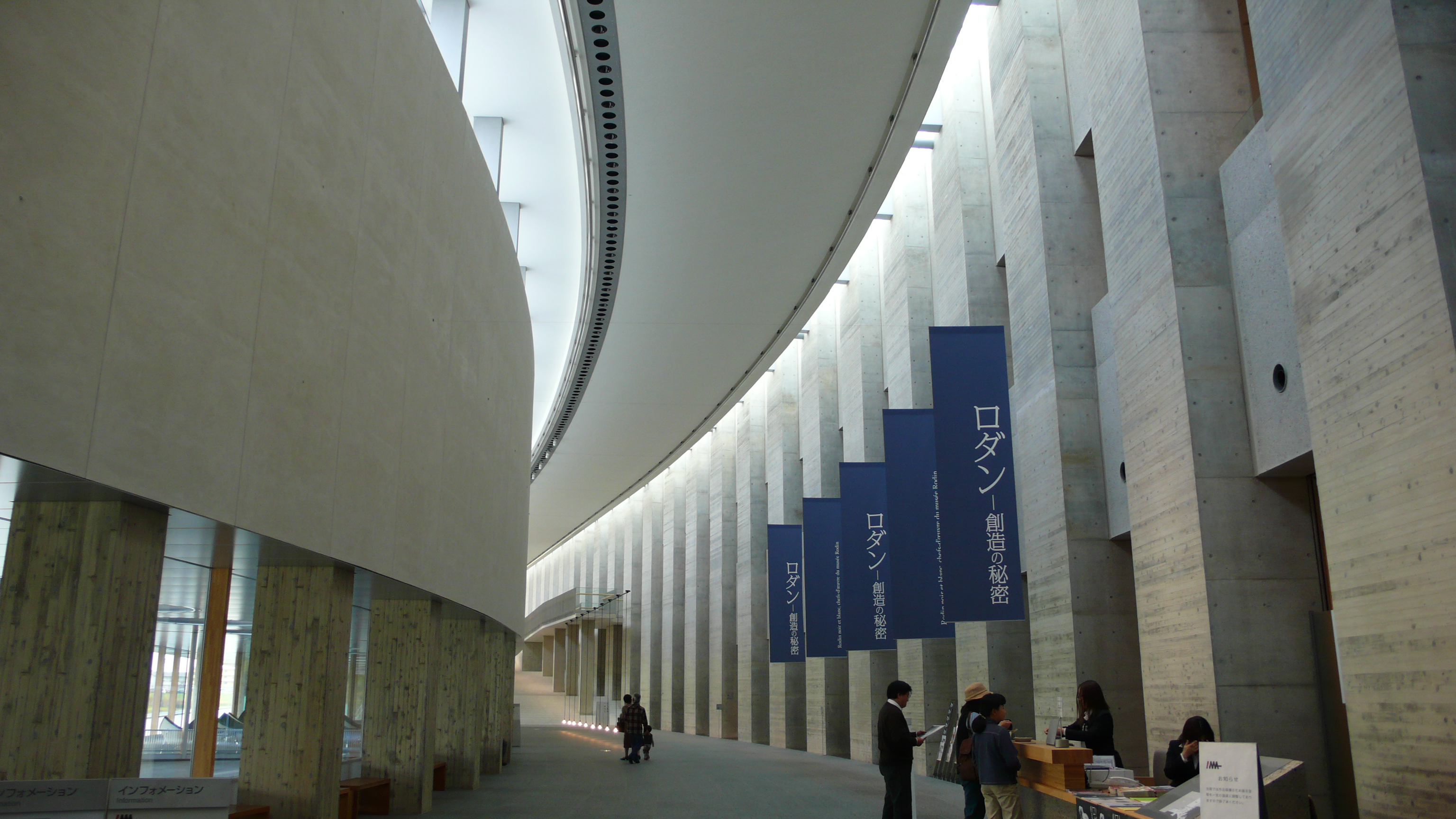
- Interactive map of the Iwate Museum of Art area

General information
- Location: 12-3 Matsuhaba, Motomiya, Morioka, Iwate Prefecture, Japan
- Coordinates: 39°41′36.6″N 141°7′29.6″E
- Opened: October 2001

Technical details
- Floor count: 2 above ground
- Floor area: 10,061.66 m2

Design and construction
- Architecture firm: Nihonsekkei

Website
- www.ima.or.jp/en/

The Iwate Museum of Art (岩手県立美術館, Iwate Kenritsu Bijutsukan) is an art museum in Morioka, Japan. It was opened in 2001.

The museum has a permanent exhibition of works by local Iwate Prefecture artists Tetsugoro Yorozu, Shunsuke Matsumoto and Yasutake Funakoshi, and houses temporary exhibitions on both Japanese and foreign themes.
