= List of historic sites of Japan (Iwate) =

This list is of the historic sites of Japan located within the Prefecture of Iwate.

== National Historic Sites ==
As of 24 June 2024, thirty-four Sites have been designated as being of national significance (including three *Special Historic Sites).

Site	Municipality	Comments	Image	Coordinates	Type	Ref.
*Chūson-ji Precinct 中尊寺境内 Chūson-ji keidai	Hiraizumi	component of the UNESCO World Heritage Site Hiraizumi – Temples, Gardens and Archaeological Sites Representing the Buddhist Pure Land	Chūson-ji Precinct	39°00′07″N 141°06′00″E	3	165
*Muryōkō-in ruins 無量光院跡 Muryōkōin ato	Hiraizumi	component of the UNESCO World Heritage Site Hiraizumi – Temples, Gardens and Archaeological Sites Representing the Buddhist Pure Land	Muryōkō-in ruins	38°59′35″N 141°06′57″E	3	117
*Mōtsū-ji Precinct and associated Chinjusha 毛越寺境内 附 鎮守社跡 Mōtsūji keidai tsuketari chinjūsha ato	Hiraizumi	component of the UNESCO World Heritage Site Hiraizumi – Temples, Gardens and Archaeological Sites Representing the Buddhist Pure Land	Mōtsū-ji Precinct	38°59′26″N 141°06′56″E	3	116
Ayaorishinden Site 綾織新田遺跡 Ayaorishinden iseki	Tōno	Jōmon period settlement ruins		39°19′01″N 141°17′56″E	1	3344
Ōshū Kaidō 奥州街道 Ōshū Kaidō	Ichinohe, Iwate	Edo period highway		40°14′20″N 141°28′07″E	6	00003655
Shimofunato Shell Mound 下船渡貝塚 Shimofunato kaizuka	Ōfunato	Jōmon period shell midden		39°02′16″N 141°43′09″E	1	129
Tsunozuka Kofun 角塚古墳 Tsunozuka kofun	Ōshū	Kofun period tumuli	Tsunozuka Kofun	39°08′29″N 141°05′37″E	1	168
Kabayama Site 樺山遺跡 Kabayama iseki	Kitakami	Jōmon period settlement	Kabayama Site	39°14′32″N 141°07′48″E	1	163
Hashino iron mining and smelting site 橋野高炉跡 Hashino kōro ato	Kamaishi	oldest Western-style blast furnace in Japan, built in 1858; influenced the development of the Yawata Steel Works and for this reason a component of the UNESCO World Heritage Site Sites of Japan’s Meiji Industrial Revolution: Iron and Steel, Shipbuilding and Coal Mining	Hashino Blast Furnace Site	39°20′36″N 141°40′57″E	6	157
Kinkeizan 金鶏山 Kinkeizan	Hiraizumi	component of the UNESCO World Heritage Site Hiraizumi – Temples, Gardens and Archaeological Sites Representing the Buddhist Pure Land	Kinkeizan	38°59′36″N 141°06′33″E	2,3	3428
Kunohe Castle ruins 九戸城跡 Kunohe-jō ato	Ninohe	Muromachi period castle ruins	Kunohe Castle ruins	40°16′04″N 141°18′11″E	2	134
Goshono site 御所野遺跡 Goshono iseki	Ichinohe	component of the UNESCO World Heritage Site Jōmon Prehistoric Sites in Northern Japan	Goshono site	40°11′53″N 141°18′23″E	1	169
Ezuriko Kofun Cluster 江釣子古墳群 Ezuriko kofun-gun	Kitakami	Kofun period tumuli	Ezuriko Kofun Cluster	39°17′29″N 141°04′56″E	1	166
Former Residence of Takano Chōei 高野長英旧宅 Takano Chōei kyū-taku	Ōshū	Bakumatsu period rangaku scholar residence		39°08′30″N 141°08′28″E	8	128
Kunimisan temple ruins 国見山廃寺跡 Kunimisan Haiji ato	Kitakami	Heian period temple ruins	Kunimisan temple ruins	39°15′48″N 141°08′32″E	3	3398
Honederamura Shōen ruins 骨寺村荘園遺跡 Honederamura shōen iseki	Ichinoseki	Heian period estate ruins	Honederamura Shōen Site	38°58′54″N 140°57′06″E	6	3415
Sakiyama Shell Mound 崎山貝塚 Sakiyama kaizuka	Miyako	Jōmon period shell midden	Sakiyama Shell Mound	39°40′29″N 141°57′41″E	1	170
Shiwa Castle ruins 志波城跡 Shiwa-jō ato	Morioka	Heian period castle ruins	Shiwa Castle ruins	39°41′08″N 141°06′22″E	2	167
Morioka Castle 盛岡城跡 Morioka-jō ato	Morioka	Edo period castle	Morioka Castle	39°42′02″N 141°09′04″E	2	141
Ōsuzukami Site 大清水上遺跡 Ōsuzukami iseki	Ōshū	Jōmon period settlement ruins		39°06′47″N 140°57′14″E	1	00003597
Ōhora Shell Mound 大洞貝塚 Ōhora kaizuka	Ōfunato	Jōmon period shell midden		39°04′01″N 141°44′40″E	1	3299
Takonoura Shell Mound 蛸ノ浦貝塚 Takonoura kaizuka	Ōfunato	Jōmon period shell midden		39°02′08″N 141°44′23″E	1	130
Takkoku-no-Iwaya 達谷窟 Takkoku-no-Iwaya	Hiraizumi	Heian period Buddhist site	Takkoku-no-Iwaya	38°58′08″N 141°03′29″E	3	3414
Isawa Castle Site 胆沢城跡 Isawa-jō ato	Ōshū	Heian period castle ruins	Isawa Castle Site	39°10′51″N 141°08′07″E	2	118
Nakazawahama Shell Mound 中沢浜貝塚 Nakazawahama kaizuka	Rikuzentakata	Jōmon period shell midden		38°57′16″N 141°41′39″E	1	131
Tokutan Castle ruins 徳丹城跡 Tokutan-jō ato	Yahaba	Heian period castle ruins	Tokutan Castle ruins	39°36′28″N 141°10′21″E	2	159
Nanbu-Date border mounds 南部領伊達領境塚 Nanbu-ryō Date-ryō	Kitakami, Kanegasaki	Edo period border markers		39°15′53″N 141°03′03″E	2	3252
Hatten Site 八天遺跡 Hatten iseki	Kitakami	Jōmon period settlement ruins		39°19′44″N 141°09′26″E	1	164
Yanagi-no-Gosho and Sites of Hiraizumi 柳之御所・平泉遺跡群 Yanagi-no-Gosho - Hiraizumi iseki-gun	Hiraizumi, Ōshū	designation includes the sites in Ōshū of Chōjagahara temple ruins (長者ヶ原廃寺跡) and Shirotoridate ruins (白鳥舘遺跡), which formed part of the original 2006 World Heritage nomination of "Hiraizumi - Cultural Landscape Associated with Pure Land Buddhist Cosmology"	Yanagi-no-Gosho	38°59′37″N 141°07′09″E	2	171
Tonomi Palisade ruins 鳥海柵跡 Tonomi-no-saku iseki	Kanegasaki	Heian period castle ruins	Tonomi Palisade ruins	39°11′22″N 141°06′52″E	2	00003816
Yakata Site 屋形遺跡 Yakata iseki	Kamaishi			39°10′54″N 141°53′43″E	1	00004110
Kuriki Iron Mine Site 栗木鉄山跡 Kuriki tetsuzan ato	Sumita			39°10′05″N 141°25′08″E	6	00004139
Nabekura Castle Site 鍋倉城跡 Nabekura-jō ato	Tōno	Sengoku-Edo period castle	Nabekura Castle Site	39°19′35″N 141°31′38″E	2	00004171
Kuroyama Pit Dwelling Site 黒山の昔穴遺跡; Kuroyama no mukashi ana iseki	Kunohe			40°14′14″N 141°23′27″E		

== Prefectural Historic Sites ==
As of 1 May 2024, thirty-seven Sites have been designated as being of prefectural importance.

Site	Municipality	Comments	Image	Coordinates	Type	Ref.
Noda Pit Dwelling Sites 野田竪穴住居跡群; Noda tateana jūkyo seki-gun	Noda			40°06′12″N 141°48′10″E		
Dorota temple ruins 泥田廃寺跡; Dorota Haiji ato	Ichinoseki			38°56′20″N 141°06′50″E		
Sekiya Cave Dwelling Site 関谷洞窟住居跡; Sekiya dōkutsu jūkyo ato	Ōfunato			39°07′39″N 141°40′21″E		
Funakubo Cave 舟久保洞窟; Funakubo dōkutsu	Shiwa			39°34′19″N 141°14′46″E		
Senba-Tsutsumi Pit Dwelling Site 仙波堤竪穴住居跡; Senba-Tsutsumi tateana jūkyo ato	Iwate			39°57′36″N 141°10′49″E		
Imamatsu Pit Dwelling Site 今松竪穴住居跡; Imamatsu tateana jūkyo ato	Iwate			39°57′43″N 141°09′17″E		
Ezomori Kofun えぞ森古墳; Ezomori kofun	Yahaba			39°37′02″N 141°10′10″E		
Ukishima Kofun Cluster 浮島古墳群; Ukishima kofun-gun	Iwate			39°56′23″N 141°08′50″E		
Nippei Site 新平遺跡; Nippei iseki	Yahaba			39°19′07″N 141°03′49″E		
Myōgozawa Tile Excavation Site 明後沢古瓦出土地; Myōgozawa ko-kawara shutsudo-chi	Ōshū			39°05′05″N 141°07′35″E		
Futago and Narita Ichirizuka 二子・成田一里塚; Futago・Narita Ichirizuka	Kitakami			39°20′53″N 141°07′49″E		
Tannaisan Jinja Sutra Mound 丹内山神社経塚; Tannaisan Jinja kyōzuka	Hanamaki			39°20′49″N 141°17′15″E		
Kaitori Shell Mound 貝鳥貝塚; Kaitori kaizuka	Ichinoseki			38°47′02″N 141°10′20″E		
Shimokado Okahijirizuka 下門岡ひじり塚; Shimokado Okahijirizuka	Kitakami			39°14′48″N 141°08′22″E		
Shizukuishi Kaidō Ichirizuka 雫石街道の一里塚; Shizukuishi Kaidō no ichirizuka	Takizawa, Shizukuishi			39°42′03″N 141°03′00″E		
Ezo Ichirizuka 江曽一里塚; Ezo ichirizuka	Hanamaki			39°27′07″N 141°08′19″E		
Isseki-Ichijō Sutra Mound 一石一字経塚; Isseki-Ichijō kyōzuka	Miyako			39°38′33″N 141°56′30″E		
Matsusakigawa Ichirizuka 末崎川一里塚; Matsusakigawa ichirizuka	Morioka			39°50′21″N 141°28′52″E		
Bishamondōhira Ichirizuka 毘沙門堂平一里塚; Bishamondōhira ichirizuka	Morioka			39°50′48″N 141°25′50″E		
Tsukanosawa Ichirizuka 塚の沢一里塚; Tsukanosawa ichirizuka	Morioka			39°49′40″N 141°23′06″E		
Ōhashi Ichirizuka 大橋一里塚; Ōhashi ichirizuka	Morioka			39°49′40″N 141°19′38″E		
Onomatsu Ichirizuka 小野松一里塚; Onomatsu ichirizuka	Morioka			39°46′01″N 141°09′57″E		
Niizuka Ichirizuka 新塚一里塚; Niizuka ichirizuka	Morioka			39°52′22″N 141°11′03″E		
Ōtake temple ruins 大竹廃寺跡; Ōtake Haiji ato	Kitakami			39°18′35″N 141°09′39″E		
Takahatake Ichirizuka 高畑一里塚; Takahatake ichirizuka	Morioka			39°41′16″N 141°14′56″E		
Kuribayashi Copper Mint ruins 栗林銭座跡; Kuribayashi zeniza ato	Kamaishi			39°20′07″N 141°49′22″E		
Kawarage Tile Kiln ruins 川原毛瓦窯跡; Kawarage kawara kama ato	Shiwa			39°34′05″N 141°09′14″E		
Kotsunagi Ichirizuka 小繋一里塚; Kotsunagi ichirizuka	Ichinohe			40°07′00″N 141°16′32″E		
Ueda Ichirizuka 上田一里塚; Ueda ichirizuka	Morioka			39°44′08″N 141°08′35″E		
Kouchikyū Ichirizuka 好地旧一里塚; Kouchikyū ichirizuka	Hanamaki			39°29′30″N 141°08′35″E		
Tamagawa Iron Mine ruins 玉川鉄山跡; Tamagawa tetsuzan ato	Karumai			40°16′53″N 141°34′33″E		
Ōzuchi Castle ruins 大槌城跡; Ōzuchi-jō ato	Ōtsuchi			39°21′42″N 141°53′46″E		
Tateishino Ichi Site 館石野I遺跡; Tateishino ichi iseki	Tanohata			39°54′09″N 141°55′40″E		
Ōdate Settlement Site 大館町遺跡; Ōdate-chō ato	Morioka	inhabited from the late Jōmon to the Heian period		39°42′55″N 141°06′50″E		
Kuriki Iron Mine Site 栗木鉄山跡; Kuriki tetsuzan ato	Sumita			39°10′05″N 141°25′08″E		
Yubunezawa Stone Circle 湯舟沢環状列石; Yubunezawa kanjō resseki	Takizawa			39°46′52″N 141°05′51″E		

== Municipal Historic Sites ==
As of 1 May 2024, a further one hundred and eighty-five Sites have been designated as being of municipal importance.

== See also ==
- Cultural Properties of Japan
- Mutsu Province
- Iwate Prefectural Museum
- List of Places of Scenic Beauty of Japan (Iwate)
- List of Cultural Properties of Japan - paintings (Iwate)
