= Kuriki Iron Mine =

- 栗木鉄山 (Japanese)
- Kuriki Iron Mine Kuriki Iron Mine (Japan)
- Interactive map of Kuriki Iron Mine
- 39°10′05″N 141°25′08″E
- Periods: Meiji - Taisho period
- Location: Sumita, Iwate, Japan
- Region: Tohoku region

Site notes
- Public access: Yes (no public facilities)

The Kuriki Iron Mine (栗木鉄山, Kuriki tetsuzan) was Meiji to Taisho period steelworks located in what is now the town of Sumita, Iwate Prefecture, Japan Its ruins were designated a National Historic Site of Japan in 2021

== Overview ==
Contrary to its name, the Kuriki Iron Mine was not a mine at all, but was an early modern steelworks which produced pig iron. It was constructed by the Date clan, the former daimyō of Sendai Domain and opened in 1881. The iron ore was mined from Hitoshi in Esashi County (present-day Esashi, Ōshū, Iwate) and transported initially by horse and cattle. Later, this was supplemented by a ropeway. Charcoal for fuel was produced in-house using trees from the surrounding area, but was also purchased from Ninohe District in northern Iwate. The Kuriki facility had two western-style blast furnaces. Blast Furnace No.1 was originally from the Komakikura Iron Mine, and was relocated to this site. It produced 2-3 tons of pig iron per day. After being dismantled and repaired in 1911, it was producing 5 tons of pig iron per day. During that repair in 1911, it was discovered that trace amounts of gold contained in the raw ore had accumulated in the bottom of the hearth, and it is said that an extra bonus was paid to employees. Blast Furnace No.2 was built in 1908, was equipped with a firing chamber that reused furnace gases. It produced five tons of pig iron per day (eight tons after renovations in 1913). The pig iron produced by these blast furnaces was used by an on-site iron foundry which produced cast ironware for everyday use such as pots, kettles, and bath heaters, as well as wheels for trolleys and iron pipes up to 30-cm in diameter. It also supplied pig iron to nearby large blacksmiths and to a foundry in Ōshū. At its peak in 1917, the steelworks had over 500 employees and had a company village with worker housing, a post office, a store, and a school. It was the fourth largest pig iron producer in Japan and the third largest among private companies. However, in the post World War I economic turndown, the steelworks went bankrupt in 1920.

The site became overgrown by forest, and none of its structures have survived, but the foundations of many buildings, stone walls and waterworks are well preserved. These ruins were endangered by improvement work on Japan National Route 397, which spurred Sumita municipal authorities and Tohoku University to lobby for its preservation as the only remaining example of small and medium-sized blast furnace steelworks from the Meiji to Taisho periods where the steelworks premises remain. The site is approximately 30 kilometers east of Mizusawa Station in Ōshū or 25.0 kilometers west of Kamiarisu Station in Sumita.

=== In popular culture ===
Miyazawa Kenji's "The Sixteenth Day" is said to be set at Kuriki Iron Mine.

== See also ==
- List of Historic Sites of Japan (Iwate)
