= Ōsuzukami Site =

Archaeological site in Japan

- 大清水上遺跡 (Japanese)
- Ōsuzukami Site Ōsuzukami Site (Japan)
- 39°06′47″N 140°57′14″E
- Periods: Jōmon period
- Location: Ōshū, Iwate, Japan
- Region: Tōhoku region

History
- Built: 3000 BC

Site notes
- Elevation: 270 m (890 ft)
- Public access: Yes (no public facilities)

Ōsuzukami Site (大清水上遺跡, Ōsuzukami iseki) is an archaeological site with the remains of a late Jōmon period settlement located in what is now the city of Ōshū, Iwate Prefecture in the Tōhoku region of northern Japan. It has been protected by the central government as a National Historic Site since 2008.

== Overview ==
The Ōsuzukami site is located in the southwestern portion of Iwate Prefecture, on a river terrace with an altitude of 280 meters. It was excavated in the year 2000 in conjunction with the construction of the Isawa Dam, and as a result of the findings, the design of the dam was altered to preserve the site. The excavation revealed a central square with a diameter of approximately 20 meters, surrounded by 62 large raised floor pillar dwellings orientated with their long axis facing towards the center of the square. Outside the large pit dwellings were smaller pit dwellings, and simple pits which were used for storage purposes. In the similar Ayaorishinden Site, the dwellings were not orientated towards the central plaza, and thus the Ōsuzukami site marks a transition to the ring settlements which spread throughout Japan in the middle of the Jōmon period. There was evidence of frequent rebuilding and expansion, indicating that the site had been used for a long period of time.

The site was backfilled after excavation, and there is nothing at the site today except for an explanatory plaque. The site is located about 50 minutes by car from Mizusawa Interchange on the Tohoku Expressway.

== See also ==
- List of Historic Sites of Japan (Iwate)
