= Gokuraku-ji (Kitakami) =

Buddhist temple in Kitakami, Japan

- 極楽寺
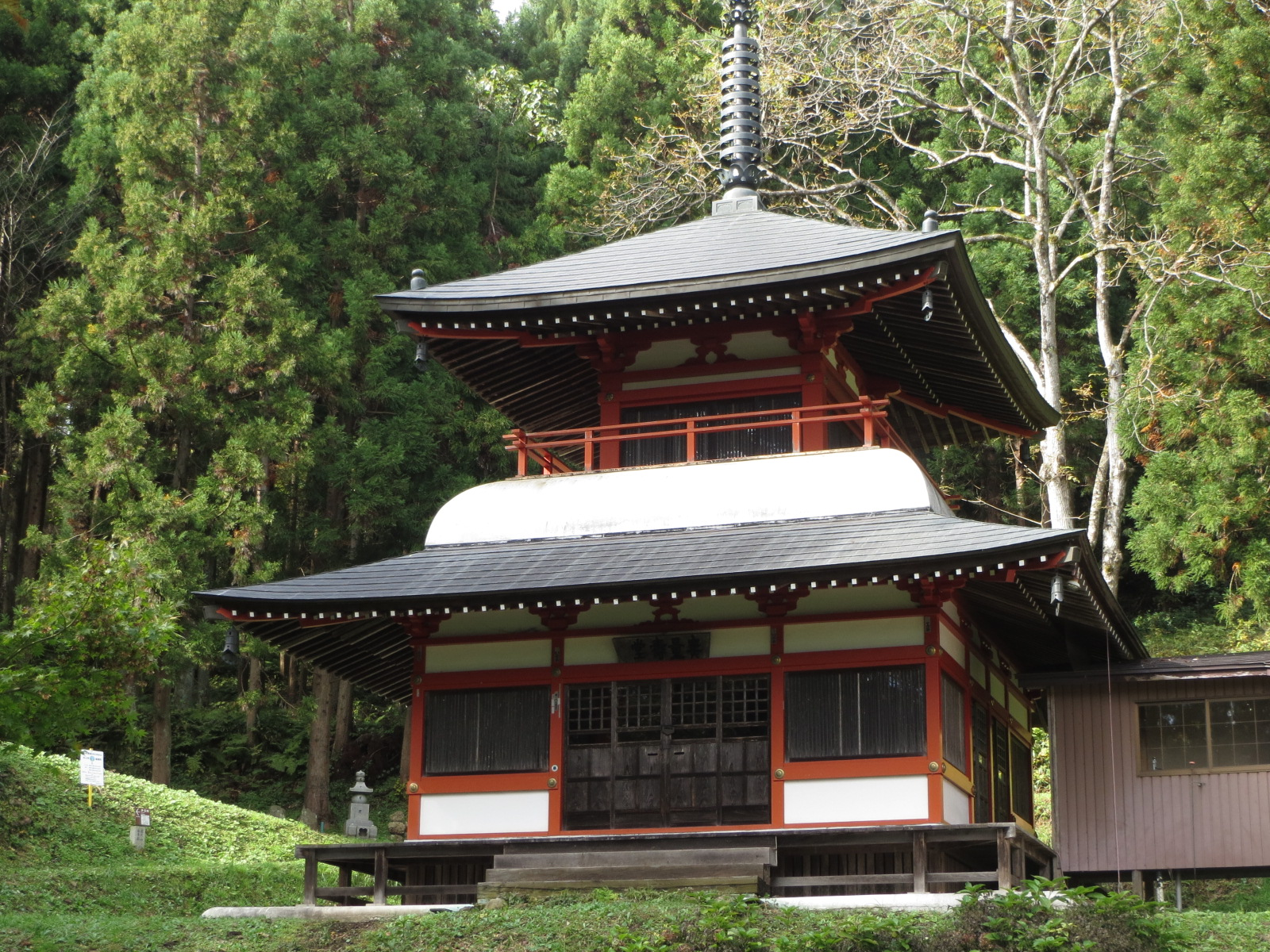
- Pagoda of Gokuraku-ji

- Location within Iwate Prefecture Location within Japan

Religion
- Affiliation: Buddhist
- Deity: Amida Nyōrai
- Rite: Shingon
- Status: functional

Location
- Location: Iwase-chō, Kitakami-shi, Iwate-ken
- Country: Japan
- Interactive map of Gokuraku-ji
- Coordinates: 39°15′45.3″N 141°8′23.8″E

Architecture
- Completed: 857 AD

Gokuraki-ji (極楽寺) is a Buddhist temple located in the former Esahi District of what is now the city of Kitakami, in Iwate Prefecture in the far northern Tōhoku region of Japan, located at the base of the 244 metres (801 ft) Mount Kunimi. The temple belongs to the Shingon sect and its main image is a statue of Amida Nyōrai. Gokuraku-ji is currently managed by Michio Shito. Michio Shito also practices in Anraku-ji l ocated in Inascho, Kitakami.

== History ==
Gokuraku-ji was founded on the eastern bank of the Kitakami River in the year 857 AD, during the reign of Emperor Montoku. This coincides with the invasion of the region by the armies of the Yamato court and the suppression of the local Emishi tribes, and the construction of nearby Isawa Castle. The Yamato general Sakanoue no Tamuramaro is recorded to have donated a statue of Bishamon to the temple. At one point the temple is said to have had over 700 structures, including 36 dormitories for monks and to have covered the entire stopes of Mount Kunimi. The original temple appears to have fallen mostly into ruins after the destruction of the Abe clan by the Kiyohara clan in the Former Nine Years War in the late Heian period in the 10th to 11th centuries. Several smaller temple appeared in the Kamakura and Muromachi periods on its ruins, of which the present temple of Gokuraku-ji laid claim to the temple's original name due to its possession of two statues of Bishamon from the original temple.

== National Historic Site ==
Kunimizan Temple ruins (国見山廃寺跡, Kunimizan haiji ato) is an archaeological site discovered in 1936 from roof tiles during road construction work. Subsequent excavation by the Kitakami City Board of Education from 1963 to 1968 uncovered the foundation stones for one large and three smaller buildings, and one pagoda on the eastern and southern slopes of the mountain at an altitude of between 150 and 200 meters. The location and layout correspond to the original location of Gokuraku-ji given in the historical record. Excavations continued after the year 1987, uncovering a large portion of the site, with foundation stones for structures from the 10-11th centuries, and numerous fragments of Buddhist statues, roof tiles and other ceramics, and the metal filials of staffs used by Buddhist monks. Some of these artifacts were designated Important Cultural Properties and are housed at the Kitakami City Museum.

The site was protected by the central government as a National Historic Site in the year 2002.

== See also ==
- List of Historic Sites of Japan (Iwate)
