= Hatten Site =

Jōmon period archaeological site in Kitakami, Tōhoku, Japan

Hatten ruins
- 八天遺跡 (Japanese)
- Hatten ruins Hatten Site (Japan)
- 39°19′44″N 141°09′26″E
- Type: settlement
- Periods: Jōmon period
- Location: Kitakami, Iwate, Japan
- Region: Tōhoku region

History
- Built: 2000 BC to 1200 AD

Site notes
- Elevation: 270 m (890 ft)
- Area: 2 ha (4.9 acres)
- Excavation dates: 1977
- Public access: Yes

Hatten site (八天遺跡, Hatten iseki) is an archaeological site with the ruins of a Jōmon period settlement in what is now part of the city of Kitakami, Iwate in the Tōhoku region of northern Japan. It has been protected by the central government as a National Historic Site since 1978.

== Overview ==
The Hatten ruins are located on a tongue-shaped river terrace on the eastern fringe of the Kitakami Basin overlooking the Kitakami River. The site has been excavated on five occasions, with remnants from the Japanese Paleolithic era found in the southeastern corner of the site, and the foundations of four pit dwellings from the Heian period found in the central area, indicating continuous habitation for several thousand years.

Most of the remains date from the middle to late Jōmon era. The village contained a central hall with a dimensions of approximately 17 meters in length and 8 meters in width, which had been reconstructed on at least eight occasions, indicating that it was a building for public or ceremonial use. On the slopes to the east and west sides of the village were middens containing a large number of earthenware fragments.

Of especial note were fragments of clay ears, noses and mouths, with holes indicating that they were connected by strings. These are thought be part of grave masks as they were found in a stone-lined pit tomb on the site. These artifacts were given the status of Important Cultural Properties by the national government in 1992.

The site is approximately 17 minutes by car from JR East Tōhoku Main Line Murasakino Station.

== See also ==
- List of Historic Sites of Japan (Iwate)
