= Nabekura Castle =

Castle in Tōno, Iwate, Japan

- 鍋倉城
- Tōno, Iwate Japan
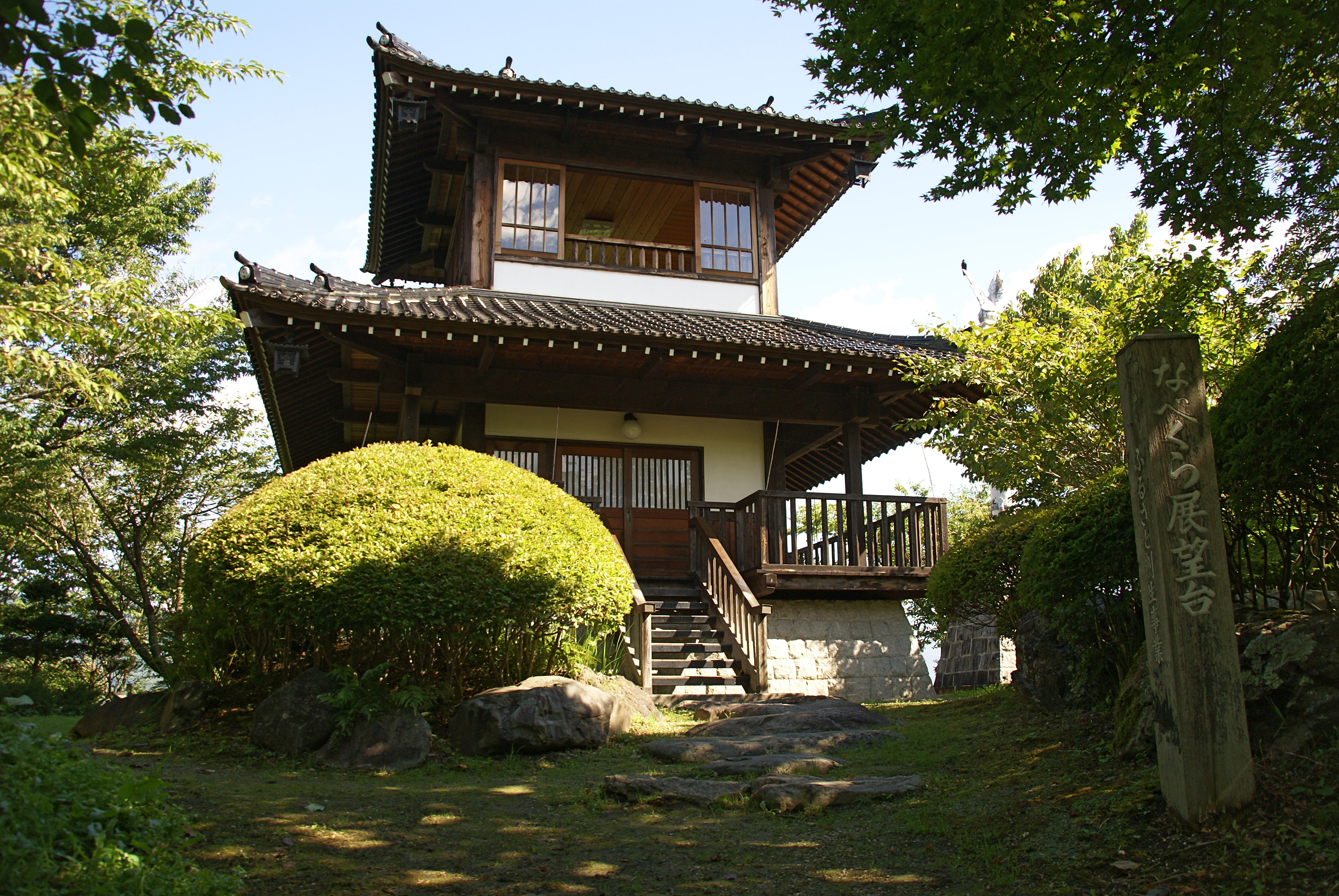
- Nabekura Castle

Site information
- Type: yamajiro-style Japanese castle
- Controlled by: Asonuma clan, Nanbu clan
- Open to the public: yes
- Condition: Archaeological and designated national historical site; castle ruins

Location
- Coordinates: 39°19′33.2″N 141°31′38.3″E

Site history
- Built: 1573-1592
- Built by: Asonuma Hirosato
- In use: Sengoku to Edo period
- National Historic Site of Japan

Nabekura Castle (鍋倉城, Nabekura-jō) was a Sengoku period yamajiro-style Japanese castle located in the city of Tōno, Iwate Prefecture, Japan. Its ruins have been protected as a National Historic Site since 2023. It is also known as Tōno Castle (遠野城, Tōno-jō) or Yokota Castle (横田城, Yokota-jō).

== Overview ==
Nabekura Castle is built on mount Nabekura, an independent hill at the foot of Mount Monomi, at an elevation of about 340 meters, south of the current urban center of the city of Tōno. The fortification is on a protruding ridge, connected to the mountain to the rear nly by a narrow saddle. The Sarugaishi River and Hayase River form the outer moat and the Kurauchi River forms the inner moat. The Inner bailey (120 x 24 meters) is in the center, the second bailey (88 x 45m) is to the south across a dry moat, and the third bailey (135 x 29 meters) to the northeast of the main enclosure. Earthworks can be seen on the west side of the main enclosure, and cornerstones can be seen in the main enclosure and the second enclosure. Moat remnants still exist between the main enclosure and the second enclosure, as well as on the west side of the main enclosure and the second enclosure.The terrace at the below the third bailey now used as the ground of Nanbu Shrine was location of the main gate, and the ground used by the folklore museum was the place of hillside residence of the lord.

== HIstory ==
The precise year is unknown but this site was fortified by local Asonuma clan in the latter half of 16th century. Asonuma clan was a descendant of Fujiwara Hidetsuna and were originally from Shimotsuke Province. Asonuma clan served Minamoto Yoritomo, who awarded the clan this territory for their part in the Invasion of Hiraizumi in 1189. After the fall of the Kamakura shogunate, the Asonuma clan supported Kitabatake Akiie, but later pledged fealty to the Muromachi shogunate. The clan ruled the Tōno Basin and held a portion of the coast near Kamaishi. The clan initially made their stronghold at Yokota Castle (横田城, Yokota-jō), north of Sarugaishi River. However, this site was prone to flooding, so at the beginning of the Tenshō era (1573–1593), Asonuma Hirosato moved from Yokota Castle to a new site on Mount Nabekura, retaining the name "Yokota Castle".

However, in 1590, the Asonuma clan was punuished by Toyotomi Hideyoshi for failing pledge fealty at the Siege of Odawara, becoming retainers of the Nanbu clan. Although the Asonuma assisted the Nanbu clan in various battles, the clan had strong ties with the Date clan to the south and after Asonuma Hironaga was expelled by the Nambu in 16000, he fled south, and attempted to retake his territories on three occasions with assistance from the Date. Each attempt failed, and as a result the Nanbu clan purged the remaining clan members from its territory, executing Asonuma Hirashimizu in 1615. The castle was thereafter ruled by magistrates, and in 1627, Nanbu Toshinao moved Hachinohe Naoyoshi from Ne Castle to Yokota Castle with the authority to exercise control over the former Asonuma domain and with guarding the border with Sendai Domain. Yokota Castle was restored and renamed "Nabekura Castle" at that time. Although the Tokugawa shogunate had issued an edict limiting each domain to a single castle, Morioka Domain was an exception and retained Nabekura Castle due to its strategic location against the Date clan. In 1642, the Nanbu clan and Date clan finally agreed delimitation of their border, and constructed the Nanbu-Date border mounds were constructed over 130 kilometer long line to demarcate the border. The descendants of Nanbu Naoyoshi continued to rule a 12,000 koku hatamoto fief of Morioka Domain from Nabekura Castle to the Meiji restoration.

The castle was abandoned in 1872, and all that remains are remnants of the enclosures on the mountain, portions of dry moats and clay walls. The site is now maintained as Nabekura Park, and is about 0.8 kilometers from JR East Tōno Station, or approximately 15 minutes on foot.

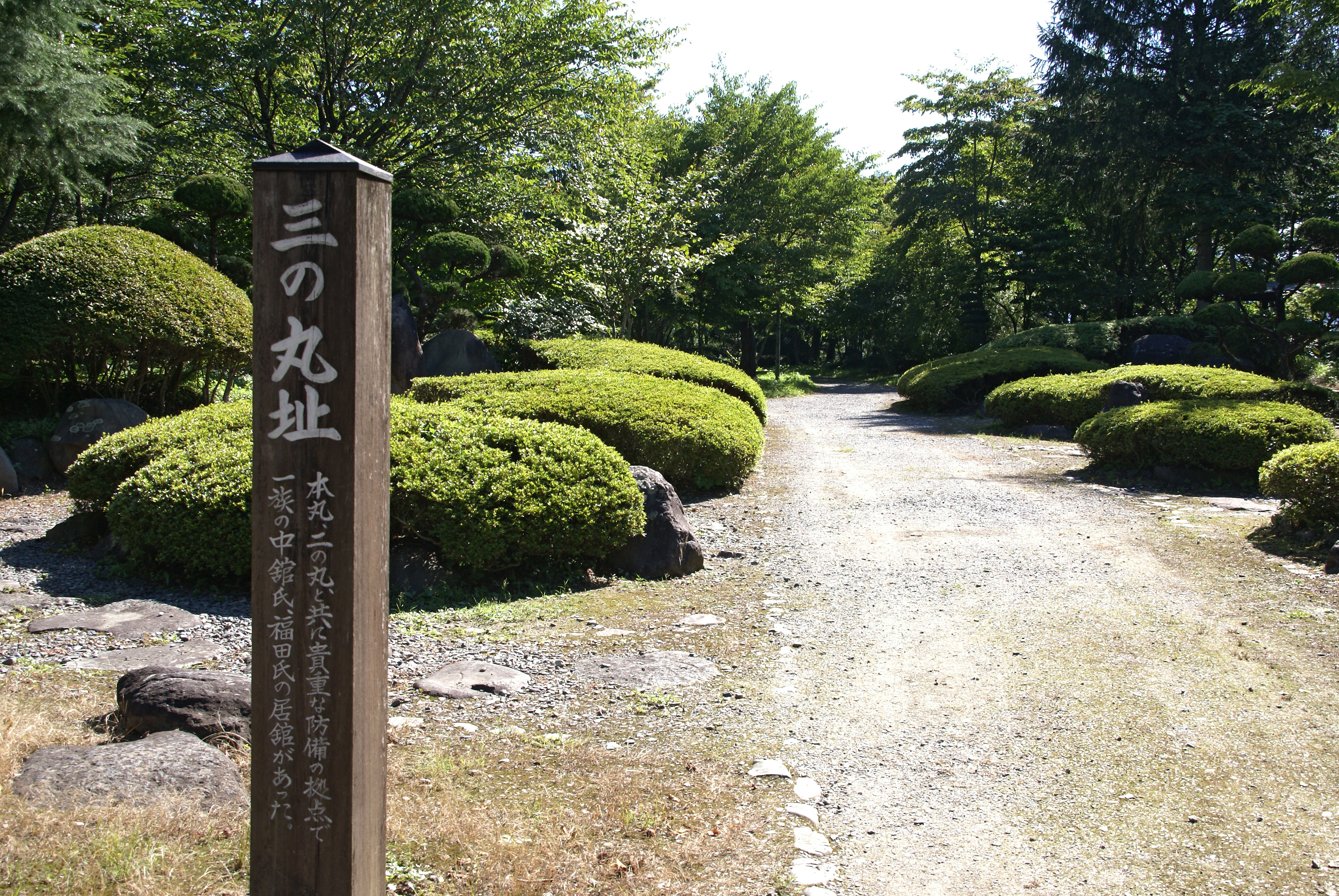
Site of Third Bailey

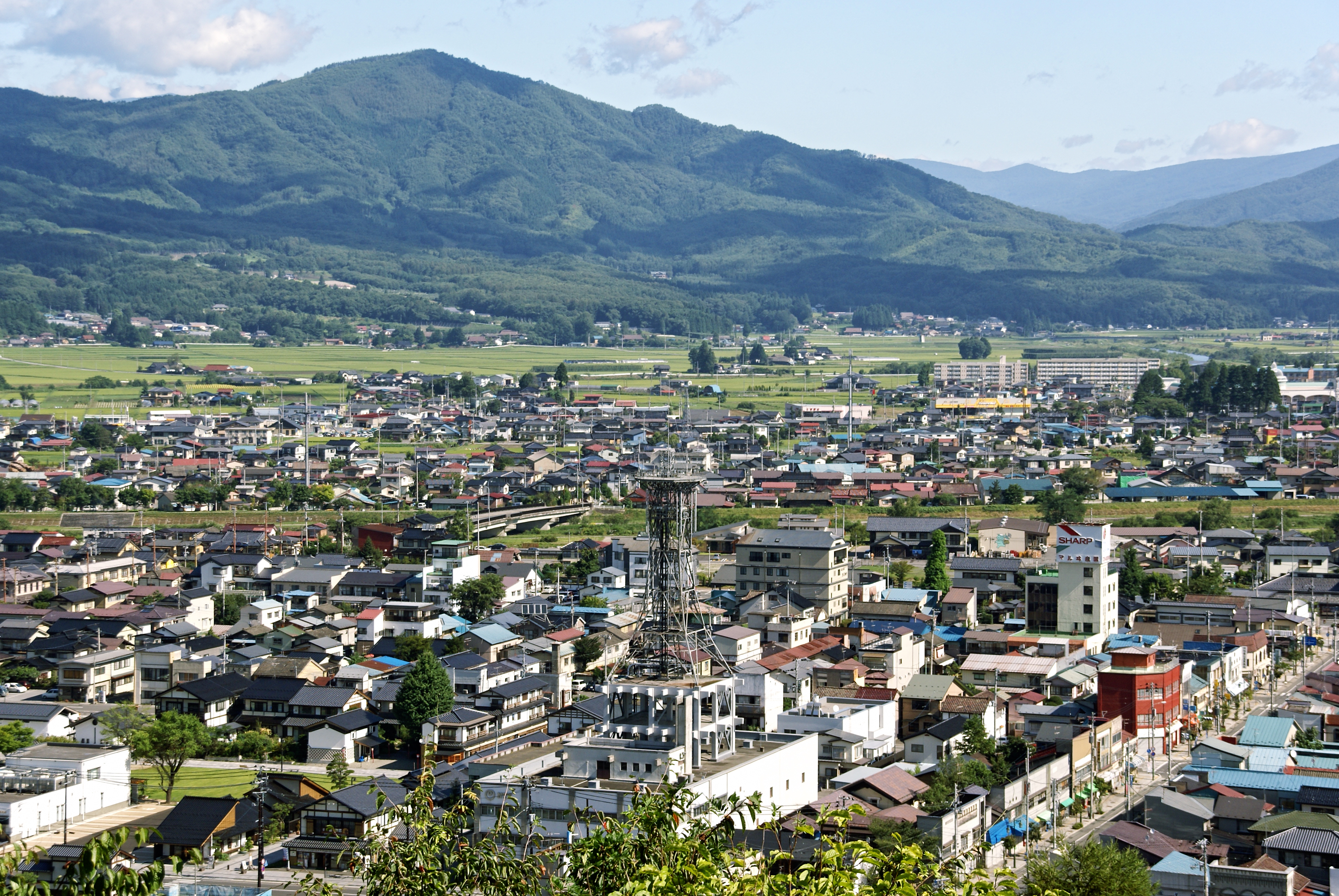
View from the castle ruins

== See also ==
- List of Historic Sites of Japan (Iwate)

== Literature ==
- Benesch, Oleg and Ran Zwigenberg (2019). Japan's Castles: Citadels of Modernity in War and Peace. Cambridge: Cambridge University Press. p. 374. ISBN 9781108481946.
- De Lange, William (2021). An Encyclopedia of Japanese Castles. Groningen: Toyo Press. pp. 600 pages. ISBN 978-9492722300.
