= Kuroyama Pit Dwelling Site =

Heian period archaeological site in Kunohe, Iwate, Japan

- 黒山の昔穴遺跡 (Japanese)
- Kuroyama Pit Dwelling Site Kuroyama Pit Dwelling Site (Japan)
- Interactive map of Kuroyama Pit Dwelling Site
- 40°14′14″N 141°23′27″E
- Type: settlement
- Periods: Heian period
- Location: Kunohe, Iwate, Japan
- Region: Tōhoku region

Site notes
- Elevation: 270 m (890 ft)
- Area: 37,468.8 m^{2} (403,311 sq ft)
- Excavation dates: 2002-2005
- Public access: No facilities

Kuroyama Pit Dwelling Site (黒山の昔穴遺跡, Kuroyama no mukashi ana iseki) is an archaeological site with the ruins of a late Heian period settlement in what is now part of the village of Kunohe, Iwate in the Tōhoku region of northern Japan. It has been protected by the central government as a National Historic Site since 2024.

== Overview ==
The Kuroyama ruins are located at an elevation of approximately 430 meters, directly below Mount Orizume. A distinctive feature of the site is that the remains of pit dwellings and other structures dating back over 1,000 years remain unfilled, forming depressions. Because many similar pits remain scattered throughout the area, locals refer to them as "Kuroyama's Old Holes," meaning "holes where people once lived," and this name has since become the site's name. Approximately 40 depressions have been identified, of which approximately 30 are believed to be dwelling sites. Research conducted since 2016 has revealed two similar depressions on the south side of the designated site, separated by a stream, raising the possibility that the site may extend further.

Archaeological excavations into the depressions have been conducted by Fukushima University for three years since 2002. Among the largest, Pit No. 39, located at the highest point, is the largest, measuring seven meters in diameter, and remains of a hearth have been found along with post holes. Excavations have unearthed Haji ware and Sue ware pottery, as well as iron products such as knives and arrowheads. The settlement is thought to date mainly to the second half of the 10th century, and pottery excavated from the remains of pit dwellings shows the same appearance, suggesting that the at least 22 pit dwellings all date to the same period. Among the Sue ware pieces was a large jar over 70-cm tall, which is on display on the second floor of the Kunohe Village Community Center.

The site is approximately 13 kilometers east of JR East Tōhoku Shinkansen Ninohe Station and Iwate Ginga Railway Company

== See also ==
- List of Historic Sites of Japan (Iwate)
