= Honederamura Shōen =

Archeological Site

- 骨寺村荘園遺跡 (Japanese)
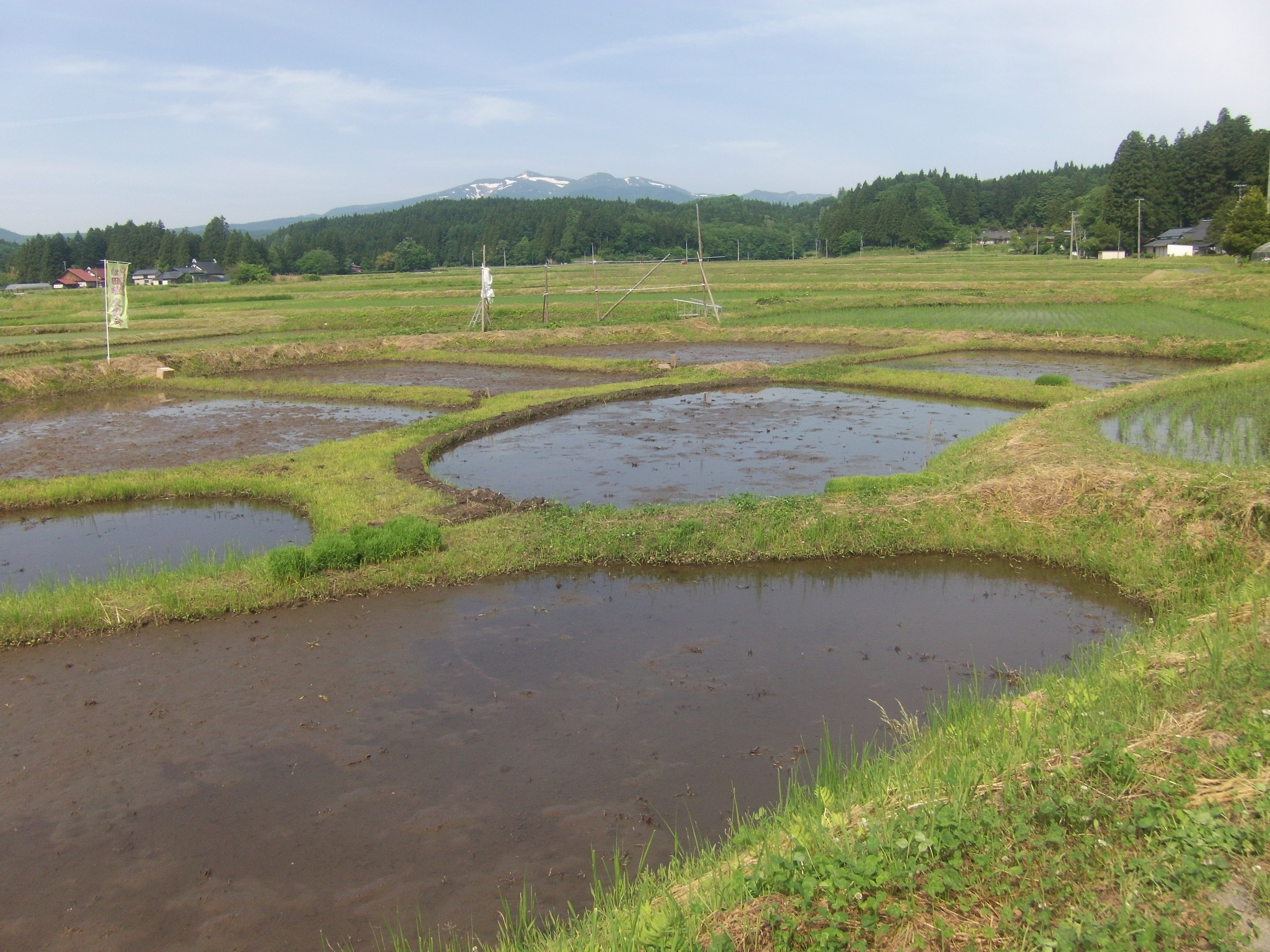
- Honederamura Shōen ruins

- Location in Japan Honederamura Shōen (Japan)
- 38°58′54″N 140°57′06″E
- Type: settlement
- Periods: Kamakura period
- Location: Ichinoseki, Iwate, Japan
- Region: Tōhoku region

Site notes
- Elevation: 110 m (360 ft)
- Area: 48.8 ha (121 acres)
- Public access: Yes

Honederamura Shōen ruins (骨寺村荘園遺跡, Honederamura Shōen iseki) is an archaeological site containing the ruins of a large-scale shōen manor from the Kamakura period, located in what is now part of the city of Ichinoseki, Iwate in the Tōhoku region of Japan. A portion of the site (48.8 hectares) was designated a National Historic Site of Japan in 2005.

== Overview ==
The Honederamura Shōen ruins are located in the Genbi neighborhood of Ichinoseki City on a terraced plain on the left bank of the Iwai River east from Mount Kurikoma. The plain is surrounded by low mountains with heights of around 300 meters, and is a well-watered area with natural springs and the Honedera River flowing eastward through the plain to the Iwai River. The shōen dates from the late Heian period and was originally a donation by the monk Jizaibō Renkō to provide for the upkeep of the Kyōzō sutra repository at Chūson-ji in Hiraizumi. It as administered by a bettō from Chuzon-ji, an arrangement with continued after Minamoto no Yoritomo defeated of the Northern Fujiwara clan and redrew the borders of the shōen. Under the Edo period Tokugawa shogunate, the estate came under the control of the Date clan of Sendai Domain.

Chūson-ji has preserved two illustrated maps of Honederamura Shōen drawn in the Kamakura period, which indicate that the landscape is almost unchanged since that time. The estate is also mentioned in the Kamakura period chronicle Azuma Kagami.

In addition to a portion being designated as a National Historic Site, the rice paddies, residences and surrounding land of 761 hectares (approximately 7 kilometers east–west by 2 kilometers north–south) is designated as a “landscape planning area” in accordance with the Landscape Act, and the central portion of 366 hectares has been designated an Important cultural landscape under the Cultural Properties Protection Act.

== See also ==
- List of Historic Sites of Japan (Iwate)
