= Sanriku, Iwate =

Sanriku 三陸町
- Former municipality
- Flag Emblem

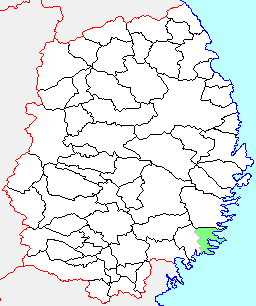
- Location of Sanriku in Iwate Prefecture

- Location in Japan
- Coordinates: 39°07′13″N 141°48′48″E
- Country: Japan
- Region: Tōhoku
- Prefecture: Iwate Prefecture
- District: Kesen District
- Merged: November 15, 2001 (now part of Ōfunato)

Area
  - Total: 137.13 km^{2} (52.95 sq mi)

Population (October 31, 2001)
  - Total: 8,322
  - Density: 60.69/km^{2} (157.2/sq mi)
- Time zone: UTC+09:00 (JST)
- Symbols
- Bird: Common gull
- Flower: Camellia japonica
- Tree: Cryptomeria

Sanriku (Japanese: 三陸町, Hepburn: Sanriku-cho) was a town located in Kesen District, Iwate Prefecture, Japan, now part of Ōfunato, Iwate.

== History ==
The village of Sanriku was created on September 30, 1956, with the merger of the villages of Yoshihama, Okirai and Ryori, all from Kesen District.

On November 15, 2001, Sanriku was merged into the expanded city of Ōfunato and no longer exists as an independent municipality.

As of September 30, 2005, the town had an estimated population of 8,322 and a population density of 60.69 persons per km^{2}. The total area was 137.13 km^{2}.
