= Shimofunato Shell Mound =

Shimofunato Shell Midden
- 下船渡貝塚 (Japanese)
- Shimofunato Shell Midden Shimofunato Shell Mound (Japan)
- 39°02′16″N 141°43′09″E
- Type: shell midden
- Periods: Jōmon period
- Location: Ōfunato, Iwate, Japan
- Region: Tōhoku region

Site notes
- Elevation: 30 m (98 ft)
- Area: 9,300 m^{2} (100,000 sq ft)
- Excavation dates: 1924-1925, 1961
- Public access: Yes

Shimofunato Shell Midden (下船渡貝塚, Shimofunato kaizuka) is an archaeological site consisting of a shell midden and the remains of an adjacent settlement dating from the Jōmon period, located in what is now the city of Ōfunato, Iwate Prefecture in the Tōhoku region of northern Japan. It has been protected by the central government as a National Historic Site since 1934.

== Overview ==
During the early to middle Jōmon period (approximately 4000 to 2500 BC), sea levels were five to six meters higher than at present, and the ambient temperature was also 2 deg C higher. During this period, the Tōhoku region was inhabited by the Jōmon people, many of whom lived in coastal settlements. The middens associated with such settlements contain bone, botanical material, mollusc shells, sherds, lithics, and other artifacts and ecofacts associated with the now-vanished inhabitants, and these features, provide a useful source into the diets and habits of Jōmon society. Most of these middens are found along the Pacific coast of Japan. The rocky ria coast of Iwate Prefecture was densely settled from the early through late Jōmon period, and the locations of such coastal settlements are often marked by shell middens containing the remains of shellfish, fish, animal and whale bones and human-produced artifacts, including earthenware shards, fishing hooks, etc.

The rocky rias coast of Iwate Prefecture was densely settled from the early through late Jōmon period (4000–1000 BC). In particular, the deeply indented Ōfunato Bay area was a rich fishing ground and is the location of 16 known Jōmon-period shell middens, a number of which have been designated National Historic Sites.The Shimofunato Shell Midden dates from the late Jōmon period, and is located at an elevation of between 20 and 30 meters above the present sea level, on the west side of Ōfunato Bay.

The midden, which has a thickness of between 0.6 and 1.2 meters, was first excavated between 1924-1925 and again in 1961, and many artifacts were recovered, including clay dogū, 220 stone tools, deer antler bones, and large quantities of pottery shards. The remains of two adult humans and one child and one dog were also found. The site, which is located on private property, was backfilled after excavation and there is now nothing at site but an explanatory plaque. The site is located approximately seven minutes on foot from the JR East Shimofunato Station. Many of the recovered artifacts are on display at the Ōfunato City Museum

== See also ==
- List of Historic Sites of Japan (Iwate)
