= Nakazawahama Shell Mound =

Nakazawahama Shell Midden
- 中沢浜貝塚 (Japanese)
- Location in Japan Nakazawahama Shell Mound (Japan)
- 38°57′18″N 141°41′50″E
- Type: shell midden
- Periods: Jōmon period
- Location: Rikuzentakata, Iwate, Japan
- Region: Tōhoku region

Site notes
- Elevation: 20 m (66 ft)
- Excavation dates: 1907-1908, 1924, 1984-1988
- Management: (private land)
- Public access: Yes

Nakazawahama Shell Midden (中沢浜貝塚, Nakazawahama Kaizuka) is an archaeological site consisting of a Jōmon period shell midden and the remains of an adjacent settlement located in what is now the city of Rikuzentakata, Iwate Prefecture in the Tōhoku region of northern Japan. It has been protected by the central government as a National Historic Site since 1934.

== Overview ==
During the early to middle Jōmon period (approximately 4000 to 2500 BC), sea levels were five to six meters higher than at present, and the ambient temperature was also 2 deg C higher. During this period, the Tōhoku region was inhabited by the Jōmon people, many of whom lived in coastal settlements. The middens associated with such settlements contain bone, botanical material, mollusc shells, sherds, lithics, and other artifacts and ecofacts associated with the now-vanished inhabitants, and these features, provide a useful source into the diets and habits of Jōmon society. Most of these middens are found along the Pacific coast of Japan. The rocky ria coast of Iwate Prefecture was densely settled from the early through late Jōmon period, and the locations of such coastal settlements are often marked by shell middens containing the remains of shellfish, fish, animal and whale bones and human-produced artifacts, including earthenware shards, fishing hooks, etc.

The rocky ria coast of Iwate Prefecture was densely settled from the early through late Jōmon period, and the locations of such coastal settlements are often marked by shell middens containing shellfish, fish, animal and whale bones and human-produced artifacts, including earthenware shards, fishing hooks, etc. The Nakzawahama Shell Midden is located near the tip of Hirota Peninsula at the western slope of Omoriyama mountain, at an elevation of between five and twenty meters from the present-day coastline. A preliminary survey was conducted in 1907-1908, at which time 23 sets of human remains were also discovered. A more comprehensive excavation was conducted in 1924; however the site did not receive protection until it was designated as a national historic site in 1934.

Artifacts discovered include earthenware, stoneware, animal bone ware and jar coffins from the early to late Jōmon period through the Yayoi period. Further excavation conducted by Rikuzentakata City Board of Education in 1984, 1986, and 1988, uncovered a total of 18 more human skeletons, one of which had a shell arming still attached, and a number of deep bowls containing the remains of infant, with amber ball decorations. The site is located by bus from Otomo Station on the JR East Ōfunato Line.

== See also ==
- List of Historic Sites of Japan (Iwate)
