= Yakata Site =

Archaeological site in Kamaishi, Iwate, Japan

- 屋形遺跡 (Japanese)
- Location in Japan Yakata Site (Japan)
- Interactive map of Yakata Site
- 39°10′54″N 141°53′43″E
- Type: settlement, shell midden
- Periods: Jōmon period
- Location: Kamaishi, Iwate, Japan
- Region: Tōhoku region

Site notes
- Elevation: 20 m (66 ft)
- Excavation dates: 2015-2021
- Management: (private land)
- Public access: Yes

Yakata Site (屋形遺跡, Yakata iseki) is an archaeological site consisting of a end of the Middle to early Late Jōmon period (approximately 4,000 to 3,800 years ago) settlement site with accompanying shell midden located in what is now the Tōni neighborhood of the city of Kamaishi, Iwate Prefecture in the Tōhoku region of northern Japan. It has been protected by the central government as a National Historic Site since 2021.

== Overview ==
During the early to middle Jōmon period (approximately 4000 to 2500 BC), sea levels were five to six meters higher than at present, and the ambient temperature was also 2 deg C higher. During this period, the Tōhoku region was inhabited by the Jōmon people, many of whom lived in coastal settlements. The middens associated with such settlements contain bone, botanical material, mollusc shells, sherds, lithics, and other artifacts and ecofacts associated with the now-vanished inhabitants, and these features, provide a useful source into the diets and habits of Jōmon society. Most of these middens are found along the Pacific coast of Japan. The rocky ria coast of Iwate Prefecture was densely settled from the early through late Jōmon period, and the locations of such coastal settlements are often marked by shell middens containing the remains of shellfish, fish, animal and whale bones and human-produced artifacts, including earthenware shards, fishing hooks, etc.

The rocky ria coast of Iwate Prefecture was densely settled from the early through late Jōmon period, and the locations of such coastal settlements are often marked by shell middens containing shellfish, fish, animal and whale bones and human-produced artifacts, including earthenware shards, fishing hooks, etc. The Yakata Shell Midden is located on a coastal terrace at an elevation of 26–30 meters and was discovered in 2015 during construction work on an evacuation route to higher ground in preparation for a tsunami. It was designated a city historic site in 2018, and elevated to a national site in 2021. Currently the ruins have been backfilled for preservation and as the site is on private property, public access is limited.

Artifacts discovered include Jōmon pottery, stone arrowheads, stone axes, and earrings, clay figurines, bone and horn tools (such as fishhooks and spatulas) as well as shell and animal bones.

The Yakata Site is approximately 7.4 kilometers southeast of Tōni Station on the Sanriku Railway.

== See also ==
- List of Historic Sites of Japan (Iwate)
