= Takonoura Shell Mound =

Takonoura shell midden
- 蛸ノ浦貝塚 (Japanese)
- Takonoura shell midden Takonoura Shell Mound (Japan)
- 39°02′08″N 141°44′23″E
- Type: shell midden
- Periods: Jōmon period
- Location: Ōfunato, Iwate, Japan
- Region: Tōhoku region

Site notes
- Elevation: 31 m (102 ft)
- Excavation dates: 1957
- Archaeologists: Waseda University
- Public access: Yes

Takonoura shell midden (蛸ノ浦貝塚, Takonoura kaizuka) is an archaeological site consisting of a Jōmon period shell midden and the remains of an adjacent settlement located in what is now the city of Ōfunato, Iwate Prefecture in the Tōhoku region of northern Japan. It has been protected by the central government as a National Historic Site since 1934.

== Overview ==
During the early to middle Jōmon period (approximately 4000 to 2500 BC), sea levels were five to six meters higher than at present, and the ambient temperature was also 2 deg C higher. During this period, the Tōhoku region was inhabited by the Jōmon people, many of whom lived in coastal settlements. The middens associated with such settlements contain bone, botanical material, mollusc shells, sherds, lithics, and other artifacts and ecofacts associated with the now-vanished inhabitants, and these features, provide a useful source into the diets and habits of Jōmon society. Most of these middens are found along the Pacific coast of Japan. The rocky ria coast of Iwate Prefecture was densely settled from the early through late Jōmon period, and the locations of such coastal settlements are often marked by shell middens containing the remains of shellfish, fish, animal and whale bones and human-produced artifacts, including earthenware shards, fishing hooks, etc.

The rocky rias coast of Iwate Prefecture was densely settled from the early through late Jōmon period. In particular, the deeply indented Ōfunato Bay area was a rich fishing ground and is the location of 16 known Jōmon -period shell middens, a number of which have been designated National Historic Sites. The Takonoura shell midden dates from the early to middle Jōmon period, and is located on a hill on the east side of the Ōfunato Bay in the Ashinozaki, Anozaki-cho neighborhood.

It was partially excavated in 1957 by Waseda University. The midden is annular, forming a shell ring, but truncated to the east and southwest, and has a thickness of over two meters, indicating that it had been used for many centuries. An unusual feature of the midden is that some layers consist almost exclusively of a certain type of artifact (for example, only oyster shells, or only fish bones, etc). However, in general, the midden has a typically mixed composition including many varieties of shellfish, fish bones, and the bones of mammals such as dogs, Sitka deer, whales, wolves and dolphins. In addition, stone axes, weights, and carved bone objects, such as fishhooks, and bone jewelry have been found. The site also contains traces of dwelling foundations and eight sets of human remains.

The site was backfilled after excavation, and there is now little above ground except for an explanatory plaque. The site is located approximately fifteen minutes by car from Rikuzen-Akasaki Station on the Sanriku Railway Rias Line.

== See also ==
- List of Historic Sites of Japan (Iwate)
