= Yoshinobu Fujiwara =

Japanese politician

- 藤原 良信

Member of the House of Councillors
- In office 29 July 2007 – 28 July 2013
- Constituency: National PR

Member of the Iwate Prefectural Assembly
- In office 1987–2007
- Constituency: Ōfunato City

Personal details
- Born: 13 August 1951 (age 75) Ōfunato, Iwate, Japan
- Party: Independent (since 2013)
- Other political affiliations: LDP (1987–1993); JRP (1993–1994); NFP (1994–1998); LP (1998–2003); DPJ (2003–2012); PLF (2012); TPJ (2012–2013)
- Education: Nihon University

Yoshinobu Fujiwara (藤原 良信, Fujiwara Yoshinobu; born 1951) is a former Japanese politician of the Democratic Party of Japan, who served as a member of the House of Councillors in the Diet (national legislature). A native of Ōfunato, Iwate and graduate of Nihon University, he was elected to the House of Councillors for the first time in 2007 after serving in the Iwate Prefectural Assembly for five terms since 1987.
