= Ezuriko Kofun Cluster =

Group of burial mounds in northern Japan

Ezuriko Kofun group
- 江釣子古墳群 (Japanese)
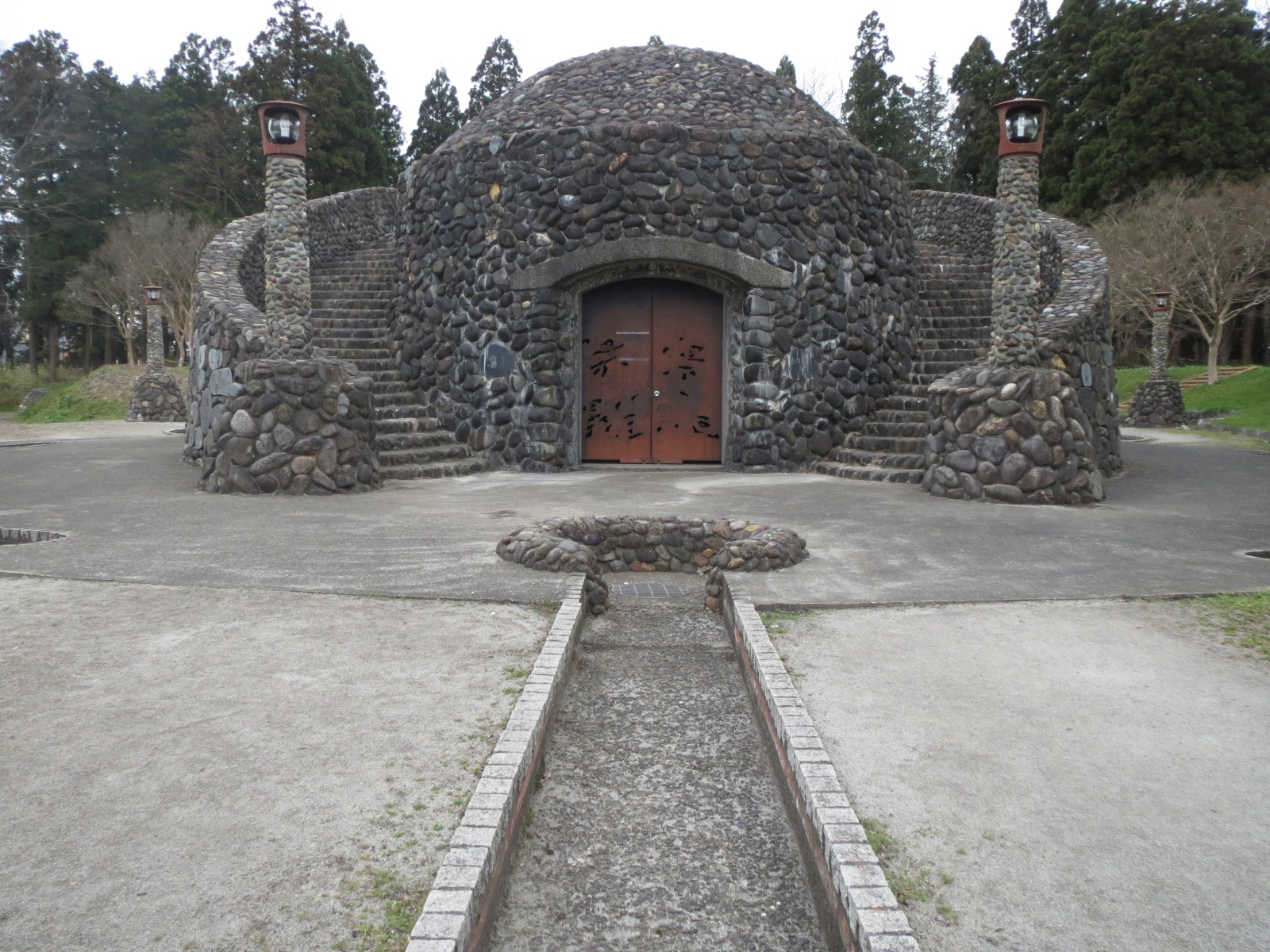
- Ezuriko Kofun Park

- Ezuriko Kofun Cluster Ezuriko Kofun Cluster (Japan)
- 39°17′29″N 141°04′56″E
- Type: kofun group
- Periods: Kofun period
- Location: Kitakami, Iwate, Japan
- Region: Tōhoku region

History
- Built: 7th to 8th century AD

Site notes
- Elevation: 70 m (230 ft)
- Excavation dates: 1954, 1965
- Archaeologists: Waseda University, Tōhoku University
- Public access: Yes (Museum and park)

Ezuriko Kofun group (江釣子古墳群, Ezuriko kofun-gun) is a group of four separate sets of late Kofun period burial mounds in the city of Kitakami, Iwate, in the Tōhoku region of northern Japan. The tombs have been collectively designated a National Historic Site in 1979, with the area under designation expanded in 1980.

== Overview ==
Located on a river terrace near the confluence of the Waga River with the Kitakami River at an altitude of 70 to 90 meters, the site consists of the Nekoyazu and Naganuma sites (29 tombs), Gojōmaru site (81 tombs), and Yahata site (23 tombs), with a total of some 120 burial mounds. All of kofun are dome-shaped, with a diameter of 4.5 to 16 meters and an average height of 0.4 to 0.7 meters. Archaeological excavations were conducted in 1954 by Waseda University on a portion of the site, and identified the kofun as being from the late 7th through early 8th centuries. Further investigation was performed by Tōhoku University in 1965. The kofun contained stone burial chambers made from piled rounded river stones, the largest of which was five meters in length, with a central trench to hold the sarcophagus. In the Gojōmaru district, one tomb was found to contain four chambers. Grave goods included remnants of bladed instruments (swords, daggers, agricultural implements), jewelry (magatama beads, cylindrical beads, glass beads, etc.), horse fittings, and shards of earthenware pottery. An excavation in 1972 confirmed that the kofun in the Naganuma site were part of the same cluster, and the National Historic Site designation was modified in 1980 to include this group.

The site is located a three-minute walk from the "Gojo Maru" bus stop on Iwateken Kotsu Bus from Kitakami Station on the Tohoku Shinkansen.

== See also ==
- List of Historic Sites of Japan (Iwate)
