= Kabayama Site =

Kabayama ruins
- 樺山遺跡 (Japanese)
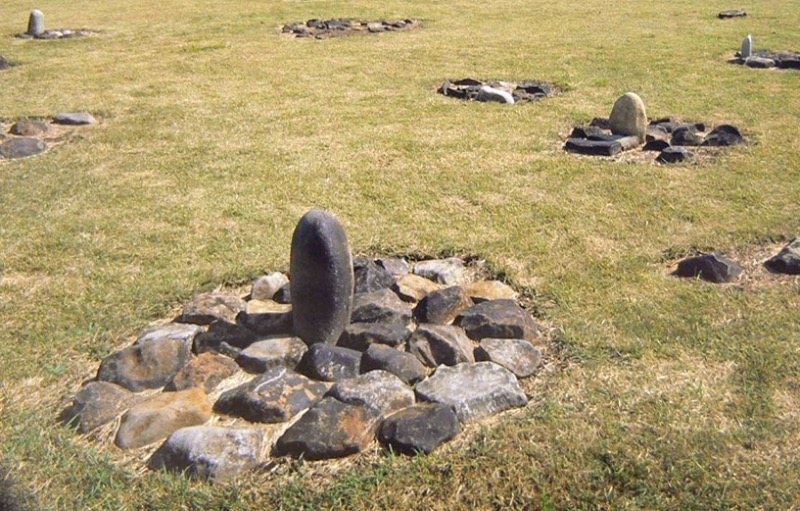
- Stone Circles at Kabayama ruins

- Kabayama ruins Kabayama Site (Japan)
- 39°14′21″N 141°07′48″E
- Type: settlement, stone circles
- Periods: Jōmon period
- Location: Kitakami, Iwate, Japan
- Region: Tōhoku region

Site notes
- Elevation: 80 m (260 ft)
- Public access: Yes (archaeological park)

Kabayama ruins (樺山遺跡, Kabayama Iseki) is an archaeological site consisting of a Jōmon period settlement and possible ceremonial center located in the Inase neighborhood of Kitakami, Iwate, in the Tōhoku region of northern Japan. It has been designated as a National Historic Site since 1977.

== Overview ==
The Kabayama site is located approximately seven kilometers south of the center of the modern city of Kitakami, on the Kitakami River near the foot of the Kitakami Mountains at an altitude of 80–10 meters. The site was discovered in 1945 and has been excavated numerous times.

The site is located on two levels of a low hill. The lower tier consists of 32 circular arrangements of elongated river stones in a radial pattern, each with a diameter of 1.2 meters, some with a central dolmen. Dating from the middle Jōmon period, others may have been destroyed or relocated. As the soil underneath these stones is undisturbed, these are not burial markers, and the formations are too small to serve as a defensive perimeter. It is thought that these stones had a ceremonial meaning, similar to stone circles found at other Jōmon period sites, such as at the Ōyu Stone Circles discovered in Akita Prefecture.

The upper level is located 20 meters higher, and consists of the remains of over 30 pit dwellings. Pottery shards and fragments of earthenware jar coffins were found in the upper level, and have been dated to 5000 years ago for the eastern side of the hill, and 4000 years ago on the western side, indicating a long period of settlement. Other artifacts included clay figurines, earrings, and earthenware with stamped decorations, and stone products such as stone axes, weights, and jewelry.

The site is open to the public as an archaeological park and contains a number of reconstructed pit dwellings, and a small museum.

== See also ==
- List of Historic Sites of Japan (Iwate)
