= Tsunozuka Kofun =

Burial mound

- 角塚古墳 (Japanese)
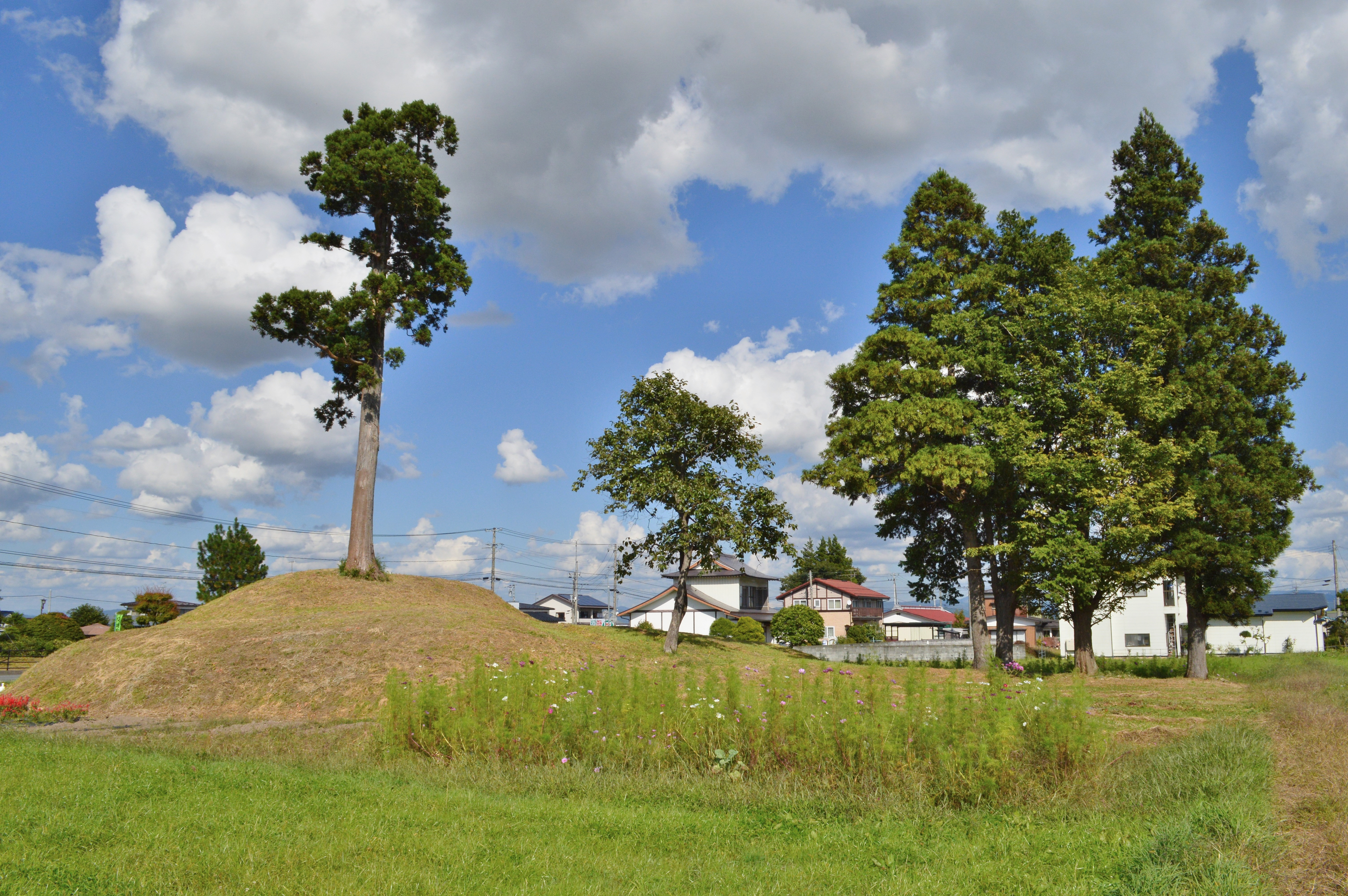
- Tsunozuka Kofun

- Tsunozuka Kofun Tsunozuka Kofun (Japan)
- 39°08′29″N 141°05′37″E
- Type: kofun
- Periods: Kofun period
- Location: Ōshū, Iwate, Japan
- Region: Tōhoku region

History
- Built: late 5th or early 6th century AD

Site notes
- Excavation dates: 1935, 1945, 1947, 1974-75
- Public access: Yes

Tsunozuka Kofun (角塚古墳) is a keyhole-shaped kofun burial mound located in the Isawa neighborhood of the city of Ōshū, Iwate in the Tōhoku region of northern Japan. It is significant in that it is the northernmost keyhole-shaped kofun yet discovered, and indicates the penetration of Kofun period culture into lands traditionally considered part of the Emishi cultural zone.

== Overview ==
The Tsunozuka Kofun is located in the southern portion of the Kitakami Basin of the Kitakami River on the alluvial fan of the Isawa River. The tomb does not appear in any historical records and the name or rank of the person buried within is unknown. From the style of the mound and grave goods uncovered within, archaeologists have dated the kofun to the late 5th or early 6th century AD.

The kofun was excavated in 1935 and 1945, during which time a number of haniwa in the shapes of animals, people and buildings were discovered. However, it was not until 1947 that archaeologists confirmed that the structure was that of a keyhole-shaped kofun (前方後円墳, zenpō-kōen-fun). The site received protection as an Iwate Prefectural Historic Site in 1957. During further excavations held from 1974-1975, more haniwa and the fukiishi stones which originally covered the tomb were uncovered. The site received further protection as a National Historic Site in 1985.

- Total length: 43–45 meters
- Circular Portion: 2-tier, 28 meter diameter x 4 meter height
- Keyway Portion: 10 meter width in the north, tapering out to 15 meters in the south, 1.5 meter height

The site is about 15 minutes by car from JR East Tōhoku Main Line Mizusawa-Esashi Station.The artifacts uncovered in excavations are preserved at the Isawa Local History Museum.

== See also ==
- List of Historic Sites of Japan (Iwate)
