= Yubunezawa Stone Circle =

Archaeological site in Takizawa, Iwate, Japan

- 湯舟沢環状列石 (Japanese)
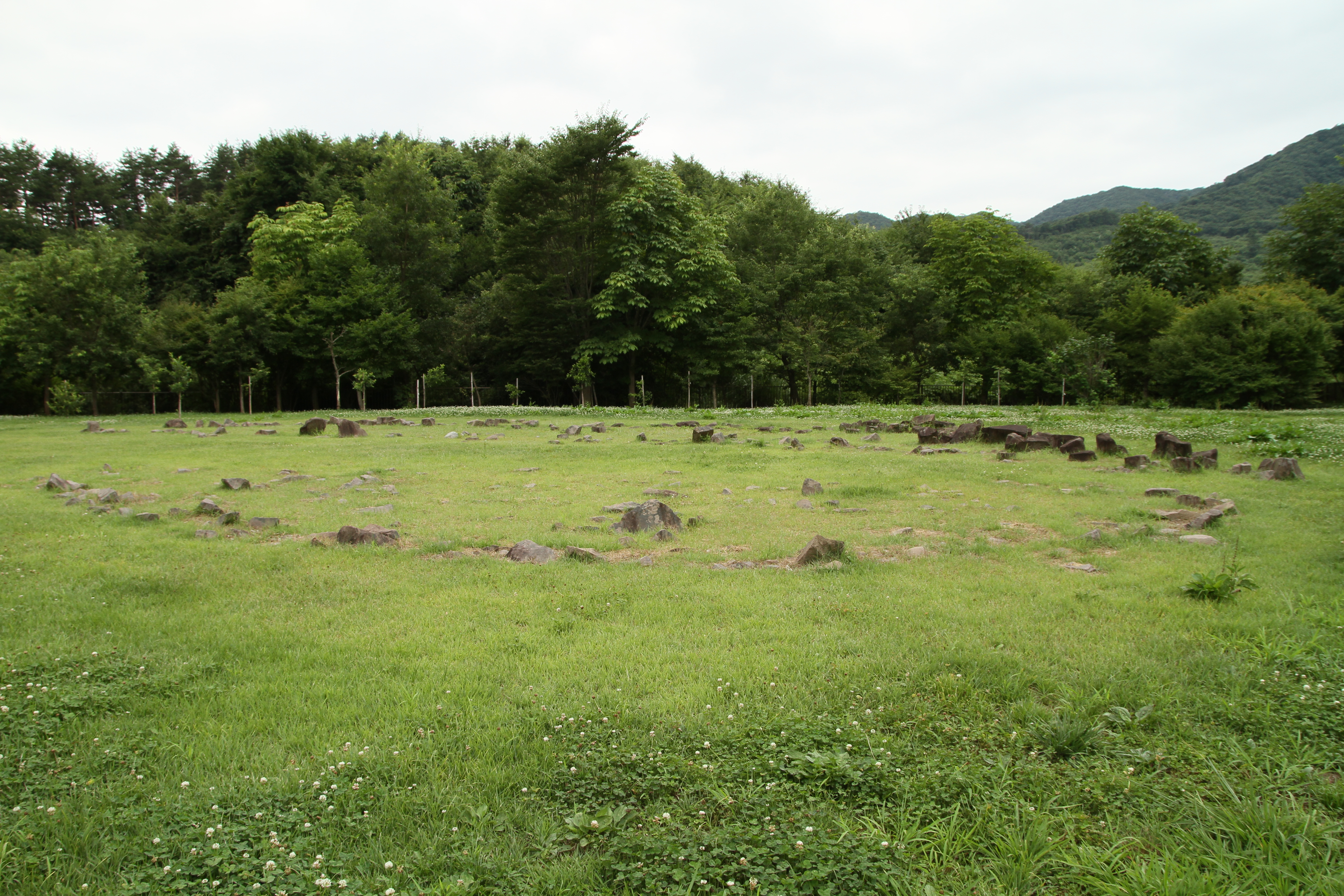
- Yubunezawa Stone Circle

- Location within Iwate Prefecture Location within Japan
- Interactive map of Yubunezawa Stone Circle
- 39°46′52″N 141°05′51″E
- Periods: Jōmon period
- Location: Takizawa, Iwate, Japan
- Region: Tōhoku region

Site notes
- Diameter: 20 by 15 metres (66 by 49 ft)
- Discovered: 2 May 1990
- Public access: Yes (Yubunezawa Stone Circle Historical Park)

Yubunezawa Stone Circle (湯舟沢環状列石, Yubunezawa kanjō resseki) is an archaeological site with the remains of a Late Jōmon (c. 4000 BP) stone circle in what is now the city of Takizawa, Iwate Prefecture, Japan. The site was designated a Prefectural Historic Site in 2013.

== Overview ==
The stone circle was discovered in 1990 during construction-related survey and excavation in what was then the village of Takizawa. Extending some 20 metres (66 ft) north to south by 15 metres (49 ft) east to west, the circle comprises a number of variously shaped groups of stones. Scientific analysis of the numerous man-made holes beneath the stones indicates that this was a communal burial and ritual site, facing Mount Yaji (528 metres (1,732 ft)). While there were further graves without a stone marker, the absence of postholes or other evidence for dwellings in the circle's vicinity demonstrates the distinction and separation of spaces for living from those for burial and spirituality. A pathway for transporting stones to the site was also found, along with ceramics and lithics.

The same summer that the stone circle was discovered, the village decided to preserve the site and make the land public. Since 1998, it has been open to the public as an historical park, complemented by the exhibition room at the adjacent Takizawa City Buried Cultural Properties Center. The original remains are preserved beneath the surface, as when found, while the circle has been reconstituted with 823 stones. The surrounding area has been landscaped with plants in keeping with those of Jōmon times.

== See also ==
- Jōmon Prehistoric Sites in Northern Japan
- List of Historic Sites of Japan (Iwate)
- Iwate Prefectural Museum
- Scenic areas of Ihatov
