= Ayaorishinden Site =

Ruins of a Jōmon period settlement in Tōno, Japan

- 綾織新田遺跡 (Japanese)
- Ayaorishinden Site Ayaorishinden Site (Japan)
- 39°19′01″N 141°17′56″E
- Type: settlement
- Periods: Jōmon period
- Location: Tōno, Iwate, Japan
- Region: Tōhoku region

History
- Built: 4000 BC

Site notes
- Elevation: 270 m (890 ft)
- Public access: Yes

Ayaorishinden ruins (綾織新田遺跡, Ayaorishinden iseki) is an archaeological site containing the remains of a large early Jōmon period settlement located in the city of Tōno, in Iwate Prefecture in the far northern Tōhoku region of Japan. It has been designated by the central government as a National Historic Site since 2002.

== Overview ==
The Ayaorishinden ruins are located on a river terrace of on a branch of the Kitakami River in the Tōno Basin, at an altitude of approximately 270 meters and were discovered when the site was surveyed in preparation for development into an industrial park. The Tōno City Board of Education conducted exploratory surveys in 1997, and the site came under city protection in 2000.

The settlement consisted of 17 large pit houses, wells, and roads, with the houses arranged around a central square. Each house had a width of 4 to 6 meters, and a length of 8 to 14 meters, and the presence of multiple hearths seem to indicate that these were used by multiple family groups. A cemetery pit in the south end of the settlement yielded 50 earrings made of stone and bone, thought to have been produced from the Sea of Japan region of Japan.

The site was backfilled after excavation and is now an empty field with an explanatory placard. The site is located approximately 50 minutes on foot from Ayaori Station on the JR East Kamaishi Line.

== See also ==
- List of Historic Sites of Japan (Iwate)
