= Murasakino Station =

Railway station in Kitakami, Iwate Prefecture, Japan

Murasakino Station 村崎野駅
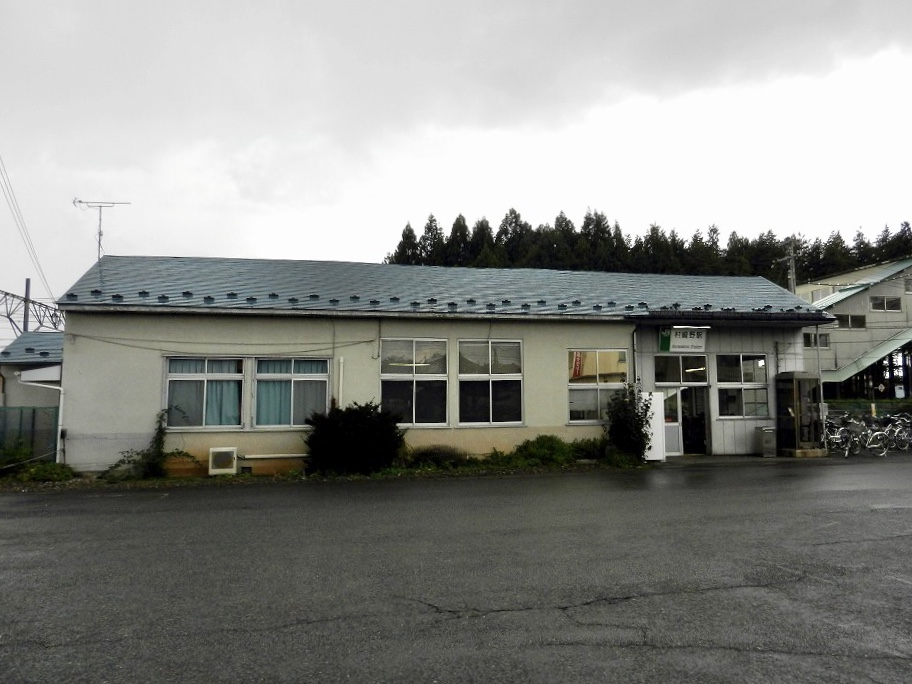
- Murasakino Station, October 2011

General information
- Location: Murasakino 15 Jiwari 513, Kitakami-shi, Iwate-ken 024-0004; Japan
- Coordinates: 39.3231°N 141.1204°E
- Operator: JR East
- Line: ■ Tōhoku Main Line
- Distance: 492.2 km from Tokyo
- Platforms: 2 side platforms
- Tracks: 2

Construction
- Structure type: At grade

Other information
- Status: Staffed
- Website: Official website

History
- Opened: 1 November 1950

Passengers
- FY2016: 986 (daily)

Services
| Preceding station | JR East | Following station |
|---|---|---|
| Kitakami towards Kuroiso | Tōhoku Main Line Local | Hanamaki towards Morioka |
Location
- Location within Iwate Prefecture Location within Japan

Murasakino Station (村崎野駅, Murasakino-eki) is a railway station in the city of Kitakami, Iwate Prefecture, Japan, operated by East Japan Railway Company (JR East).

== Lines ==
Murasakino Station is served by the Tōhoku Main Line, and is located 492.2 rail kilometers from the terminus of the line at Tokyo Station.

== Station layout ==
The station has two opposed side platform connected to the station building by a footbridge. The station is staffed on consignment by Jaster Co., Ltd. Ordinary tickets, express tickets, and reserved-seat tickets for all JR lines are on sale.

=== Platforms ===
| 1 | ■ Tōhoku Main Line | for Kitakami and Morioka |
| 2 | ■ Tōhoku Main Line | for Mizusawa and Ichinoseki |

== History ==
Murasakino Station was established as a signal stop on 5 March 1919, and was elevated to a passenger station on 1 November 1950. The station was absorbed into the JR East network upon the privatization of the Japanese National Railways (JNR) on 1 April 1987.

== Passenger statistics ==
In fiscal 2018, the station was used by an average of 986 passengers daily (boarding passengers only).

== Surrounding area ==
- Kitakami River
- National Route 4

== See also ==
- List of railway stations in Japan
