= Japan National Route 397 =

Road in Japan

National Route 397
- 国道397号
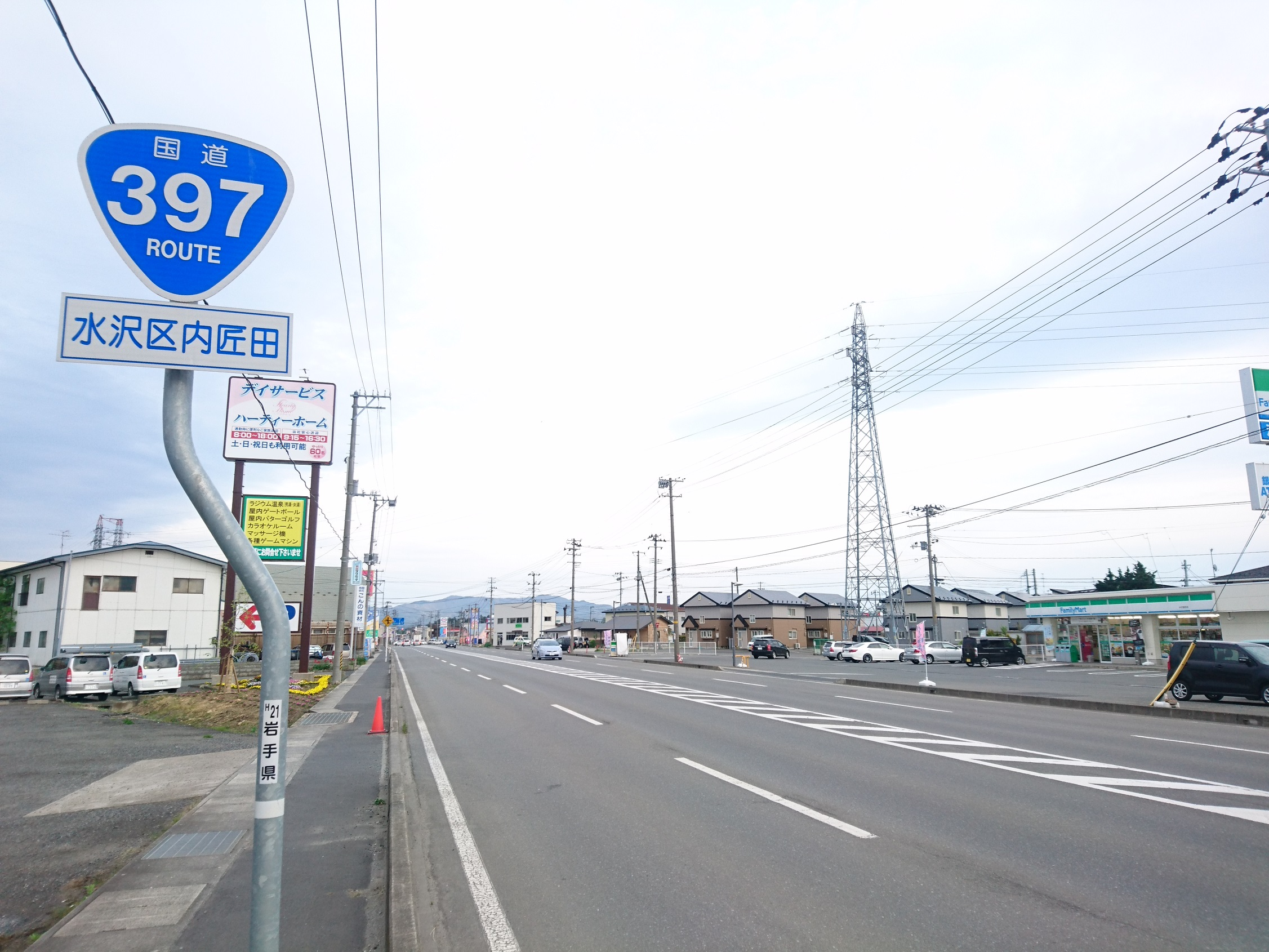

Route information
- Length: 137.8 km (85.6 mi)

Location
- Country: Japan

Highway system
- National highways of Japan; Expressways of Japan
← National Route 396	→ National Route 398

National Route 397 is a national highway of Japan connecting Ōfunato, Iwate and Yokote, Akita in Japan, with a total length of 137.8 km (85.62 mi).

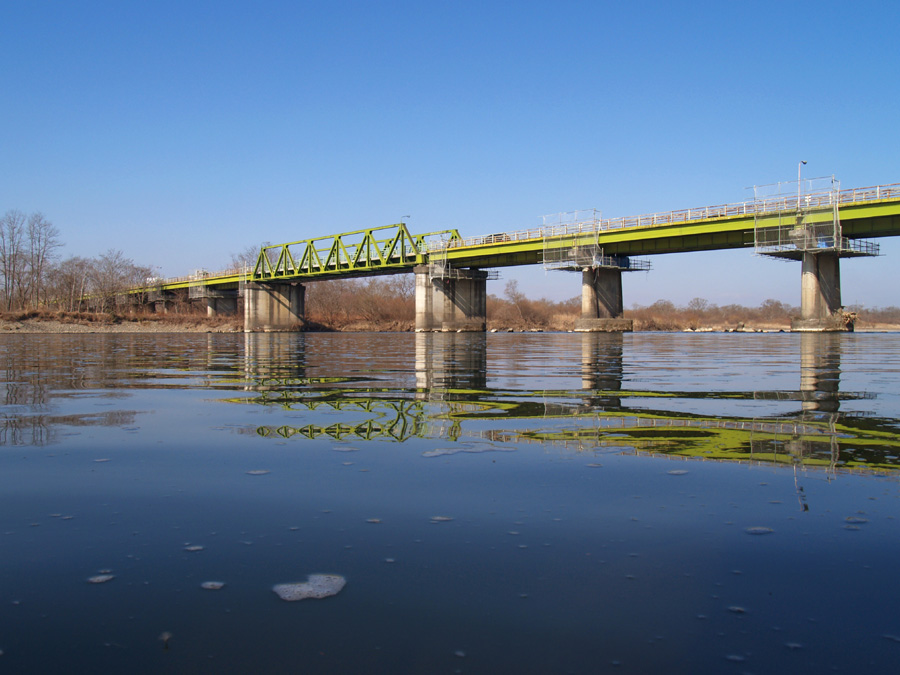
The Koyagi Bridge carries Route 397 over the Kitakami River in Mizusawa Ward, Oshu City, Iwate Prefecture. This bridge was built in 1978 but the center span fell in 1994.
