= Isawa Castle =

- 胆沢城
- Ōshū, Iwate Prefecture, Japan
- site of Isawa Castle

Site information
- Type: jōsaku-style Japanese castle
- Open to the public: yes

Location
- Coordinates: 39°10′47.02″N 141°08′6.0″E

Site history
- Built: 802 AD
- Built by: Sakanoue no Tamuramaro
- In use: early Heian period
- Demolished: unknown

Isawa Castle (胆沢城, Isawa-jō) was an early Heian period jōsaku-style Japanese castle located in what is now part of the city of Ōshū, Iwate in the Tōhoku region of far northern Honshu, Japan. The site was proclaimed a National National Historic Site in 1922.

== History ==
In the late Nara period, after the establishment of a centralized government under the Ritsuryō system, the imperial court sent a number of military expeditions to what is now the Tōhoku region of northern Japan to bring the local Emishi tribes under its control. The Emishi were able to successfully resist the Japanese for several decades; however, in 802 AD, the Chinjufu-shōgun Sakanoue no Tamuramaro led an expedition with 4000 troops from the ten provinces of eastern Japan (Suruga, Kai, Sagami, Musashi, Kazusa, Shimōsa, Hitachi, Shinano, Kōzuke and Shimotsuke) and built Isawa Castle as his stronghold within Emishi territory in the valley of the Kitakami River.

With the defeat of the Emishi chieftain Aterui, many of the Emishi tribes in the Shiwa District submitted to Japanese rule. In 803 AD, Shiwa Castle was established in what is now part of the city of Morioka to serve as an administrative center of the imperial government. However, the site was prone to flooding, and in 811 AD, and Shiwa Castle was abandoned in favor of Tokutan Castle approximately ten kilometers to the south. The garrison at Isawa Castle was reduced to 700 men in 815 AD, of whom many were local Emishi (known as Fushū (俘囚)) in the service of the imperial court. By the middle of the 9th century, mention of Isawa Castle largely disappears from the historical record, although it reappears as a stronghold of Abe no Munetō in the Zenkunen War against the forces central government led by Minamoto no Yoriyoshi. It may have been destroyed by the Gosannen War of 1083.

== Overview ==
Excavation research revealed that Isawa Castle was a square castle surrounded by double moat and wooden palisade measuring 670 meters on each side and thus enclosing an area of 460,000 square meters. At the center was a government office complex in a separate enclosure, with dimensions of 90 meters on each side. The site is located about 15 minutes by bus from Mizusawa Station on the JR East Tohoku Main Line.

== See also ==
- Emishi
- Taga Castle
- List of Historic Sites of Japan (Iwate)
