= Kitakami, Iwate =

Kitakami 北上市
- City
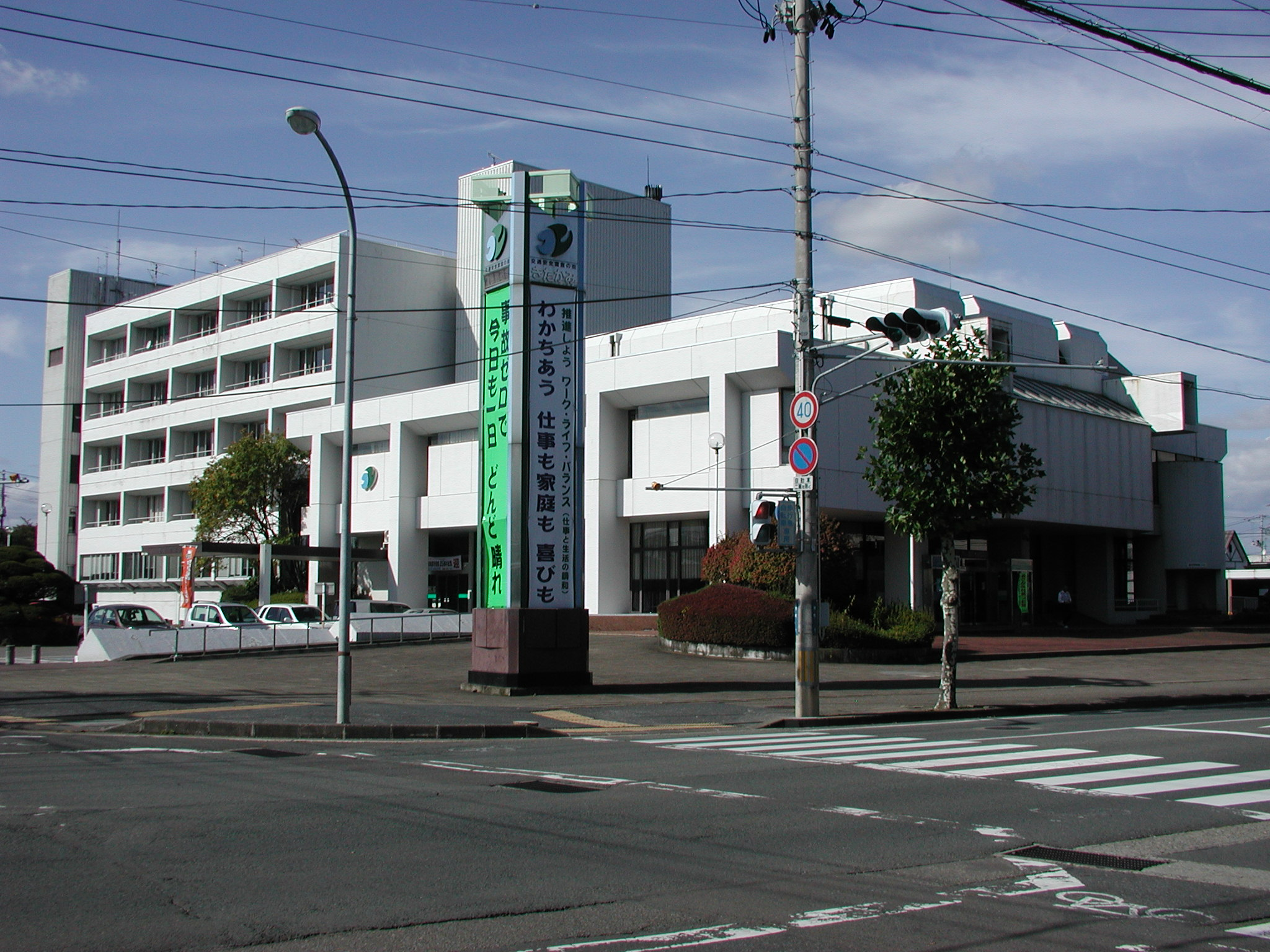
- Kitakami City Hall

- Flag Seal

- Location of Kitakami in Iwate Prefecture

- Coordinates: 39°17′12.3″N 141°6′47.6″E
- Country: Japan
- Region: Tōhoku
- Prefecture: Iwate

Government
  - -Mayor: Toshihiko Takahashi (since May 2011)

Area
  - Total: 437.55 km^{2} (168.94 sq mi)

Population (February 1, 2023)
  - Total: 92,875
  - Density: 212.26/km^{2} (549.75/sq mi)
- Time zone: UTC+9 (Japan Standard Time)
- Phone number: 0197-64-2111
- Address: 1-1 Yoshi-cho, Kitakami-shi, Iwate-ken 024-8501
- Climate: Cfa
- Website: Official website
- Symbols
- Bird: Grey wagtail
- Flower: White White lily
- Tree: Sakura

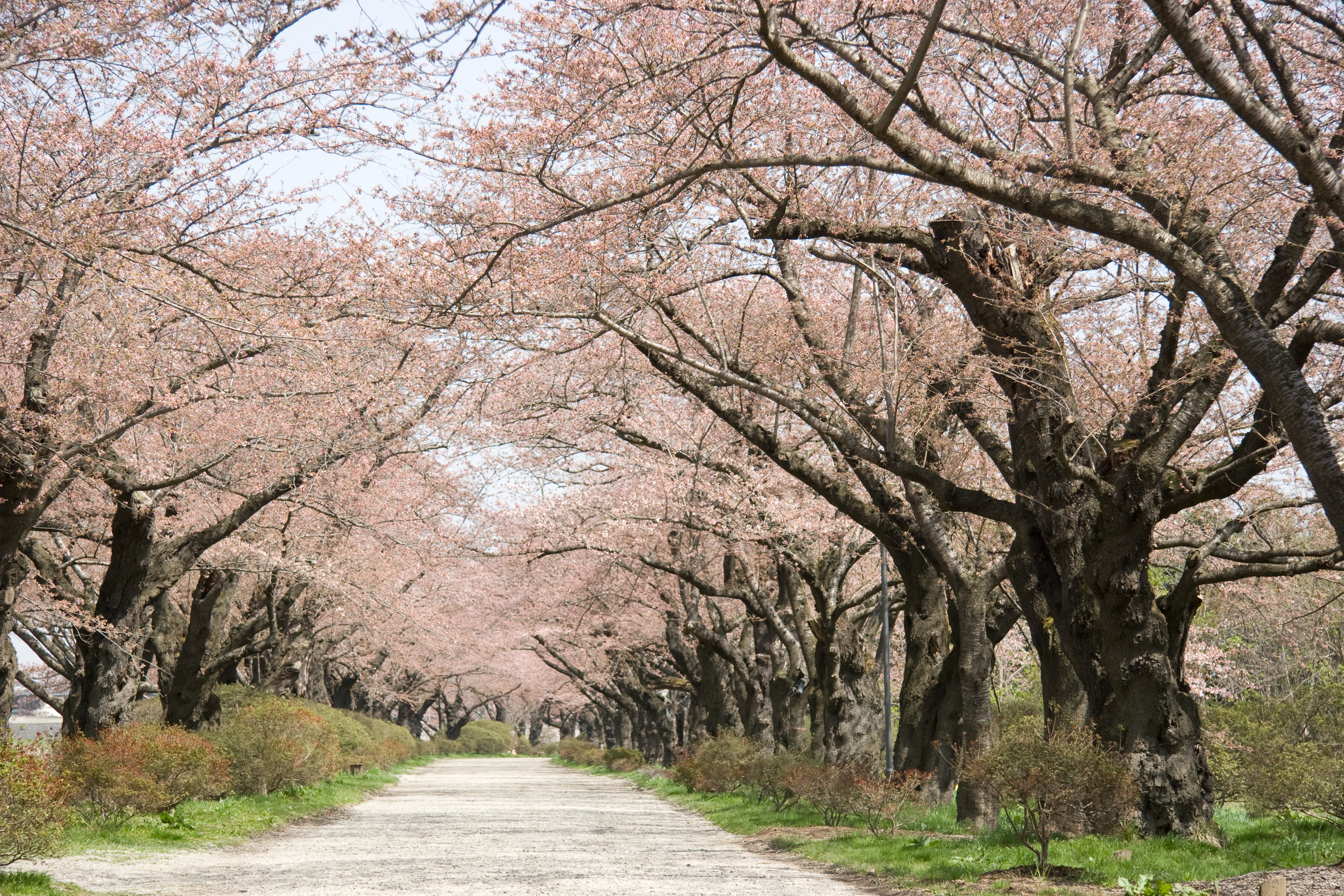
Tenshochi Park in Kitakami City

Kitakami (北上市, Kitakami-shi) is a city located in Iwate Prefecture, Japan. As of 1 June 2019, the city had an estimated population of 92,311, and a population density of 210 persons per km^{2} in 37,085 households. The total area of the city is 437.55 square kilometres (168.94 sq mi). The city is famous for the sakura that bloom in Tenshochi Park.

== Geography ==
Kitakami is located in south-central Iwate Prefecture, in the Kitakami River valley, approximately 45 kilometers south of the prefectural capital of Morioka, and 490 kilometers north of Tokyo. The city is at the confluence of the Kitakami River and the Waga River and has an altitude ranging from 50 to 200 meters above sea level, rising to 400 meters in the east.

=== Neighboring municipalities ===
Iwate Prefecture

- Hanamaki
- Kanegasaki
- Nishiwaga
- Ōshū

== Climate ==
Kitakami has a humid subtropical climate (Köppen Cfa) characterized by mild summers and cold winters. The average annual temperature in Kitakami is 10.5 °C. The average annual rainfall is 1319 mm with September as the wettest month and February as the driest month. The temperatures are highest on average in August, at around 24.3 °C, and lowest in January, at around -2.4 °C.

Climate data for Kitakami (elevation 61 m, 1991–2020 normals, extremes 1976–present)
Month	Jan	Feb	Mar	Apr	May	Jun	Jul	Aug	Sep	Oct	Nov	Dec	Year
Record high °C (°F)	13.4 (56.1)	17.7 (63.9)	21.7 (71.1)	28.9 (84.0)	33.5 (92.3)	33.8 (92.8)	38.3 (100.9)	37.9 (100.2)	35.8 (96.4)	28.5 (83.3)	22.4 (72.3)	18.4 (65.1)	38.3 (100.9)
Mean daily maximum °C (°F)	2.4 (36.3)	3.6 (38.5)	8.1 (46.6)	15.0 (59.0)	20.8 (69.4)	24.3 (75.7)	27.4 (81.3)	28.9 (84.0)	24.8 (76.6)	18.5 (65.3)	11.6 (52.9)	4.9 (40.8)	15.9 (60.6)
Daily mean °C (°F)	−0.9 (30.4)	−0.1 (31.8)	3.4 (38.1)	9.4 (48.9)	15.2 (59.4)	19.3 (66.7)	22.9 (73.2)	24.1 (75.4)	20.1 (68.2)	13.6 (56.5)	7.1 (44.8)	1.5 (34.7)	11.3 (52.3)
Mean daily minimum °C (°F)	−4.2 (24.4)	−3.7 (25.3)	−0.8 (30.6)	4.2 (39.6)	10.3 (50.5)	15.3 (59.5)	19.4 (66.9)	20.5 (68.9)	16.2 (61.2)	9.1 (48.4)	2.9 (37.2)	−1.7 (28.9)	7.3 (45.1)
Record low °C (°F)	−17.3 (0.9)	−17.4 (0.7)	−11.1 (12.0)	−5.4 (22.3)	−0.2 (31.6)	6.2 (43.2)	9.3 (48.7)	11.8 (53.2)	4.9 (40.8)	−1.0 (30.2)	−7.1 (19.2)	−15.0 (5.0)	−17.4 (0.7)
Average precipitation mm (inches)	72.7 (2.86)	56.3 (2.22)	87.7 (3.45)	86.4 (3.40)	112.1 (4.41)	128.1 (5.04)	196.7 (7.74)	165.3 (6.51)	156.1 (6.15)	118.2 (4.65)	91.7 (3.61)	91.9 (3.62)	1,357.8 (53.46)
Average snowfall cm (inches)	123 (48)	99 (39)	42 (17)	2 (0.8)	0 (0)	0 (0)	0 (0)	0 (0)	0 (0)	0 (0)	3 (1.2)	73 (29)	340 (134)
Average precipitation days (≥ 1.0 mm)	14.6	12.6	13.0	11.0	10.7	10.4	13.1	11.4	11.8	11.4	13.4	15.4	148.7
Mean monthly sunshine hours	90.1	100.5	141.4	172.0	183.6	149.2	128.8	147.5	121.3	131.4	108.2	84.9	1,562
Source: Japan Meteorological Agency

== Demographics ==
Per Japanese census data, the population of Kitakami has recently plateaued after several decades of growth.

Historical population
Year	Pop.	±%
1920	43,431	—
1930	47,101	+8.5%
1940	52,622	+11.7%
1950	67,097	+27.5%
1960	70,032	+4.4%
1970	68,074	−2.8%
1980	76,633	+12.6%
1990	82,902	+8.2%
2000	91,501	+10.4%
2010	93,147	+1.8%
2020	93,045	−0.1%

== History ==
The area of present-day Kitakami was part of ancient Mutsu Province, and has been settled since at least the Jōmon period by the Emishi people. The area was a stronghold for the Emishi chieftain Aterui until his death at the hands of Sakanoue Tamuramaro. During the later portion of the Heian period, the area was ruled by the Abe clan, and became a battleground during the Former Nine Years War. The Abe were followed by the Northern Fujiwara clan. During the Sengoku period, the area came under the control of the Nanbu clan. The area was part of Morioka Domain during the Edo period, under the Tokugawa shogunate, with the exception of two villages on its southeastern border, which were under Sendai Domain.

The town of Kurosawajiri was established by the Meiji period creation of the modern municipalities system on April 1, 1891. The modern city of Kitakami was founded on April 1, 1954, by the merger of the town of Kurosawajiri, with the villages of Iitoyo, Futako, Saraki, Oniyanai, Aisari and Fukuoka. On April 1, 1991 Kitakami absorbed the neighboring village of Ezuriko and town of Waga (both from Waga District).

On September 13, 2023, The DLC of Pokémon Scarlet and Violet, called The Hidden Treasure of Area Zero, was released, including a setting based on Kitakami.

== Government ==
Kitakami has a mayor-council form of government with a directly elected mayor and a unicameral city legislature of 13 members. Kitakami and the town of Nishiwaga collectively contribute four seats to the Iwate Prefectural legislature. In terms of national politics, the city is part of Iwate 3rd district of the lower house of the Diet of Japan.

== Economy ==
The economy of Kitakami was traditionally agricultural; however, due to its ease of access with Sendai and Morioka via the Tōhoku Expressway, the area has rapidly developed into a light manufacturing and transshipment center, with numerous industrial parks.

== Education ==
Kitakami has 17 public elementary schools and nine public junior high schools operated by the city government and five public high schools operated by the Iwate Prefectural Board of Education.

== Transportation ==
=== Railway ===
East Japan Railway Company (JR East) - Tōhoku Shinkansen

- Kitakami

East Japan Railway Company (JR East) - Tōhoku Main Line

- Kitakami - Murasakino

East Japan Railway Company (JR East) - Kitakami Line

- Kitakami - Yanagihara - Ezuriko - Fujine - Tatekawame -Yokokawame - Iwasawa - Wakasennin

=== Highway ===
- Tōhoku Expressway – Kitakami-Kanegasaki IC, Kitakami-Ezuriko IC
- Akita Expressway – Kitakami IC, Kitakami-Nishi IC
- National Route 4
- National Route 107
- National Route 456

== Local attractions ==
The city is famous for the sakura that bloom in Tenshochi Park, which is regarded as one of the hundred best places in Japan to view cherry blossoms.

Another hallmark of the city is Oni Kenbai, a traditional sword dance where the dancers dress as demons, performed during the summer festivals, such as Kitakami Michinoku Traditional Dance Festival.

Kitakami also boasts a site that is reputed to be the grave of the famous Heian period waka poet Izumi Shikibu.

=== National Historic Sites ===
- Ezuriko Kofun Cluster, Kofun period tumuli
- Hatten Site, Jōmon period settlement ruins
- Kabayama Site, Jōmon period ruins
- Kunimisan temple ruins, Heian period temple ruins,
- Nanbu-Date border mounds, Edo period border markers

== International relations ==
- Concord, California, United States, sister cities since October 25, 1974
- Sanmenxia, Henan Province, China, friendship cities since May 25, 1985

== Notable people from Kitakami ==
- Yoshiaki Fujiwara, professional wrestler
- Tatsuo Hirano, politician
- Tamaki Saitō, psychologist
- Hiroki Suzuki, actor
- Saori Takahashi, professional women's volleyball player
- Yoshida Tatsuya, musician
- Akira Yaegashi, professional boxer
