= Nanbu-Date border mounds =

Nanbu-Date Border Mounds
- 南部領伊達領境塚 (Japanese)
- Nanbu-Date Border Mounds Nanbu-Date border mounds (Japan)
- 39°15′53″N 141°03′03″E
- Type: boundary markers
- Periods: Edo period
- Location: Kitakami and Kanegasaki, Iwate, Japan
- Region: Tōhoku region

History
- Built: 1642, 1688

Site notes
- Public access: Yes (open-air museum)

The Nanbu-Date Border Mounds (南部領伊達領境塚, Nanburyō-Dateryō Sakaizuka) are a series of earth mounds constructed in the early Edo period to mark the border between the feudal domains of Morioka Domain (i.e. “Nanbu territory”) and Sendai Domain (i.e. i.e. “Date territory”) in Mutsu Province of northern Japan. Such boundary markers were common under the Tokugawa shogunate which ruled from 1602 to 1865; however, the number of markers and their excellent state of preservation led the grouping in the modern municipalities of Kitakami and Kanegasaki in Iwate Prefecture to be designated a National Historic Site. on January 31, 2000.

== Background ==
In the year 1642, the Tokugawa shogunate re-confirmed the Nanbu clan and the Date clan in their holdings, and drew a 130 kilometres (81 mi) boundary between the two feudal domains from Mount Komagatake in the Ōu Mountains in the west to the Pacific Ocean in the east. The boundary was defined physically by having a series of large earth mounds erected as boundary markers. In 1688, an additional series of smaller mounds was built to further delineate the boundary. In the 11 kilometer stretch currently designated as a National Historic Site, 17 large mounds and 198 small mounds are preserved.

The protected area is currently maintained as part of the “Michinoku Folk Village” open-air museum and is a thirty minute walk from JR East Kitakami Station.

== See also ==
- List of Historic Sites of Japan (Iwate)
