= Ōfunato =

Ōfunato 大船渡市
- City
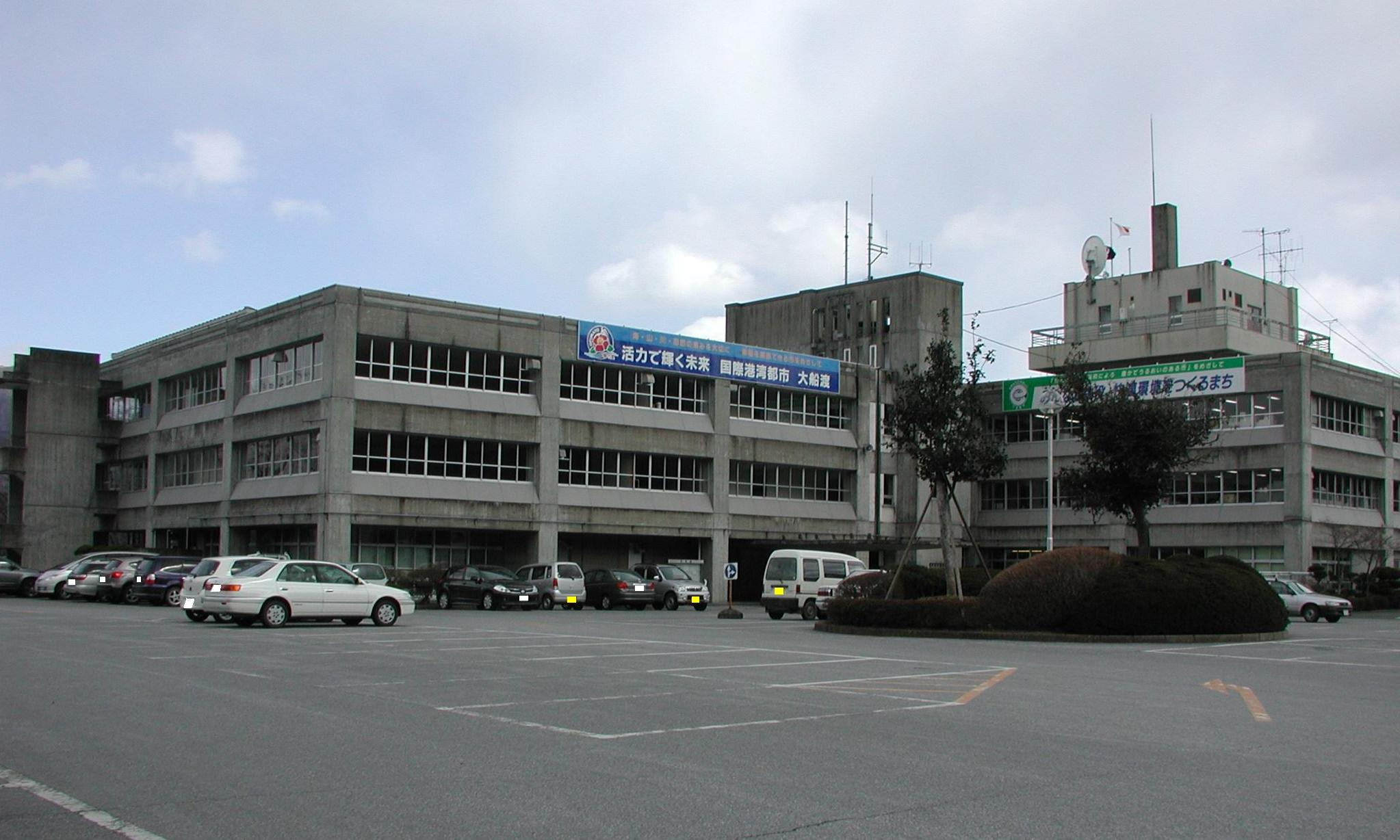
- Ōfunato City Hall

- Flag Seal

- Location of Ōfunato in Iwate Prefecture

- Coordinates: 39°04′55″N 141°42′32″E
- Country: Japan
- Region: Tōhoku
- Prefecture: Iwate

Area
  - Total: 322.51 km^{2} (124.52 sq mi)

Population (30 April 2020)
  - Total: 35,452
  - Density: 109.93/km^{2} (284.71/sq mi)
- Time zone: UTC+09:00 (Japan Standard Time)
- Phone number: 0192-27-3111
- Address: 15, Sakarichō Aza Utsunosawa, Ōfunato-shi, Iwate-ken 022-8501
- Climate: Cfa
- Website: Official website
- Symbols
- Bird: Black-tailed gull
- Flower: Camellia
- Tree: Pine

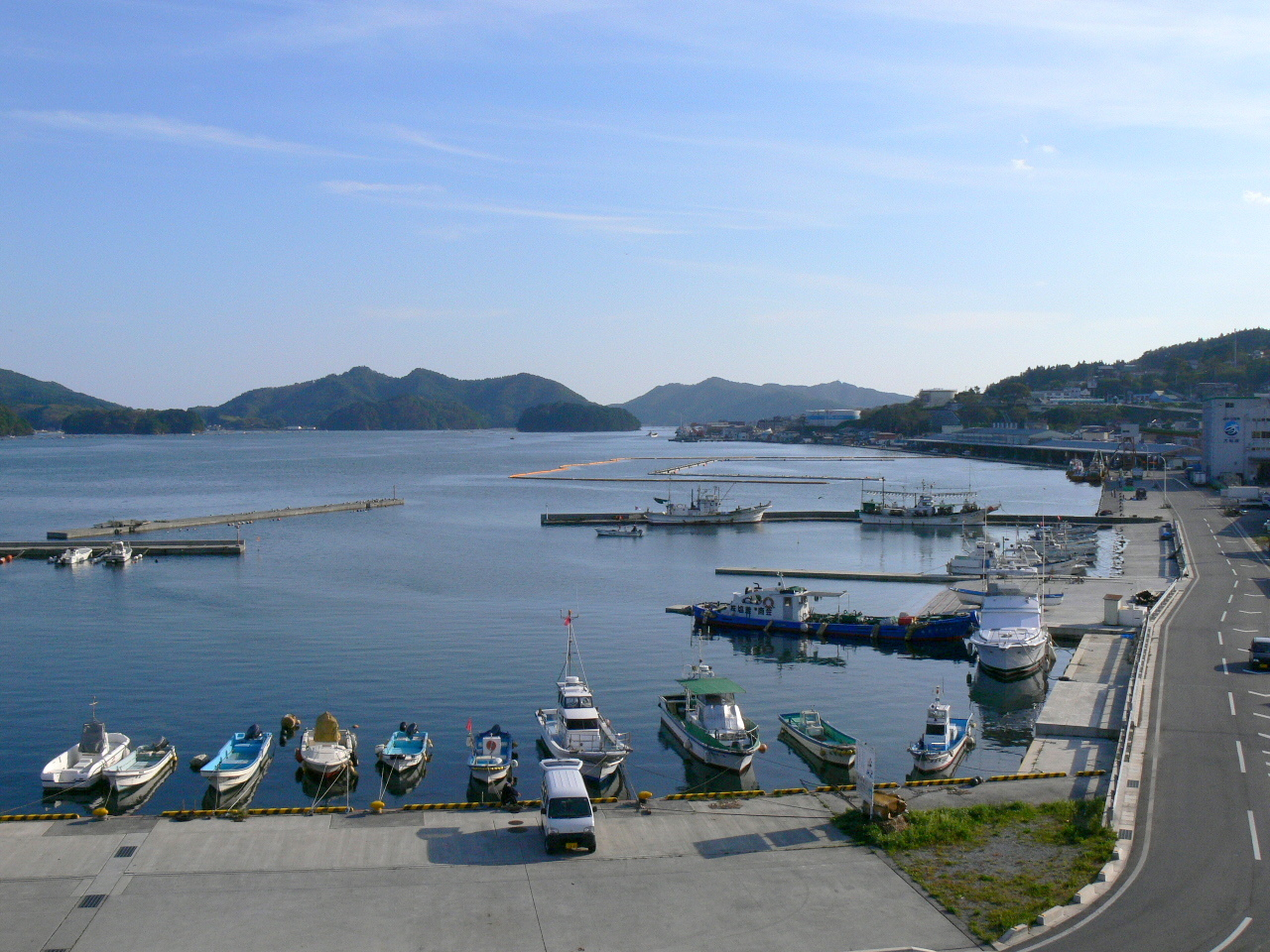
Ofunato port, 2006

Ōfunato (大船渡市, Ōfunato-shi; Japanese pronunciation: [ò̞ó̞.ɸɯ̈́.nä̀.tò̞, -nä́.tó̞.ɕì, ó̞ó̞-]) is a city located in Iwate Prefecture, Japan. As of 30 April 2020, the city had an estimated population of 35,452, and a population density of 110 persons per km^{2} in 14,895 households. The total area of the city is 322.51 square kilometres (124.52 sq mi).

== Geography ==
Ōfunato is located in southeastern Iwate Prefecture, with the Pacific Ocean to the east. Outside its bay, the warm and cold ocean currents meet, which allow a commercial fishing industry to flourish. The city has been attempting to establish itself as a major shipping port. Kaminari-iwa on the city's Goishi coastline has been designated one of the 100 Soundscapes of Japan by the Ministry of the Environment. Much of the city is within the borders of the Sanriku Fukkō National Park.

=== Neighbouring municipalities ===
Iwate Prefecture

- Kamaishi
- Rikuzentakata
- Sumita

=== Climate ===
Ōfunato has a humid subtropical climate (Köppen climate classification Cfa) with hot summers and cold winters. The average annual temperature in Ōfunato is 11.7 °C. The average annual rainfall is 1472 mm with September as the wettest month and January as the driest month. The temperatures are highest on average in August, at around 23.2 °C, and lowest in January, at around 1.1 °C.

Climate data for Ōfunato (elevation 36.9 m, 1991–2020 normals, extremes 1963–present)
Month	Jan	Feb	Mar	Apr	May	Jun	Jul	Aug	Sep	Oct	Nov	Dec	Year
Record high °C (°F)	16.8 (62.2)	17.7 (63.9)	23.9 (75.0)	32.0 (89.6)	34.7 (94.5)	34.5 (94.1)	37.0 (98.6)	37.0 (98.6)	35.2 (95.4)	28.2 (82.8)	24.6 (76.3)	21.2 (70.2)	37.0 (98.6)
Mean maximum °C (°F)	10.8 (51.4)	12.7 (54.9)	17.2 (63.0)	23.4 (74.1)	27.2 (81.0)	29.4 (84.9)	32.3 (90.1)	33.4 (92.1)	30.5 (86.9)	24.8 (76.6)	20.0 (68.0)	14.6 (58.3)	34.3 (93.7)
Mean daily maximum °C (°F)	4.7 (40.5)	5.6 (42.1)	9.1 (48.4)	14.5 (58.1)	19.1 (66.4)	22.1 (71.8)	25.6 (78.1)	27.2 (81.0)	24.2 (75.6)	19.0 (66.2)	13.3 (55.9)	7.4 (45.3)	16.0 (60.8)
Daily mean °C (°F)	1.1 (34.0)	1.4 (34.5)	4.4 (39.9)	9.4 (48.9)	14.2 (57.6)	17.9 (64.2)	21.7 (71.1)	23.2 (73.8)	20.0 (68.0)	14.4 (57.9)	8.6 (47.5)	3.5 (38.3)	11.7 (53.1)
Mean daily minimum °C (°F)	−2.4 (27.7)	−2.3 (27.9)	0.1 (32.2)	4.7 (40.5)	9.9 (49.8)	14.5 (58.1)	18.7 (65.7)	20.1 (68.2)	16.5 (61.7)	10.2 (50.4)	4.1 (39.4)	−0.2 (31.6)	7.8 (46.0)
Mean minimum °C (°F)	−6.6 (20.1)	−6.4 (20.5)	−4.4 (24.1)	−0.9 (30.4)	4.4 (39.9)	9.5 (49.1)	14.5 (58.1)	15.3 (59.5)	10.3 (50.5)	4.0 (39.2)	−1.4 (29.5)	−4.0 (24.8)	−7.4 (18.7)
Record low °C (°F)	−11.0 (12.2)	−11.6 (11.1)	−8.5 (16.7)	−4.3 (24.3)	0.2 (32.4)	3.8 (38.8)	4.9 (40.8)	10.2 (50.4)	4.7 (40.5)	−0.3 (31.5)	−4.8 (23.4)	−9.2 (15.4)	−11.6 (11.1)
Average precipitation mm (inches)	51.3 (2.02)	41.0 (1.61)	103.8 (4.09)	129.1 (5.08)	153.9 (6.06)	174.4 (6.87)	196.4 (7.73)	182.1 (7.17)	200.2 (7.88)	161.3 (6.35)	88.6 (3.49)	61.3 (2.41)	1,543.4 (60.76)
Average snowfall cm (inches)	13 (5.1)	14 (5.5)	8 (3.1)	1 (0.4)	0 (0)	0 (0)	0 (0)	0 (0)	0 (0)	0 (0)	1 (0.4)	9 (3.5)	45 (18)
Average precipitation days (≥ 0.5 mm)	7.3	7.2	9.7	10.2	11.0	12.0	14.2	12.3	12.9	10.5	8.2	8.6	124.4
Average snowy days (≥ 1 cm)	4.6	4.1	2.3	0.2	0.0	0.0	0.0	0.0	0.0	0.0	0.1	2.7	13.7
Average relative humidity (%)	62	62	62	65	71	79	82	82	80	75	69	65	71
Mean monthly sunshine hours	141.9	134.9	158.2	174.1	180.4	151.4	133.9	143.7	118.7	136.9	137.9	131.9	1,743.9
Source: Japan Meteorological Agency

== Demographics ==
Per Japanese census data, the population of Ōfunato peaked around the year 1980, and has declined over the past 40 years.

Historical population
Year	Pop.	±%
1920	24,175	—
1930	28,608	+18.3%
1940	32,767	+14.5%
1950	41,589	+26.9%
1960	47,363	+13.9%
1970	48,816	+3.1%
1980	50,132	+2.7%
1990	47,219	−5.8%
2000	45,160	−4.4%
2010	40,737	−9.8%
2020	34,728	−14.8%

== History ==
The area of present-day Ōfunato was part of ancient Mutsu Province, and has been settled since at least the Jōmon period, and numerous shell middens around Ōfunato Bay have been excavated by archaeologists. During the Sengoku period, the area was dominated by various samurai clans before coming under the control of the Date clan during the Edo period, who ruled Sendai Domain under the Tokugawa shogunate.

The village of Ōfunato was created within Kessen District, Iwate on 1 April 1889 with the establishment of the modern municipalities system. The 1896 Sanriku earthquake caused a 25-meter tsunami which killed 27,000 people in the area. Ōfunato was elevated to town status on 1 April 1932. The 1933 Sanriku earthquake had a magnitude of 8.4 and caused a 28-meter tsunami which killed 1522 people.

The neighboring town of Sakari and the villages of Akasaki, Takkon, Massaki, Ikawa and Hikoroichi merged with Ōfunato on 1 April 1952, forming the city of Ōfunato. The city became internationally famous when it was hit by a tsunami caused by the Valdivia earthquake in Chile 22 May 1960. On 15 November 2001, the town of Sanriku (from Kesen District) was merged into Ōfunato.

=== 2011 Tōhoku earthquake and tsunami ===
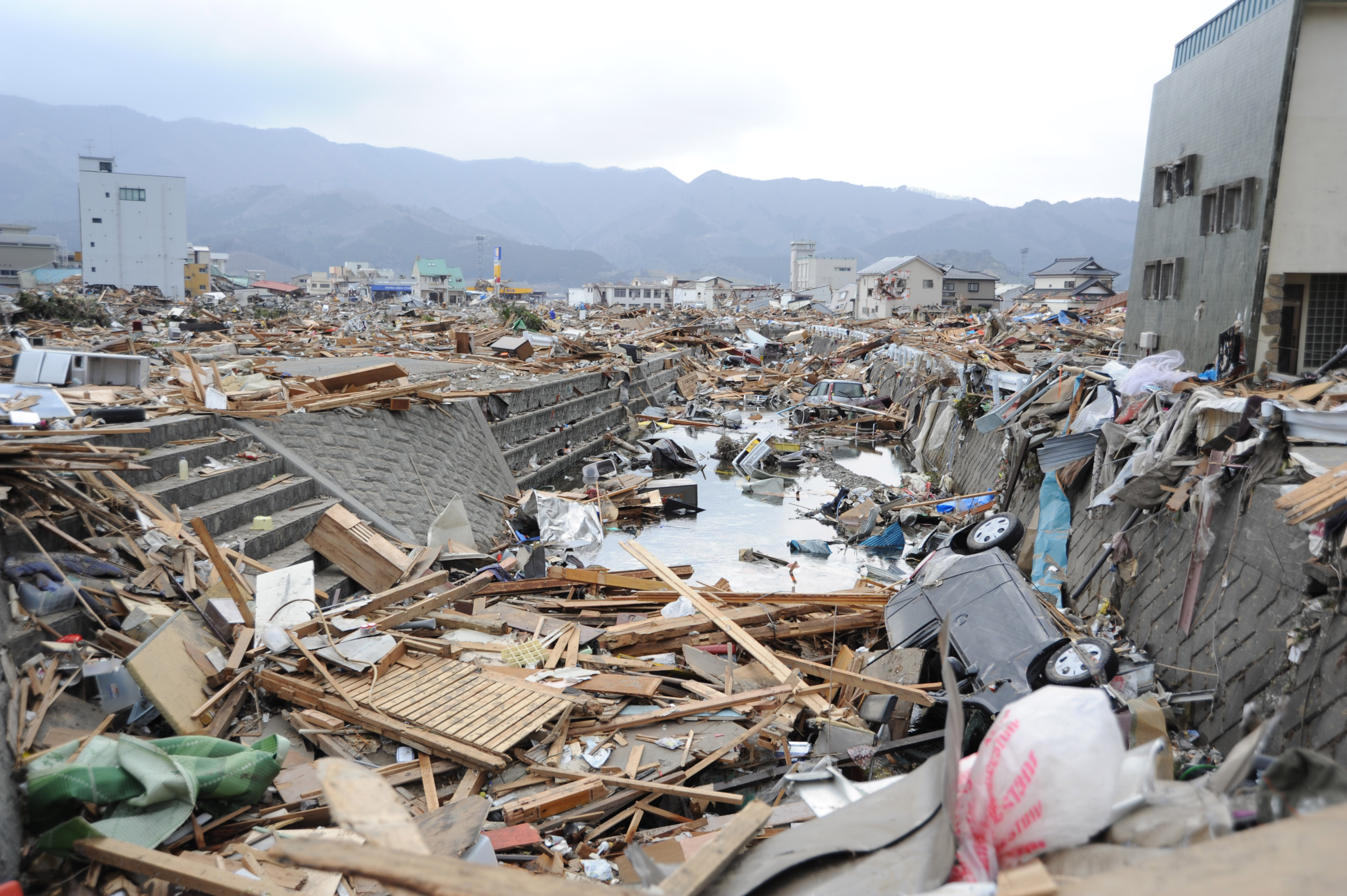
Downtown area of Ōfunato following the 2011 tsunami

Ōfunato hit the headlines again when it was heavily damaged in the 2011 Tōhoku earthquake and tsunami. The wave was estimated to have reached 23.6 meters in height. Funneled in by the narrow bay, the tsunami continued inland for 3 kilometres. Ofunato's theatre - which had remarkably sustained no damage - was one of the few buildings still standing, and gave shelter to about 250 survivors. Provisional counts listed 3,498 houses out of 15,138 houses in the town destroyed by the tsunami and 305 lives were confirmed lost. At least six of the town's 58 designated evacuation sites were inundated by the tsunami. The impact of the earthquake and tsunami on Ōfunato, as well as the rescue efforts in its aftermath, was featured extensively in the British documentary "Japan's Tsunami Caught on Camera" which was broadcast on Channel 4 in the United Kingdom.

=== 2025 Ōfunato Wildfire ===
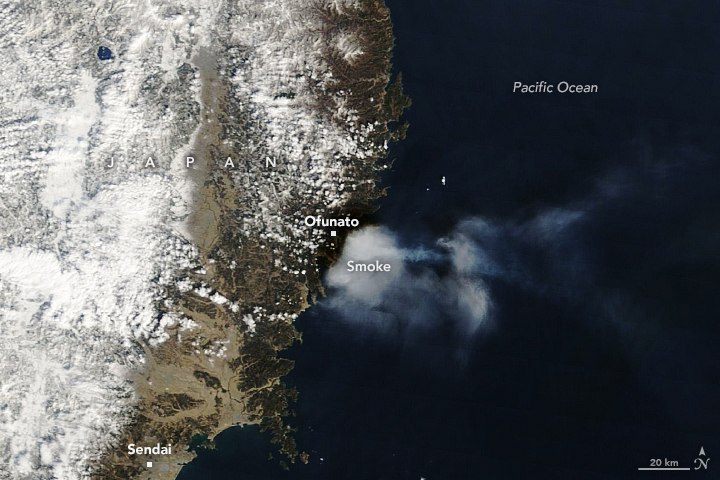
A satellite image of the wildfire

On 26 February 2025, a wildfire occurred southeast of the city, growing to become one of the largest in Japanese history by 4 March.

== Government ==
Ōfunato has a mayor-council form of government with a directly elected mayor and a unicameral city legislature of 25 members. Ōfunato contributes one seat to the Iwate Prefectural legislature. In terms of national politics, the city is part of Iwate 2nd district of the lower house of the Diet of Japan.

== Economy ==
The local economy is largely based on commercial fishing, with cement production and wood processing as secondary industries.

== Education ==
- Kitasato University – Sanriku campus
- Ōfunato has 11 public elementary schools and five public middle schools operated by the city government, and two public high schools operated by the Iwate Prefectural Board of Education. The city also has one private high school.

== Transportation ==
=== Railway ===
Sanriku Railway Company – Sanriku Railway Rias Line

- Sakari–Rikuzen-Akasaki–Ryōri–Koishihama–Horei–Sanriku–Yoshihama

East Japan Railway Company (JR East) – Ōfunato Line (services suspended indefinitely and replaced by a BRT)

- Hosoura–Shimofunato–Ōfunato–Sakari

=== Highway ===
- Sanriku Expressway
- National Route 45
- National Route 107
- National Route 397

=== Port ===
- Port of Ōfunato

== Local attractions ==
- Goishi Coast, National Place of Scenic Beauty and Natural Monument
- Sangojima, National Place of Scenic Beauty
- Shimofunato Shell Mound, Ōhora Shell Mound, Takonoura Shell Mound, National Historic Sites

== International relations ==
- Palos de la Frontera, Huelva, Spain, sister city since 12 August 1992

== Noted people from Ōfunato ==
- Yoshinobu Fujiwara, politician
- Tochinohana Hitoshi, sumo wrestler
- Nanae Sasaki, marathon runner
