= Tokutan Castle =

- 徳丹城
- Yahabe, Iwate Prefecture, Japan
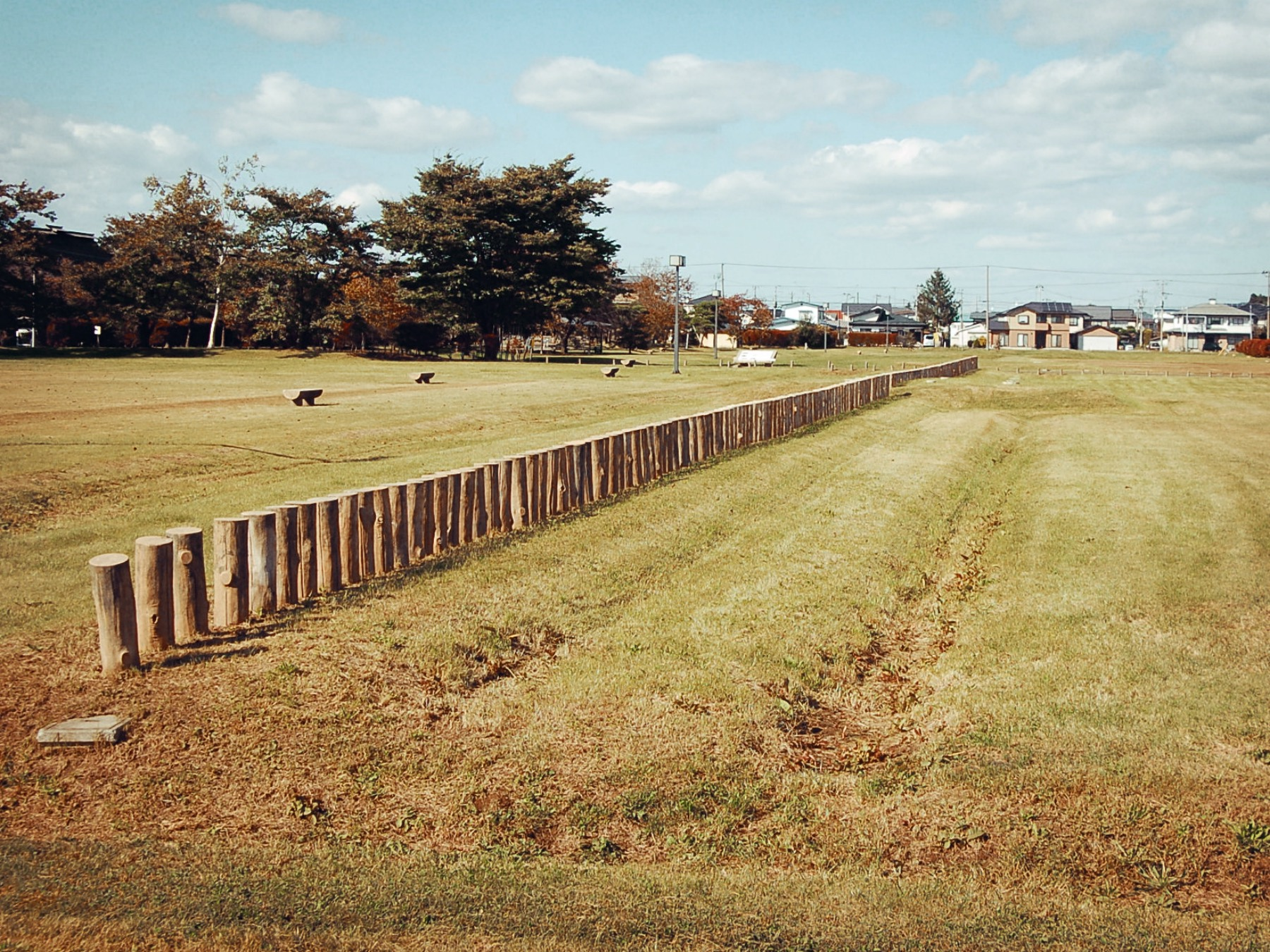
- Tokutan Castle site

Site information
- Type: jōsaku-style Japanese castle
- Open to the public: yes (park)
- Condition: ruins

Location
- Tokutan Castle site Tokutan Castle (Japan)
- Coordinates: 39.6073°N 141.1721°E

Site history
- Built: 811 AD
- Built by: Sakanoue no Tamuramaro
- In use: Heian period
- Demolished: unknown

Tokutan Castle (徳丹城, Tokutan-jō) was an early Heian period jōsaku-style Japanese castle located in what is now the town of Yahaba in Shiwa District, Iwate Prefecture in the Tōhoku region of far northern Honshū, Japan. The site was proclaimed a National Historic Site of Japan on 5 August 1969.

== Background ==
In the late Nara period, after the establishment of a centralized government under the Ritsuryō system, the Yamato court sent a number of military expeditions to what is now the Tōhoku region of northern Japan to bring the local Emishi tribes under its control. The Emishi were able to successfully resist the Japanese for several decades; however, in 802 AD, the Chinjufu-shōgun Sakanoue no Tamuramaro defeated Emishi chieftain Aterui, and many of the Emishi tribes in Shiwa region (the Kitakami River Valley) submitted to Japanese rule. In 803 AD, Shiwa Castle was established in what is now part of the city of Morioka to serve as an administrative center for the imperial government. However, the site was prone to flooding, and in 811 AD, a new site was selected approximately ten kilometers to the south. This was the start of Tokutan Castle.

== Description ==
Tokutan Castle was a square enclosure located on a river terrace on the western bank the Kitakami River, approximately 356 meters on each side, consisting of an earthen rampart surmounted by a wooden palisade. Yagura watchtowers were erected at 70-80 meter intervals, with gates in the center of each wall facing each of the cardinal directions. The southeastern corner of the castle was a swamp, and it is uncertain of the walls and palisade extended to this area. Also to the east of the castle is a 400 meter long remnant of a canal, which evidently once connected the castle directly to the Kitakami River. Tokutan Castle appeared to have been partially built on top of an earlier site, with dimensions of approximately 150 meters to a side, which was at an angle to, and extended further to the east than the later, larger, enclosure.

As with the earlier Shiwa Castle, in the center of the enclosure was a fortified compound containing buildings for local administration; however, as Tokutan Castle was considerably smaller in scale than Shiwa Castle, it had a garrison of approximately 500 men.

Although completed in 811 AD, Tokutan Castle was officially closed only four years later, in 815 AD. After its imperial garrison was withdrawn, the fortifications continued to be manned until sometime in the mid-9th century by the local Fushū (俘囚) militia (Emishi who were loyal to the Yamato court), but was eventually abandoned at some unknown time.

== Current situation ==
There are no physical remains of Tokutan Castle today, although its outline can be discerned by aerial photography. Japan National Route 4 cuts through the site north-to-south, and most of the site is occupied by the local Tokuda Elementary School. Despite its legally protected status, a large portion of the site was severely damaged by construction work during the reconstruction of Tokuda Elementary School.

On 31 July 2006 the Yahaba Town Board of Education announced that a wooden kabuto and other artifacts had been discovered at a well on the site.

The site is a park, containing the Yahaba Town History and Folklore Museum (矢巾町歴史民俗資料館) which displays a number of item recovered during archaeological investigations and construction work. It is approximately five minutes by car from the JR East Tōhoku Main Line Yahaba Station.

== See also ==
- Emishi
- Taga Castle
- List of Historic Sites of Japan (Iwate)
