= Shijūshida Dam =

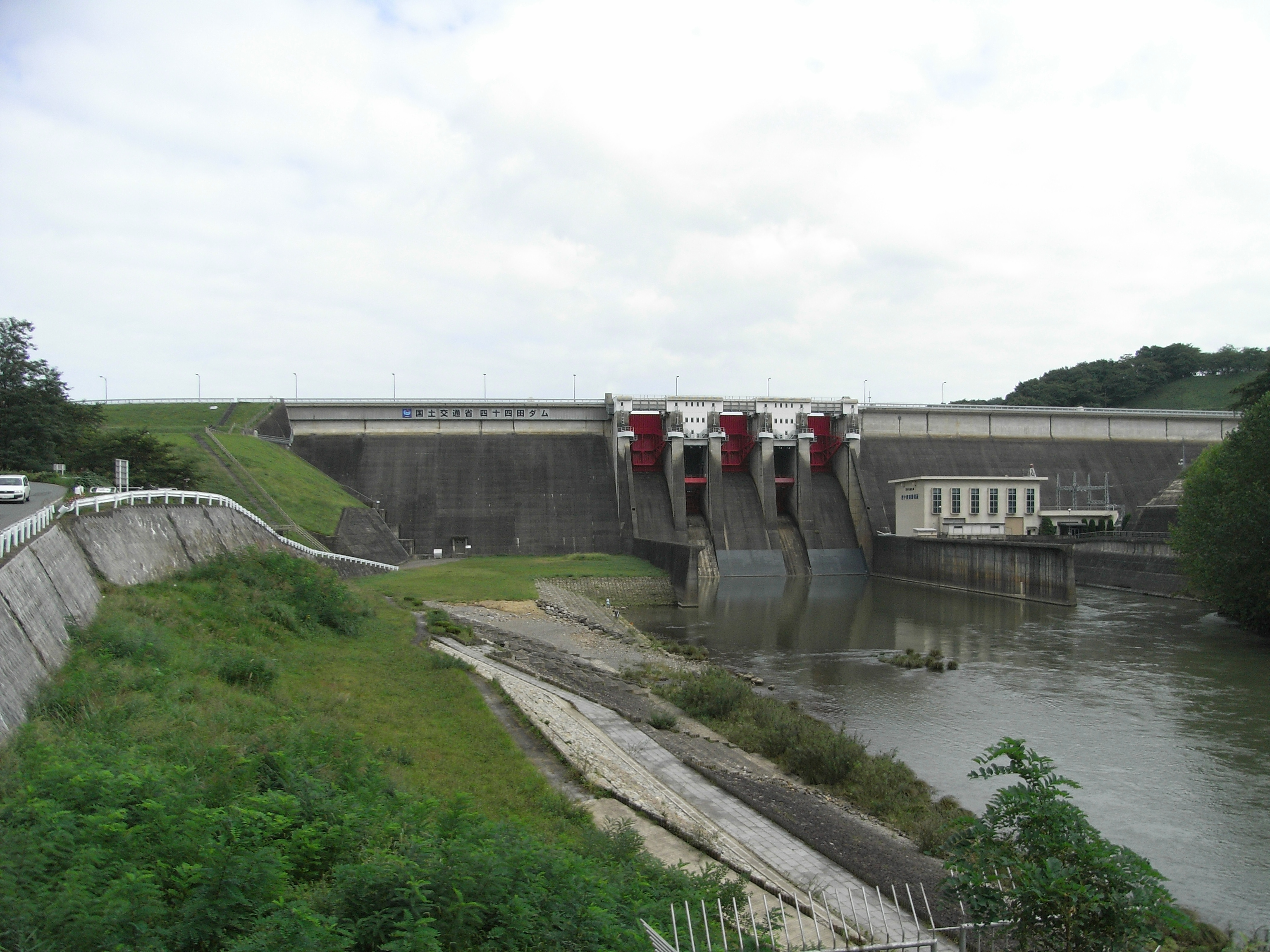

- Location within Japan
- Official name: 四十四田ダム
- Location: Morioka, Iwate, Japan
- Coordinates: 39°45′10.2″N 141°08′54.5″E
- Construction began: 1960
- Opening date: 1968
- Operator: Iwate Prefecture

Dam and spillways
- Type of dam: Concrete gravity dam
- Impounds: Kitakami River
- Height: 50.0 m (164.0 ft)
- Length: 480.0 m (1,574.8 ft)

Reservoir
- Creates: Nanbu-Katafuji Lake
- Total capacity: 35,500,000 m3
- Catchment area: 1196.7 km2
- Surface area: 390.0 hectares (964 acres)

Power Station
- Operator: Iwate Prefecture
- Annual generation: 15,100 KW

The Shijūshida Dam (四十四田ダム, Shijūshida damu) is a dam on the Kitakami River, located in Morioka, Iwate Prefecture on the island of Honshū, Japan.

== History ==
Shijūshida Dam is the fourth in a series of five multipurpose dams built directly on the main stream of the Kitakami River, starting with the Tase Dam in 1941. The project was launched by the Economic Stabilization Bureau in 1947 following Typhoon Kathleen in September 1947 (which killed 1547 people). The need for a dam primarily for flood control was emphasized by Typhoon Ione in September of the following year, which killed an additional 1956 people. The dam was first completed by the Kajima Corporation in 1968.

== Design ==
The Shijūshida Dam was designed as a concrete gravity arch dam; however, since the rocks on both banks were weak, the dam was completed as a hybrid design with earthen dams on the sides and a concrete gravity dam in the center. The project was complicated by the extreme acidity of the water (reaching pH of 4.0) due to runoff from the Matsuo mine upstream. This acidity resulted in the use of special concrete and alloy materials. Generators for the associated hydroelectric power plant produce 15,100 KW of electricity.
