= Shibusawa Dam =

Dam on the Nakatsu River, Iwate Prefecture, Japan

- Location: Yamanouchi, Nagano Prefecture, Japan.
- Coordinates: 36°45′47″N 138°37′42″E
- Construction began: 1953
- Opening date: 1955

Dam and spillways
- Impounds: Nakatsu River
- Height: 20.7 m
- Length: 33.75 m

Reservoir
- Total capacity: 19,000 m^{3}
- Catchment area: 504.5 km^{2}
- Surface area: 1.1 hectares

Shibusawa Dam (Japanese: 渋沢ダム) is a dam constructed on the Nakatsu River within the Shinano River system on the border between Yamanouchi Town and the Shimotakai District of Nagano Prefecture and near Sakae Village in the Shimotakai District. It is a 20.7-meter-high gravity-type concrete dam used for power generation by Tokyo Electric Power Company's renewable energy subsidiary. Water from the river is fed to the Kiriake Power Plant, generating a maximum of 20,000 kilowatts of electricity.

== History ==
The basin of the Nakatsu River, which originates at Lake Nozori in Gunma Prefecture and flows through Nagano Prefecture and then into Niigata Prefecture, lies in the scenic Akiyamago region. A hydroelectric power plant using the Shinano River's water was constructed in the Taishō era (1912-1926), and the area was redeveloped by the Tokyo Electric Power Company, which inherited the water rights shortly after World War II. When the Nakatsu River was then dammed, Lake Nozori was created.

Construction of the Kiriaki Power Station and Shibusawa Dam began in 1953 and was completed in 1955. The Shibusawa Dam is located downstream of Lake Nozori, and in addition to the normal flow of water, water from Lake Nozori can be released to supply the plant in times of water shortage. After generating up to 20,000 kW of electricity at the power plant, the water is pumped through the spillway to the Nakatsugawa No. 1 Power Plant and the Koyasan Dam.

== Surroundings ==
Kiriaki is a remote village in the Akiyamago region and is famous for its onsen (hot springs). This region has long had poor access to transportation, which may have contributed to the development of its unique culture.

Road access was improved to facilitate the construction of the power plant, making it easier for large vehicles to pass through, and today National Route 405 is a tourist road that can be used to reach Kiriaki Hot Springs by car. However, the road from Kiriake to Lake Nozori via Shibusawa Dam remains an unimproved national highway and is closed in winter due to heavy snowfall.

== Incidents ==
In December 20, 2006 and January 10, 2007 press releases, TEPCO admitted to fraud concerning Shibusawa Dam: water level data had been falsified in a 1998 report for the Ministry of International Trade and Industry (now the Ministry of Economy, Trade and Industry.) Since Shibusawa Dam serves as a flood discharge dam, the falsified data was egregious. Shibusawa Dam has only one sluice as a flood outlet. In the event of a flood, this is opened to allow the large volume of water rushing into the dam to pass through, thereby ensuring the dam's safety. However, the area surrounding the dam often receives heavy snowfall, with as much as three meters of snow accumulating each year. In winter, the gates are sometimes rendered inoperable due to heavy snow and low temperatures.

During an April 1997 flood, the sluice gate failed to open and water levels exceeded their recommended levels, causing water to overflow from the dam's top edge. The Shibusawa Dam was originally designed to allow the entire dam to overflow and release water in anticipation of floods that would be too large to be released through the flood sluice gate. The fact that water flowed over the top of the dam itself was not a serious safety concern, but the fact that the water level constantly exceeded the recommended levels, even during non-flood conditions, was considered a problem, so the dam's water level data for April 5–11, 1997 was falsified to report levels lower than they actually were.
