= Typhoon Ione =

Pacific typhoon in 1948

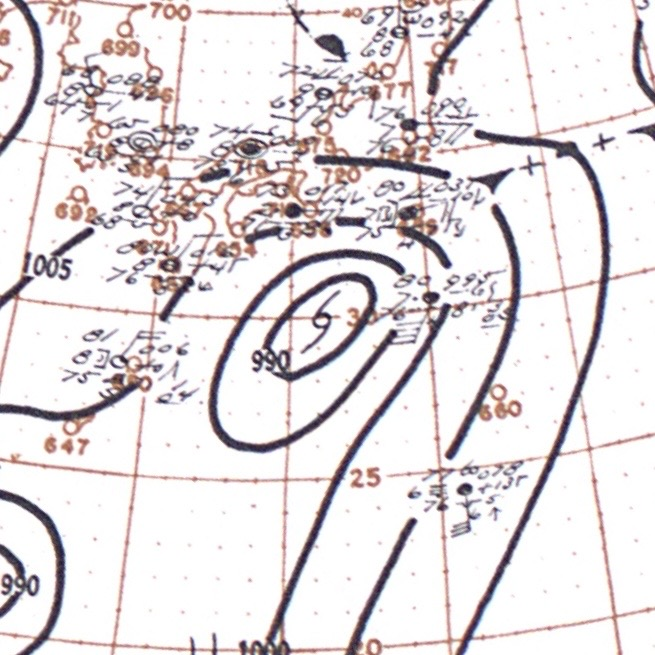
- Weather map on September 15 showing Typhoon Ione approaching Japan

Meteorological history
- Formed: September 11, 1948
- Dissipated: September 17, 1948

Unknown-strength storm
- 10-minute sustained (JMA)
- Lowest pressure: 925 hPa (mbar); 27.32 inHg

Category 4-equivalent typhoon
- 1-minute sustained (SSHWS/JTWC)
- Highest winds: 220 km/h (140 mph)

Overall effects
- Fatalities: 512 confirmed
- Missing: 326
- Damage: Unknown
- Areas affected: Northern Mariana Islands, Japan
- IBTrACS
- Part of the 1948 Pacific typhoon season

Typhoon Ione was a catastrophic and deadly tropical cyclone that left over 512 confirmed deaths and another 326 to be missing as it affected Japan, with the majority of the fatalities coming from the city of Ichinoseki in Iwate Prefecture. It also left a significant trail of damage on the country, just after Typhoon Kathleen devastated the area. The fourteenth named storm and the ninth typhoon of the 1948 Pacific typhoon season, Ione was first seen in weather maps as a tropical storm near the Mariana Islands on September 11. It moved to the northwest, passing through the island country, before strengthening to a typhoon on September 13. It rapidly organized to a Category 4 typhoon and reached its peak intensity on the next day before slowly weakening as it started to approach the Japanese archipelago, while curving to the northeast. It then made landfall on September 16 between the present cities of Tateyama and Kisarazu in Chiba Prefecture as a minimal typhoon. It then passed through the southern coast of Hokkaido, before gradually degraded to a tropical storm as it emerged in the Pacific Ocean on the next day. It then became extratropical, shortly after.

== Meteorological history ==
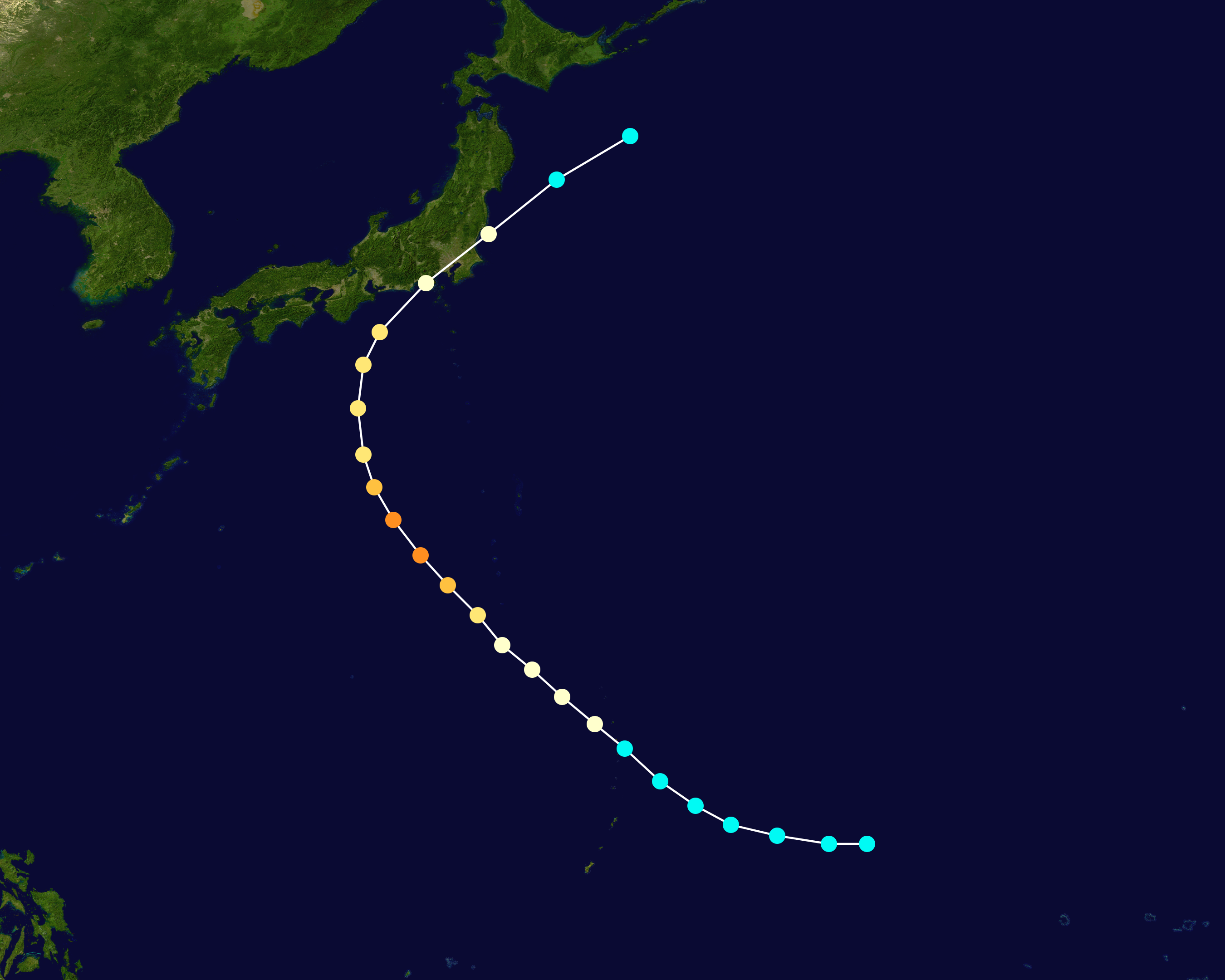
Map plotting the storm's track and intensity, according to the Saffir–Simpson scale Map key Saffir–Simpson scale Tropical depression (≤38 mph, ≤62 km/h) Tropical storm (39–73 mph, 63–118 km/h) Category 1 (74–95 mph, 119–153 km/h) Category 2 (96–110 mph, 154–177 km/h) Category 3 (111–129 mph, 178–208 km/h) Category 4 (130–156 mph, 209–251 km/h) Category 5 (≥157 mph, ≥252 km/h) Unknown Storm type Tropical cyclone Subtropical cyclone Extratropical cyclone, remnant low, tropical disturbance, or monsoon depression

At 00:00 UTC of September 11, the Fleet Weather Center noted that a tropical storm formed near the Mariana Islands, with one-minute sustained winds of 75 km/h (45 mph) detected near its center. The agency also named it Ione, the fourteenth storm to be named during the season. It steadily organized as it passed the island country, before strengthening to a minimal typhoon during September 13. Moving to the northwest, it started to rapidly intensify under a favorable environment, becoming a Category 4 typhoon at 12:00 UTC of September 14, nearly 1,023 km to the southeast of Miyakonojō. It held its intensity over 7 hours, before slowly weakening as it started to interact with an unfavorable environment. A strengthening high-pressure area curved Ione to the north-northeast, while further degrading to a Category 2 typhoon. Land interaction with the Japanese archipelago weakened the typhoon, before making landfall as a minimal typhoon between the cities of Tateyama and Kisarazu on the mid-morning of September 16. While inland, Ione rapidly weakened to a tropical storm as it moved to the Pacific Ocean, with the system starting extratropical transition. The system was last noted at 00:00 UTC of the next day as it fully became extratropical. The remnants; however, continued to move to the northeast, passing through the Kuril Islands before dissipating on the Sea of Okhotsk.

== Preparations, impact and aftermath ==
In the preparations for the typhoon, railway and flight operations were halted due to the bad weather. Some U.S. troops also helped to evacuate families through safe places. Heavy rainfalls were also expected.

Between 06:00 and 09:00 UTC (15:00 and 18:00 JST), Ione started to affect Japan. In Tateyama, the maximum instantaneous wind speed recorded was 46.7 mph and the winds were strong in the center while the typhoon is making landfall, resulting in torrential rainfall and strong winds, causing many houses to fall and disintegrate. Sendai recorded a rainfall amount of 351.1 mm and Miyako received an amount of 249.3 mm during the typhoon's passage. Up to seven feet of floodwaters were experienced at Ichinoseki. The typhoon also destroyed over 5,889 homes, leaving over 15,000 individuals homeless. The authorities also received some considerable reports of crop and farmland damages in the prefectures of Gunma, Ibaraki and Yamanashi. Some bridges in Ibaraki were also washed out by spilling rivers. Two hotels were also isolated due to a large landslide, trapping inside over a hundred Americans who were just staying in the place for the typhoon. Some farmers, despite the storm, harvested their crops that were partially destroyed by the winds. In addition, due to another extratropical storm in the Sea of Japan, the combined effects of the system and the typhoon caused heavy rainfall as far as Hokkaido.

The records of the Japan Meteorological Agency about Ione shows 512 fatalities; however, some reports says it may be higher as 650 or 838. Over 1,965 individuals were injured due to various reasons. 435 ships also sustained damages and over 133,428 hectares of farmland were flooded and/or destroyed.

Following the typhoon, in 1951, the Kitakami River basin in Kitakami River, located in Tohoku region was designated as a specified region under the National Comprehensive Land Development Act and a plan was started to protect the basin from the floods.

== See also ==
Typhoon disasters in Japan

- Typhoon Della - a typhoon that caused over 252 deaths in the country.
- Typhoon Judith - a typhoon that caused over 154 fatalities in the country.
- Typhoon Kitty - a typhoon that caused over 135 deaths in the country.
