= Shiwa-Chūō Station =

Railway station in Shiwa, Iwate Prefecture, Japan

Shiwa-Chūō Station 紫波中央駅
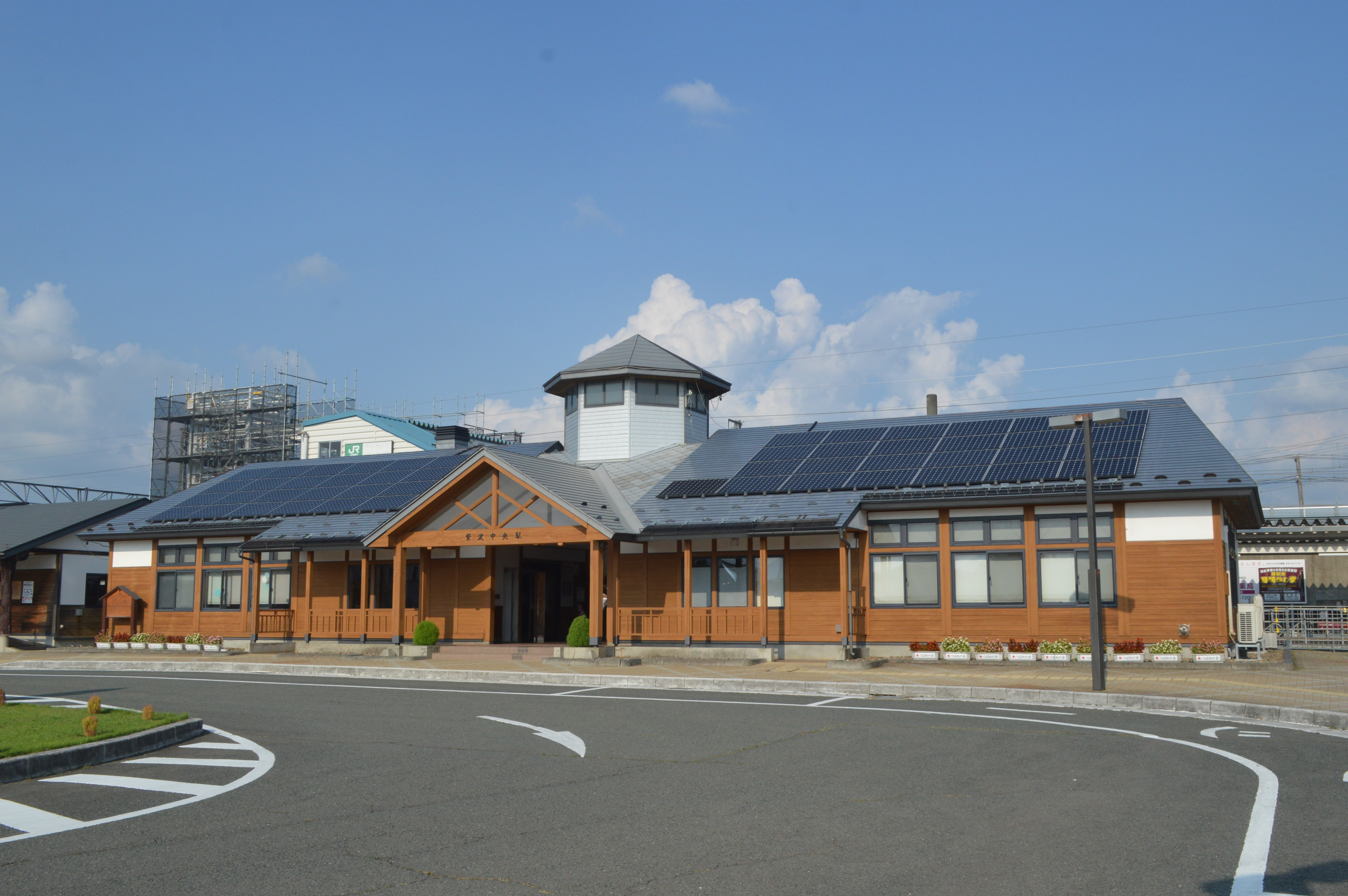
- Shiwa-Chūō Station, 2023

General information
- Location: 1-2-2 Shiwa-Chūō-ekimae, Shiwa-cho, Shiwa-gun, Iwate 028-3318; Japan
- Coordinates: 39.5549°N 141.1599°E
- Operator: JR East
- Line: ■ Tōhoku Main Line
- Distance: 518.6 km from Tokyo
- Platforms: 2 side platforms
- Tracks: 2

Other information
- Status: Staffed (Midori no Madoguchi)
- Website: Official website

History
- Opened: 14 March 1994

Passengers
- FY2018: 1546

Services
Preceding station	JR East	Following station
Hizume towards Kuroiso	Tōhoku Main Line Local	Furudate towards Morioka
Location
- Location within Iwate Prefecture Location within Japan

Shiwa-Chūō Station (紫波中央駅, Shiwa-chūō-eki) is a railway station in the town of Shiwa, Iwate Prefecture, Japan, operated by East Japan Railway Company (JR East).

== Lines ==
Shiwa-Chūō Station is served by the Tōhoku Main Line, and is located 518.6 rail kilometers from the terminus of the line at Tokyo Station.

== Station layout ==
The station has two opposed side platforms connected by a footbridge. The station has a Midori no Madoguchi staffed ticket office.

=== Platforms ===
1	■ Tōhoku Main Line	for Morioka
2	■ Tōhoku Main Line	for Kitakami and Ichinoseki

== History ==
Shiwa-Chūō Station was opened on 14 March 1994.

== Passenger statistics ==
In fiscal 2018, the station was used by an average of 1546 passengers daily (boarding passengers only).

== Surrounding area ==
- National Route 4
- Kōriyama Castle

== See also ==
- List of railway stations in Japan
