= Hizume Station =

Railway station in Shiwa, Iwate Prefecture, Japan

Hizume Station 日詰駅
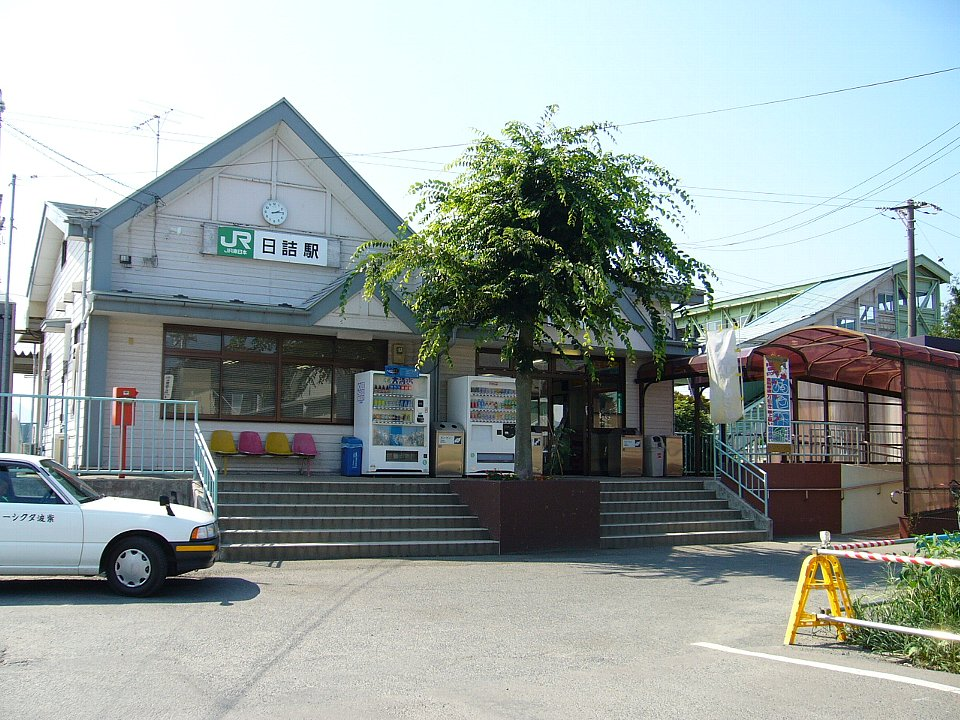
- Hizume Station, August 2006

General information
- Location: Kitahizume, Shiwa-cho, Shiwa-gun, Iwate-ken 028-3309; Japan
- Coordinates: 39.5383°N 141.1603°E
- Operator: JR East
- Line: ■ Tōhoku Main Line
- Distance: 516.9 km from Tokyo
- Platforms: 1 side +1 island platform
- Tracks: 3

Construction
- Structure type: At grade

Other information
- Status: Staffed (Midori no Madoguchi )
- Website: Official website

History
- Opened: 1 November 1890

Passengers
- FY2018: 515

Services
Preceding station	JR East	Following station
Ishidoriya towards Kuroiso	Tōhoku Main Line Local	Shiwa-Chūō towards Morioka
Location
- Location within Iwate Prefecture Location within Japan

Hizume Station (日詰駅, Hizume-eki) is a railway station in the town of Shiwa, Iwate Prefecture, Japan, operated by East Japan Railway Company (JR East).

== Lines ==
Hizume Station is served by the Tōhoku Main Line, and is located 516.9 rail kilometers from the terminus of the line at Tokyo Station.

== Station layout ==
The station has an island platform and a single side platform serving three tracks, connected to the station building by a footbridge. The station is staffed and has a Midori no Madoguchi ticket office.

=== Platforms ===
1	■ Tōhoku Main Line	for Kitakami and Ichinoseki
2	■ Tōhoku Main Line	for starting trains
3	■ Tōhoku Main Line	for Morioka

== History ==
Hizume Station was opened on 1 November 1890. The station was absorbed into the JR East network upon the privatization of the Japanese National Railways (JNR) on 1 April 1987.

== Passenger statistics ==
In fiscal 2018, the station was used by an average of 515 passengers daily (boarding passengers only).

== Surrounding area ==
- Kodō Nomura Memorial Museum

== See also ==
- List of railway stations in Japan
