= Shiwa, Iwate =

Town in Iwate Prefecture, Japan

Shiwa 紫波町
- Town
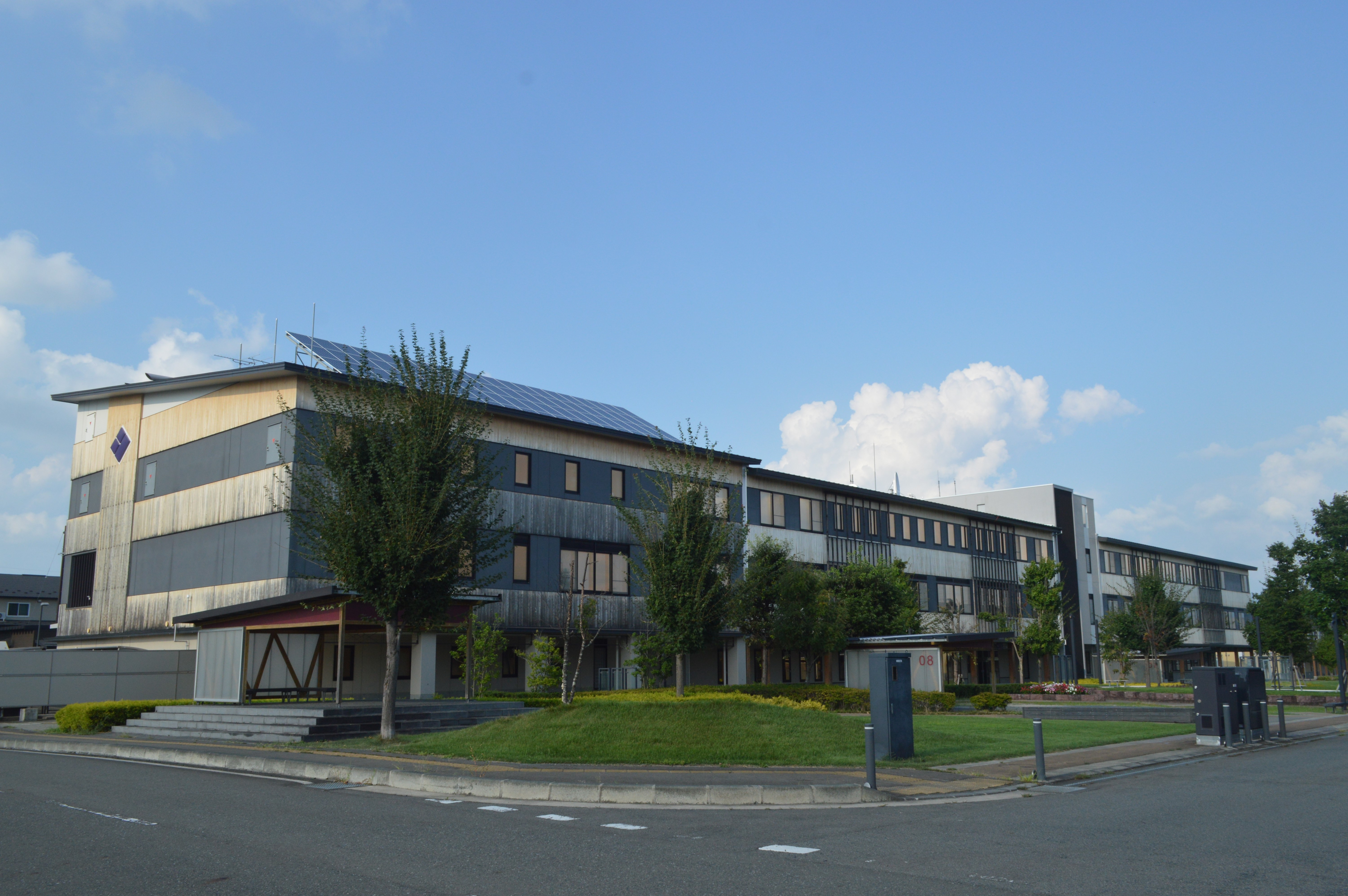
- Shiwa Town Hall

- Flag Seal

- Location of Shiwa in Iwate Prefecture

- Coordinates: 39°33′15.8″N 141°09′19.7″E
- Country: Japan
- Region: Tōhoku
- Prefecture: Iwate
- District: Shiwa

Area
  - Total: 238.98 km^{2} (92.27 sq mi)

Population (March 31, 2020)
  - Total: 33,090
  - Density: 138.5/km^{2} (358.6/sq mi)
- Time zone: UTC+9 (Japan Standard Time)
- Phone number: 019-672-2111
- Address: Hizume Nishiura 23-1 Shiwa-chō, Shiwa-gun, Iwate-ken 028-3390
- Climate: Cfa/Dfa
- Website: Official website
- Symbols
- Bird: Barn swallow
- Flower: Kikyō
- Tree: Keyaki

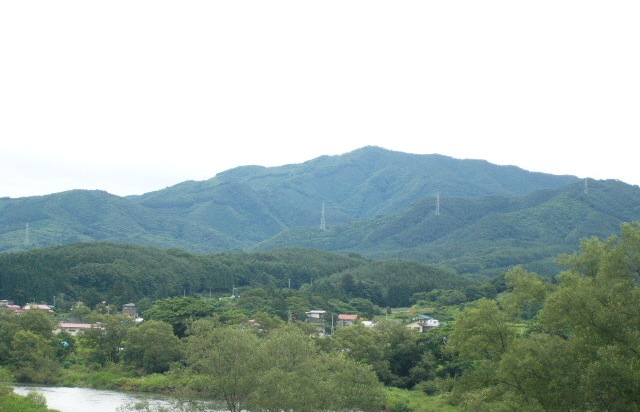
Mount Kuromoriyama in Shiwa

Shiwa (紫波町, Shiwa-chō) is a town in Iwate Prefecture, Japan. As of 31 March 2020, the town had an estimated population of 32,147 across 11,368 households, and a population density of 134 persons per km^{2}. The total area of the town is 238.98 square kilometres (92.27 sq mi).

== Geography ==
Shiwa is located in central Iwate Prefecture, in the Kitakami River basin, south of the prefectural capital of Morioka. The Sannōkai Dam is located in Shiwa. Kōriyama Castle is located along the banks of the Kitakami River in Shiroyama City Park.

=== Neighboring municipalities ===
Iwate Prefecture

- Hanamaki
- Morioka
- Shizukuishi
- Yahaba

=== Climate ===
Shiwa has a humid subtropical climate (Köppen climate classification Cfa) characterized by mild summers and cold winters. The average annual temperature in Shiwa is 10.3 °C. The average annual rainfall is 1326 mm with September as the wettest month and February as the driest month. The temperatures are highest on average in August, at around 24.0 °C, and lowest in January, at around -2.3 °C.

Climate data for Shiwa (1991−2020 normals, extremes 1976−present)
Month	Jan	Feb	Mar	Apr	May	Jun	Jul	Aug	Sep	Oct	Nov	Dec	Year
Record high °C (°F)	12.9 (55.2)	13.0 (55.4)	20.7 (69.3)	29.0 (84.2)	33.3 (91.9)	33.5 (92.3)	36.1 (97.0)	36.3 (97.3)	35.2 (95.4)	29.1 (84.4)	21.2 (70.2)	17.9 (64.2)	36.3 (97.3)
Mean daily maximum °C (°F)	1.7 (35.1)	2.8 (37.0)	7.4 (45.3)	14.4 (57.9)	20.1 (68.2)	23.8 (74.8)	26.9 (80.4)	28.2 (82.8)	24.1 (75.4)	17.9 (64.2)	10.9 (51.6)	4.2 (39.6)	15.2 (59.4)
Daily mean °C (°F)	−2.0 (28.4)	−1.3 (29.7)	2.4 (36.3)	8.5 (47.3)	14.4 (57.9)	18.6 (65.5)	22.2 (72.0)	23.3 (73.9)	19.1 (66.4)	12.6 (54.7)	6.1 (43.0)	0.5 (32.9)	10.4 (50.7)
Mean daily minimum °C (°F)	−5.9 (21.4)	−5.5 (22.1)	−2.1 (28.2)	2.9 (37.2)	9.1 (48.4)	14.2 (57.6)	18.5 (65.3)	19.4 (66.9)	14.9 (58.8)	7.7 (45.9)	1.7 (35.1)	−3.0 (26.6)	6.0 (42.8)
Record low °C (°F)	−16.9 (1.6)	−16.6 (2.1)	−11.6 (11.1)	−7.9 (17.8)	−0.7 (30.7)	3.9 (39.0)	8.7 (47.7)	10.3 (50.5)	4.0 (39.2)	−1.5 (29.3)	−6.9 (19.6)	−14.1 (6.6)	−16.9 (1.6)
Average precipitation mm (inches)	47.7 (1.88)	44.6 (1.76)	79.4 (3.13)	84.8 (3.34)	109.3 (4.30)	119.4 (4.70)	180.5 (7.11)	178.0 (7.01)	154.6 (6.09)	110.3 (4.34)	87.7 (3.45)	71.4 (2.81)	1,267.5 (49.90)
Average precipitation days (≥ 1.0 mm)	10.9	9.5	11.9	10.8	11.1	10.0	13.2	11.3	11.9	11.1	12.5	12.5	136.7
Mean monthly sunshine hours	100.0	111.4	151.4	176.2	191.6	166.9	133.7	155.0	130.3	136.6	117.1	95.1	1,665.1
Source: JMA

== Demographics ==
Per Japanese census data, the population of Shiwa has remained relatively steady over the past 70 years.

Historical population
Year	Pop.	±%
1920	22,831	—
1930	24,291	+6.4%
1940	25,361	+4.4%
1950	31,221	+23.1%
1960	29,327	−6.1%
1970	26,459	−9.8%
1980	27,787	+5.0%
1990	29,856	+7.4%
2000	33,038	+10.7%
2010	33,252	+0.6%
2020	32,147	−3.3%

== History ==
The area of present-day Shiwa was part of ancient Mutsu Province, and has been settled since at least the Jōmon period. The area was inhabited by the Emishi people, and came under the control of the imperial dynasty during the early Heian period. During the Kamakura period, the area was ruled by a branch of the Northern Fujiwara, followed by the Shiba clan during the Muromachi period. During the Sengoku period, the area was conquered by the Nambu clan in 1588. During the Edo period, Shiwa prospered as a post station on the Ōshū Kaidō highway connecting Edo with the northern provinces, as well as from its location on the Kitakami River. Initially part of Morioka Domain under the Tokugawa shogunate, from 1684, four villages (Tsuchidate, Katayose, Inato and Kamihirazawa) formed an exclave of Hachinohe Domain.

During the Meiji period, this exclave became the village of Shiwa, and the town of Hizume and the villages of Furudate, Mizuwake, Akaishi, Hikobe, Sahinai, Akasawa, and Nagaoka were established within Shiwa District on April 1, 1889 with the establishment of the modern municipalities system. These municipalities were merged on April 1, 1955 to form the new town of Shiwa.

== Government ==
Shiwa has a mayor-council form of government with a directly elected mayor and a unicameral city legislature of 18 members. Shiwa, and the town of Yahaba collectively contribute two seats to the Iwate Prefectural legislature. In terms of national politics, the city is part of Iwate 1st district of the lower house of the Diet of Japan.

== Economy ==
The local economy of Shiwa is traditionally based on agriculture, primarily rice cultivation, apples, grapes and cucumbers; however, due to its proximity to Morioka city, it is increasingly serving as a bedroom community.

== Education ==
Shiwa has eleven public elementary schools and three public junior high schools operated by the town government and one public high school operated by the Iwate Prefectural Board of Education.

== Transportation ==
=== Railway ===
East Japan Railway Company (JR East) - Tōhoku Main Line

- Hizume – Shiwachūō – Furudate

=== Highway ===
- Tōhoku Expressway – Takizawa Interchange
- National Route 4
- National Route 396
- National Route 456

== International relations ==
- Portage, Michigan, United States
- Southern Downs, Queensland, Australia

== Notable people from Shiwa ==
- Toru Yoshida, professional soccer player
