= Yahaba, Iwate =

Yahaba 矢巾町
- Town
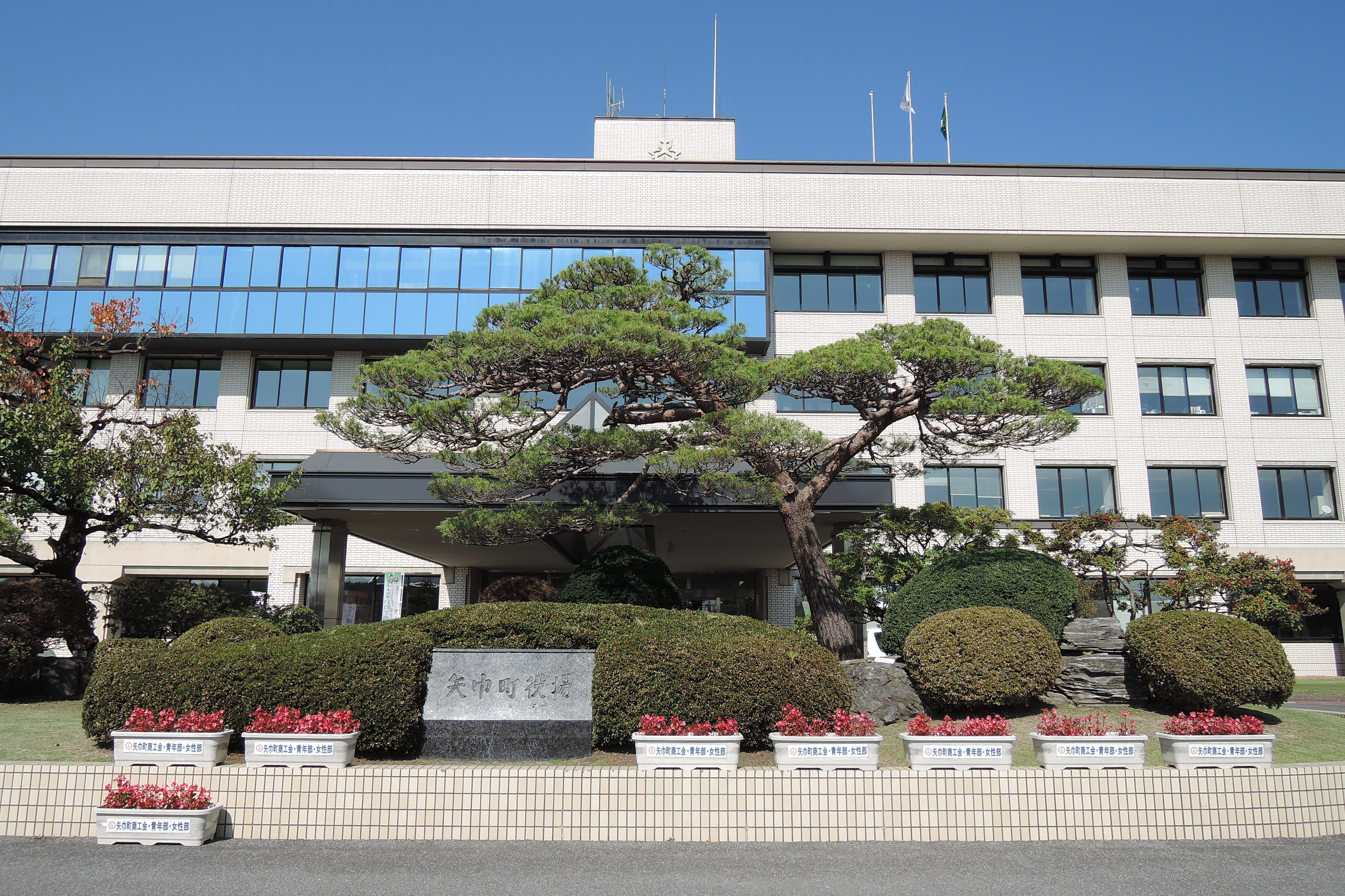
- Yahaba Town Hall

- Flag Seal

- Location of Yahaba in Iwate Prefecture

- Coordinates: 39°36′21.6″N 141°08′34.6″E
- Country: Japan
- Region: Tōhoku
- Prefecture: Iwate
- District: Shiwa

Area
  - Total: 67.32 km^{2} (25.99 sq mi)

Population (April 1, 2020)
  - Total: 27,227
  - Density: 404.4/km^{2} (1,047/sq mi)
- Time zone: UTC+9 (Japan Standard Time)
- Tree: Pine
- Flower: Lily
- Bird: Common cuckoo
- Phone number: 019-697-2111
- Address: 13-123 Minamiyahaba Yahaba-chō, Shiwa-gun, Iwate-ken 027-8501
- Website: Official website

Yahaba (矢巾町, Yahaba-chō) is a town in Iwate Prefecture, Japan. As of 1 April 2020, the town had an estimated population of 27,227, and a population density of 400 persons per km^{2} in 10,131 households. The total area of the town is 67.32 square kilometres (25.99 sq mi).

== Geography ==
Yahaba is located in central Iwate Prefecture, bordered by Morioka city to the north, Shiwa town to the south and Shizukuishi to the west.

=== Neighboring municipalities ===
Iwate Prefecture

- Morioka
- Shiwa
- Shizukuishi

=== Climate ===
Yahaba has a humid subtropical climate (Köppen climate classification Cfa) characterized by mild summers and cold winters. The average annual temperature in Yahaba is 10.1 °C. The average annual rainfall is 1341 mm with September as the wettest month and February as the driest month. The temperatures are highest on average in August, at around 23.8 °C, and lowest in January, at around -2.6 °C.

== Demographics ==
Per Japanese census data, the population of Yahaba has seen a long and steady increase over the past century.

Historical population
Year	Pop.	±%
1920	9,662	—
1930	10,759	+11.4%
1940	11,615	+8.0%
1950	13,832	+19.1%
1960	13,923	+0.7%
1970	13,526	−2.9%
1980	17,465	+29.1%
1990	19,920	+14.1%
2000	25,268	+26.8%
2010	27,262	+7.9%
2020	28,058	+2.9%

== History ==
The area of present-day Yahaba was part of ancient Mutsu Province, and has been settled since at least the Jōmon period. The area was inhabited by the Emishi people, and came under the control of the imperial dynasty during the early Heian period with the construction Tokutan Castle (徳丹城) a fortified settlement, by Sakanoue no Tamuramaro in 813 AD. During the Sengoku period, the area was dominated by various samurai clans before coming under the control of the Nambu clan during the late Sengoku period, who ruled Morioka Domain under the Edo period Tokugawa shogunate.

After the start of the Meiji period, the villages of Kemuyama, Tokuda and Fudo were established within Shiwa District by the establishment of the modern municipalities system on April 1, 1889. The three villages merged on March 1, 1955 to form Yahaba village, which was raised to town status on May 1, 1966.

== Government ==
Yahaba has a mayor-council form of government with a directly elected mayor and a unicameral city legislature of 18 members. Yahaba, and the town of Shiwa collectively contribute two seats to the Iwate Prefectural legislature. In terms of national politics, the city is part of Iwate 1st district of the lower house of the Diet of Japan.

== Economy ==
The local economy of Yahaba is traditionally based on agriculture, primarily rice cultivation. However, due to its proximity to Morioka, light industries and warehousing have been increasing in importance, and the town is increasingly becoming a bedroom community for Morioka.

== Education ==
Yahaba has four public elementary schools and two public junior high schools operated by the town government and two public high schools operated by the Iwate Prefectural Board of Education.

In addition, the College of Pharmacy of the Iwate Medical University is located in Yahaba.

== Transportation ==
=== Railway ===
East Japan Railway Company (JR East) -Tōhoku Main Line

- Yahaba

=== Highway ===
- Tōhoku Expressway – Yahaba IC
- National Route 4

== International relations ==
- Fremont, Michigan, United States, friendship city since July 22, 1995

== Local attractions ==
- Site of Tokutan Castle, a national historic site
