= Senbokuchō Station =

Railway station in Morioka, Iwate Prefecture, Japan

Senbokuchō Station 仙北町駅
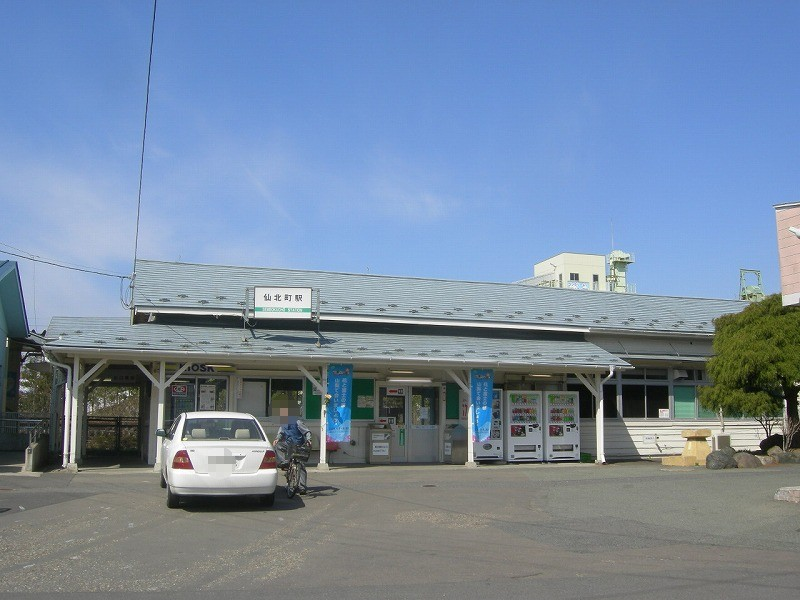
- Senbokuchō Station in April 2008

General information
- Location: 2-1-10 Senbokuchō, Morioka-shi, Iwate-ken 020-0861; Japan
- Coordinates: 39.6880°N 141.1486°E
- Operator: JR East
- Line: ■ Tōhoku Main Line
- Distance: 533.5 km from Tokyo
- Platforms: 2 side platforms
- Tracks: 2

Construction
- Structure type: At grade

Other information
- Status: Staffed (Midori no Madoguchi )
- Website: Official website

History
- Opened: 5 January 1915

Passengers
- FY2018: 1687

Services
Preceding station	JR East	Following station
Yahaba One-way operation	Tōhoku Main Line Rapid Aterui	Morioka Terminus
Iwate-Iioka towards Kuroiso	Tōhoku Main Line Local	Morioka Terminus
Location
- Location within Iwate Prefecture Location within Japan

Senbokuchō Station (仙北町駅, Senbokuchō-eki) is a railway station in the city of Morioka, Iwate Prefecture, Japan, operated by East Japan Railway Company (JR East).

== Lines ==
Senbokuchō Station is served by the Tōhoku Main Line, and is located 533.5 rail kilometers from the terminus of the line at Tokyo Station.

== Station layout ==
The station has a single island platform connected to the station building by a footbridge. The station has a Midori no Madoguchi staffed ticket office.

=== Platforms ===
1	■ Tōhoku Main Line	for Kitakami and Ichinoseki
2	■ Tōhoku Main Line	for Morioka

== History ==
Senbokuchō Station was opened on 5 January 1915. The station was absorbed into the JR East network upon the privatization of the Japanese National Railways (JNR) on 1 April 1987.

== Passenger statistics ==
In fiscal 2018, the station was used by an average of 1,687 passengers daily (boarding passengers only).

== See also ==
- List of railway stations in Japan
