= Shiwa Castle =

- 志波城
- Morioka, Iwate Prefecture, Japan
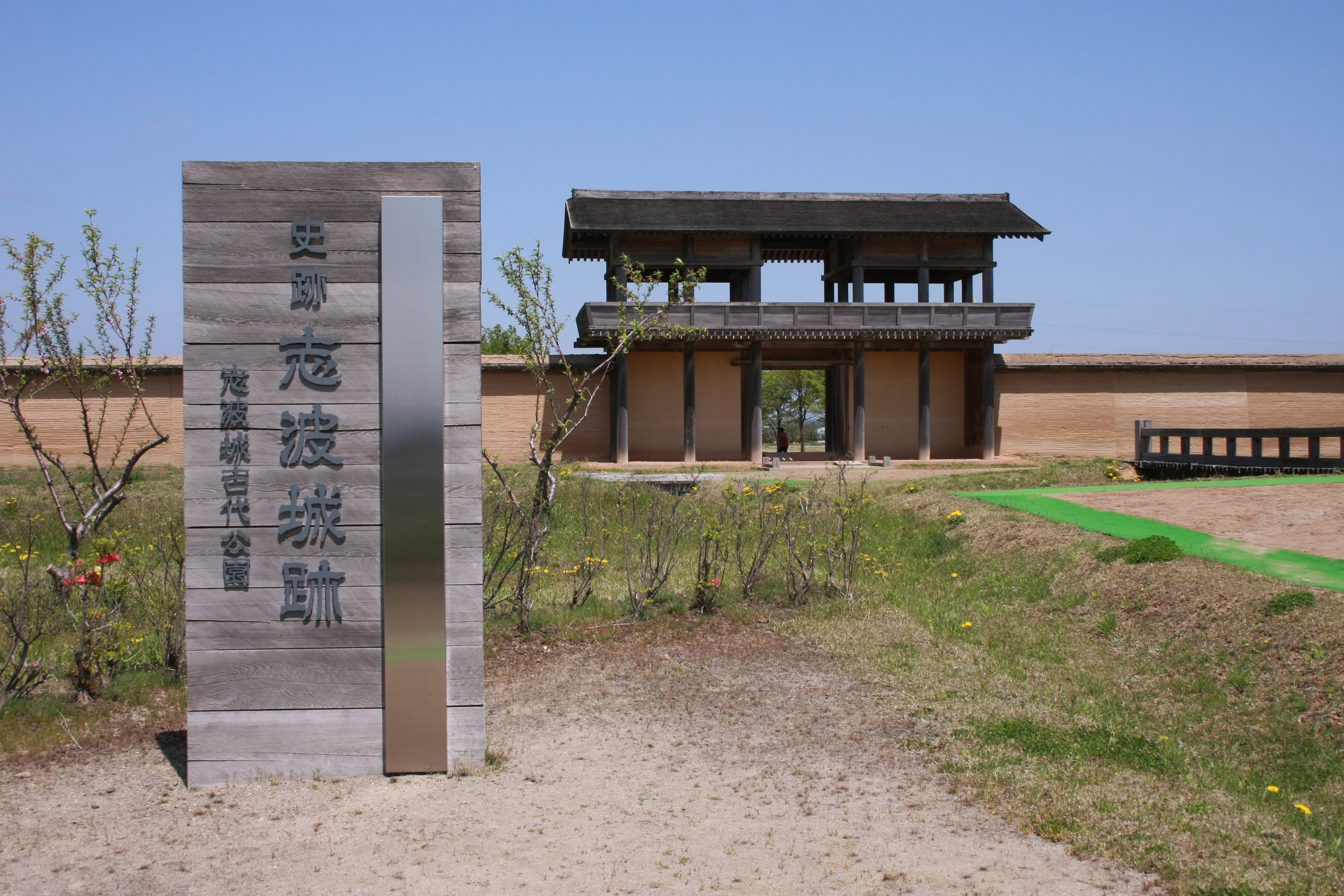
- reconstructed South Gate of Shiwa Castle

Site information
- Type: jōsaku-style Japanese castle
- Open to the public: yes
- Condition: partially reconstructed

Location
- Reconstructed Gate of Shiwa Castle Shiwa Castle (Japan)
- Coordinates: 39°41′10.5″N 141°06′23.0″E

Site history
- Built: AD 803; 1223 years ago
- Built by: Sakanoue no Tamuramaro
- In use: early Heian period
- Demolished: unknown

Shiwa Castle (志波城, Shiwa-jō) was an early Heian period jōsaku-style Japanese castle located in what is now part of the city of Morioka, Iwate Prefecture in the Tōhoku region of far northern Honshu, Japan. The site was proclaimed a National Historic Site of Japan in 1979.

== Background ==
In the late Nara period, after the establishment of a centralized government under the Ritsuryō system, the imperial court sent a number of military expeditions to what later was designated Mutsu Province in northern Japan to bring the local Emishi tribes under its control. The Emishi were able to successfully resist the Japanese for several decades; however, in 802 AD, the Chinjufu-shōgun Sakanoue no Tamuramaro defeated Emishi chieftain Aterui, and many of the Emishi tribes in the Shiwa District submitted to Japanese rule. In 803 AD, Shiwa Castle, a large fortification with wooden walls, was established in what later became part of the city of Morioka to serve as an administrative center of the imperial government. However, the site was prone to flooding, and in 811 AD, and Shiwa Castle was abandoned in favor of Tokutan Castle approximately ten kilometers to the south.

== Description ==
Shiwa Castle was a square enclosure, approximately 840 meters (2,760 ft) on each side, consisting of an earthen rampart surmounted by a wooden palisade, and protected by a dry moat measuring 980 meters (3,220 ft) on each side. There was a gate at the center of each side facing each of the cardinal directions, with yagura watchtowers were erected at 60-meter (200 ft) intervals. Within was a secondary palisade roughly 150 meters (490 ft) square, containing the 14 buildings making up the administrative compound. The palace compound was connected to the main south gate by a road 18 meters (59 ft) in width. From the size of the foundations of the barracks and workshops, the garrison was between 1200 and 2000 men.

== Current situation ==
A large scale archaeological investigation was conducted by the Iwate Prefectural Board of Education from 1976 to 1977, in conjunction with the construction of the nearby Tōhoku Expressway. In 1991, the city of Morioka completed reconstructions of the south gate and palisade, along with faux reconstructions of the government administrative structures, and opened the site to the public as the Shiwa Castle Ancient Park (志波城古代公園).

== See also ==
- Emishi
- Taga Castle
- List of Historic Sites of Japan (Iwate)
