= Yahaba Station =

Railway station in Yahaba, Iwate Prefecture, Japan

Yahaba Station 矢幅駅
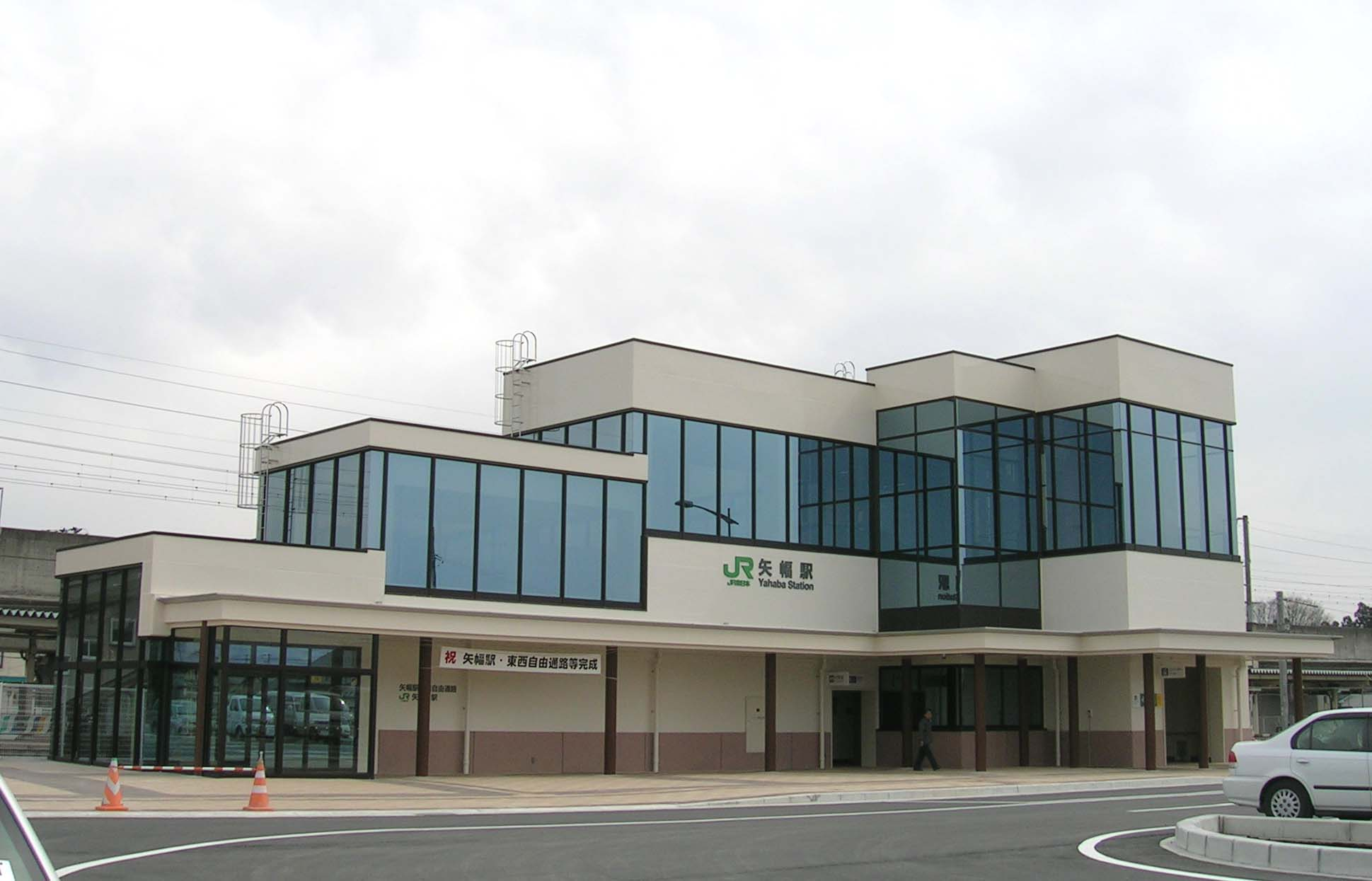
- Yahaba Station West Exit, March 2008

General information
- Location: Matahei Shinden, Yahaba-Mrachi, Shiwa-gun, Iwate-ken 028-3614; Japan
- Coordinates: 39.6132°N 141.1484°E
- Operator: JR East
- Line: ■ Tōhoku Main Line
- Distance: 525.1 km from Tokyo
- Platforms: 1 side + 1 island platform
- Tracks: 3

Other information
- Status: Staffed (Midori no Madoguchi )
- Website: Official website

History
- Opened: 1 September 1898

Passengers
- FY2018: 3024

Services
Preceding station	JR East	Following station
Hanamaki One-way operation	Tōhoku Main Line Rapid Aterui	Senbokuchō towards Morioka
Hanamaki Terminus	Tōhoku Main Line Rapid Hamayuri	Morioka Terminus
Furudate towards Kuroiso	Tōhoku Main Line Local	Iwate-Iioka towards Morioka
Location
- Location within Iwate Prefecture Location within Japan

Yahaba Station (矢幅駅, Yahaba-eki) is a railway station in the town of Yahaba, Iwate Prefecture, Japan, operated by East Japan Railway Company (JR East).

== Lines ==
Yahaba Station is served by the Tōhoku Main Line, and is located 525.1 rail kilometers from the terminus of the line at Tokyo Station.

== Station layout ==
The station has one side platform and one island platform. The platforms are elevated, with the station building located underneath. The station is adjacent to the elevated rails of the Tōhoku Shinkansen, although the Tōhoku Shinkansen does not stop here. The station is staffed and has a Midori no Madoguchi ticket office.

=== Platforms ===
1	■ Tōhoku Main Line	for Kitakami and Ichinoseki
2	■ Tōhoku Main Line	(not in normal use)
3	■ Tōhoku Main Line	for Morioka

== History ==
Yahaba Station was opened on 1 September 1898. The station building was rebuilt in March 1977. The station was absorbed into the JR East network upon the privatization of the Japanese National Railways (JNR) on 1 April 1987. A new elevated station building was completed in March 2009.

== Passenger statistics ==
In fiscal 2018, the station was used by an average of 3,024 passengers daily (boarding passengers only).

== Surrounding area ==
- Site of Tokutan Castle
- Yahaba Post Office

== See also ==
- List of railway stations in Japan
