= Iwate-Iioka Station =

Railway station in Morioka, Iwate Prefecture, Japan

Iwate-Iioka Station 岩手飯岡駅
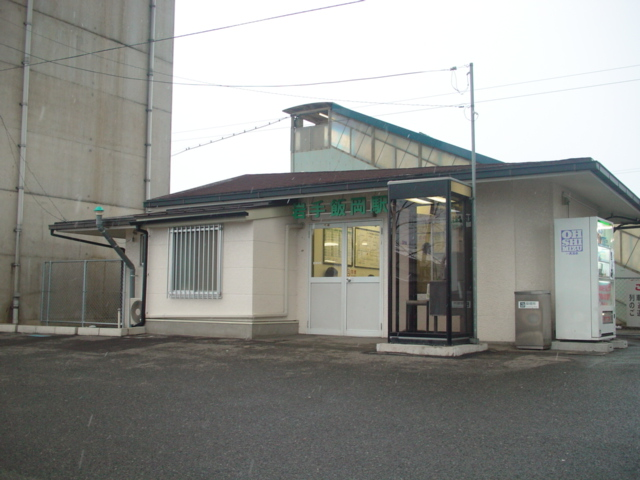
- Iwate-Iioka Station in January 2007

General information
- Location: Nagai 17 jiwari 53, Morioka-shi, Iwate-ken 020-0834; Japan
- Coordinates: 39.6535°N 141.1468°E
- Operator: JR East
- Line: ■ Tōhoku Main Line
- Distance: 529.6 km from Tokyo
- Platforms: 2 side platforms
- Tracks: 2

Construction
- Structure type: At grade

Other information
- Status: Staffed (Midori no Madoguchi )
- Website: Official website

History
- Opened: 1 September 1950

Passengers
- FY2018: 2341

Services
Preceding station	JR East	Following station
Yahaba towards Kuroiso	Tōhoku Main Line Local	Senbokuchō towards Morioka
Location
- Location within Iwate Prefecture Location within Japan

Iwate-Iioka Station (岩手飯岡駅, Iwate-Iioka-eki) is a railway station in the city of Morioka, Iwate Prefecture, Japan, operated by the East Japan Railway Company (JR East).

== Lines ==
Iwate-Iioka Station is served by the Tōhoku Main Line, and is located 529.6 rail kilometers from the terminus of the line at Tokyo Station.

== Station layout ==
The station has two opposed side platforms connected to the station building by a footbridge. The station has a Midori no Madoguchi staffed ticket office.

=== Platforms ===
1	■ Tōhoku Main Line	for Kitakami and Ichinoseki
2	■ Tōhoku Main Line	for Morioka

== History ==
Iwate-Iioka Station was opened on 1 September 1950. The station was absorbed into the JR East network upon the privatization of the Japanese National Railways (JNR) on 1 April 1987.

== Passenger statistics ==
In fiscal 2018, the station was used by an average of 2,391 passengers daily (boarding passengers only).

== Surrounding area ==
- former Tonan Village Hall
- Morioka Tonan Cultural Center
- Morioka Tonan City Library

== See also ==
- List of railway stations in Japan
