= Shiwa District, Iwate =

Rural district in Iwate Prefecture, Japan

- List of Provinces of Japan > Tōsandō > Rikuchū Province > Shiwa District
- Japan > Tōhoku region > Iwate Prefecture > Shiwa District

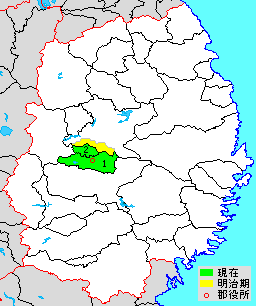
Map showing original extent of Shiwa District in Iwate Prefecture Current extent Extent during Meiji period District office

Location of Shiwa District in Iwate Prefecture

Shiwa (紫波郡, Shiwa-gun) is a rural district located in Iwate Prefecture, Japan.

As of June 1, 2019, the district has an estimated population of 60,203 and a density of 196.5 persons per km^{2}. The total area was 306.3 km^{2}.

The district consists of two towns:

- Shiwa
- Yahaba

== History ==
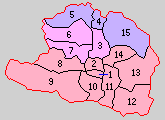
Historic Map of Shiwa District: Morioka City (5. Iioka; 4. Mimae; 15. Otobe; Yahaba Town (3. Tokuda; 6. Kemuyama; 7. Fudō) ; Shiwa Town (1. Hizume; 2. Furudate; 8. Mizuwake; 9. Shiwa; 10. Akaishi; 11. Hikobe; 12. Sahinai; 13. Akasawa; 14. Nagaoka)

=== Under Mutsu Province ===
Shiwa District was one of the six districts of northern Mutsu Province (六奥郡) created in the early Heian period after the conquest of the Kitakami River Valley from the Emishi tribes by the Japanese army led by General Sakanoue no Tamuramaro. The districts were named by Emperor Heizei. Shiwa District was part of the northern border of Japan until the Enkyu-Emishi War of 1070, which extended the frontier to the northern coast of Honshu. As with the rest of the region, the early history of Shiwa District is uncertain as are its borders, as Shiwa Castle is located in what is now Iwate District, indication that Shiwa District was originally much larger than its present area. The area came to be ruled by the Abe clan until the Former Nine Years War (1051-1063), followed by the Kiyohara clan until the Gosannen War (1083-1089) and the Northern Fujiwara until 1189. During the Muromachi period, the area was claimed by the Nanbu clan of northern Mutsu, but was ruled by the local Shiba clan until that clan was destroyed by the Nanbu in 1588.

Under the Tokugawa shogunate, Shiwa county consisted of 71 villages under the control of Morioka Domain and 4 villages under the control of Hachinohe Domain.

=== Early Meiji period ===
Following the Meiji restoration, Shiwa District came under Rikuchū Province and became part of Morioka Prefecture in 1871, with the exception of 4 villages which briefly became an exclave of Hachinohe Prefecture until absorbed into Morioka Prefecture as Shiwa Village a few months later. Morioka Prefecture became Iwate Prefecture in 1872.

== District Timeline ==
- 1955 - Kemuyama, Fudō and Tiokuda merge to form Yahaba village
- 1955 - Iioka, Minae and Otobe merge to form Tonan village
- 1955 - Hizume, Furudate, Mizuwake, Shiwa, Akaishi, Hikobe, Sahinai, Akasawa, Nagaoka merge to form Shiwa town
- 1992 - The village of Tonan merged into the city of Morioka.
