= Furudate Station =

Railway station in Shiwa, Iwate Prefecture, Japan

Furudate Station 古館駅
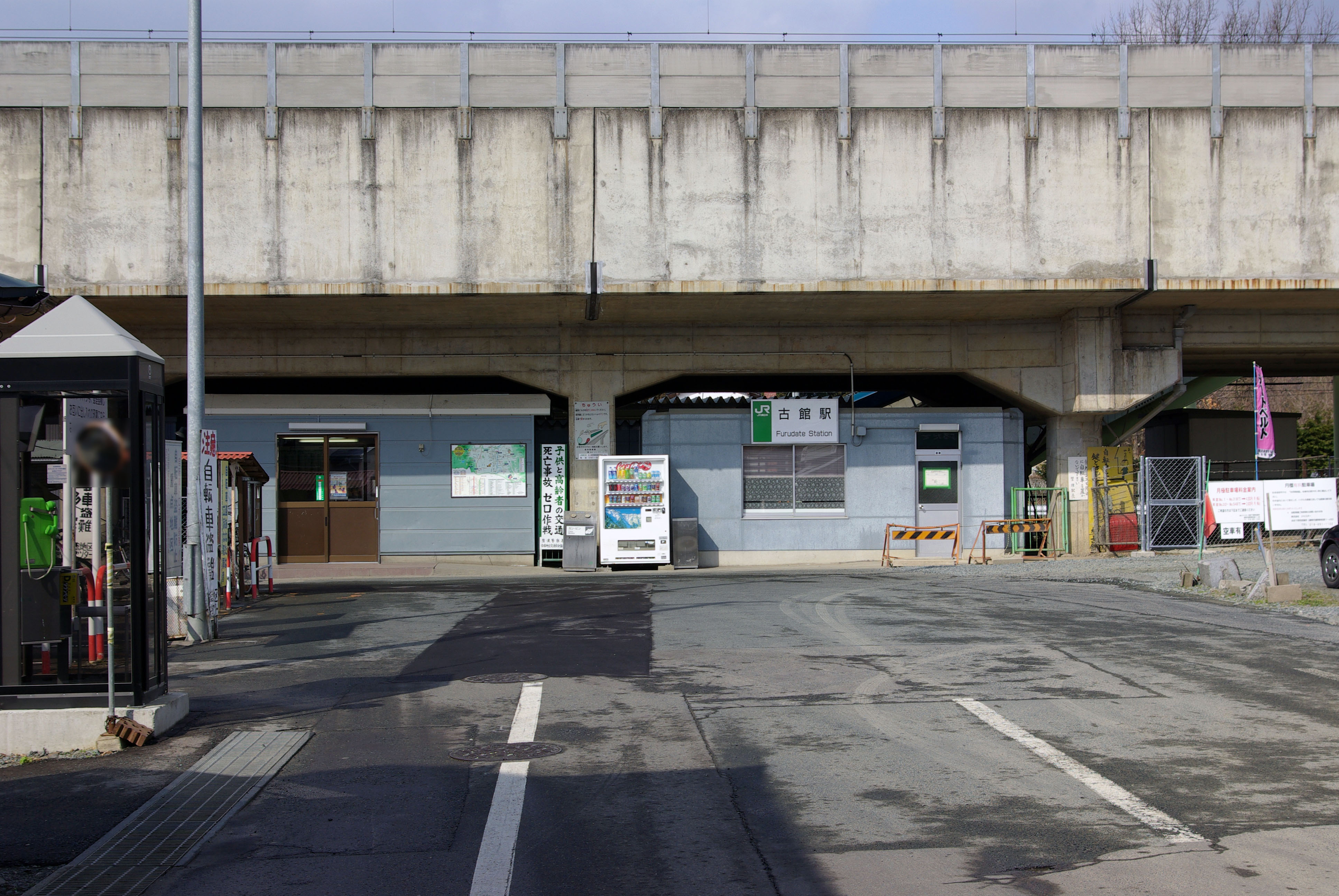
- Furudate Station, May 2009

General information
- Location: Nakajima, Shiwa-cho, Shiwa-gun, Iwate-ken 028-3301; Japan
- Coordinates: 39.5811°N 141.1546°E
- Operator: JR East
- Line: ■ Tōhoku Main Line
- Distance: 521.5 km from Tokyo
- Platforms: 2 side platforms
- Tracks: 2

Construction
- Structure type: At grade

Other information
- Status: Staffed (Midori no Madoguchi )
- Website: Official website

History
- Opened: 1 March 1949

Passengers
- FY2018: 725

Services
Preceding station	JR East	Following station
Shiwa-Chūō towards Kuroiso	Tōhoku Main Line Local	Yahaba towards Morioka
Location
- Location within Iwate Prefecture Location within Japan

Furudate Station (古館駅, Furudate-eki) is a railway station in the town of Shiwa, Iwate Prefecture, Japan, operated by the East Japan Railway Company (JR East).

== Lines ==
Furudate Station is served by the Tōhoku Main Line, and is located 521.5 rail kilometers from the terminus of the line at Tokyo Station.

== Station layout ==
The station has two opposed elevated side platforms with the station building is located underneath. The station is adjacent to the elevated rails of the Tōhoku Shinkansen, which does not stop at this station. The station is staffed and has a Midori no Madoguchi ticket office.

=== Platforms ===
1	■ Tōhoku Main Line	for Kitakami and Ichinoseki
2	■ Tōhoku Main Line	for Morioka

== History ==
Furudate Station was opened on 1 March 1949. The station was absorbed into the JR East network upon the privatization of the Japanese National Railways (JNR) on 1 April 1987.

== Passenger statistics ==
In fiscal 2018, the station was used by an average of 725 passengers daily (boarding passengers only).

== Surrounding area ==
- National Route 4

== See also ==
- List of railway stations in Japan
