= Kōriyama Castle (Iwate) =

Former castle in Shiwa, Iwate Prefecture, Japan

- 郡山城
- Shiwa, Iwate, Japan
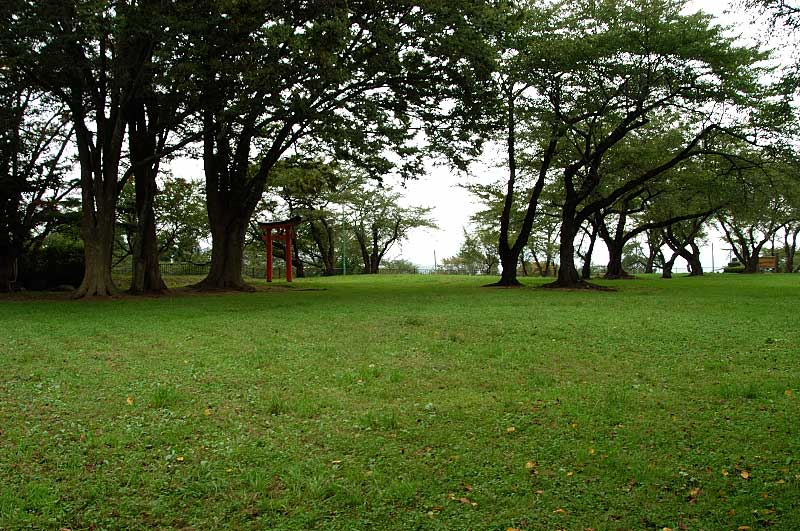
- Kōriyama/Kōsuiji Castle ruins site

Site information
- Type: Japanese castle
- Controlled by: Shiba clan; Nanbu clan
- Open to the public: yes
- Condition: Historical site; only parts of moats and some earthworks remain.

Location
- Coordinates: 39°33′55.1″N 141°10′22.4″E
- Area: 550 metres (1,800 ft) x 700 metres (2,300 ft)

Site history
- Built: 1335; 691 years ago
- In use: Kenmu Restoration – Edo period
- Demolished: 1667; 359 years ago

Kōriyama Castle (郡山城) was a castle in Shiwa, Iwate Prefecture, Japan. It was built in 1335 on a terrace overlooking Kitakami River for Shiba Ienaga, the son of Shiba Takatsune. Later occupants include Nakano Yasuzane after Nanbu Nobunao defeated the Shiba clan.

It has had multiple names over the years, including its original name, Kōsuiji Castle (高水寺城), as well as the Shiwa Imperial Palace or Shiba Imperial Palace (斯波御所, Shiwa Gojo or Shiba Gojo). The castle ruins are now within Shiroyama City Park in Shiwa. Only a number of dry moat sections and a few earthworks remain.

== Names of the castle ==
The name "Kōsuiji Castle" is based on the castle incorporating part of a Buddhist temple named Kōsuiji (高水寺, Kōsuiji), which was the oldest such temple in the region according to the Azuma Kagami. The location of the old temple is about 2 kilometres (1.2 mi) west of the former castle.

When the Shiba clan was at the height of its power, it was known as the "Shiwa Imperial Palace" (or "Shiba Imperial Palace"). Nanbu Nobunao renamed it to "Kōriyama Castle" in 1588.

== History ==
Kōsuiji Castle was commissioned in 1335, near the end of the Kenmu Restoration, by Ashikaga Takauji as a gift for Shiba Ienaga, the son of Shiba Takatsune. Ienaga was killed three years later at the Battle of Sugimoto Castle at the age of 17.

In 1588, Nanbu Nobunao seized the castle and its surroundings after defeating the Shiba clan in the area, renamed it "Kōriyama Castle", and appointed Nakano Yasuzane (中野康実) to govern the area from the castle.

== Site ==
The Kōriyama Castle site is located on a terrace within Shiroyama City Park in Shiwa, and is about 550 metres (1,800 ft) from east to west and 700 metres (2,300 ft) from north to south. The Kitakami River flows along the east side of Shiroyama City Park.

The Shiwagun Senki—a contemporary chronicle of the military history of the Shiwa clan—stated that the castle was "known for the large river Kitakami River in front of it [and] a deep moat on both sides, so large that even the dragon king could live there." Only a number of dry moat sections and a few earthworks remain, including the traces of the main castle building walls and traces of some secondary building walls.

Many of the ruins have been altered and damaged over the years, and parts of the double and triple moat system can be seen on most sides. The eastern side of the ruins end at a steep cliff.
