= Nakatsu River =

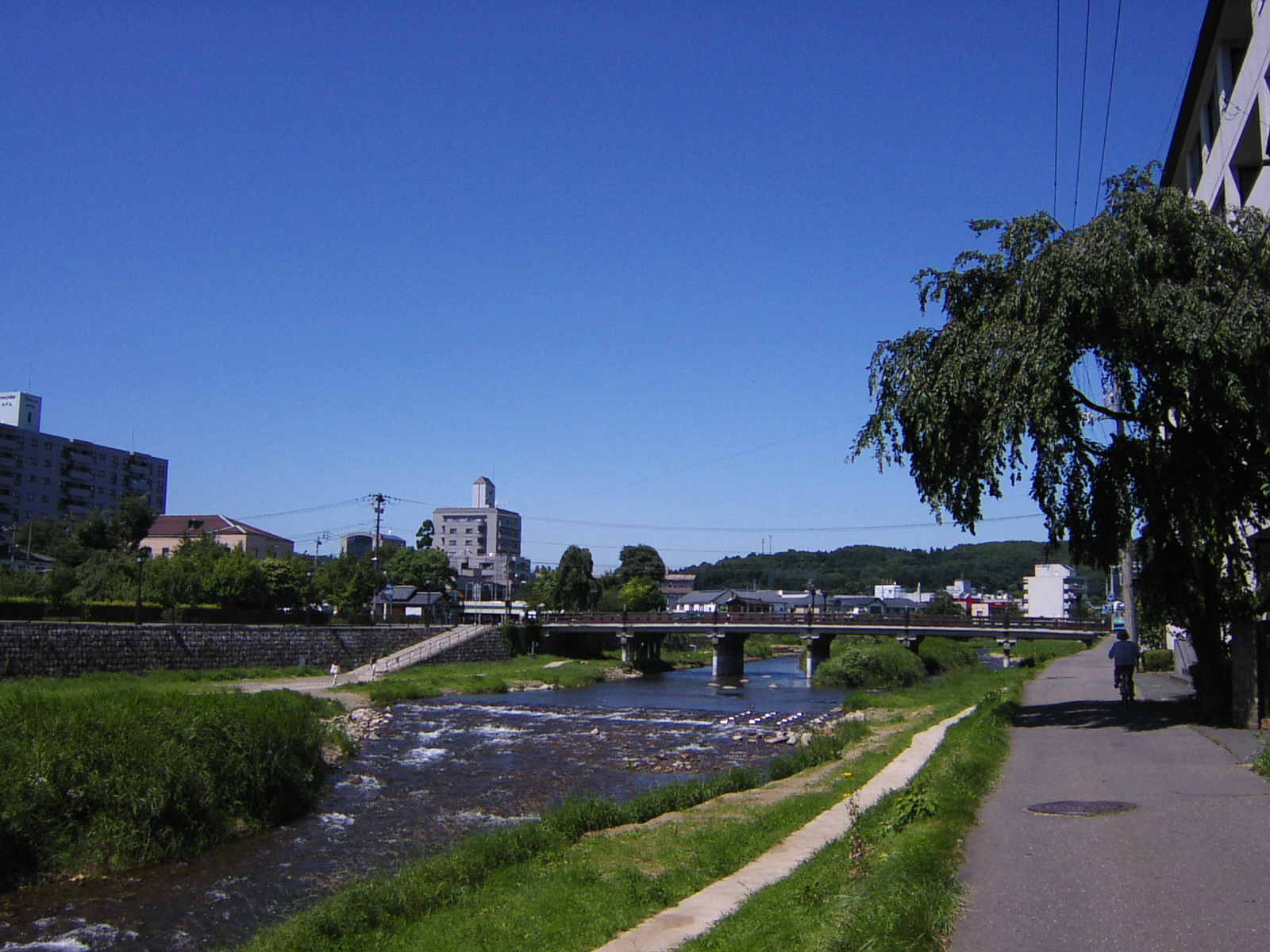
- Nakatsu River in Morioka

- Location within Japan
- Native name: 中津川 (Japanese)

Location
- Country: Japan

Physical characteristics
- Source
  - location: Kitakami Mountains, Iwate
- Mouth: Morioka, Iwate
  - location: Kitakami River
  - coordinates: 39°41′44″N 141°08′39″E
  - elevation: 115 m (377 ft)
- Length: 34.5 km (21.4 mi)
- Basin size: 208 km^{2} (80 sq mi)

The Nakatsu River (中津川, Nakatsu-gawa) is a river in Iwate Prefecture, Japan. It flows through the city of Morioka, where it enters the Kitakami River.
