= Kyukitakami River =

River in Miyagi Prefecture, Japan

Coordinates: 38°24′38″N 141°18′47″E

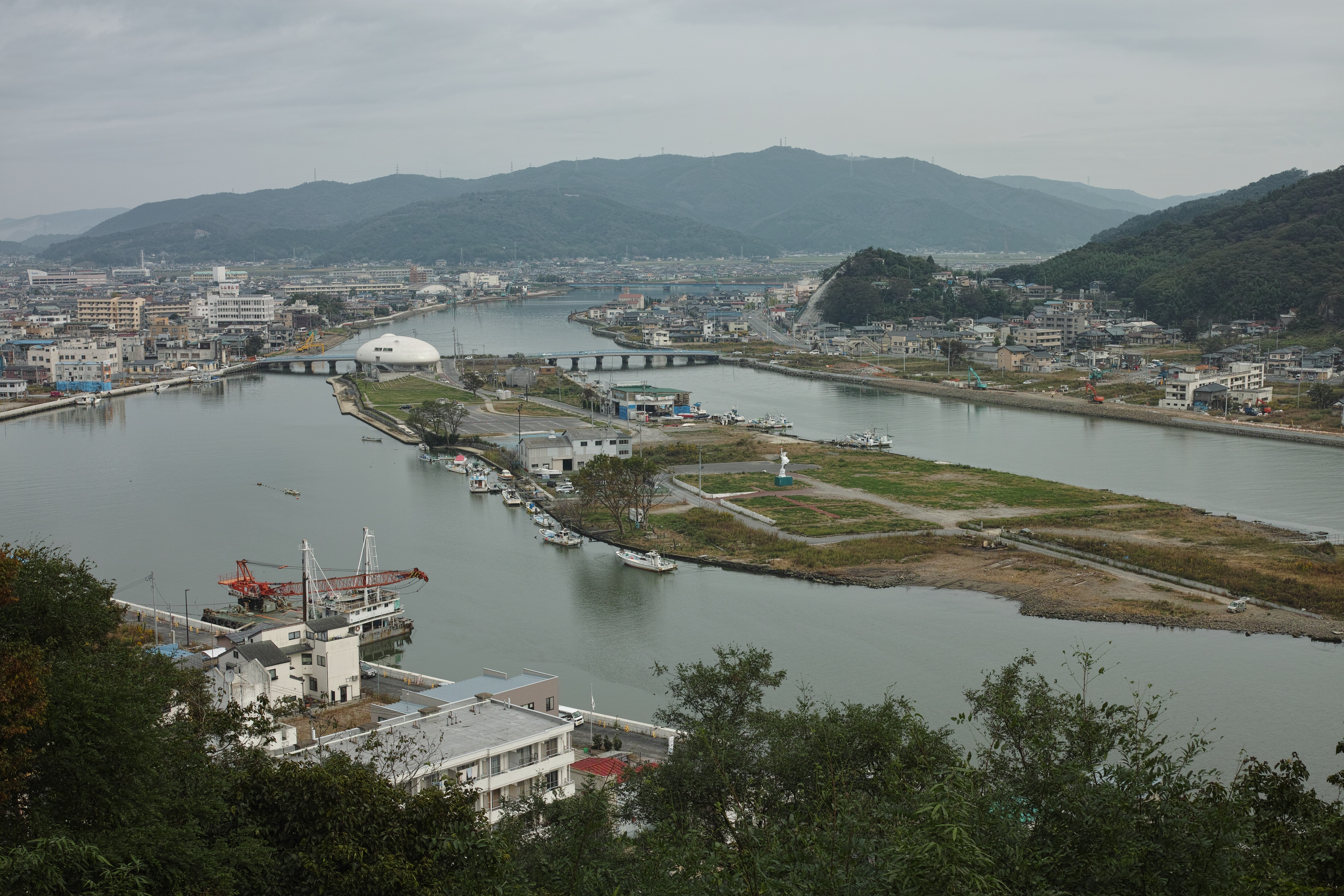

Kyukitakami River (Japanese:旧北上川) is natural fresh water river flowing in north–south direction near Ishinomaki city in Miyagi Prefecture of Japan. The eastern region of the river was damaged by Great East Japan Earthquake in 2011. It drains to the North Pacific Ocean.
