= Typhoon Kathleen =

Pacific typhoon in 1947

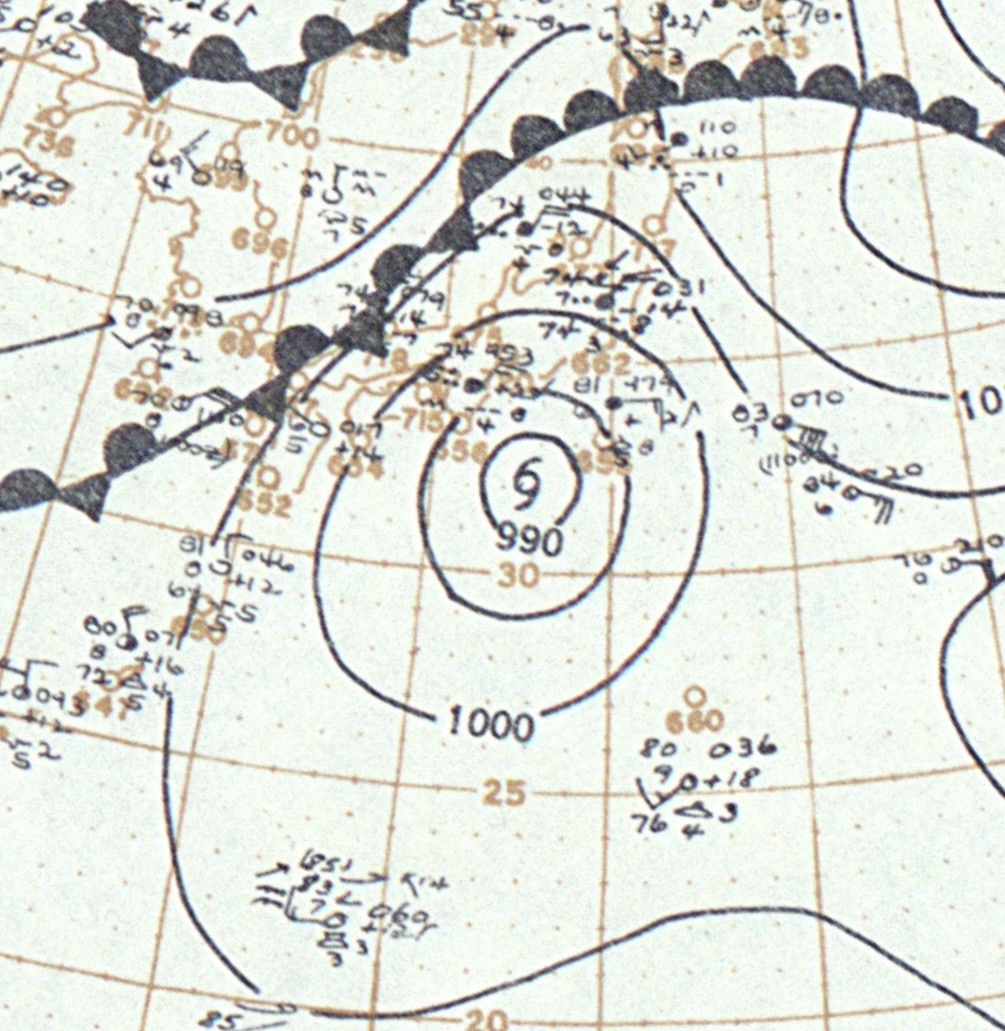
- Weather map of Typhoon Kathleen approaching Japan on September 14

Meteorological history
- Formed: September 10, 1947
- Dissipated: September 15, 1947

Typhoon
- 10-minute sustained (JMA)
- Lowest pressure: 960 hPa (mbar); 28.35 inHg

Category 2-equivalent typhoon
- 1-minute sustained (SSHWS/JTWC)
- Highest winds: 165 km/h (105 mph)

Overall effects
- Fatalities: 1,077
- Missing: 853
- Areas affected: Japan
- IBTrACS
- Part of the 1947 Pacific typhoon season

Typhoon Kathleen was a typhoon that approached Japan in September 1947. Kathleen brought record heavy rain at the time, causing major destruction in the Kanto region.

== Meteorological history ==
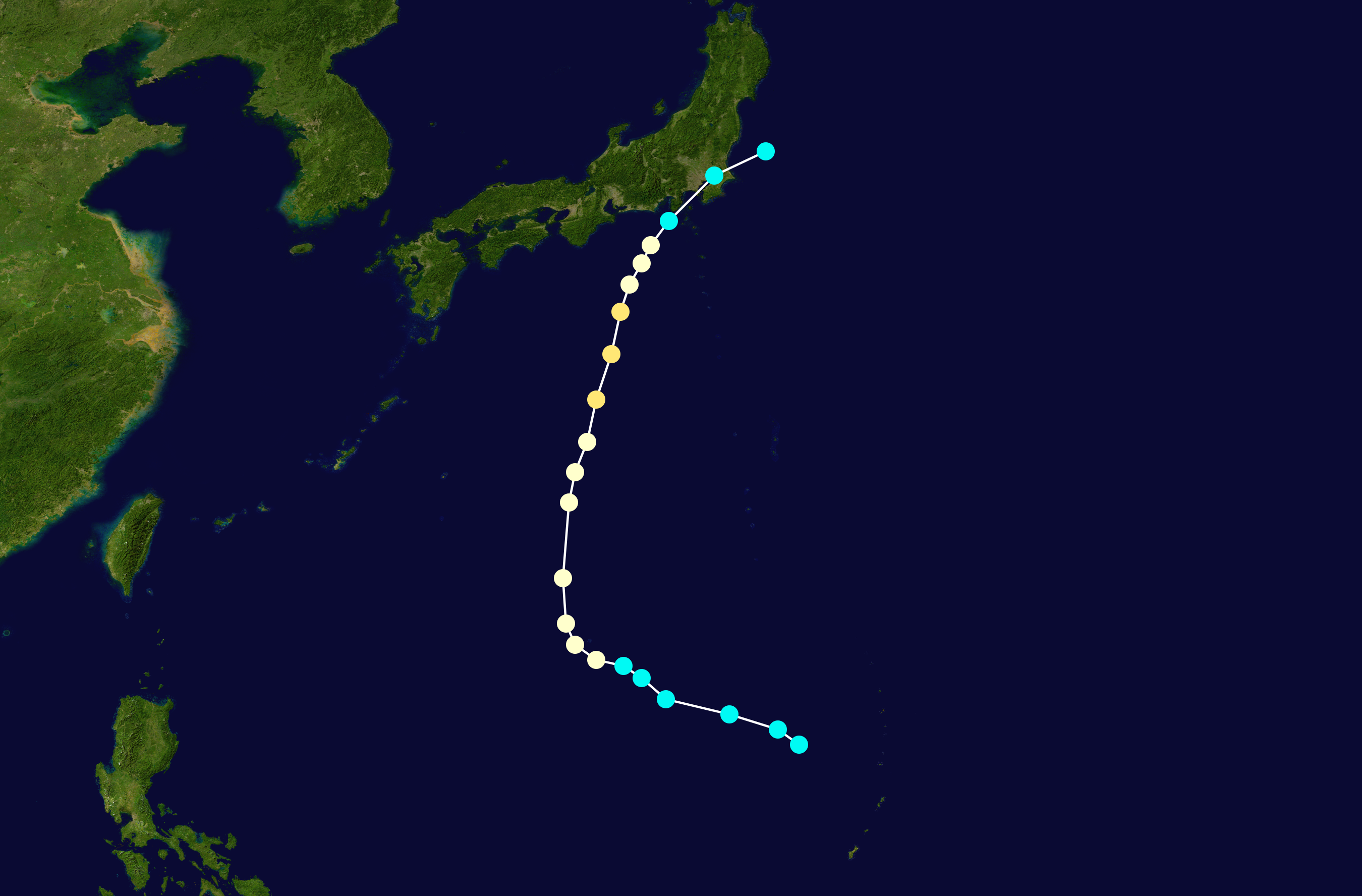
Map plotting the storm's track and intensity, according to the Saffir–Simpson scale Map key Saffir–Simpson scale Tropical depression (≤38 mph, ≤62 km/h) Tropical storm (39–73 mph, 63–118 km/h) Category 1 (74–95 mph, 119–153 km/h) Category 2 (96–110 mph, 154–177 km/h) Category 3 (111–129 mph, 178–208 km/h) Category 4 (130–156 mph, 209–251 km/h) Category 5 (≥157 mph, ≥252 km/h) Unknown Storm type Tropical cyclone Subtropical cyclone Extratropical cyclone, remnant low, tropical disturbance, or monsoon depression

Kathleen struck the Boso Peninsula and the entire Kanto Region in Japan on September 15. Frontal activity, which had been stagnant in the vicinity of Japan due to the typhoon, became active, causing heavy rainfall in the Kanto and Tohoku regions.

== Impact ==
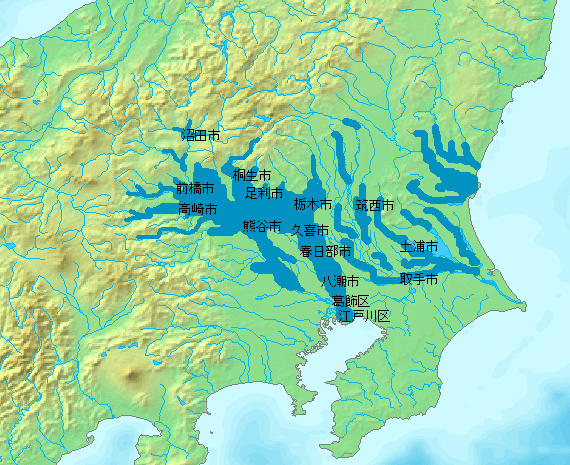
Flooded area

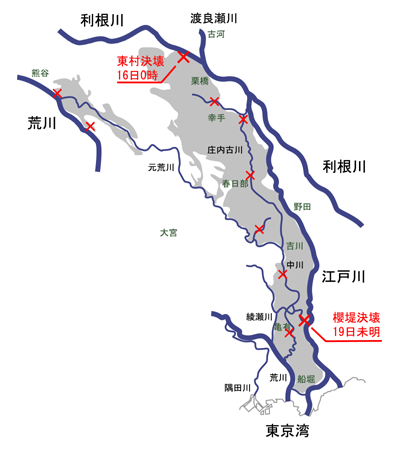
Flood range and major collapse points

Heavy rains caused the Arakawa River and Tone River to overflow. The areas of Tokyo, Gunma, Saitama, Tochigi, Ibaraki and Chiba suffered severe flood damage. In Gunma and Tochigi prefectures, debris flow and flooding of rivers occurred one after another, resulting in around 2,000 deaths in both prefectures. Also, in the Tohoku region, the Kitakami River flooded, causing major damage at Ichinoseki City in Iwate Prefecture.

The resulting floods killed at least 1,692 people and left many more missing.

Effects of Typhoon Kathleen

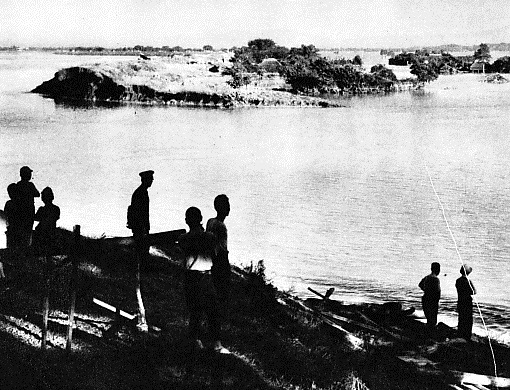
Kathleen damage (Saitama)

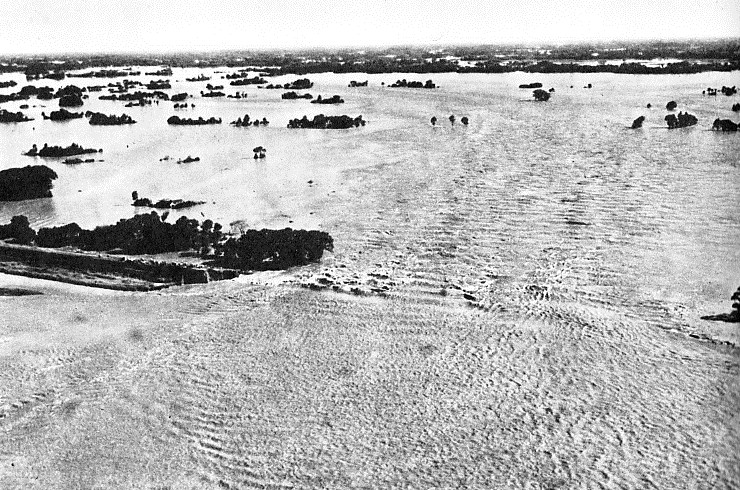
Kathleen damage (Saitama)

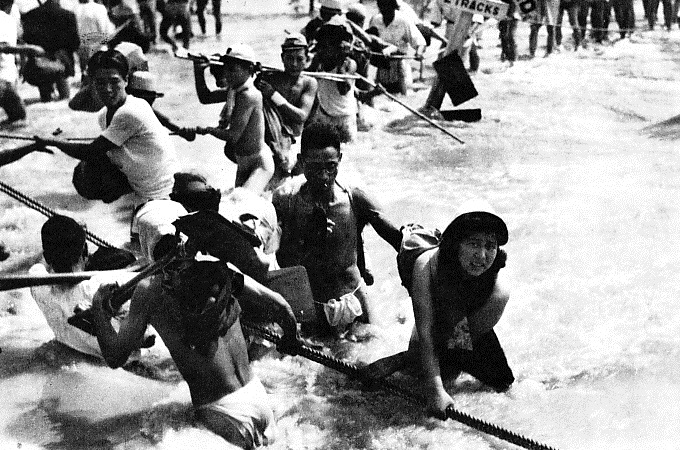
Kathleen damage (Tokyo)

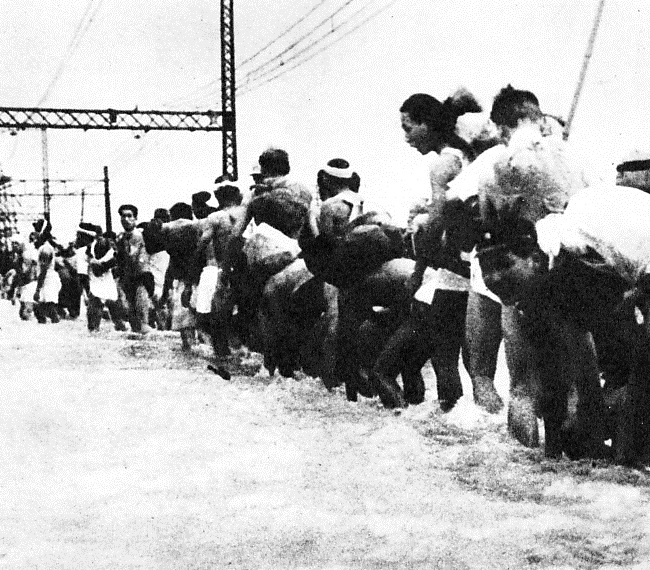
Kathleen damage (Tokyo)

== Aftermath ==
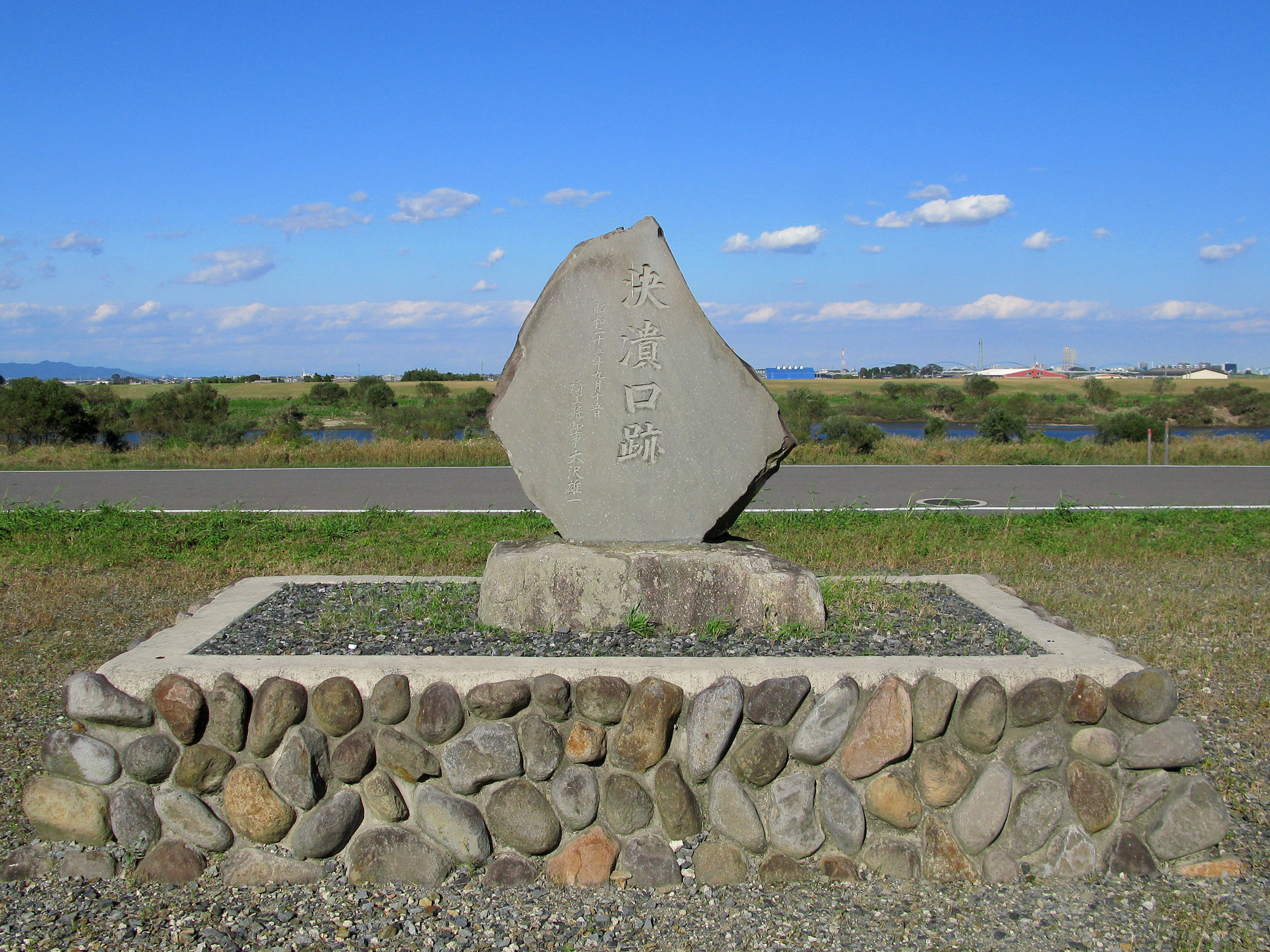
Tone River Embankment Collapse Monument (Kazo City, Saitama Prefecture)

There is a memorial built for the victims of typhoon at Kazo City, Saitama Prefecture.
