= Mount Nanashigure =

Mountain in Hachimantai, Iwate prefecture, Japan

Coordinates: 40.0706°N 141.1094°E

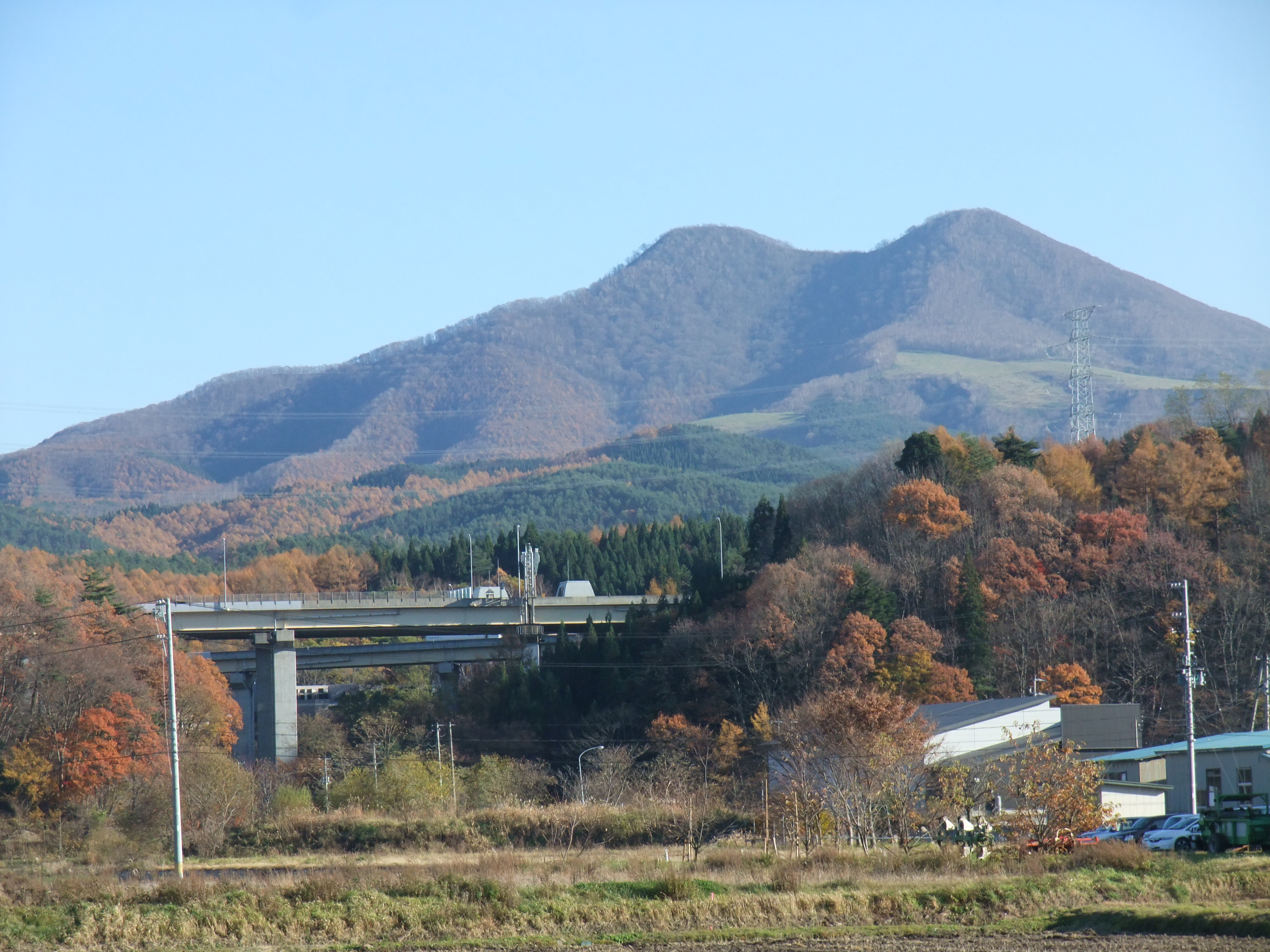
Mount Nanashigure

Mount Nanashigure (七時雨山, Nanashigure Yama) is a mountain in northwestern Iwate with an elevation of 1,063 metres (3,488 ft).
