= Kitakami River =

Coordinates: 38°34′36″N 141°27′36″E

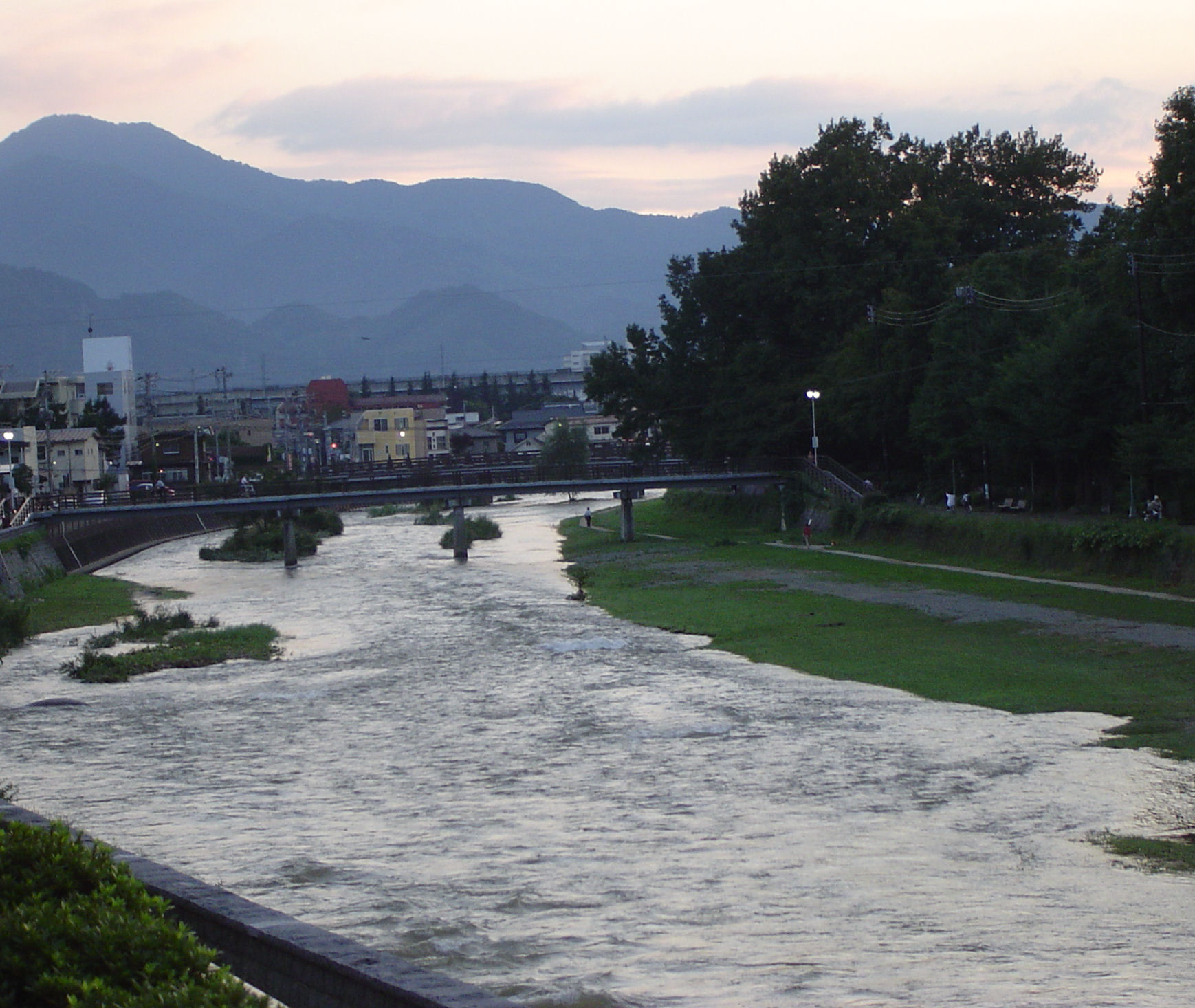
- The Kitakami River in Morioka

- Location within Japan
- Native name: 北上川 (Japanese)

Location
- Country: Japan

Physical characteristics
- Source
  - location: Mt. Nanashigure
- Mouth
  - location: Pacific Ocean
  - elevation: 0 m (0 ft)
- Length: 249 km (155 mi)
- Basin size: 10,150 km^{2} (3,920 sq mi)
- Discharge
  - average: 391 m^{3}/s (13,800 cu ft/s)

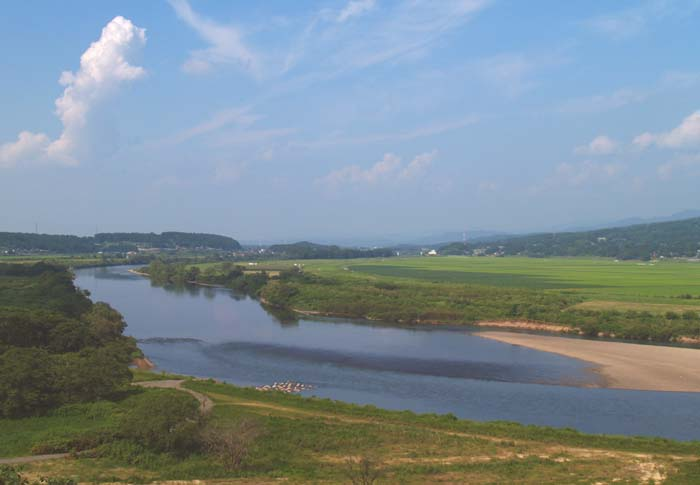
View of the Kitakami River looking north from the Takadachi Gekido in Hiraizumi, Iwate

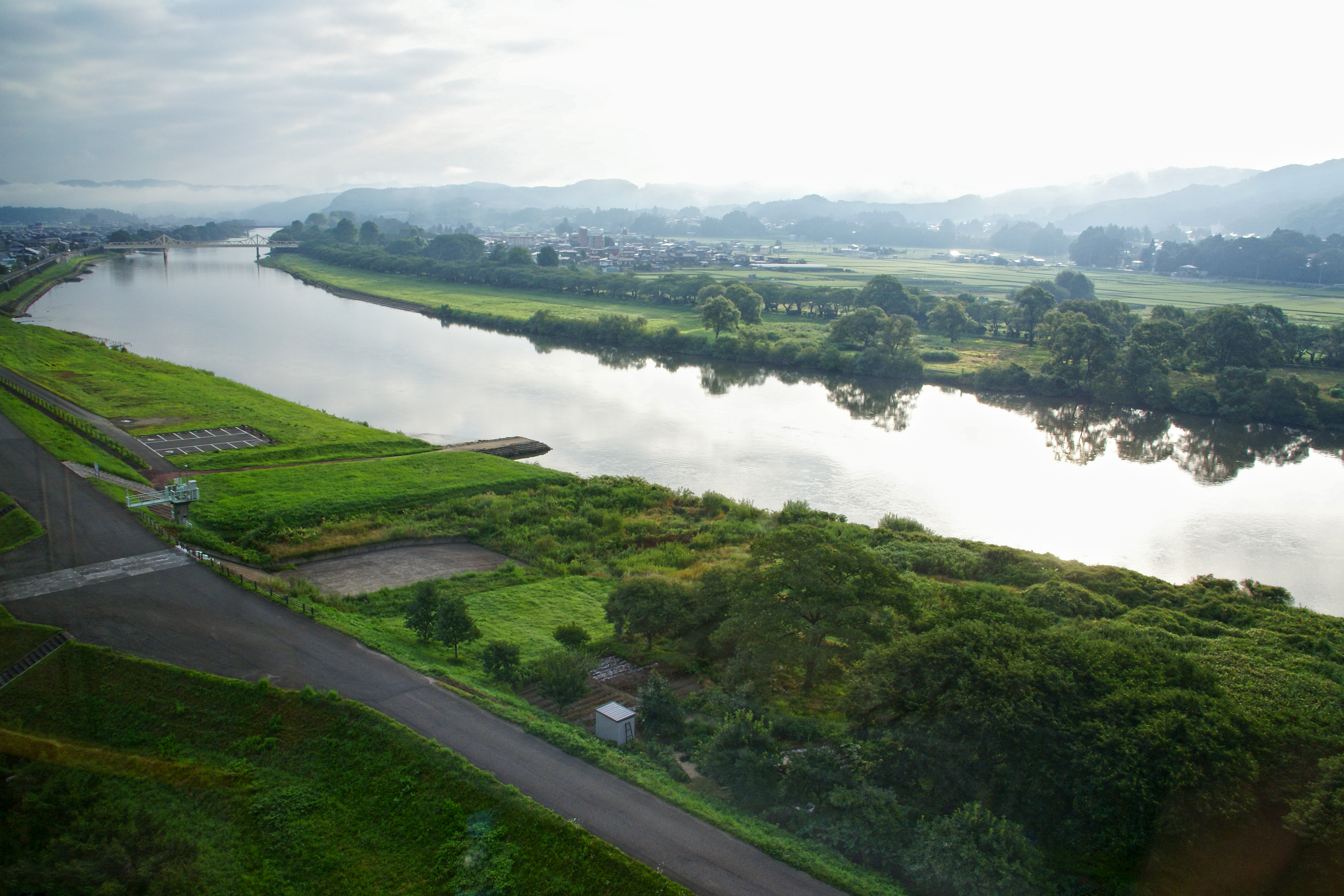
The Kitakami river flowing through Kitakami, Iwate

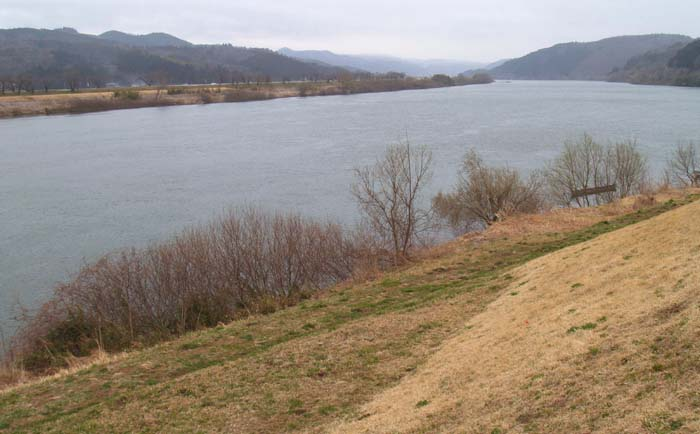
View of the Kitakami River looking south in Tome, Miyagi

The Kitakami River (北上川, Kitakami-gawa) is the fourth largest river in Japan and the largest in the Tōhoku region. The Class A river is 249 kilometres (155 mi) long and drains an area of 10,150 square kilometres (3,920 sq mi). It flows through mostly rural areas of Iwate and Miyagi Prefectures. The source of the river is the Mount Nanashigure in northern Iwate, from which it flows to the south between the Kitakami Mountains and the Ōu Mountains. The river is unusual in that it has two mouths, one - called Kyukitakami River - flowing south into Ishinomaki Bay and the other flowing east into the Pacific Ocean, both in Ishinomaki City.

The Kitakami river was an important transportation route during the Edo period and before the building of railways in the early Meiji period. Numerous dams have been constructed on the river and its tributaries from the Taishō and Shōwa periods for hydroelectric power generation, flood control and irrigation. However, another unusual feature is that there are no dams from its mouth to the Shijūshida Dam north of Morioka. This allows for a spectacular salmon run every fall.

== Tributaries ==
In Iwate Prefecture from north to south showing from which direction the water flows and the city where it empties into the Kitakami River.

- Tanto-gawa - from the east (Iwate)
- Matsu-gawa - from the west (Hachimantai)
- Nakatsu River - from the east (Morioka)
- Shizukuishi River - from the west (Morioka)
- Iwasaki-gawa - from the west (Shiwa)
- Takina-gawa - from the west (Shiwa)
- Kuzumaru-gawa - from the west (Hanamaki)
- Hienuki-gawa - from the east (Hanamaki)
- Sarugaishi River - from the east (Hanamaki)
- Se-gawa - from the west (Hanamaki)
- Toyosawa-gawa - from the west (Hanamaki)
- Waga River - from the west (Kitakami)
- Isawa River - from the west (Ōshū)
- Hirose-gawa - from the east (Ōshū)
- Hitokabe-gawa - from the east (Ōshū)
- Koromo-gawa - from the west (Hiraizumi)
- Iwai-gawa - from the west (Ichinoseki)
- Kitetsu-gawa - from the north (Ichinoseki)
- Senmaya-gawa - from the east (Ichinoseki)
- Kinomi-gawa - from the east (Fujisawa)
- Kinryu-gawa - from the west (Ichinoseki)

== See also ==
- Japanese cruiser Kitakami
- Kōriyama Castle, a few kilometers north of the confluence with the Takina River
