= Wakasennin Station =

Railway station in Kitakami, Iwate Prefecture, Japan

Wakasennin Station 和賀仙人駅
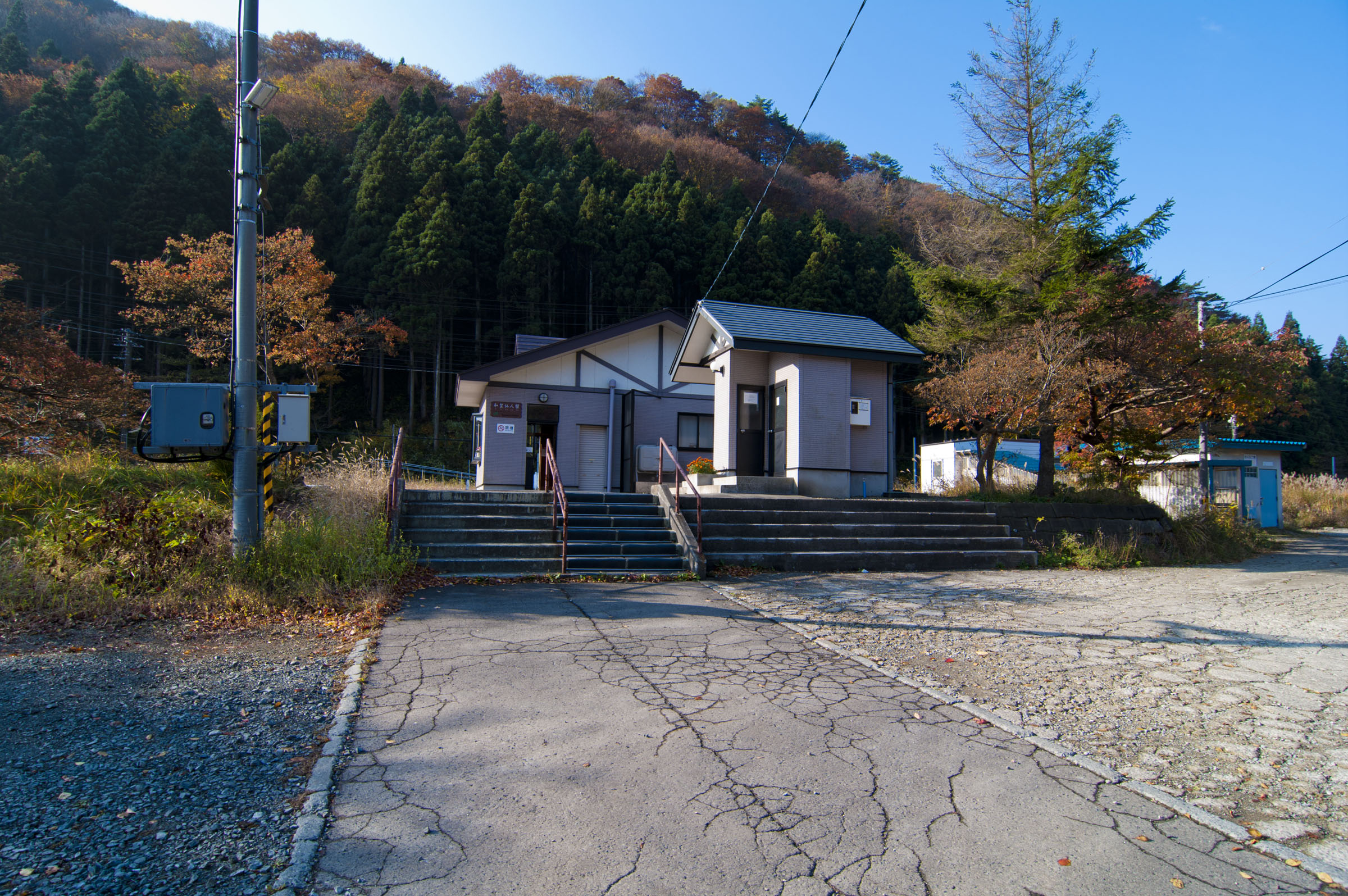
- Wakasennin Station

General information
- Location: Waga-cho Sennin 7-Jiwari 18, Kitakami-shi, Iwate-ken 024-0326; Japan
- Coordinates: 39.3088°N 140.9095°E
- Operator: JR East
- Line: ■ Kitakami Line
- Distance: 20.3 km from Kitakami
- Platforms: 1 island platform
- Tracks: 2

Construction
- Structure type: At grade

Other information
- Status: Unstaffed
- Website: Official website

History
- Opened: November 18, 1921

Services
Preceding station	JR East	Following station
Yudakinshūko towards Yokote	Kitakami Line Rapid; Local	Iwasawa towards Kitakami
Location
- Location within Iwate Prefecture Location within Japan

Wakasennin Station (和賀仙人駅, Wakasennin-eki) is a railway station located in the city of Kitakami, Iwate Prefecture, Japan, operated by the East Japan Railway Company (JR East).

== Lines ==
Wakasennin Station is served by the Kitakami Line, and is located 20.3 km from the terminus of the line at Kitakami Station.

== Station layout ==
The station has a single island platform connected to the station building by a level crossing. The station is unattended.

=== Platforms ===
1	■ Kitakami Line	for Fujine and Kitakami
2	■ Kitakami Line	for Hottoyuda and Yokote

== History ==
Wakasennin Station opened on November 18, 1921 as a station on the now-defunct Yokoguro Line. With the construction of Yuda Dam in late 1962, the line was re-routed to become part of the Kitakami Line. The station was absorbed into the JR East network upon the privatization of the Japan National Railways (JNR) on April 1, 1987. A new station building was completed in 1999.

== Surrounding area ==
- National Route 107

== See also ==
- List of railway stations in Japan
