= Hiraishi Station (Akita) =

Railway station in Yokote, Akita Prefecture, Japan

Hiraishi Station 平石駅
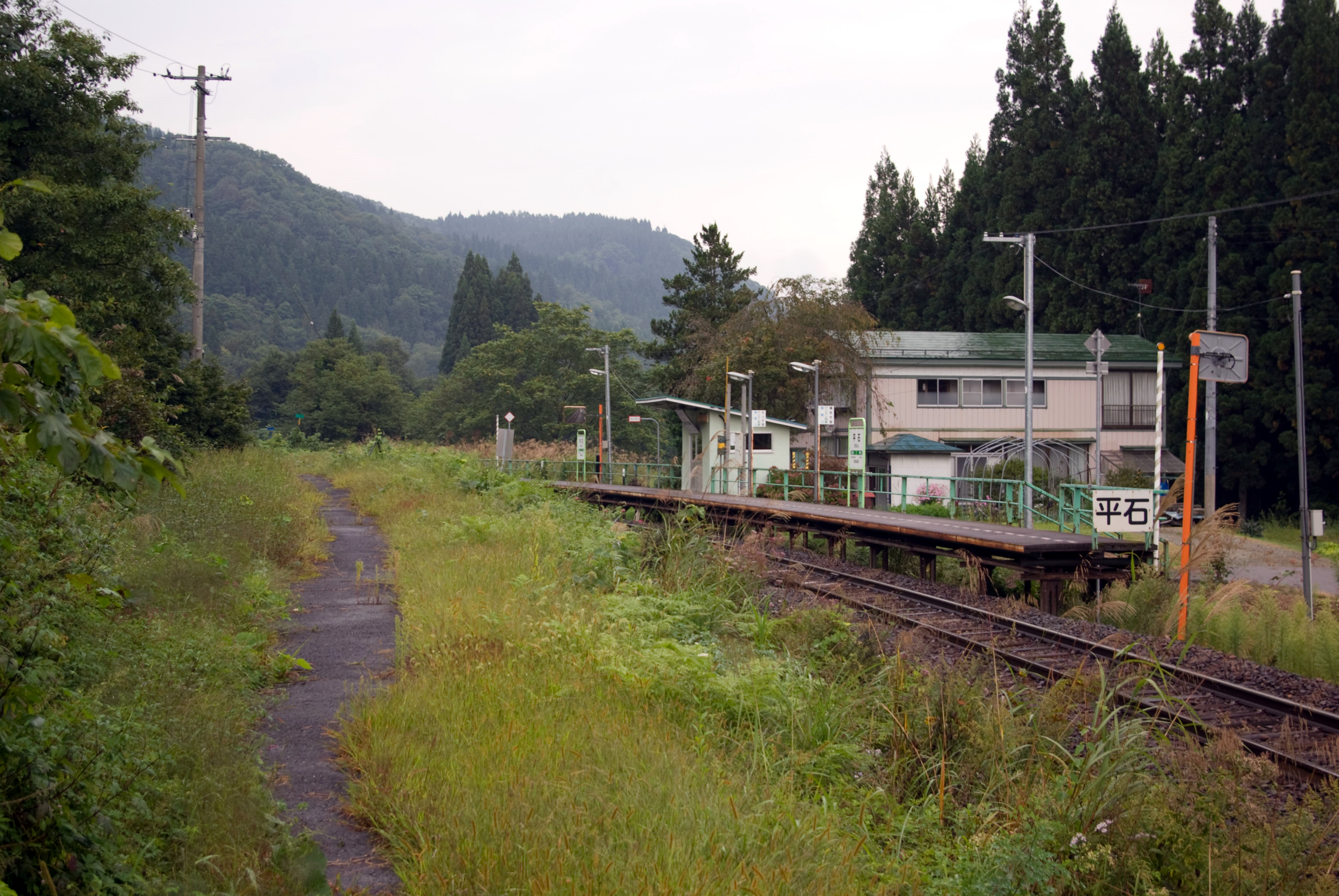
- Hiraishi Station, September 2009

General information
- Location: Hiraishijodan Sannaitsuchibuchi, Yokote-shi, Akita-ken; Japan
- Coordinates: 39°17′30.1″N 140°37′42.5″E
- Operator: JR East
- Line: ■ Kitakami Line
- Distance: 51.6 kilometers from Kitakami
- Platforms: 1 side platform

Other information
- Status: Unstaffed
- Website: Official website

History
- Opened: July 15, 1963
- Closed: March 12, 2022

Former services
Preceding station	JR East	Following station
Ainono towards Yokote	Kitakami Line Local (Mar - Dec)	Komatsukawa towards Kitakami
Location
- Location within Akita Prefecture Location within Japan

Hiraishi Station (平石駅, Hiraishi-eki) was a railway station in the city of Yokote, Akita Prefecture, Japan, operated by JR East. The station closed on 12 March 2022.

== Lines ==
Hiraishi Station was served by local trains of the Kitakami Line, and was located 51.6 kilometres (32.1 mi) from the terminus of the line at Kitakami Station.

The station was closed during the winter months.

== Station layout ==
The station consisted of a single side platform serving bi-directional traffic. The station was unattended.

== History ==
Hiraishi Station opened on July 15, 1963, as a station on the Japan National Railways (JNR). The station was absorbed into the JR East network upon the privatization of the JNR on April 1, 1987.

Starting on December 1, 2016, the station was closed seasonally during the winter months (December - March).

Hiraishi Station closed on March 12, 2022.

== Surrounding area ==
- National Route 107

== See also ==
- List of railway stations in Japan
