= Iwasawa Station =

Railway station in Kitakami, Iwate Prefecture, Japan

Iwasawa Station 岩沢駅
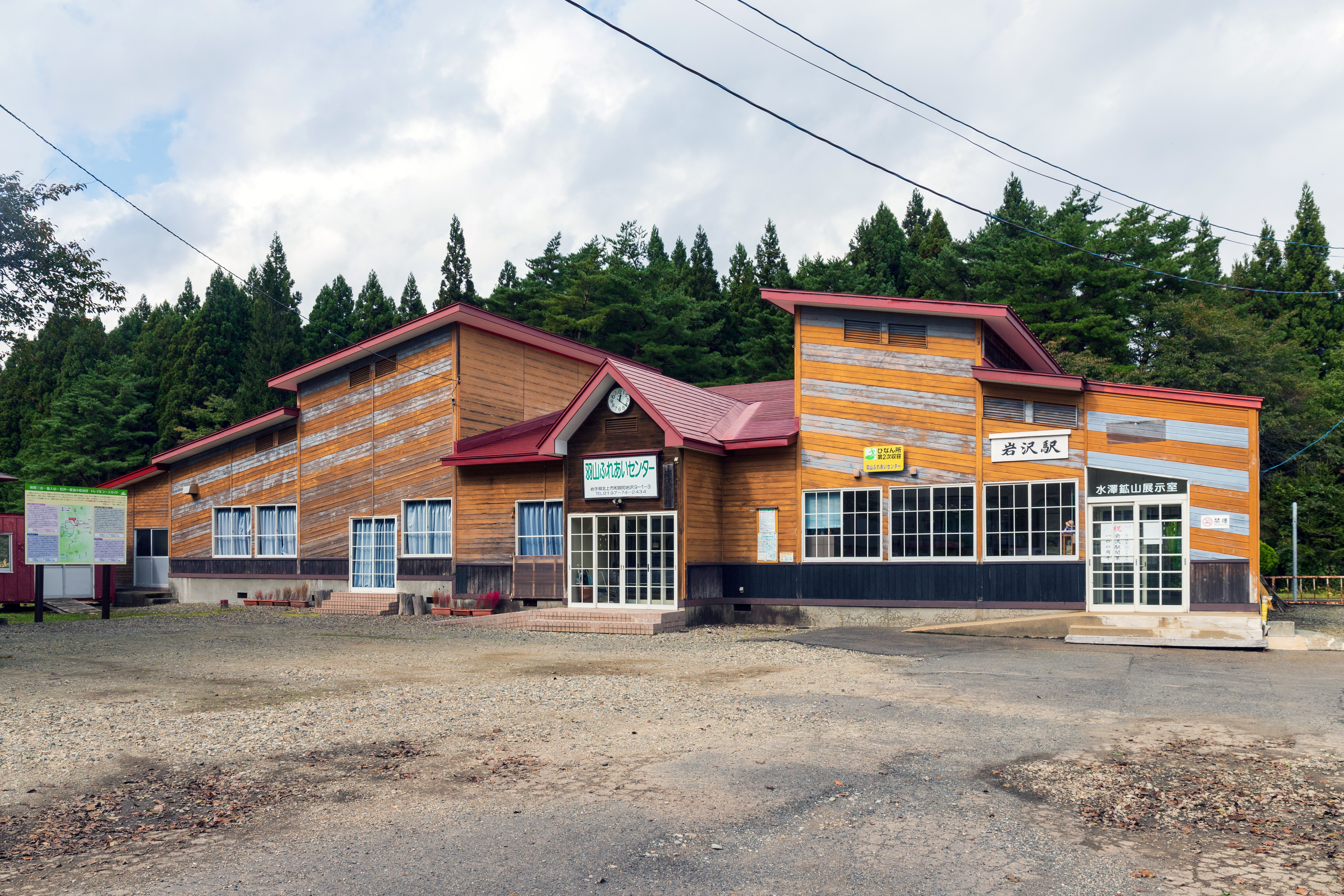
- Iwasawa Station

General information
- Location: Waga-cho, Iwasawa 9 Jiwari 1-3, Kitakami-shi, Iwate-ken 024-0325; Japan
- Coordinates: 39.3009°N 140.9318°E
- Operator: JR East
- Line: ■ Kitakami Line
- Distance: 18.1 km from Kitakami
- Platforms: 1 side platform
- Tracks: 1

Construction
- Structure type: At grade

Other information
- Status: Unstaffed
- Website: Official website

History
- Opened: November 18, 1921

Services
Preceding station	JR East	Following station
Wakasennin towards Yokote	Kitakami Line Rapid; Local	Yokokawame towards Kitakami
Location
- Location within Iwate Prefecture Location within Japan

Iwasawa Station (岩沢駅, Iwasawa-eki) is a railway station located in the city of Kitakami, Iwate Prefecture, Japan, operated by the East Japan Railway Company (JR East).

== Lines ==
Iwasawa Station is served by the Kitakami Line, and is located 18.1 km from the terminus of the line at Kitakami Station.

== Station layout ==
The station has one side platform serving a single bi-directional track. The station is unattended.

== History ==
Iwasawa Station opened on November 18, 1921. The station was absorbed into the JR East network upon the privatization of the Japan National Railways (JNR) on April 1, 1987. A new station building was completed in 1991.

== Surrounding area ==
- National Route 107

== See also ==
- List of railway stations in Japan
