= Komatsukawa Station =

Railway station in Yokote, Akita Prefecture, Japan

Komatsukawa Station 小松川駅
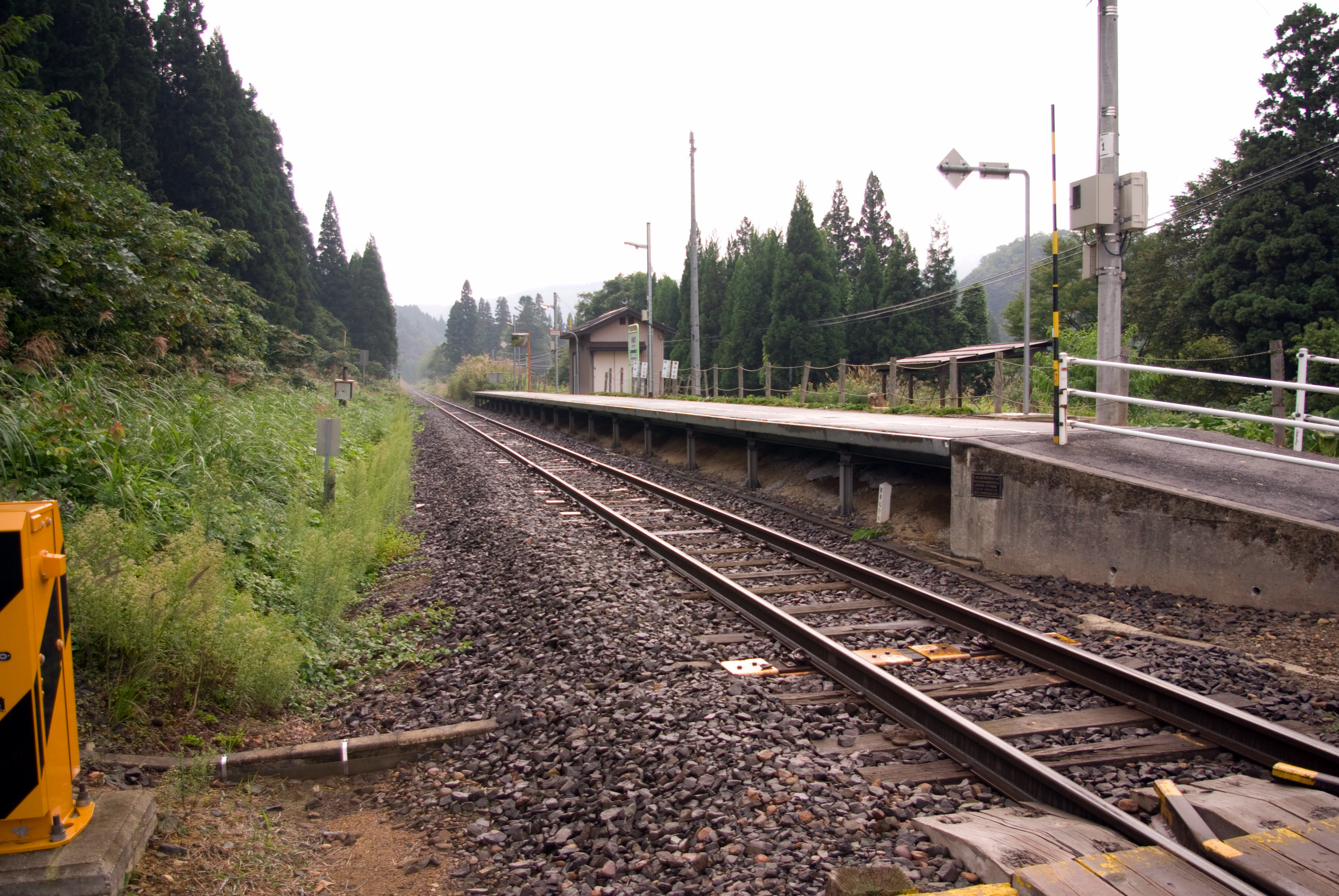
- Komatsukawa Station, September 2009

General information
- Location: Nakatayachi Sannaikomatsukawa, Yokote-shi, Akita-ken 019-1102; Japan
- Coordinates: 39°17′36.2″N 140°38′46.2″E
- Operator: JR East
- Line: ■ Kitakami Line
- Distance: 49.6 kilometers from Kitakami
- Platforms: 1 side platform

Other information
- Status: Unstaffed
- Website: Official website

History
- Opened: December 25, 1951

Services
Preceding station	JR East	Following station
Ainono towards Yokote	Kitakami Line Local	Kurosawa towards Kitakami
Former services
Preceding station	JR East	Following station
Hiraishi towards Yokote	Kitakami Line Local (Mar - Dec)	Kurosawa towards Kitakami
Location
- Location within Akita Prefecture Location within Japan

Komatsukawa Station (小松川駅, Komatsukawa-eki) is a railway station in the city of Yokote, Akita Prefecture, Japan, operated by JR East.

== Lines ==
Komatsukawa Station is served by the Kitakami Line, and is located 49.6 kilometres (30.8 mi) from the terminus of the line at Kitakami Station.

== Station layout ==
The station consists of a single side platform serving bi-directional traffic. A waiting room is located at the center of the platform. The station is unattended.

== History ==
Komatsukawa Station opened on December 25, 1951 as a station on the Japan National Railways (JNR). The station was absorbed into the JR East network upon the privatization of the JNR on April 1, 1987.

== Surrounding area ==
- National Route 107

== See also ==
- List of railway stations in Japan
