= Tatekawame Station =

Railway station in Kitakami, Iwate Prefecture, Japan

Tatekawame Station 立川目駅
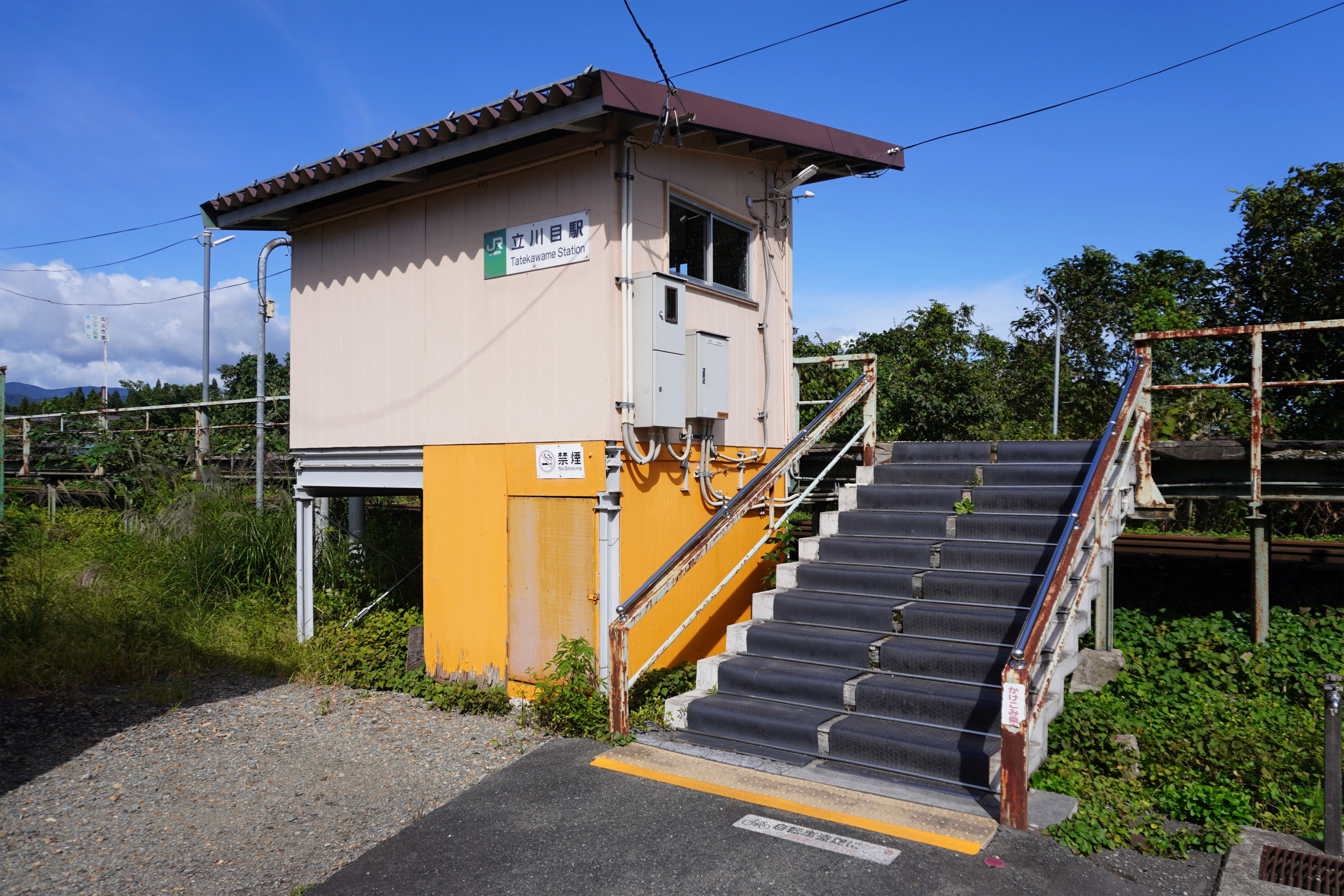
- Tatekawame Station in October 2023

General information
- Location: Waga-cho, Tatekawame 2 Jiwari 80, Kitakami-shi, Iwate-ken 24-0332; Japan
- Coordinates: 39.3080°N 140.9970°E
- Operator: JR East
- Line: ■ Kitakami Line
- Distance: 12.1 km from Kitakami
- Platforms: 1 side platform
- Tracks: 1

Construction
- Structure type: At grade

Other information
- Status: Unstaffed
- Website: Official website

History
- Opened: May 15, 1963

Services
Preceding station	JR East	Following station
Yokokawame towards Yokote	Kitakami Line Rapid; Local	Fujine towards Kitakami
Location
- Location within Iwate Prefecture Location within Japan

Tatekawame Station (立川目駅, Tatekawame-eki) is a railway station located in the city of Kitakami, Iwate Prefecture, Japan, operated by the East Japan Railway Company (JR East).

== Lines ==
Tatekawame Station is served by the Kitakami Line, and is located 12.1 km from the terminus of the line at Kitakami Station.

== Station layout ==
The station has ine side platform serving traffic in both directions. The station is unattended.

== History ==
Tatekawame Station opened on May 15, 1963. The station was absorbed into the JR East network upon the privatization of the Japan National Railways (JNR) on April 1, 1987.

== Surrounding area ==
- National Route 107

== See also ==
- List of railway stations in Japan
