= Yudakōgen Station =

Railway station in Nishiwaga, Iwate Prefecture, Japan

Yudakōgen Station ゆだ高原駅
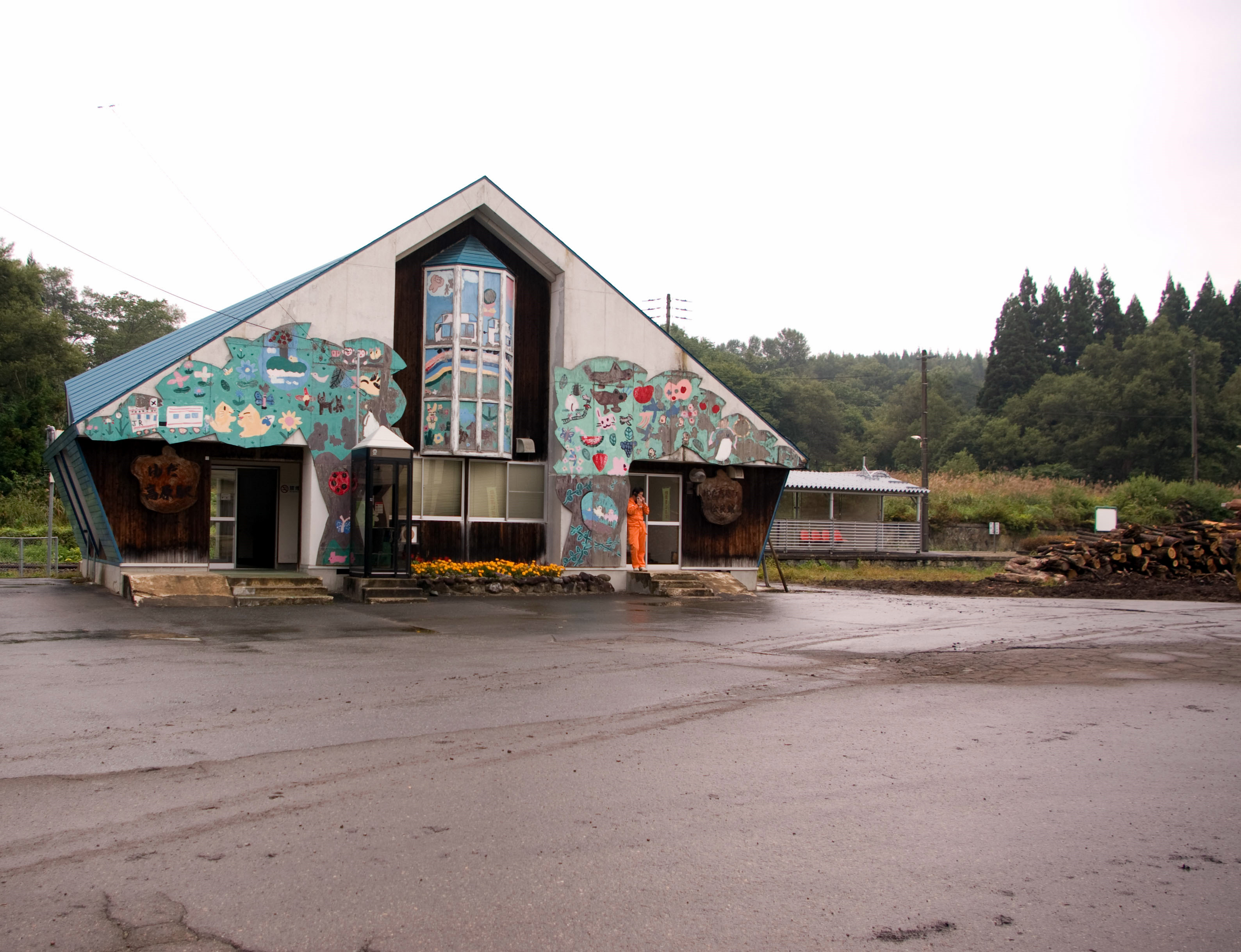
- Yudakōgen Station in February 2010

General information
- Location: Shirakino 67 Jiwari, Nishiwaga-machi, Iwate-ken 029-5523; Japan
- Coordinates: 39°18′3.7″N 140°44′13.6″E
- Operator: JR East
- Line: ■ Kitakami Line
- Distance: 39.1 km from Kitakami
- Platforms: 1 side platform
- Tracks: 1

Construction
- Structure type: At grade

Other information
- Status: Unstaffed
- Website: Official website

History
- Opened: December 25, 1948
- Former names: Iwate-Yuda (until 1991)

Services
| Preceding station | JR East | Following station |
|---|---|---|
| Kurosawa towards Yokote | Kitakami Line Rapid; Local | Hotto-Yuda towards Kitakami |
Location
- Location within Iwate Prefecture Location within Japan

Yudakōgen Station (ゆだ高原駅, Yudakōgen-eki) is a railway station located in the town of Nishiwaga, Iwate Prefecture, Japan, operated by the East Japan Railway Company (JR East).

== Lines ==
Yudakōgen Station is served by the Kitakami Line, and is located 39.1 km from the terminus of the line at Kitakami Station.

== Station layout ==
The station has one side platform serving a single bi-directional track. The station is unattended.

== History ==
Yudakōgen Station opened on December 25, 1948, as Iwate-Yuda Station (岩手湯田駅), serving the village of Yuda, Iwate. The station was absorbed into the JR East network upon the privatization of the Japan National Railways (JNR) on April 1, 1987. The station was renamed to its present name on June 20, 1991.

== Surrounding area ==
- National Route 107
- Akita Expressway – Yuda IC

== See also ==
- List of railway stations in Japan
