= Yabitsu Station =

Railway station in Yokote, Akita Prefecture, Japan

Yabitsu Station 矢美津駅
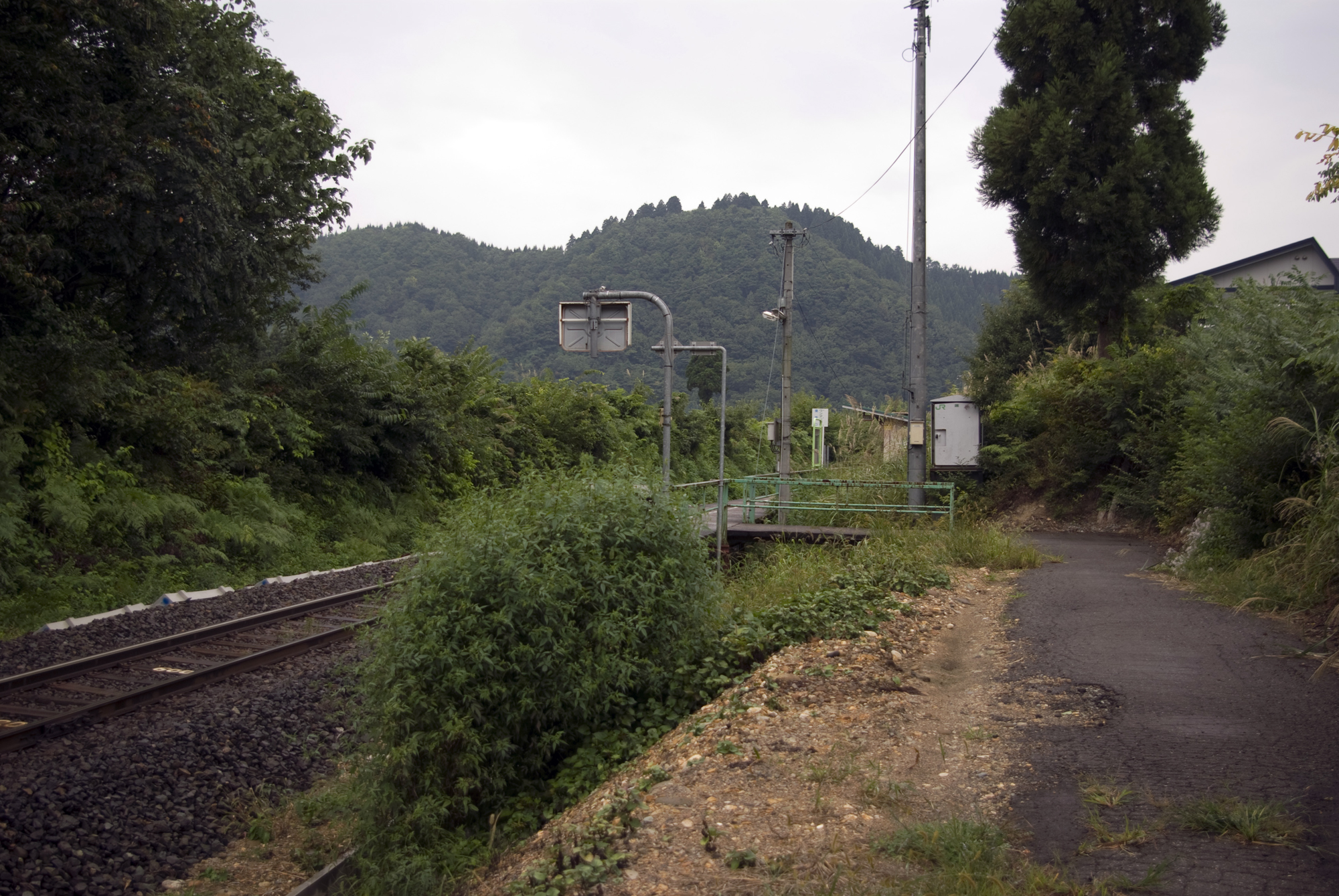
- Yabitsu Station, September 2009

General information
- Location: Yabitsu Sannaiosawa, Yokote-shi, Akita-ken 019-1109; Japan
- Coordinates: 39°17′27.5″N 140°35′32.1″E
- Operator: JR East
- Line: ■ Kitakami Line
- Distance: 56.6 kilometers from Kitakami
- Platforms: 1 side platform

Other information
- Status: Unstaffed
- Website: Official website

History
- Opened: 15 July 1963
- Closed: 12 March 2022

Former services
Preceding station	JR East	Following station
Yokote Terminus	Kitakami Line Local (Mar - Dec)	Ainono towards Kitakami
Location
- Location within Akita Prefecture Location within Japan

Yabitsu Station (矢美津駅, Yabitsu-eki) was a railway station in the city of Yokote, Akita Prefecture, Japan, operated by JR East. The station closed permanently on March 12, 2022.

== Lines ==
Yabitsu Station was served by the Kitakami Line, and was located 56.6 kilometres (35.2 mi) from the terminus of the line at Kitakami Station.

During the winter months (December - March), the station was closed.

== Station layout ==
The station consisted of a single side platform serving bi-directional traffic. There was a waiting room at the center of the platform. The station was unattended.

== History ==
Yabitsu Station opened on July 15, 1963, as a station on the Japan National Railways (JNR). The station was absorbed into the JR East network upon the privatization of the JNR on April 1, 1987.

In December 2016, it was announced that the station would be closed during the winter months (January - March).

The station closed permanently on March 12, 2022.

== Surrounding area ==
- National Route 107

== See also ==
- List of railway stations in Japan
