= Kurosawa Station (Yokote) =

Railway station in Yokote, Akita Prefecture, Japan

Kurosawa Station 黒沢駅
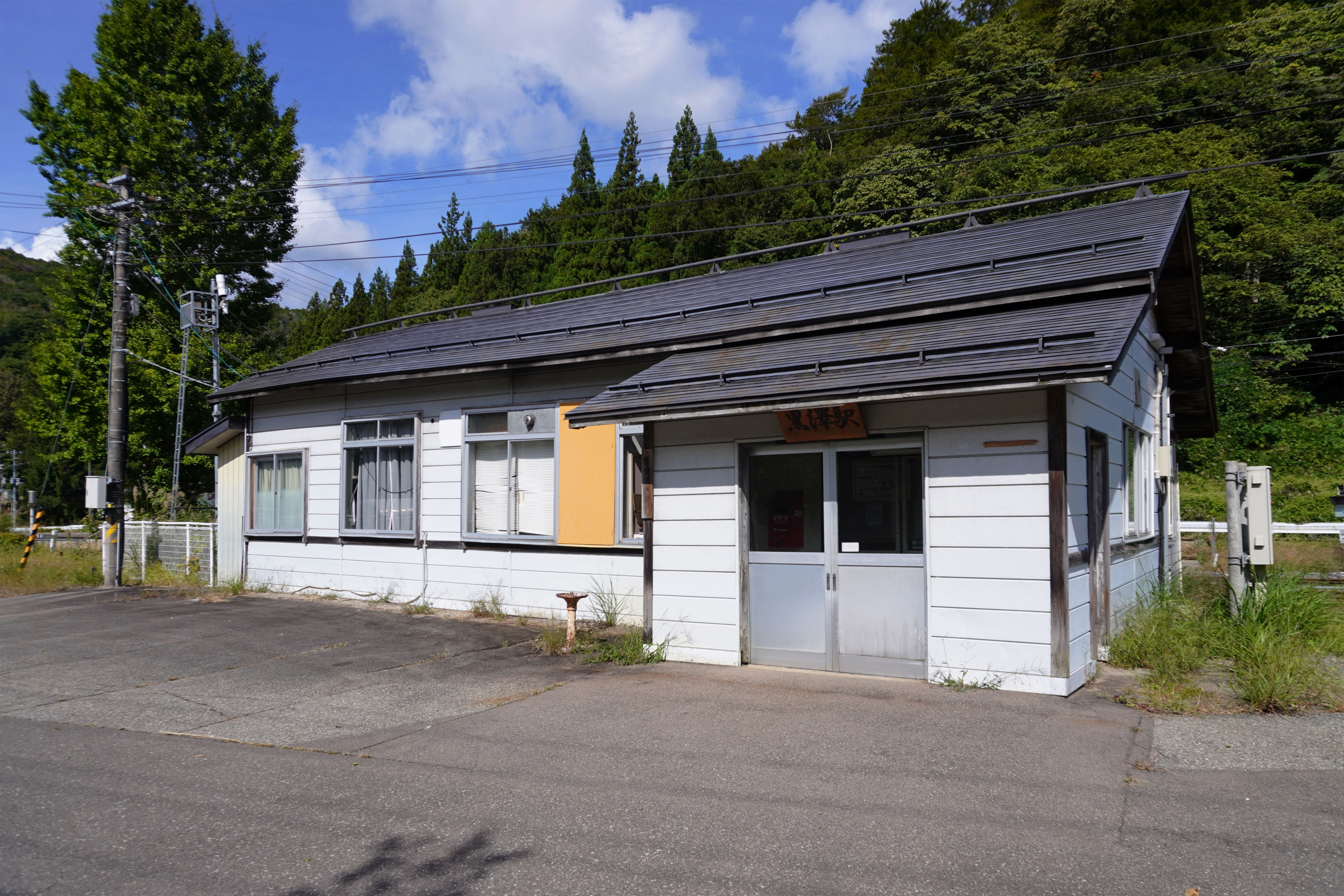
- Kurosawa Station, October 2023

General information
- Location: Gamazaka-57 Sannaikurosawa, Yokote-shi, Akita-ken 019-1103; Japan
- Coordinates: 39°16′34.3″N 140°41′58.7″E
- Operator: JR East
- Line: ■ Kitakami Line
- Distance: 44.3 kilometers from Kitakami
- Platforms: 1 island platform

Other information
- Status: Unstaffed
- Website: Official website

History
- Opened: November 27, 1921

Services
Preceding station	JR East	Following station
Ainono towards Yokote	Kitakami Line Rapid	Yudakōgen towards Kitakami
Komatsukawa towards Yokote	Kitakami Line Local	Yudakōgen towards Kitakami
Location
- Location within Akita Prefecture Location within Japan

Kurosawa Station (黒沢駅, Kurosawa-eki) is a railway station in the city of Yokote, Akita Prefecture, Japan, operated by JR East.

== Lines ==
Kurosawa Station is served by the Kitakami Line, and is located 44.3 kilometres (27.5 mi) from the terminus of the line at Kitakami Station.

== Station layout ==
The station consists of one island platform connected to the station building by a level crossing. The station is unattended.

=== Platforms ===
1	■ Kitakami Line	for Yokote
2	■ Kitakami Line	for Kitakami

== History ==
Kurosawa Station opened on November 27, 1921 as a station on the Japanese Government Railways (JGR), serving the village of Sannai, Akita. The JGR became the Japan National Railways (JNR) after World War II. The station was absorbed into the JR East network upon the privatization of the JNR on April 1, 1987.

== Surrounding area ==
- National Route 107

== See also ==
- List of railway stations in Japan
