= Yudakinshūko Station =

Railway station in Nishiwaga, Iwate Prefecture, Japan

Yudakinshūko Station ゆだ錦秋湖駅
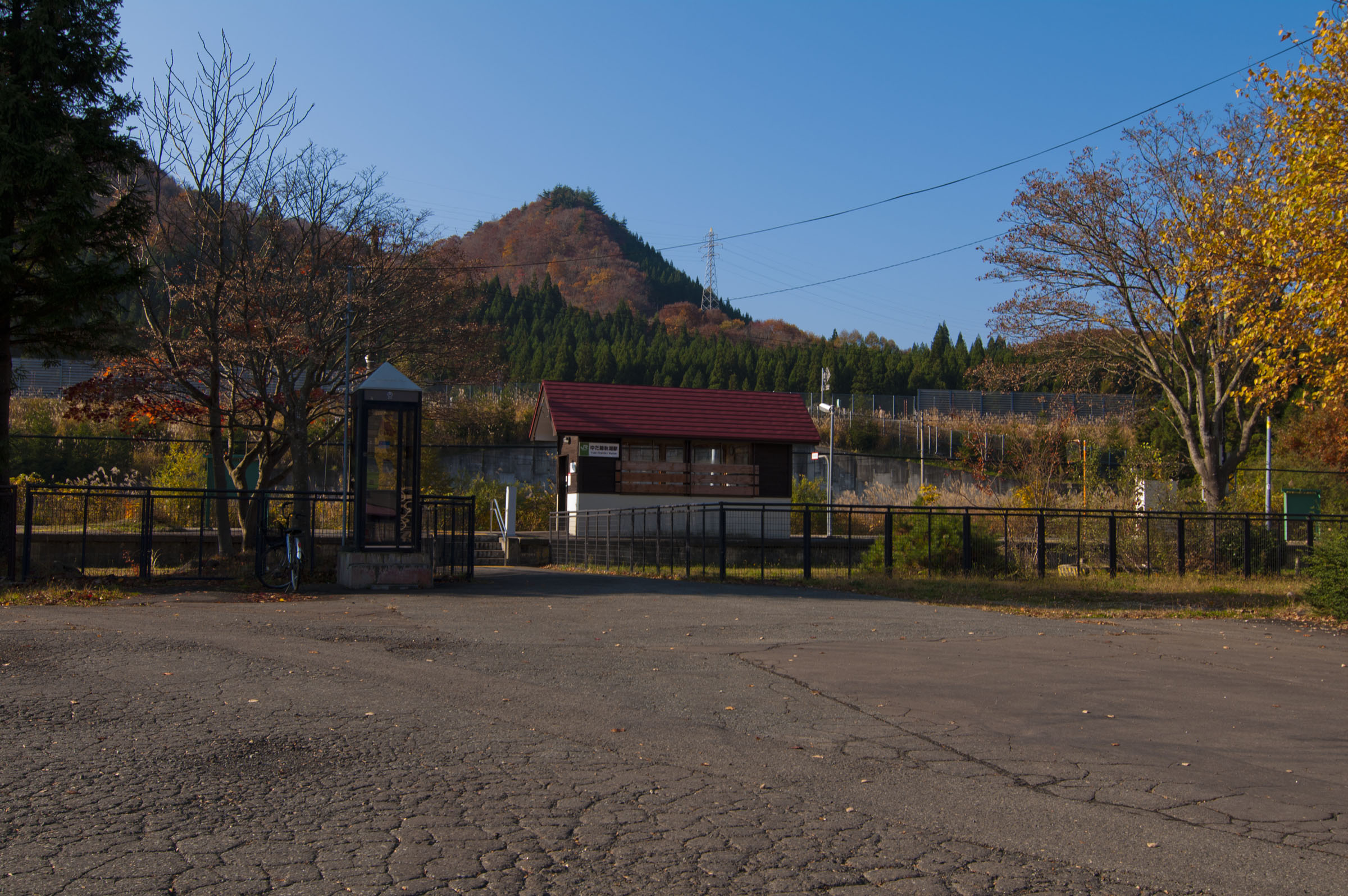
- Yudakinshūko Station

General information
- Location: Mimidori 49 Jiwari 2, Nishiwaga-machi, Waga-gun, Iwate-ken 029-5513; Japan
- Coordinates: 39.2953°N 140.8353°E
- Operator: JR East
- Line: ■ Kitakami Line
- Distance: 28.8 km from Kitakami
- Platforms: 1 side platform
- Tracks: 1

Construction
- Structure type: At grade

Other information
- Status: Unstaffed
- Website: Official website

History
- Opened: November 15, 1924
- Former names: Rikuchū-Ōishi Station (until 1991)

Services
Preceding station	JR East	Following station
Hotto-Yuda towards Yokote	Kitakami Line Rapid; Local	Wakasennin towards Kitakami
Location
- Location within Iwate Prefecture Location within Japan

Yudakinshūko Station (ゆだ錦秋湖駅, Yudakinshūko-eki) is a railway station located in the town of Nishiwaga, Iwate Prefecture, Japan, operated by the East Japan Railway Company (JR East).

== Lines ==
Yudakinshūko Station is served by the Kitakami Line, and is located 28.8 km from the terminus of the line at Kitakami Station.

== Station layout ==
The station has one side platform serving a single bi-directional track. The station is unattended.

== History ==
Yudakinshūko Station opened on November 15, 1924, as Rikuchū-Ōishi Station (陸中大石駅), on the now-defunct Yokoguro Line. With the construction of Yuda Dam in late 1962, the line was re-routed to become part of the Kitakami Line. The station was absorbed into the JR East network upon the privatization of the Japan National Railways (JNR) on April 1, 1987. The station was renamed to its present name on June 20, 1991.

== Surrounding area ==
- National Route 107

== See also ==
- List of railway stations in Japan
