= Ezuriko Station =

Railway station in Kitakami, Iwate Prefecture, Japan

Ezuriko Station 江釣子駅
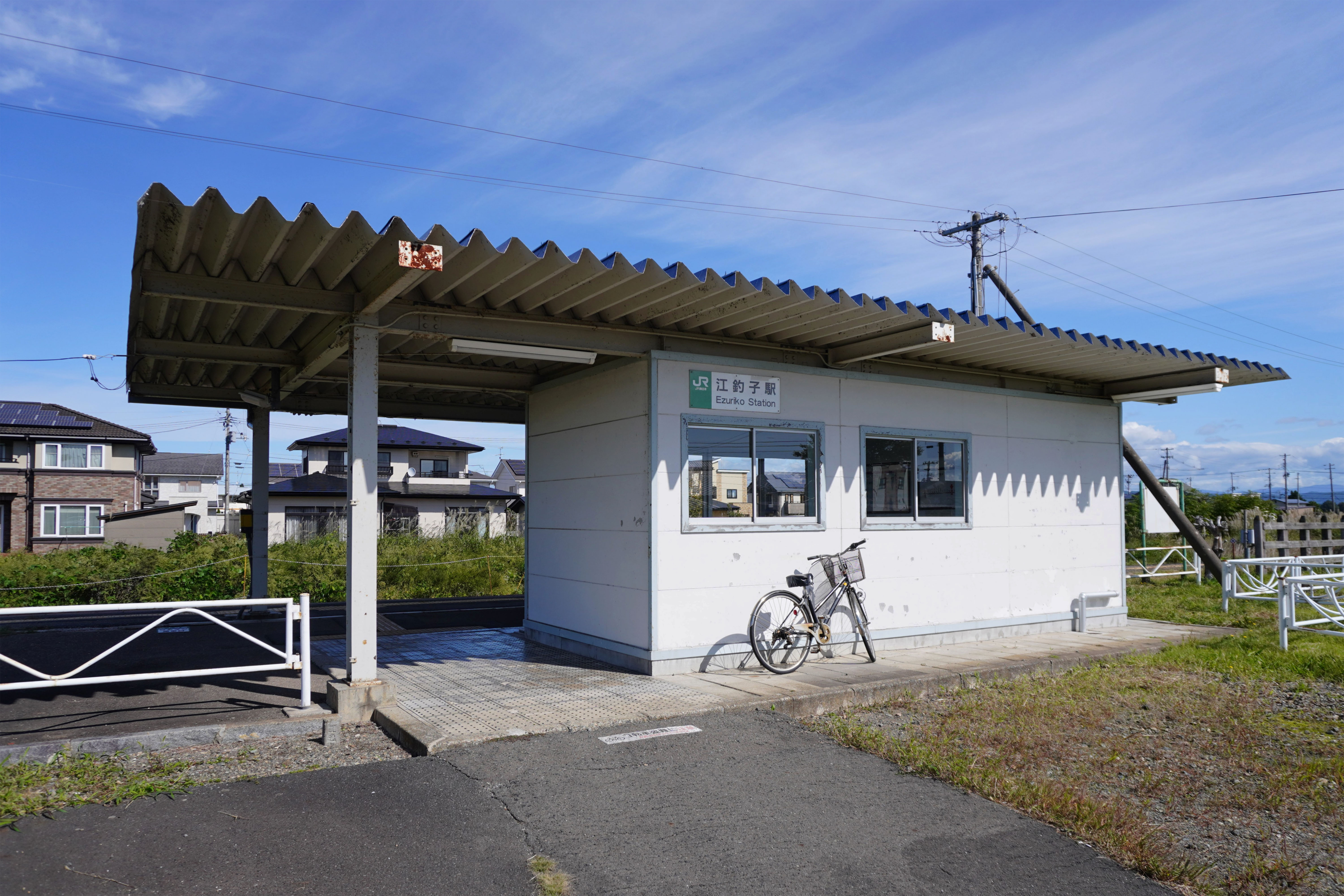
- Ezuriko Station in October 2023

General information
- Location: Ezuriko 17 Jiwari 36-2, Kitakami-shi, Iwate-ken 024-0071; Japan
- Coordinates: 39.2982°N 141.0760°E
- Operator: JR East
- Line: ■ Kitakami Line
- Distance: 5.2 km from Kitakami
- Platforms: 1 side platform
- Tracks: 1

Construction
- Structure type: At grade

Other information
- Status: Unstaffed
- Website: Official website

History
- Opened: April 15, 1923

Services
Preceding station	JR East	Following station
Fujine towards Yokote	Kitakami Line Rapid; Local	Yanagihara towards Kitakami
Location
- Location within Iwate Prefecture Location within Japan

Ezuriko Station (江釣子駅, Ezuriko-eki) is a railway station located in the city of Kitakami, Iwate Prefecture, Japan, operated by the East Japan Railway Company (JR East)

== Lines ==
Ezuriko Station is served by the Kitakami Line, and is located 5.2 km from the terminus of the line at Kitakami Station.

== Station layout ==
The station has one side platform serving a single bi-directional track. The station is unattended.

== History ==
Ezuriko Station opened on April 15, 1923. The station was absorbed into the JR East network upon the privatization of the Japan National Railways (JNR) on April 1, 1987.

== Surrounding area ==
- National Route 107
- Tohoku Expressway
- Ezuriko Post Office

== See also ==
- List of railway stations in Japan
