= Yokokawame Station =

Railway station in Kitakami, Iwate Prefecture, Japan

Yokokawame Station 横川目駅
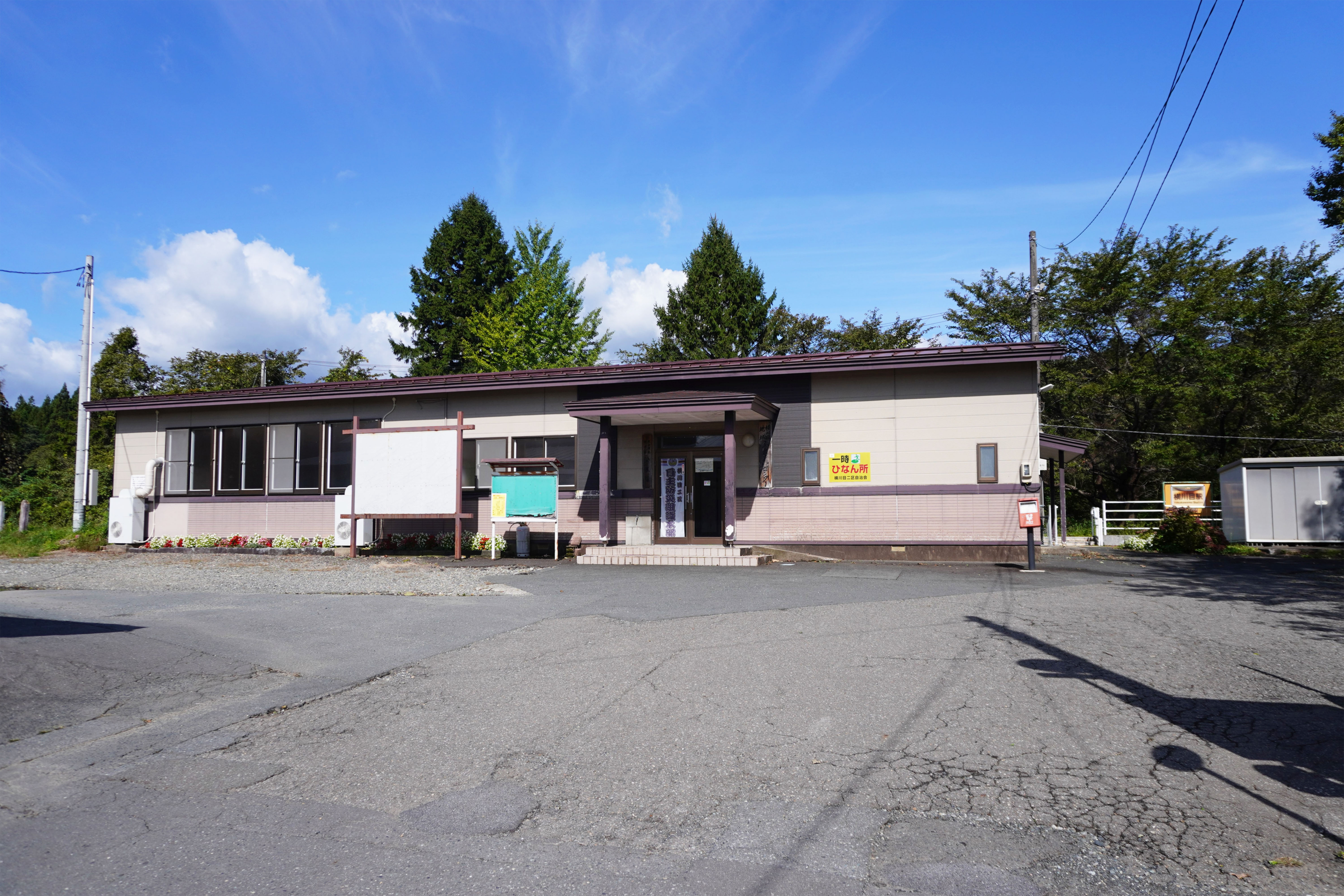
- Fureai Center & Yokokawame Station

General information
- Location: Waga-cho, Yokokawame 12 Jiwari 12-2, Kitakami-shi, Iwate-ken 024-0331; Japan
- Coordinates: 39.3091°N 140.9723°E
- Operator: JR East
- Line: ■ Kitakami Line
- Distance: 18.1 km from Kitakami
- Platforms: 1 side platform
- Tracks: 1

Construction
- Structure type: At grade

Other information
- Status: Unstaffed
- Website: Official website

History
- Opened: November 18, 1921

Services
Preceding station	JR East	Following station
Iwasawa towards Yokote	Kitakami Line Rapid; Local	Tatekawame towards Kitakami
Location
- Location within Iwate Prefecture Location within Japan

Yokokawame Station (横川目駅, Yokokawame-eki) is a railway station located in the city of Kitakami, Iwate Prefecture, Japan, operated by the East Japan Railway Company (JR East),

== Lines ==
Yokokawame Station is served by the Kitakami Line, and is located 18.1 km from the terminus of the line at Kitakami Station.

== Station layout ==
The station has one side platform serving a single bi-directional track. The station is unattended.

== History ==
Yokokawame Station opened on November 18, 1921. The station was absorbed into the JR East network upon the privatization of the Japan National Railways (JNR) on April 1, 1987. A new station building was completed in 1991.

== Surrounding area ==
- National Route 107
- Yokokawame Post Office
- former Waga Town Hall

== See also ==
- List of railway stations in Japan
