= Kitakami =

Kitakami may refer to:

- Kitakami, Iwate, a city in Iwate Prefecture, Japan
- Kitakami Station, a JR train station in Kitakami
- Kitakami Line, a JR railway line in Iwate Prefecture, Japan
- Kitakami Stadium, an athletic stadium in Kitakami
- Kitakami River, a river that flows through Iwate and Miyagi Prefectures in Japan
- Kitakami Mountains
- Japanese cruiser Kitakami, a former cruiser in the Imperial Japanese Navy
- Kitakami, the fictional area where The Teal Mask, the first part of Pokémon Scarlet and Violet: The Hidden Treasure of Area Zero, takes place
