= Ainono Station =

Railway station in Yokote, Akita Prefecture, Japan

Ainono Station 相野々駅
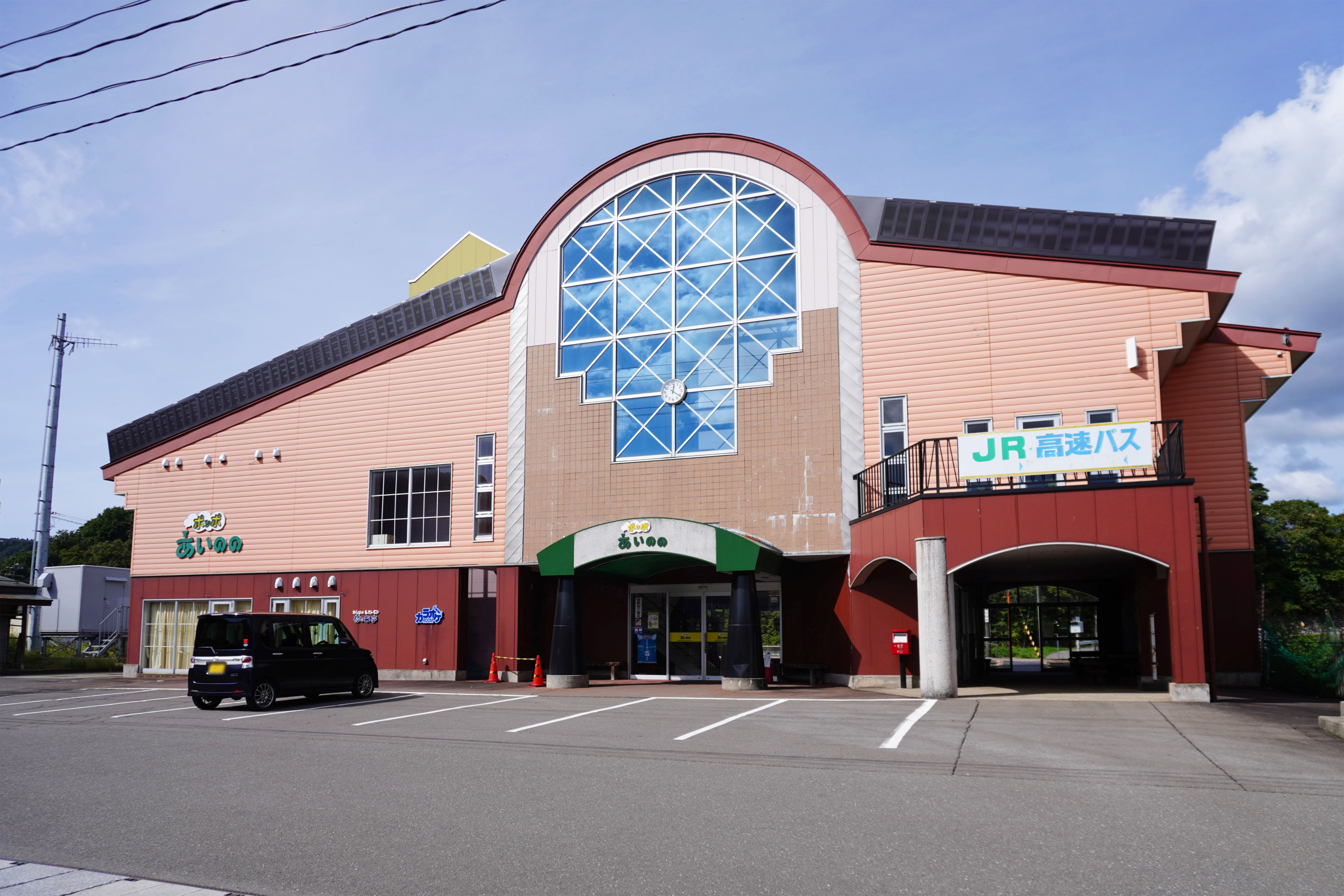
- Ainono Station, October 2023

General information
- Location: Nakajima-28-2 Sannaitsuchibuchi, Yokote-shi, Akita-ken 019-1108; Japan
- Coordinates: 39°16′41.3″N 140°37′7.9″E
- Operator: JR East
- Line: ■ Kitakami Line
- Distance: 53.4 kilometers from Kitakami
- Platforms: 1 island platform

Other information
- Status: Unstaffed
- Website: Official website

History
- Opened: 10 October 1920

Passengers
- FY2018: 10 daily

Services
Preceding station	JR East	Following station
Yokote Terminus	Kitakami Line Rapid	Kurosawa towards Kitakami
Yokote Terminus	Kitakami Line Local	Komatsukawa towards Kitakami
Former services
Preceding station	JR East	Following station
Yabitsu towards Yokote	Kitakami Line Local (Mar - Dec)	Hiraishi towards Kitakami
Location
- Location within Akita Prefecture Location within Japan

Ainono Station (相野々駅, Ainono-eki) is a railway station in the city of Yokote, Akita Prefecture, Japan, operated by JR East.

== Lines ==
Ainono Station is served by the Kitakami Line, and is located 53.4 kilometres (33.2 mi) from the terminus of the line at Kitakami Station.

== Station layout ==
The station consists of an island platform serving two tracks. A level crossing connects the platform to the station building located south of the platforms. A waiting room is also located at the centre of the platform. The station is unattended.

=== Platforms ===
1	■ Kitakami Line	for Yokote
2	■ Kitakami Line	for Kitakami

== History ==
Ainono Station opened on October 10, 1920, as a station on the Japanese Government Railways (JGR), serving the village of Sannai, Akita. The JGR became the Japan National Railways (JNR) after World War II. The station was absorbed into the JR East network upon the privatization of the JNR on April 1, 1987. A new station building was completed in July 1996.

== Surrounding area ==
- National Route 107

== See also ==
- List of railway stations in Japan
