= Fujine Station (Iwate) =

Railway station in Kitakami, Iwate Prefecture, Japan

Fujine Station 藤根駅
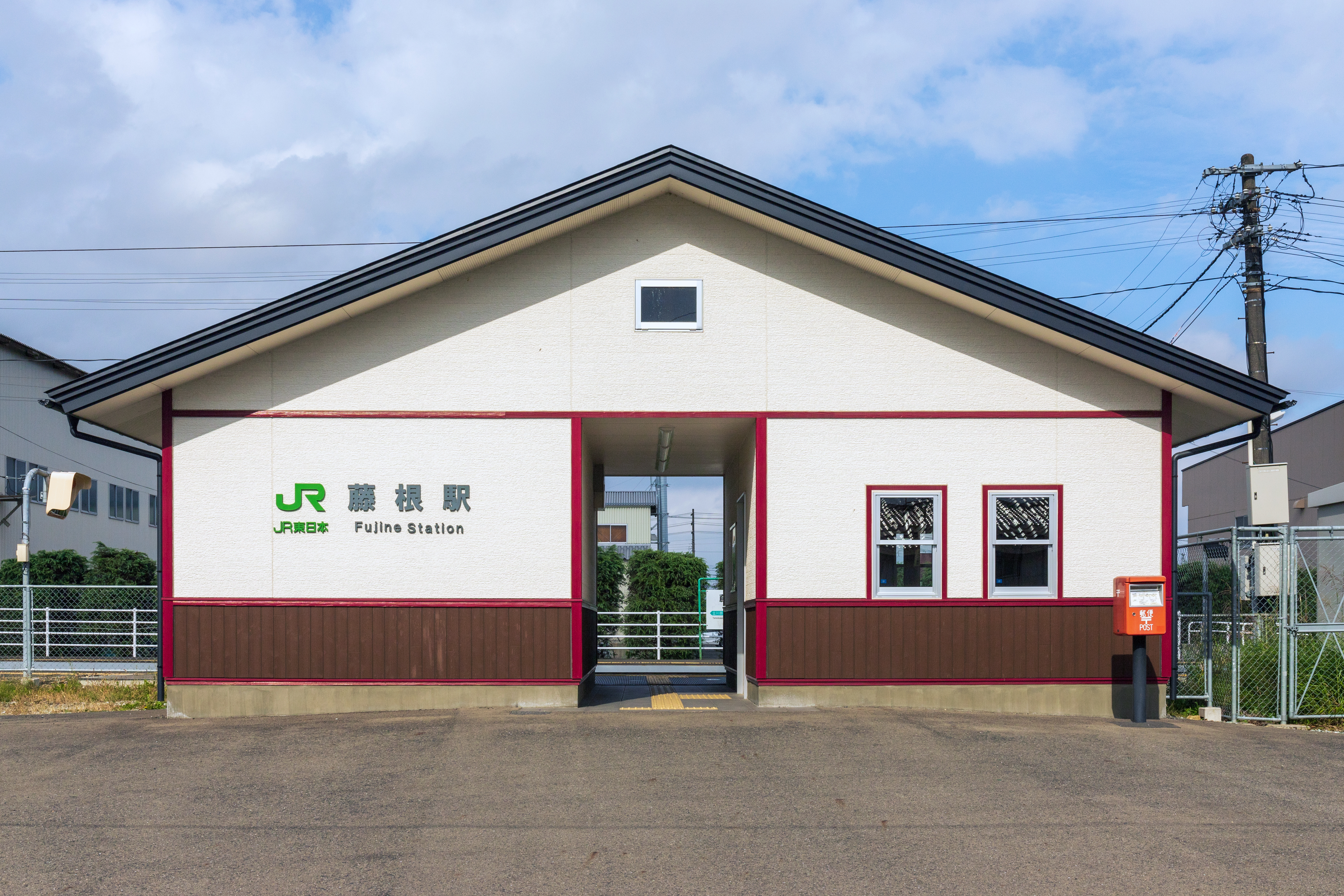
- Fujine Station in October 2022

General information
- Location: Waga-cho, Fujine Jiwari 9, Kitakami-shi, Iwate-ken 024-0334; Japan
- Coordinates: 39.3009°N 141.0400°E
- Operator: JR East
- Line: ■ Kitakami Line
- Distance: 20.3 km from Kitakami
- Platforms: 2 side platforms
- Tracks: 2

Construction
- Structure type: At grade

Other information
- Status: Unstaffed
- Website: Official website

History
- Opened: March 21, 1921

Passengers
- FY2017: 158 (daily)

Services
Preceding station	JR East	Following station
Tatekawame towards Yokote	Kitakami Line Rapid; Local	Ezuriko towards Kitakami
Location
- Location within Iwate Prefecture Location within Japan

Fujine Station (藤根駅, Fujine-eki) is a railway station located in the city of Kitakami, Iwate Prefecture, Japan, operated by the East Japan Railway Company (JR East).

== Lines ==
Fujine Station is served by the Kitakami Line, and is located 8.4 km from the terminus of the line at Kitakami Station.

== Station layout ==
The station has two opposed side platforms connected to the station building by a level crossing. The station is unattended.

=== Platforms ===
1	■ Kitakami Line	for Hottoyuda and Yokote
2	■ Kitakami Line	for Kitakami

== History ==
Fujine Station opened on March 21, 1921. The station was absorbed into the JR East network upon the privatization of the Japan National Railways (JNR) on April 1, 1987.

== Passenger statistics ==
In fiscal 2017, the station was used by an average of 158 passenger daily (boarding passengers only).

== Surrounding area ==
- National Route 107
- Akita Expressway

== See also ==
- List of railway stations in Japan
