= Yanagihara =

Yanagihara (written: 柳原) is a Japanese surname. Notable people with the surname include:

- Hanya Yanagihara (born 1974), American writer
- Hiromi Yanagihara (柳原 尋美; 1979–1999), Japanese singer and idol
- Kanako Yanagihara (柳原 可奈子; born 1986), Japanese actress, comedian and television personality
- Yanagihara Naruko (柳原 愛子; 1859–1943), Japanese lady-in-waiting of the Imperial House of Japan
- Yanagihara Yuka, pianist, Osaka Jazz Channel

== See also ==
- Yanagihara Station (disambiguation), multiple railway stations in Japan
