= Hotto-Yuda Station =

Railway station in Nishiwaga, Iwate Prefecture, Japan

Hotto-Yuda Station ほっとゆだ駅
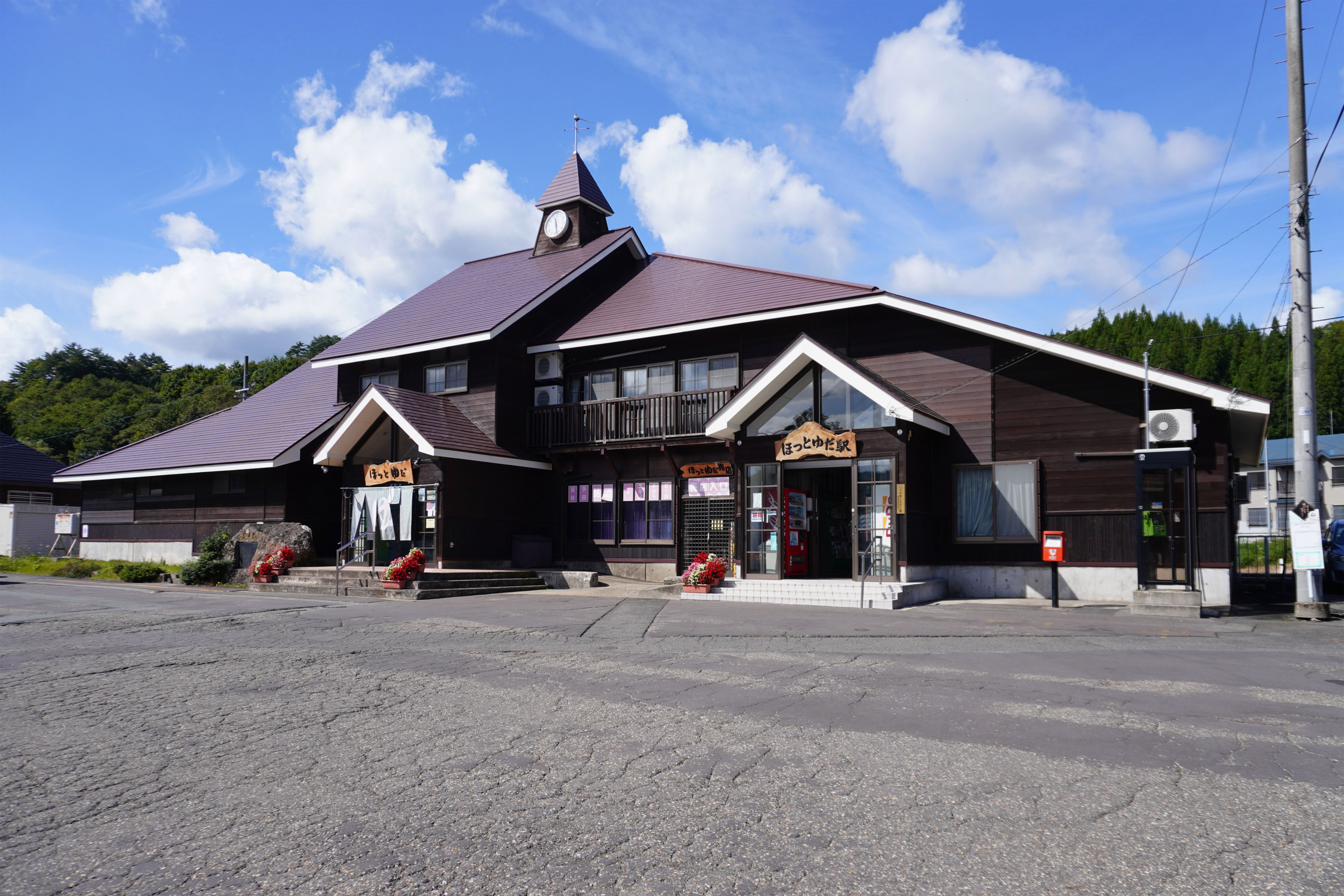
- Hotto-Yuda Station in October 2023

General information
- Location: Kawashiri 40 chiwari, Nishiwaga-machi, Waga-gun, Iwate-ken 029-5500; Japan
- Coordinates: 39.3145°N 140.7758°E
- Operator: JR East
- Line: ■ Kitakami Line
- Distance: 35.2 km from Kitakami
- Platforms: 1 side + 1 island platform
- Tracks: 3

Construction
- Structure type: At grade

Other information
- Status: Staffed (Midori no Madoguchi)
- Website: Official website

History
- Opened: December 16, 1922
- Former names: Rikuchū-Kawajiri Station (until 1991)

Passengers
- FY2018: 120 daily

Services
Preceding station	JR East	Following station
Yudakōgen towards Yokote	Kitakami Line Rapid; Local	Yudakinshūko towards Kitakami
Location
- Location within Iwate Prefecture Location within Japan

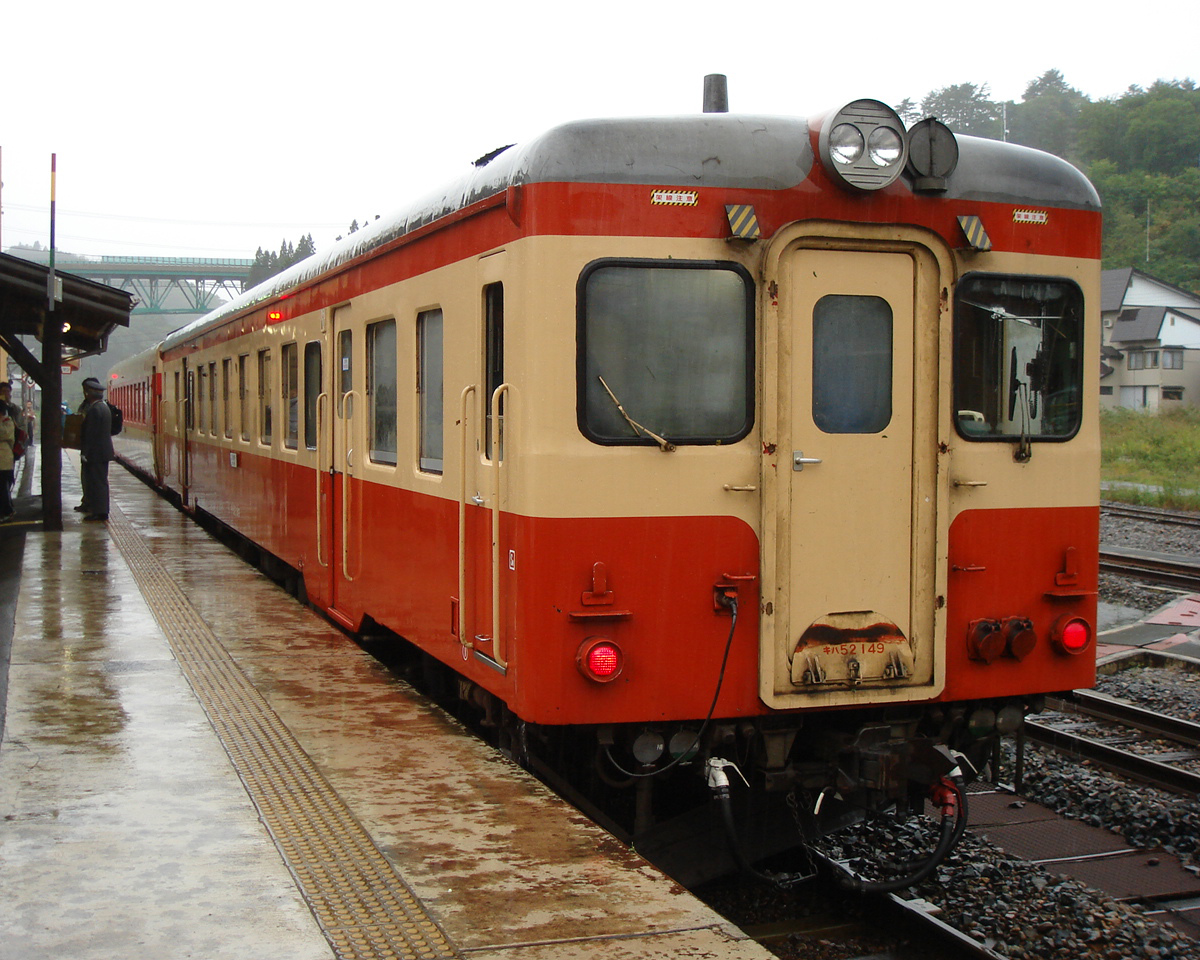
A Kiha 52 DMU at Hottoyuda Station in 2006

Hotto-Yuda Station (ほっとゆだ駅, Hottoyuda-eki) is a railway station in the town of Nishiwaga, Iwate Prefecture, Japan, operated by East Japan Railway Company (JR East).

== Lines ==
Hotto-Yuda Station is served by the Kitakami Line, and is located 35.2 km from the terminus of the line at Kitakami Station.

== Station layout ==
The station has a side platform and an island platform connected to the station building by a level crossing. The platforms serve three tracks, only two tracks are used during regular service (one track per platform). The station building is located southeast of the platforms. There is no direct station access from the north side, but an overpass connects the station building to the area north of the station. The station has a Midori no Madoguchi ticket office.

=== Platforms ===
1	■ Kitakami Line	for Yokote
2	■ Kitakami Line	for Fujine and Kitakami

== History ==
The station opened on December 16, 1922, as Rikuchū-Kawajiri Station (陸中川尻駅). It was absorbed into the JR East network upon the privatization of the Japanese National Railways (JNR) on April 1, 1987. A new station building was completed in April 1989, and rebuilt in January 1995. The station was renamed Hotto-Yuda Station on June 20, 1991.

== Passenger statistics ==
In fiscal 2018, the station was used by an average of 120 passengers daily (boarding passengers only).

== Surrounding area ==
- National Route 107
- Kawashiri Post Office
- Yuda Onsen
- Nanshoji Temple

== See also ==
- List of railway stations in Japan
