= Yanagihara Station (Iwate) =

Railway station in Kitakami, Iwate Prefecture, Japan

Yanagihara Station 柳原駅
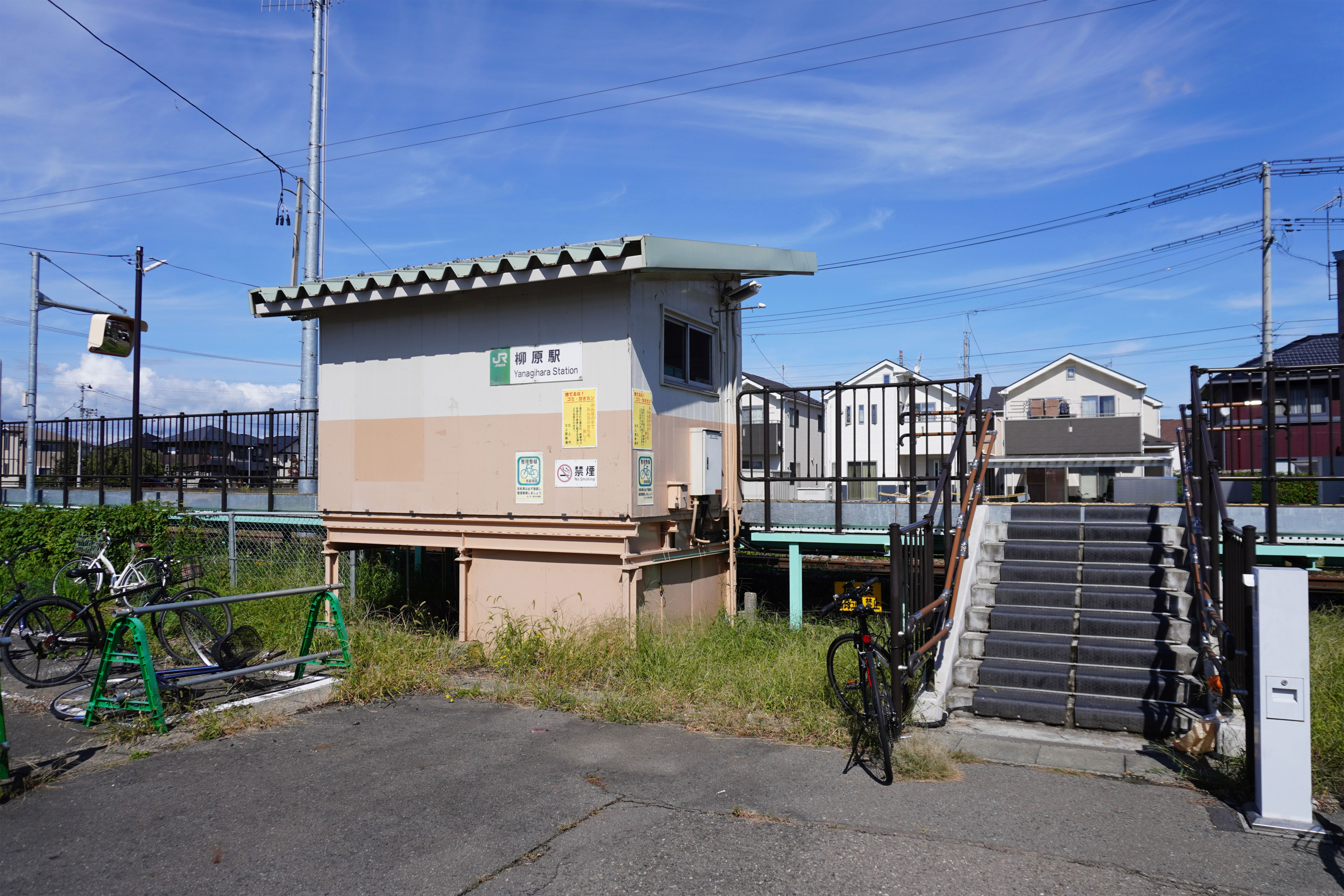
- Yanagihara Station in October 2023

General information
- Location: Yanagihara 1-chome 7-1, Kitakami-shi, Iwate-ken 024-0083; Japan
- Coordinates: 39.2946°N 141.1116°E
- Operator: JR East
- Line: ■ Kitakami Line
- Distance: 2.1 km from Kitakami
- Platforms: 1 side platform
- Tracks: 1

Construction
- Structure type: At grade

Other information
- Status: Unstaffed
- Website: Official website

History
- Opened: May 15, 1963

Services
Preceding station	JR East	Following station
Ezuriko towards Yokote	Kitakami Line Rapid; Local	Kitakami Terminus
Location
- Location within Iwate Prefecture Location within Japan

Yanagihara Station (柳原駅, Yanagihara-eki) is a railway station located in the city of Kitakami, Iwate Prefecture, Japan, operated by the East Japan Railway Company (JR East).

== Lines ==
Yanagihara Station is served by the Kitakami Line, and is located 2.1 rail kilometers from the terminus of the line at Kitakami Station.

== Station layout ==
Yanagihara Station has one side platforms serving a single bi-directional track. The station is unattended.

== History ==
The station opened on May 15, 1963. The station was absorbed into the JR East network upon the privatization of the Japan National Railways (JNR) on April 1, 1987.

== Surrounding area ==
- National Route 4
- National Route 107

== See also ==
- List of railway stations in Japan
