= Yanagihara Station =

Yanagihara Station is the name of multiple train stations in Japan.

- Yanagihara Station (Ehime) (柳原駅) in Ehime Prefecture
- Yanagihara Station (Iwate) (柳原駅) in Iwate Prefecture
- Yanagihara Station (Nagano) (柳原駅) in Nagano Prefecture
