= Kitakami Line =

Railway line in Tohoku, Japan

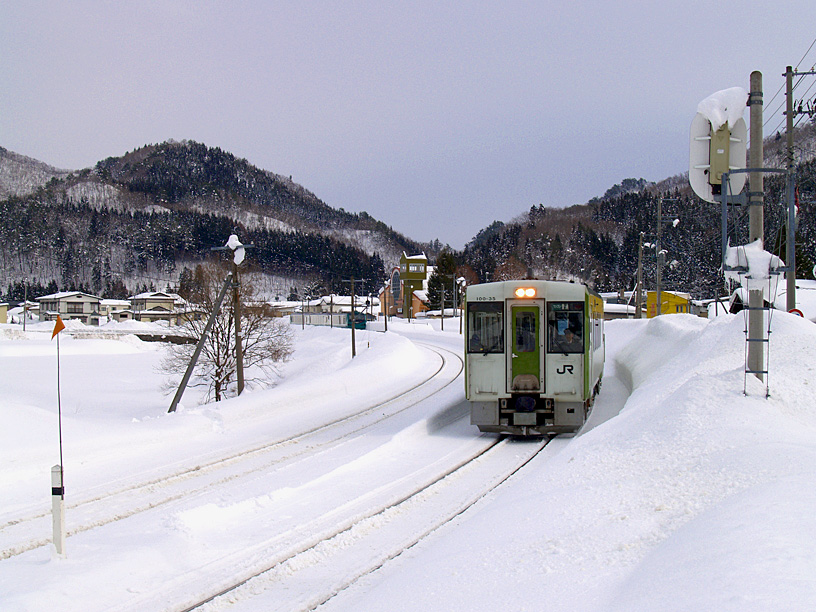
- KiHa 100 series DMU at Ainono

Overview
- Native name: 北上線
- Status: In operation
- Owner: JR East
- Locale: Iwate, Akita prefectures
- Termini: Kitakami; Yokote
- Stations: 15

Service
- Type: Heavy rail
- Operator: JR East
- Rolling stock: KiHa 100 series DMU

History
- Opened: 1924; 102 years ago

Technical
- Line length: 61.6 km (38.3 mi)
- Num of tracks: Entire line single tracked
- Character: Rural
- Track gauge: 1,067 mm (3 ft 6 in)
- Electrification: None
- Operating speed: 85 km/h (53 mph)
Route map

The Kitakami Line (北上線, Kitakami-sen) is a railway line in Japan. Part of the East Japan Railway Company (JR East) system, it connects Kitakami Station in Kitakami, Iwate Prefecture to Yokote Station in Yokote, Akita Prefecture, acting as a connecting line between the Ōu Main Line to the Tōhoku Main Line. It connects with the Tōhoku Shinkansen and Tohoku Main Line at Kitakami Station, and the Ōu Main Line at Yokote Station.

== History ==
The line opened in sections from both Kitakami and Yokote between 1920 and 1924.

In 1962 a 15 km (9.3 mi) deviation was built in conjunction with the construction of the Yuda Dam, which added 0.8 km (0.50 mi) to the length of the line.

CTC signalling was commissioned in 1994, and freight services ceased in 2010.

== Station list ==
● - All trains stop ｜ - All trains pass

Station	Japanese	Distance (km) (from Kitakami)	Local	Rapid	Transfers	Location	
Kitakami	北上	0.0	●	●	Tōhoku Shinkansen, ■ Tōhoku Main Line	Kitakami	Iwate Prefecture
Yanagihara	柳原	2.1	●	●		Kitakami	Iwate Prefecture
Ezuriko	江釣子	5.2	●	●		Kitakami	Iwate Prefecture
Fujine	藤根	8.4	●	●		Kitakami	Iwate Prefecture
Tatekawame	立川目	12.1	●	●		Kitakami	Iwate Prefecture
Yokokawame	横川目	14.3	●	●		Kitakami	Iwate Prefecture
Iwasawa	岩沢	18.1	●	●		Kitakami	Iwate Prefecture
Waka-Sennin	和賀仙人	20.3	●	●		Kitakami	Iwate Prefecture
Yudakinshūko	ゆだ錦秋湖	28.8	●	●		Nishiwaga	Iwate Prefecture
Hotto-Yuda	ほっとゆだ	35.2	●	●		Nishiwaga	Iwate Prefecture
Yudakōgen	ゆだ高原	39.1	●	●		Nishiwaga	Iwate Prefecture
Kurosawa	黒沢	44.3	●	●		Yokote	Akita Prefecture
Komatsukawa	小松川	49.6	●	|		Yokote	Akita Prefecture
Ainono	相野々	53.4	●	●		Yokote	Akita Prefecture
Yokote	横手	61.1	●	●	■ Ōu Main Line	Yokote	Akita Prefecture

== Rolling stock ==
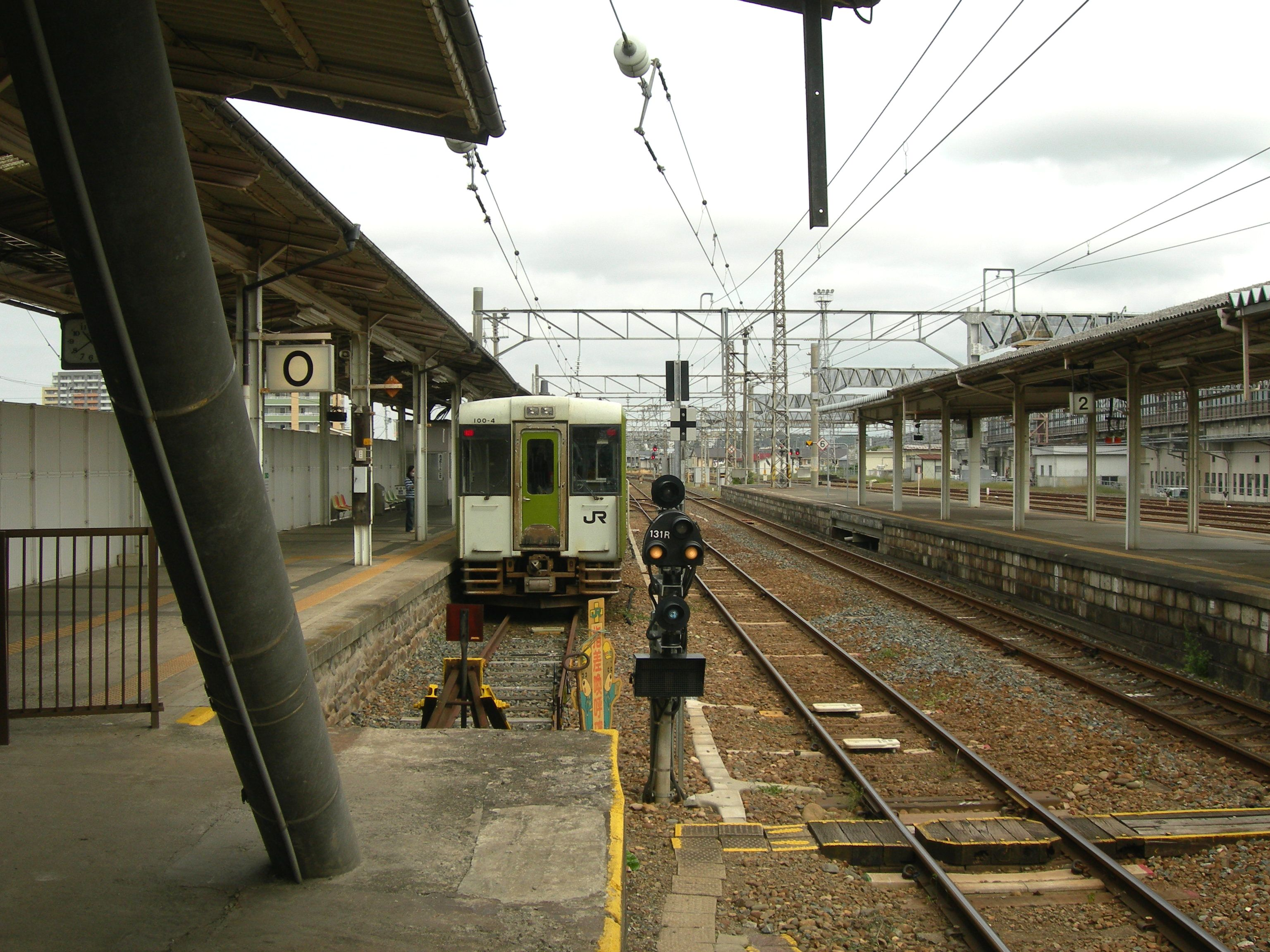
Terminus of the Kitakami Line at Kitakami Station

- KiHa 100 series DMUs
