= Yokote Station =

Railway station in Yokote, Akita Prefecture, Japan

Yokote Station 横手駅
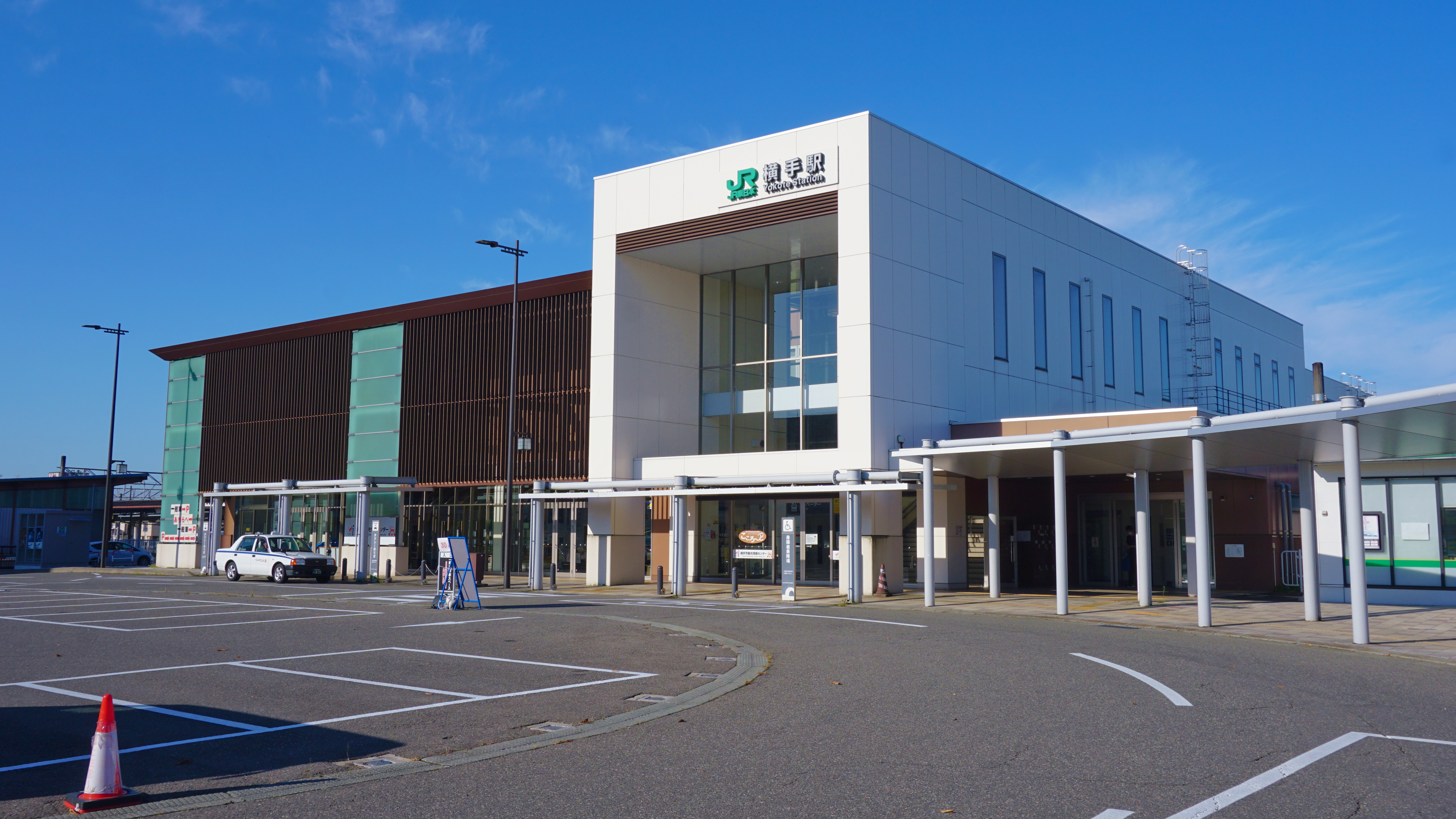
- East station building (September 2022)

General information
- Location: 5-1 Ekimae-chō, Yokote-shi, Akita-ken 013-0036; Japan
- Coordinates: 39°18′36.8″N 140°33′38″E
- Operator: JR East
- Lines: ■ Ōu Main Line; ■Kitakami Line
- Distance: 228.3 kilometers from Fukushima
- Platforms: 1 island + 2 side platforms
- Connections: Bus stop

Other information
- Website: Official website

History
- Opened: June 15, 1905

Passengers
- FY2018: 1247 daily

Services
Preceding station	JR East	Following station
Jūmonji One-way operation	Ōu Main Line Rapid	Ōmagari towards Aomori
Yanagita towards Shinjō	Ōu Main Line Local	Gosannen towards Aomori
Terminus	Kitakami Line Rapid; Local	Ainono towards Kitakami
Former services
Preceding station	JR East	Following station
Terminus	Kitakami Line Local (Mar - Dec)	Yabitsu towards Kitakami
Location

Yokote Station (横手駅, Yokote-eki) is an interchange railway station on the Ōu Main Line in the city of Yokote, Akita Prefecture, Japan, operated by JR East.

== Lines ==
Yokote Station is served by the Ōu Main Line, and is located 228.3 km from the terminus of the line at Fukushima Station. It is also the terminal station of the Kitakami Line and is located 61.1 km from the opposing terminus of the line at Kitakami Station.

== Station layout ==
The station consists of a one island platform and two opposed side platforms serving four tracks, although Platform 4 is not normally in use. The platforms are connected by a footbridge. The station has two station buildings on the west and east sides. There is a Midori no Madoguchi staffed ticket office.

=== Platforms ===
1	■ Kitakami Line	for Kitakami
2	■ Ōu Main Line	for Yuzawa and Shinjō
3	■ Ōu Main Line	for Ōmagari and Akita
4	■ Ou Main Line, Kitakami line	Not normally used

== History ==
Yokote Station opened on June 15, 1905 as a station on the Japanese Government Railways (JGR), serving the town of Yokote, Akita. The Yokosho Railway began operations to the station on August 18, 1918 and the predecessor to the Kitakami line began operations from October 10, 1920. A new station building was completed in November 1924, but was destroyed in American air raids on July 15 and August 5, 1945. The JGR became the Japanese National Railways (JNR) after World War II. The Yokosho Line ceased operations on April 20, 1971. A new station building was completed in April 1978. All freight operations were discontinued from November 1986. The station was absorbed into the JR East network upon the privatization of the JNR on April 1, 1987. A new station building was opened in October 2011.

== Passenger statistics ==
In fiscal 2018, the station was used by an average of 1247 passengers daily (boarding passengers only).

== Surrounding area ==
=== East side ===
- Yokote City Office

=== West side ===
- National Route 13 (Yokote Bypass)
- Hiraka General Hospital

== See also ==
- List of railway stations in Japan
