= Kitakami Station =

Railway station in Kitakami, Iwate Prefecture, Japan

Kitakami Station 北上駅
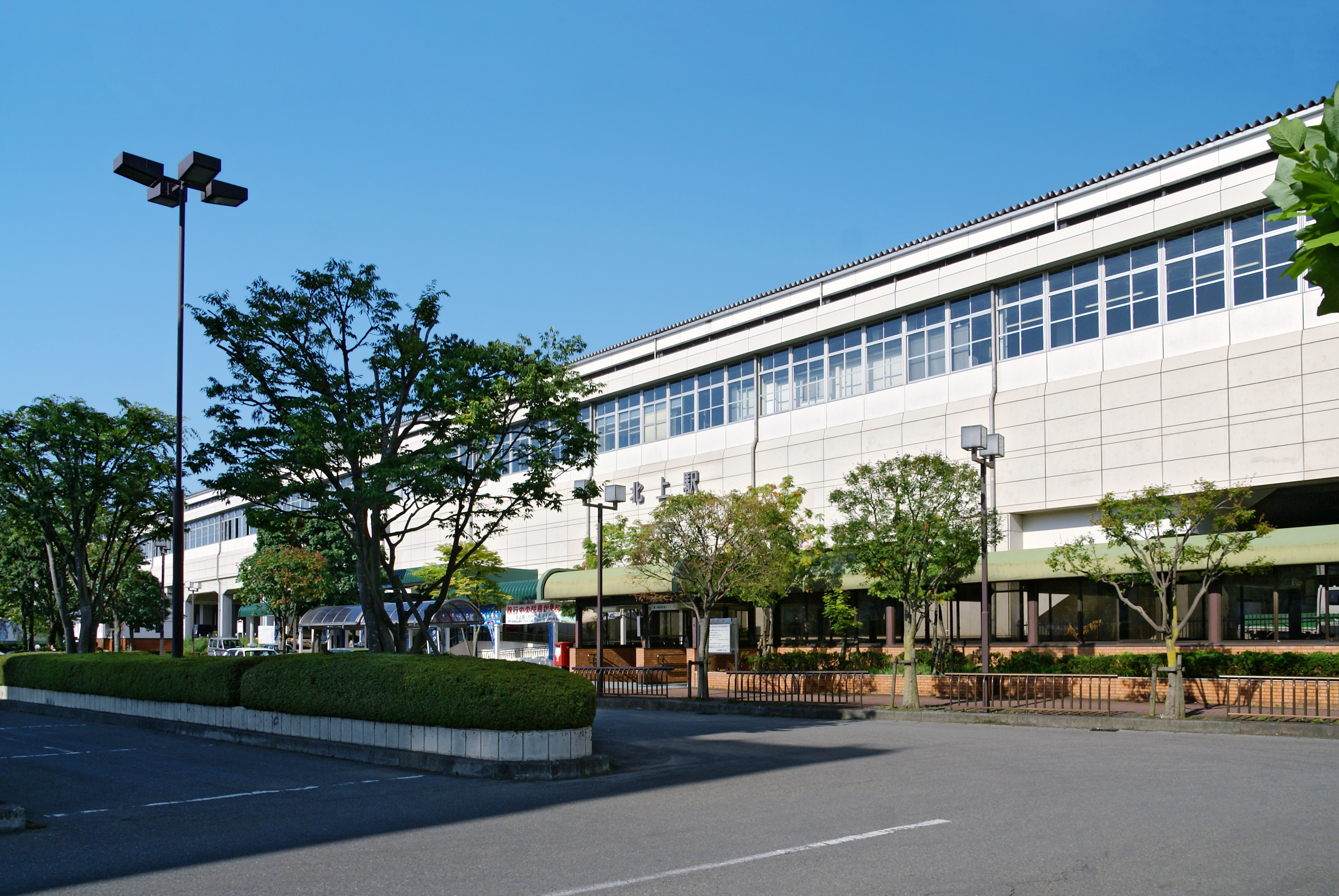
- East side of Kitakami Station in August 2007

General information
- Location: 1-1-2 Odori, Kitakami City, Iwate-ken 024-0061; Japan
- Coordinates: 39.282198°N 141.122346°E
- Operator: JR East; JR Freight
- Lines: Tōhoku Shinkansen; Tōhoku Main Line; Kitakami Line
- Distance: 487.5 km (302.9 mi) from Tokyo
- Platforms: 2 island + 2 side platforms
- Tracks: 5
- Connections: Bus

Other information
- Status: Staffed (Midori no Madoguchi)
- Website: Official website

History
- Opened: 1 November 1890; 135 years ago
- Former names: Kurozawajiri Station (until 1954)

Passengers
- FY2018: 3,778 daily

Services
Preceding station	JR East	Following station
Mizusawa-Esashi towards Tokyo	Tōhoku Shinkansen Hayabusa	Shin-Hanamaki towards Shin-Aomori
Mizusawa-Esashi towards Tokyo	Tōhoku Shinkansen Yamabiko	Shin-Hanamaki towards Morioka
Rokuhara One-way operation	Tōhoku Main Line Rapid Aterui	Hanamaki towards Morioka
Rokuhara towards Kuroiso	Tōhoku Main Line Local	Murasakino towards Morioka
Terminus	Kitakami Line Rapid; Local	Yanagihara towards Yokote
Location
- Location within Iwate Prefecture Location within Japan

Kitakami Station (北上駅, Kitakami-eki) is a junction railway station in the city of Kitakami, Iwate, Japan, operated by the East Japan Railway Company (JR East), with a freight terminal operated by the Japan Freight Railway Company (JR Freight).

== Lines ==
Kitakami Station is served by the Tōhoku Shinkansen high-speed line from Tokyo to Shin-Aomori, and also by local services on the Tōhoku Main Line and Kitakami Line. It is located 487.5 kilometers from the starting point of the Tōhoku Main Line at Tokyo Station and is also a terminus for the Kitakami Line.

== Station layout ==
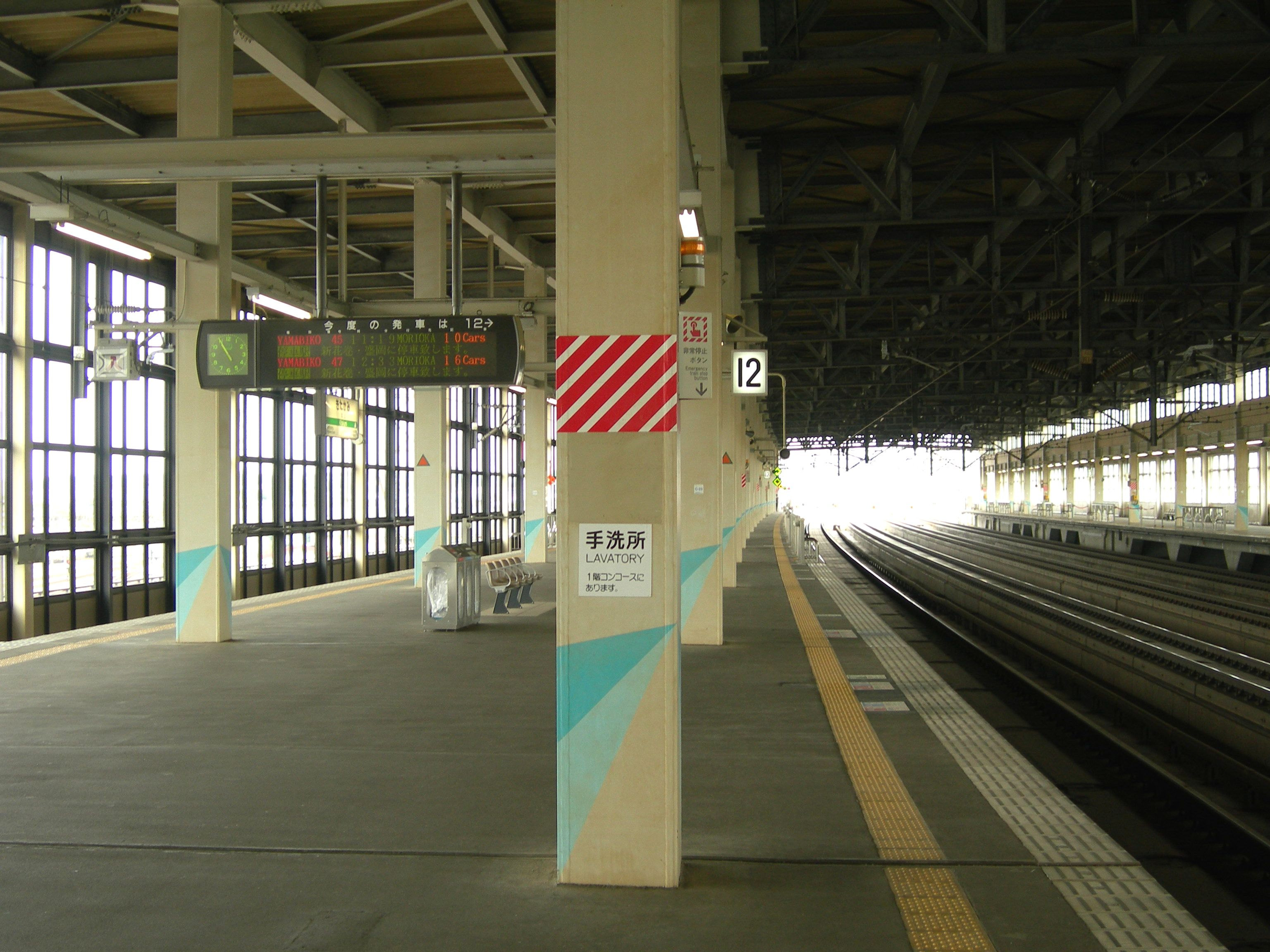
The shinkansen platforms in September 2009

The local portion of Kitakami Station has an island platform and a single side platform. However, the side platform is cut, forming a partial bay platform, so that the platform effectively serves two tracks. The Tōhoku Shinkansen portion of the station has an island platform and a single side platform serving three tracks. All of the platforms are elevated. The station has a Midori no Madoguchi staffed ticket office.

=== Platforms ===
0	■ Kitakami Line	for Hottoyuda and Yokote
0	■ Tohoku Main Line	for Hanamaki, Yahaba, and Morioka (starting trains only)
1	■ Kitakami Line	for Hotto-Yuda and Yokoke
1	■ Tohoku Main Line	for Morioka, Yahaba, and Morioka (starting trains only) for Mizusawa, Hiraizumi, and Ichinoseki (starting trains only)
2	■ Tohoku Main Line	for Hanamaki, Yahaba, and Morioka
3	■ Tohoku Main Line	for Mizusawa, Hiraizumi, and Ichinoseki
11	■ Tohoku Shinkansen	spare platform
12	■ Tohoku Shinkansen	for Morioka, Shin-Aomori, and Akita
13	■ Tohoku Shinkansen	for Sendai, and Tokyo

== History ==
The station opened on 1 November 1890 as Kurosawajiri Station (黒沢尻駅). It was renamed Kitakami Station on 10 November 1954. The station was absorbed into the JR East network upon the privatization of the Japanese National Railways (JNR) on 1 April 1987. Services on the Tohoku Shinkansen commenced 30 March 1996.

== Passenger statistics ==
In fiscal 2018, the station was used by an average of 3,778 passengers daily (boarding passengers only).

== Surrounding area ==
- Kitakami City Hall
- Hotel Mets Kitakami
- Kitakami Post office
- Hotel CityPlaza Kitakami

== See also ==
- List of railway stations in Japan
