= Japan National Route 107 =

National highway in Japan

National Route 107
- 国道107号
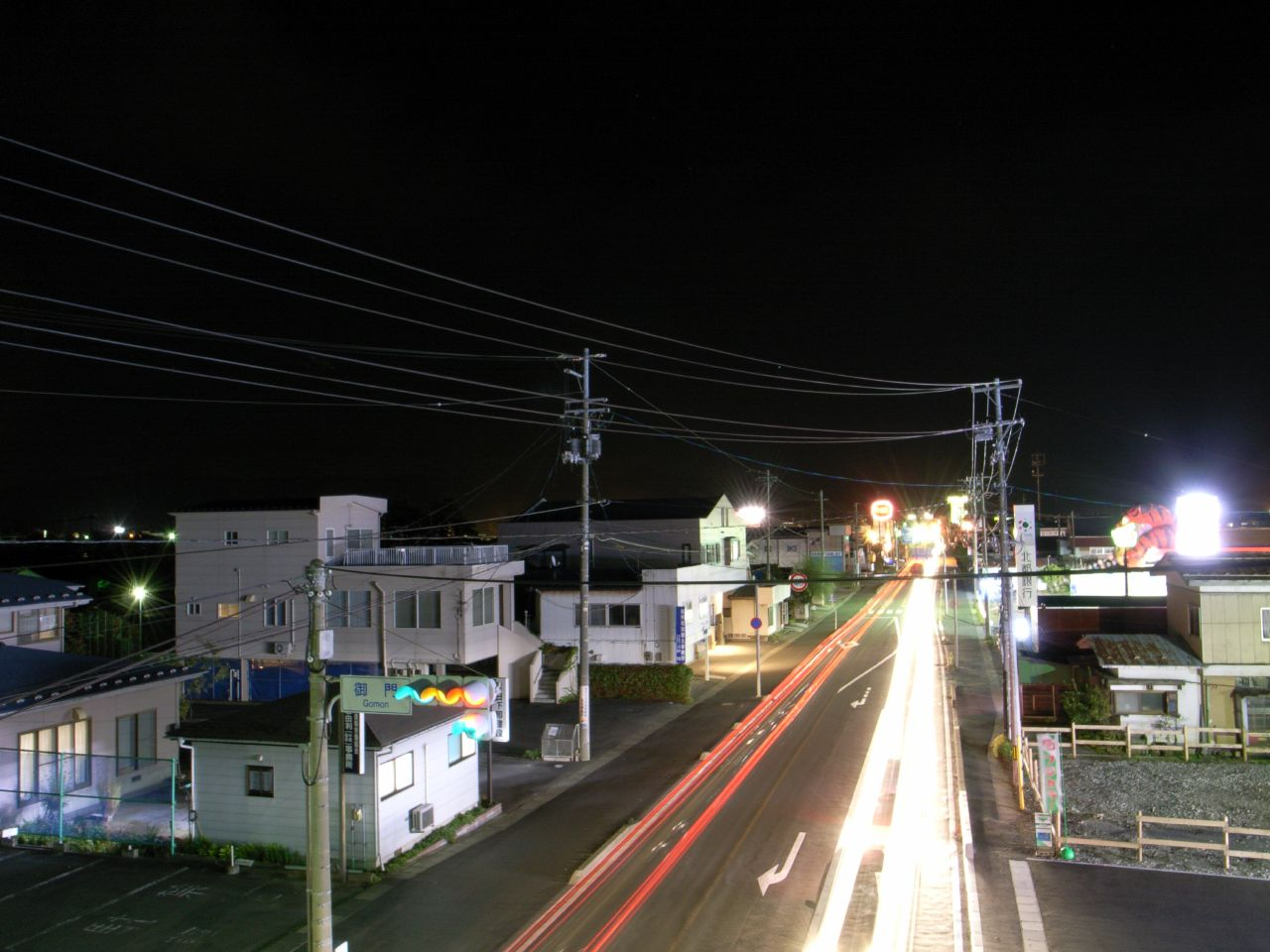
- Route 107 in Yurihonjō

Route information
- Length: 193.0 km (119.9 mi)
- Existed: 18 May 1953–present

Major junctions
- East end: National Route 45/Prefectural Road 230 in Ōfunato
- West end: National Route 7 in Yurihonjō

Location
- Country: Japan

Highway system
- National highways of Japan; Expressways of Japan
← National Route 106	→ National Route 108

Japan National Route 107 (国道107号, Kokudō hyaku-nanagō) is a highway in Akita Prefecture and Iwate Prefecture, Japan, from Yurihonjō City (由利本荘市, Yurihonjō-shi) in Akita to Ōfunato City (大船渡市, ōfunato shi) in Iwate. Its total length is 193.0 kilometers (119.9 mi).
